= De Angelis =

De Angelis or de Angelis is a surname of Italian origin. Notable people with the surname include:

- Alberto de Angelis (1885–1965), Italian writer, musicologist and biographer
- Aldo DeAngelis (1931–2004), American politician
- Alex de Angelis (born 1984), Sammarinese Grand Prix motorcycle road racer
- Antonio T De Angelis III (born 1980), U.S. Marine, D.J., actor, preacher
- April De Angelis (contemporary), British dramatist and playwright
- Billy DeAngelis (born 1946), American basketball player
- Camille DeAngelis, American novelist and travel writer
- Carmela DeAngelis, fictional character in the American series The Sopranos
- Catherine D. DeAngelis, American MD, editor of the Journal of the American Medical Association
- Corey DeAngelis, American right-wing political activist
- Eleonora De Angelis (born 1967), Italian voice actress
- Elio de Angelis (1958–1986), Italian Formula One race car driver
- Enrico De Angelis (1920–2018), Italian singer
- Filippo de Angelis (1792–1877), Italian Roman Catholic cardinal
- Francesco de Angelis (sailor) (born 1960), Italian world championship sailboat racer
- Francesco De Angelis (musician) (born 1971), Italian classical violinist
- Frankie DeAngelis (born 1986), Canadian professional ice hockey defenceman
- Gianluca De Angelis (footballer, born 1967) Italian footballer actives in 1985–2005, Serie B, C1 & C2 players
- Gualtiero De Angelis (1899–1980), Italian voice actor
- Guido & Maurizio De Angelis (contemporary), Italian composers and singers
- Jason DeAngelis
- Jerome de Angelis (1567–1623), Italian Jesuit missionary to Japan; executed by fire
- Kristen DeAngelis, American microbiologist and environmental activist
- Manlio De Angelis (1935–2017), Italian voice actor
- Maximilian de Angelis (1889–1974), German general officer during World War II; POW 1945–55
- Mike DeAngelis, Canadian musician
- Mike DeAngelis (born 1966), Canadian ice hockey player and coach
- Milo de Angelis (born 1951), Italian poet
- Nazzareno De Angelis (1881–1962), Italian operatic bass singer
- Nicolas De Angelis (born 1997), French-Italian astrophysicist
- Perry DeAngelis (1963–2007), American co-founder and executive director of NESS, co-founder of The Skeptics' Guide to the Universe
- Raffaele De Angelis (born 1979), Italian Greek-Catholic bishop
- Remo De Angelis (1926–2014), Italian film actor, stunt man and painter
- Roberto De Angelis (born 1959), Italian comic book artist
- Roman De Angelis (born 2001), Canadian racing driver
- Rosemary De Angelis (1933–2020), American stage, film, and television actress
- Sandro DeAngelis (born 1981), Canadian gridiron football placekicker
- Tino De Angelis (1915–2009), American confidence man and commodities trader
- Valentina de Angelis (born 1989), American actress
- Victoria De Angelis (born 2000), Italian bassist
- Vittorio De Angelis (1962–2015), Italian voice actor
- William De Angelis (born 1981), Sammarinese motorcycle racer
- Wilma De Angelis (1930–2026), Italian singer and TV presenter

== See also ==
- Angelis (disambiguation)
- DeAngelo (disambiguation)
