= Eparchy of Piana degli Albanesi =

Eparchy of the Italo-Albanian Catholic Church

Coordinates: 37.9962°N 13.2853°E

Eparchy of Piana degli Albanesi Planensis Albanensium Eparchia di Piana degli Albanesi Eparhia e Horës së Arbëreshëvet
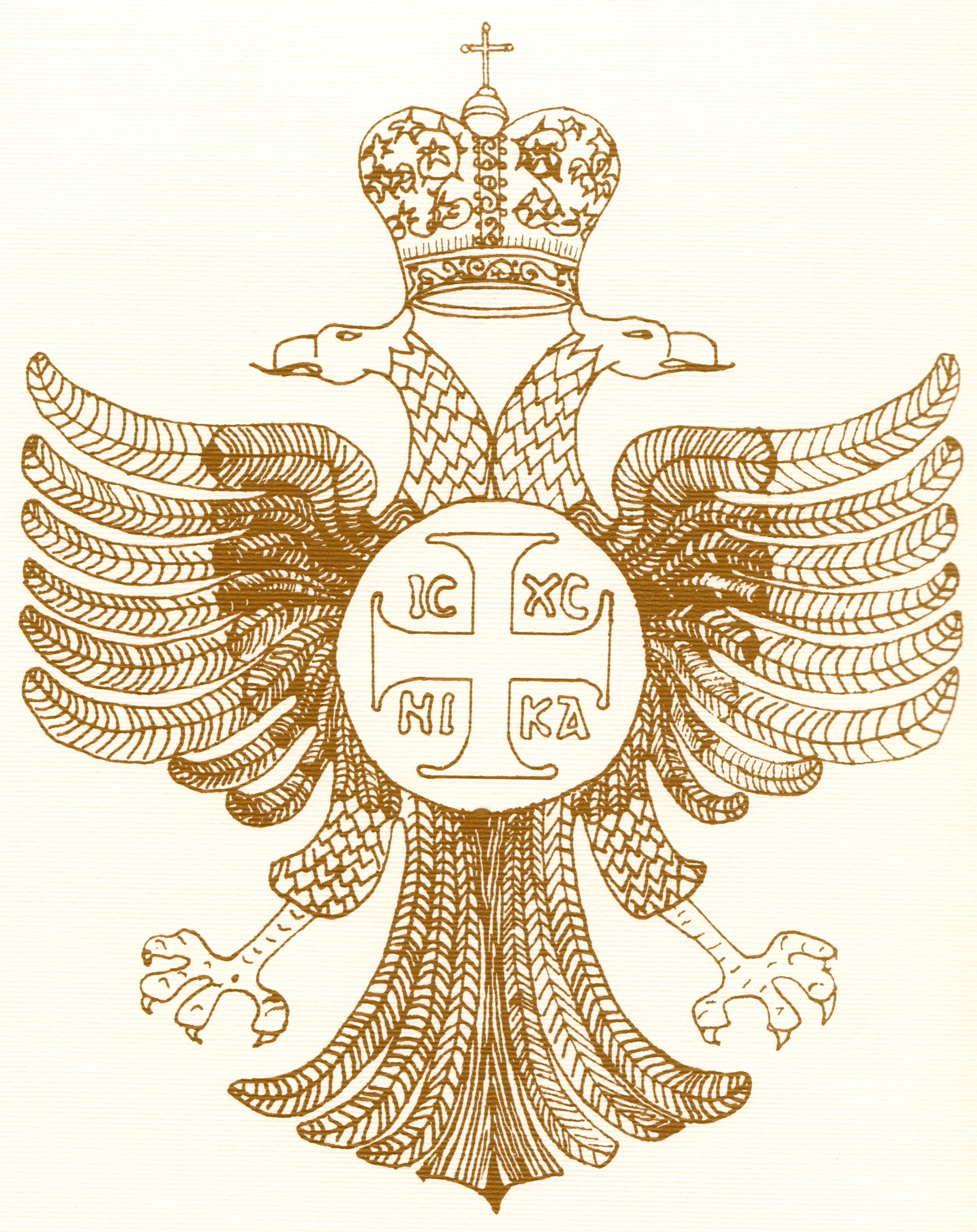
- Coat of arms

Location
- Country: Italy
- Ecclesiastical province: Immediately Subject to the Holy See

Statistics
- Population: Total; Catholics: (as of 2023); 24,500 (est.) ▼; 23,400 (est.) ▼
- Parishes: 16 ▲

Information
- Denomination: Italo-Albanian Catholic Church
- Rite: Byzantine Rite
- Established: 26 October 1937
- Cathedral: Cathedral of St Demetrius the Martyr (Piana degli Albanesi)
- Co-cathedral: St. Mary of the Admiral (Palermo)
- Patron saint: Demetrius
- Secular priests: 21 (diocesan) ▼2 (Religious Orders)

Current leadership
- Pope: Leo XIV
- Bishop: Raffaele De Angelis

Map
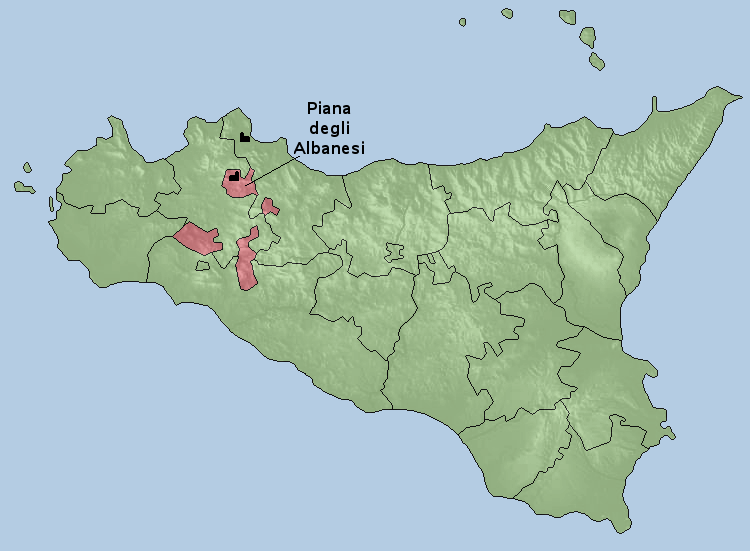

Website
- eparchiapiana.org

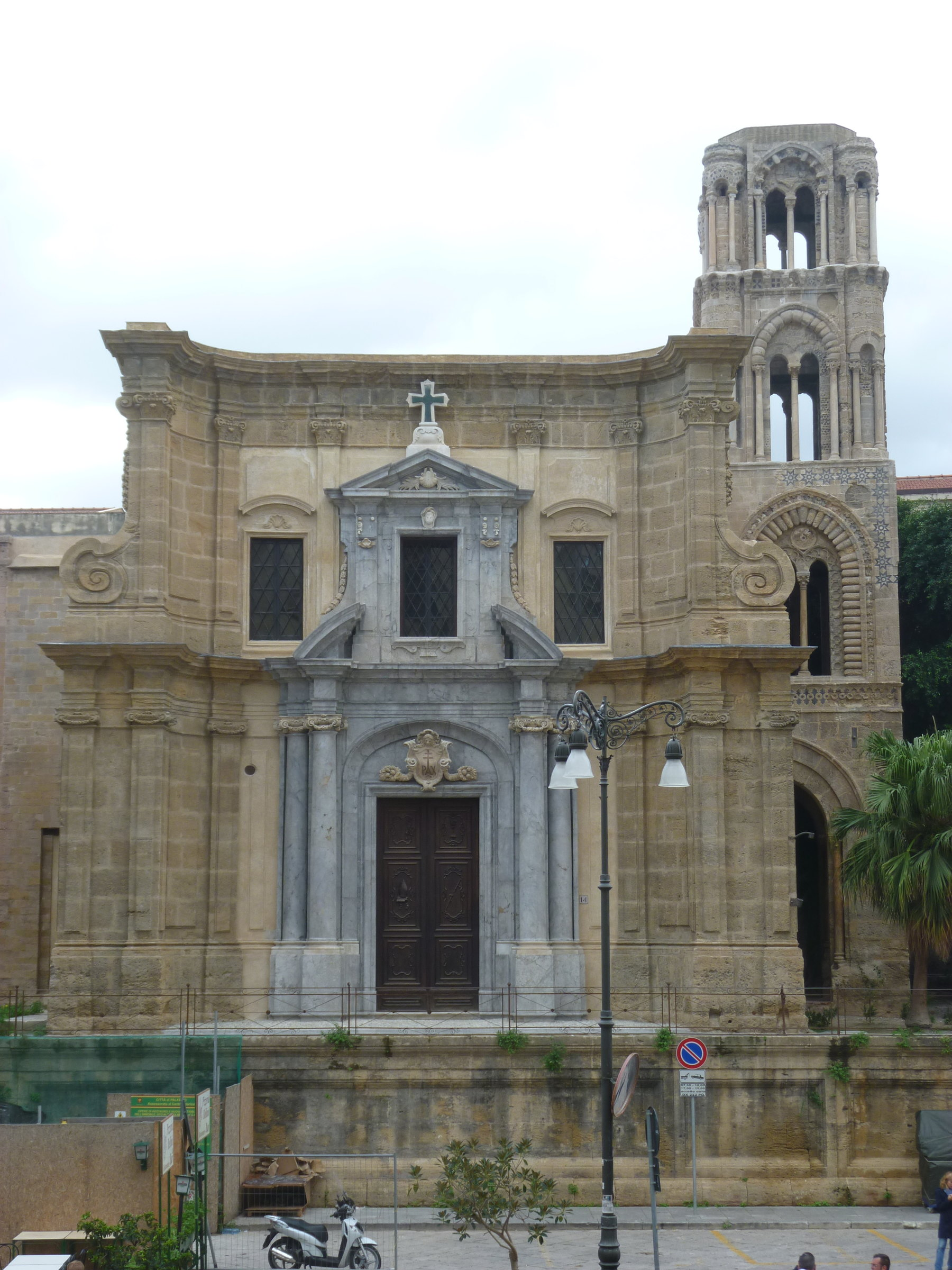
The Co-Cathedral of Saint Nicolas "dei Greci" to Martorana in Palermo.

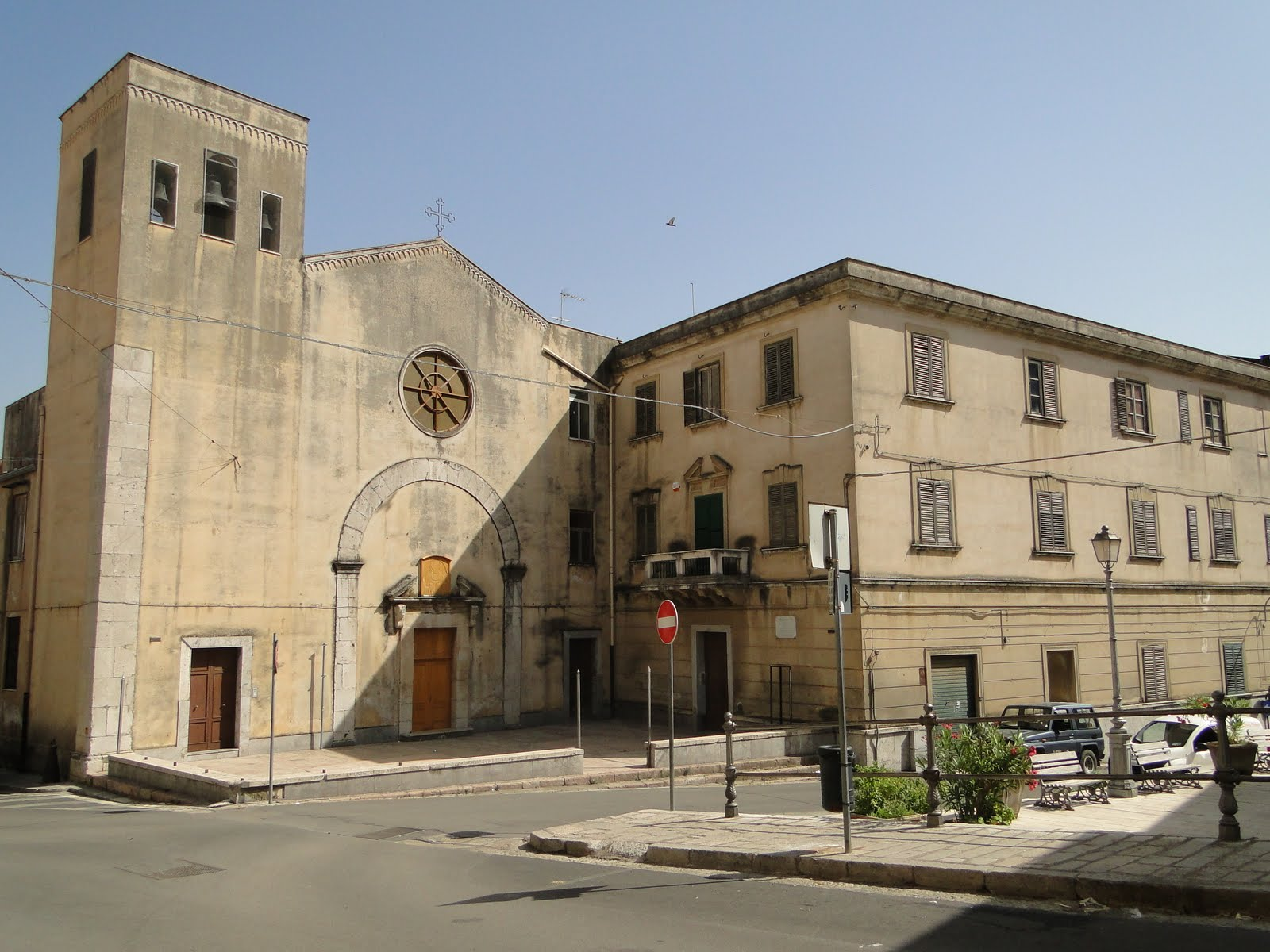
Episcope and annexed Eparchial Seminary, heir to the destroyed Arbëreshë Seminary of Palermo (1734).

The Eparchy of Piana degli Albanesi (Arbëreshë Albanian: Eparhia e Horës së Arbëreshëvet; Italian: Eparchia di Piana degli Albanesi) is an eparchy (diocese) of the Italo-Albanian Catholic Church, an Eastern Catholic church sui iuris of Byzantine Rite, covering the island of Sicily in Italy.

== History ==
There was already a church established by Albanian refugees in Sicily at Palermo by 1547. The seminary for the education of Greek-rite clergy was founded, principally through the work of the Oratorian priest, George Guzzetta, a native of Piana, opened in 1734. The rector of the seminary became the ordaining bishop for the Greek-rite in Sicily.

On 6 February 1784, was established the Ordinariate of Silicia, the first jurisdiction with on ordinary for this particular church sui iuris, and appointed to it the first titular bishop of the Byzantine Rite for the Albanians of Sicily: Giorgio Stassi, Titular Bishop of Lampsacus. Before, the Albanians faithful and their Orthodox priests they had no right and were at risk in assimilation in the Roman rite.

On 26 October 1937, the Eparchy of Piana dei Greci was created, by promoting the Ordinariate of Silicia and transferring to it territories from the Metropolitan Archdiocese of Palermo and Metropolitan Archdiocese of Monreale (both on Sicily). The new eparchy was to be directly subject to the Holy See, and under the supervision of the Sacred Congregation for the Eastern Churches.

On 25 October 1941, the Eparchy (Diocese) of Piana dei Greci was renamed the Eparchy of Piana degli Albanesi (Eparkia or Eparhia e Horës së Arbëreshëvet).

== Territory ==
The Eparchy of Piana degli Albanesi includes the comunes in province of Palermo: Contessa Entellina, Mezzojuso, Palazzo Adriano, Piana degli Albanesi and Santa Cristina Gela.

The seat of the eparchy is in the town of Piana degli Albanesi. The principal church of the town was designated by Pope Pius XI to be the Cathedral of Saint Demetrius the Martyr. In the same document, the pope designated the Church of S. Maria della Martorana (Santa Maria dell’Ammiraglio) in Palermo as a co-cathedral of the eparchy of Piana.

The territory is divided into 15 parishes. Several Latin-rite parishes within the territorial boundaries of Piana presented a difficulty; when a pastoral vacancy occurred, the archbishop of Monreale was to nominate three qualified candidates, from whom the bishop of Piana Graecorum was to choose one.

The Seminary for Italo-Epirotes in Palermo was re-designated the Seminary of the Eparchy of Piana Graecorum, though dioceses which sent students there should continue to do so.

== Ordinaries of Italia continentale of the Italo-Albanese Catholic Church ==
- Giorgio Stassi (25 June 1784 – 26 March 1802)
- Giuseppe Guzzetta (March 29 1802 – 1813)
- Francesco Chiarchiaro (23 September 1813 – 1834)
- Giuseppe Crispi (20 December 1835 – 1859)
- Agostino Franco (1860 – 1877)
- Giuseppe Masi (29 January 1878 – 11 April 1903)
- Paolo Schirò (5 February 1904 – 12 September 1941)

Bishops of the Italo-Albanian Catholic Church, selected from Albanians native to Sicily:
- Agostino Franco (1858–1859) from Mezzojuso
- Giuseppe Schirò (30 July 1889 – 29 November 1896) from Contessa Entellina
- Giovanni Barcia (24 April 1902 – 1912) from Palazzo Adriano

== Bishops of Piana degli Albanesi ==
○ Cardinal Luigi Lavitrano, Archbishop of Palermo, Apostolic Administrator (26 October 1937 – 20 December 1946)

Giuseppe Perniciaro (26 October 1937 – 12 July 1967) Auxiliary Bishop and Vicar General, Titular Bishop of Arbanum

○ Cardinal Ernesto Ruffini, Archbishop of Palermo, Apostolic Administrator (3 January 1947 – 11 June 1967)

- Giuseppe Perniciaro (12 July 1967 – 31 May 1981 resigned)
- Ercole Lupinacci † (25 March 1981 – 30 November 1987 appointed Italo-Albanese Eparchy of Lungro)
- Sotir Ferrara † (15 October 1988 – 8 April 2013 retired)
  - Cardinal Paolo Romeo, Apostolic Administrator (8 April 2013 – 31 March 2015)
- Giorgio Demetrio Gallaro (31 March 2015 – 25 February 2020)
  - Giorgio Demetrio Gallaro (25 February 2020 – 19 June 2023), Titular Archbishop of Trecale, Apostolic Administrator
  - Cardinal Francesco Montenegro (19 June 2023 – 30 August 2025), Archbishop emeritus of Agrigento, Apostolic Administrator
- Raffaele De Angelis (since 30 August 2025)

== See also ==
- Arbëreshë Seminary of Palermo (Italo-Albanian Seminary)
- List of people declared venerable by Pope Francis#November 25, 2021 Giorgio Guzzetta, CO.
- Italo-Albanese Eparchy of Lungro
- Arbëreshë people

== Sources ==
- Elli, Alberto (2017). Breve storia delle chiese orientali. (in Italian). 2nd ed. Milano: Edizione Terra Santa, 2017.
- Fortescue, Adrian (1923). The Uniate Eastern Churches. The Byzantine rite in Italy, Sicily, Syria and Egypt. London: B. Oates & Washburne 1923. pp. 164-168.
