= Raffaele De Angelis =

Italian Catholic prelate and bishop (born 1979)

Most Reverend Raffaele De Angelis
- Bishop of Piana degli Albanesi
- Church: Italo-Albanian Catholic
- See: Eparchy of Piana degli Albanesi
- Appointed: 30 August 2025
- Installed: 16 November 2025
- Predecessor: Giorgio Demetrio Gallaro

Personal details
- Born: 5 March 1979 (age 47) Castrovillari, Italy
- Residence: Piana degli Albanesi, Palermo, Sicily, Italy
- Occupation: Prelate

Ordination history
History
Priestly ordination
- Ordained by: Ercole Lupinacci
Episcopal consecration
- Principal consecrator: Donato Oliverio
- Co-consecrators: Francesco Montenegro, Manuel Nin

Raffaele De Angelis (born 24 October 1979) is an Italo-Albanian prelate of the Greek-Catholic Church and the Bishop of the Eparchy of Piana degli Albanesi, a circumscription of the Italo-Albanian Catholic Church in Sicily, Italy.

== Biography ==
Raffaele De Angelis was born on 24 October 1979 in Castrovillari, in the province of Cosenza (Calabria), to an Italo-Albanian family from Acquaformosa and Firmo (CS), belonging to the Eparchy of Lungro.

Admitted to the Pontifical Greek College of Saint Athanasius in Rome, he completed his philosophical and theological studies at the Pontifical Gregorian University. He received priestly ordination, according to his own Byzantine rite, on 5 November 2006, at the Church of San Giovanni Battista in Acquaformosa (Eparchy of Lungro), by the laying on of hands of Eparch Ercole Lupinacci; he was incardinated as a priest of the same eparchy. He held the chair of Moral Theology at the "San Francesco di Sales" Higher Institute of Religious Sciences of the Metropolitan Archdiocese of Cosenza, in Rende, attached to the Pontifical Theological Faculty of Southern Italy.

He speaks fluent Albanian and Italian, while liturgically he also uses Koine Greek, as per the tradition of the Italo-Albanian Catholic Church.

== Episcopal ministry ==
On 30 August 2025, Pope Leo XIV appointed him Eparch of Piana degli Albanesi; he succeeded Giorgio Demetrio Gallaro, previously appointed Secretary of the Congregation for the Oriental Churches. He received episcopal ordination on 8 November, in the Cathedral of Lungro, from Donato Oliverio, Eparch of Lungro, with Cardinal Francesco Montenegro, Archbishop Emeritus of Agrigento and Apostolic Administrator of Piana degli Albanesi, and Bishop Manuel Nin, Apostolic Exarch of Greece, as co-consecrators.

On 16 November 2025, in the Piana degli Albanesi Cathedral, he took canonical possession of the Eparchy of Piana degli Albanesi, in the presence of His Eminence Cardinal Francesco Montenegro, Eparch Donato Oliverio, and Msgr. Archbishop Corrado Lorefice of Palermo, Bishop Asti Bakallbashi, Metropolitan of Berat, Vlora, and Canina of the Autocephalous Albanian Orthodox Church, and, exceptionally, His Excellency Archbishop Polycarp of the newly established Orthodox Metropolitanate of Italy and Malta, representatives of the sister Territorial Abbacy of Saint Mary of Grottaferrata, a large delegation of the bishops of Sicily, Engineer Rosario Petta, Mayor of Piana degli Albanesi, Mayor Annalisa Milione of Acquaformosa, and a large assembly of faithful from the Italo-Albanian districts. On 23 November, the first Sunday after, he will solemnly celebrate the Divine Liturgy at the Co-Cathedral of San Nicolò dei Greci alla Martorana of the Eparchy of Piana degli Albanesi.

Catholic Church titles
Preceded by Giorgio Demetrio Gallaro	Bishop of Piana degli Albanesi from 30 August 2025	Incumbent
