= Angelis (disambiguation) =

Angelis is a British classical singing group of young choristers.

Angelis may also refer to:

== People ==
- Angelis Angeli (born 1989), Cypriot professional footballer
- Angelis Borges, contestant on the Brazilian reality television show Fazenda de Verão
- Angelis Gatsos (1771–1839), Slavophone Greek military commander
- Angelis Govios (1780–1822), leader of the Greek War of Independence
- Apostolos Angelis (born 1993), cross-country skier from Greece
- Michael Angelis (1944–2020), British actor
- Odysseas Angelis (1912–1987), Greek military officer
- Paul Angelis (1943–2009), British actor
- Peter Angelis (1685–1734), French painter
- Talbot Angelis, fictional character of the American television drama series True Blood
- Tom Angelis, Maryland political candidate
- Vasilis Angelis (born 1980), Greek composer, engineer, and producer

== Other uses ==
- Angelis (album), the debut album from Angelis
- Angeli Foods, a US grocery store

== See also ==
- Angeli (disambiguation)
- Angelus
- Vangelis (born 1943), Greek musician
- Angela (given name)
- De Angelis
