= Francesco De Angelis =

Francesco De Angelis may refer to:

- Francesco De Angelis (musician) (born 1971), Italian violinist
- Francesco de Angelis (sailor) (born 1960), Italian yachtsman
- Francesco De Angelis (politician)
