= Vasilis Angelis =

Greek composer, engineer, and producer

- Born: Vasileios Angelis; 1980 (age 45–46)
- Origin: Trikala, Greece
- Genres: Electronic, Ethnic, Orchestral, Worldbeat, Techno, Ambient, Electronica, Progressive
- Occupations: Composer, Arranger, Mastering Engineer, Musician, Producer
- Instruments: Keyboards, Synthesizers, Samplers, Percussion, Digital Audio Workstations
- Years active: 2004-present
- Label: Apoapsis Records
- Website: vasilisangelis.com

Vasileios Angelis (Greek: Βασίλειος Αγγελής) known professionally as Vasilis Angelis (Greek: Βασίλης Αγγελής) is a Greek composer, engineer and producer of Εlectronic, Ethnic and Orchestral music.
Vasilis Angelis is from Trikala Thessaly, Greece and is known for using odd rhythms with electronic and orchestral-traditional instruments.

== Discography ==
=== Studio albums ===
- Amalgama (2010)
- Memoria De Profundis (2013)
- Seven (2016)
- Chronomorph (2022)
