= D'Angelo (disambiguation) =

D'Angelo (1974–2025) was an American musician.

D'Angelo may also refer to:

- D'Angelo Grilled Sandwiches, American sandwich restaurant chain
- D'Angelo (given name)
- D'Angelo (surname)

== See also ==
- DeAngelo (disambiguation)
