= Giorgio Demetrio Gallaro =

Italian prelate of the Catholic Church (born 1948)

Most Reverend Giorgio Demetrio Gallaro
- Secretary of the Congregation for the Oriental Churches
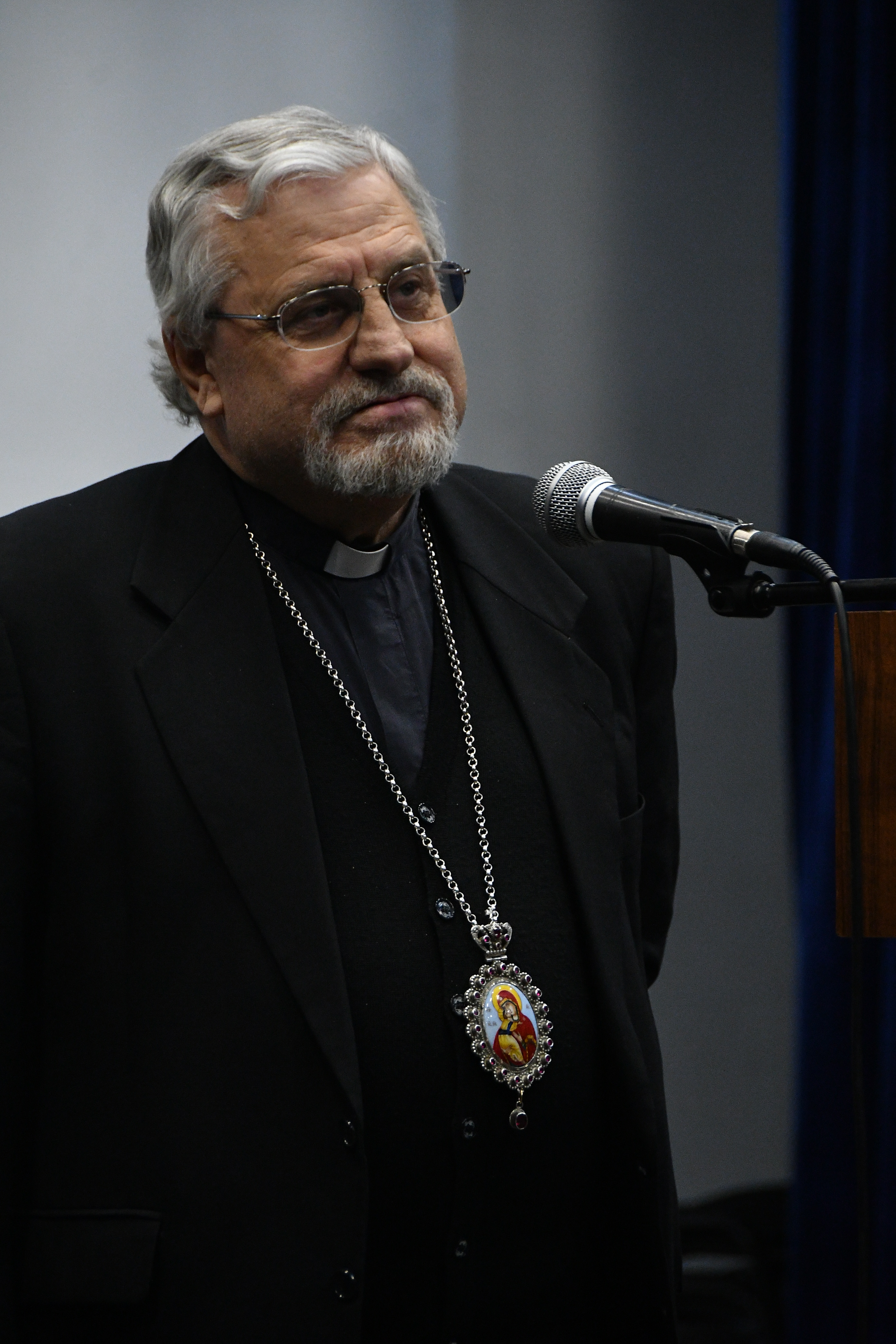
- Appointed: 25 February 2020
- Term ended: 15 February 2023
- Predecessor: Cyril Vasiľ
- Successor: Michel Jalakh
- Previous post: Bishop of Piana degli Albanesi (2015–2020)

Orders
- Ordination: 22 May 1972
- Consecration: 28 June 2015

Personal details
- Born: 16 January 1948 (age 78) Pozzallo, Italy
- Denomination: Italo-Albanian Catholic
- Coat of arms

Giorgio Demetrio Gallaro (born 16 January 1948) is an Italian prelate of the Catholic Church who served as secretary of the Congregation for the Oriental Churches from 25 February 2020 until 15 February 2023. He was the Bishop of the Eparchy of Piana degli Albanesi, a diocese of the Italo-Albanian Catholic Church in Sicily, Italy from 2015 to 2020, where he remained Apostolic Administrator until 19 June 2023.

== Biography ==
Gallaro was born in Pozzallo, Sicily, on 16 January 1948. He began his studies in preparation for the priesthood in the seminary of Noto, he moved to Los Angeles where he studied at St. John's Seminary and was ordained a priest in 1972. He then worked for eight years as a parish priest in two parishes of the Eastern Rite in Los Angeles. He then studied in Rome at the Pontifical Oriental Institute of Rome and at the Pontifical University of Saint Thomas Aquinas, obtaining his doctorate in canonical eastern law and a licenciate in ecumenical theology.

He then carried out parish and teaching activities in the Melkite Greek Catholic Eparchy of Newton, Newton, Massachusetts, including as in-house instructor of canon law to the Melkite seminarians residing at St. Gregory's seminary in Newton Centre, MA. He was also active in the Ukrainian Eparchy of Stamford, Connecticut, and in the Ruthenian Archeparchy of Pittsburgh, Pennsylvania. Beginning in 2011 he was vice-president of the Society of Oriental Law. In 2013 he was named a consultor to the Congregation for the Oriental Churches. He continued to hold several other positions, including sincello for canonical affairs and judicial vicar in the Archeparchy of Pittsburgh, professor of canon law and ecumenical theology at the Byzantine Catholic Seminary of Saints Cyril and Methodius of Pittsburgh, and judge of appeal for the Philadelphia Archeparchy of the Ukrainians.

On 31 March 2015 he was named by Pope Francis to the bishopric of the Eparchy of Piana degli Albanesi. He was consecrated a bishop on 28 June by the bishop of Lungro Donato Oliverio as principal consecrator, and the bishops Dimitrios Salachas and Nicholas James Samra as co-consecrators.

On 25 February 2020, Pope Francis appointed him secretary of the Congregation for the Oriental Churches and gave him the personal title of archbishop. He held that post until Pope Francis appointed Michel Jalakh as secretary.

Catholic Church titles
Preceded by Sotir Ferrara	Bishop of Piana degli Albanesi; 31 March 2015 – 25 February 2020	Vacant
