= Sotir Ferrara =

Most Reverend Sotir Ferrara
- Bishop of Piana degli Albanesi
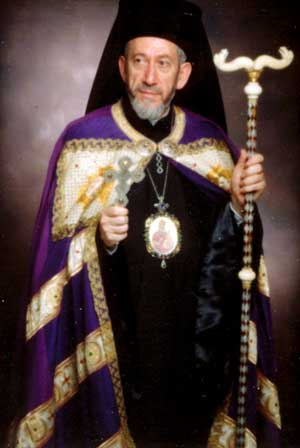
- Church: Italo-Albanian Catholic
- Metropolis: Holy See
- Diocese: Hora e Arbëreshëvet
- See: Piana degli Albanesi
- Appointed: 15 October 1988
- Term ended: 8 April 2013
- Predecessor: Ercole Lupinacci

Orders
- Ordination: 19 November 1960
- Consecration: 15 January 1989 by Miroslav Stefan Marusyn

Personal details
- Born: 5 December 1937 Piana degli Albanesi, Kingdom of Italy
- Died: 25 November 2017 (aged 79)
- Denomination: Italo-Albanian Catholic
- Residence: Piana degli Albanesi, Palermo, Sicily
- Occupation: bishop
- Profession: priest

Sotir Ferrara (5 December 1937 – 25 November 2017) was the Bishop of the Eparchy of Piana degli Albanesi, a diocese of the Italo-Albanian Catholic Church in Sicily, Italy.

== Biography ==
Born in Piana degli Albanesi on 5 December 1937, after studying in preparation for the priesthood on 19 November 1960, he was ordained priest.

On 15 October 1988 he was elected by the Pope John Paul II to the bishopric of Eparchy of Piana degli Albanesi. He received episcopal consecration on 15 January 1989 by Archbishop Miroslav Stefan Marusyn. He retired in April 2013 upon reaching the age limit of 75.

Bishop Ferrara died on 25 November 2017, at the age of 80.

== Apostolic Succession ==
- OSBM Archbishop Andreas Alexander Szeptycki (Sheptytsky), OSBM
- Archbishop Ivan Bucko
- Archbishop Miroslav Stefan Marusyn
- Bishop Sotir Ferrara

Catholic Church titles
Preceded by Ercole Lupinacci	Bishop of Piana degli Albanesi; 15 October 1988 – 8 April 2013	Succeeded by Paolo Romeo (as Apostolic Administrator)
