= DeAngelo =

DeAngelo may refer to:

== Given name ==
- DeAngelo Collins (born 1982), American basketball player
- DeAngelo Hall (born 1983), American football player
- De'Angelo Henderson (born 1992), American football player
- DeAngelo Malone (born 1999), American football player
- DeAngelo Peterson (born 1989), American football player
- DeAngelo Smith (born 1986), American football player
- DeAngelo Tyson (born 1989), American football player
- DeAngelo Williams (born 1983), American football player
- DeAngelo Willingham (born 1987), American football player
- De'Angelo Wilson (1979–2008), American actor and musician
- DeAngelo Yancey (born 1994), American football player

== Surname ==
- Ann Marie DeAngelo, American choreographer
- Joseph James DeAngelo (born 1945), American serial killer
- Rena DeAngelo, American set decorator
- Steve DeAngelo (born 1958), American activist
- Tony DeAngelo (born 1995), American ice hockey player
- Wayne DeAngelo (born 1965), American politician

== Other uses ==
- DeAngelo Glacier, in Antarctica
- Deangelo Vickers, a character in the television series The Office

== See also ==
- D'Angelo (disambiguation), a disambiguation page for "D'Angelo"
- De Ângelo (born 1997), a Brazilian singer-songwriter, also known as Grelo
- De Angelis, a page for "De Angelis"
