= Arbëreshë Seminary of Palermo =

- Seminari Arbëresh i Palermës
- Seminario Italo-Albanese
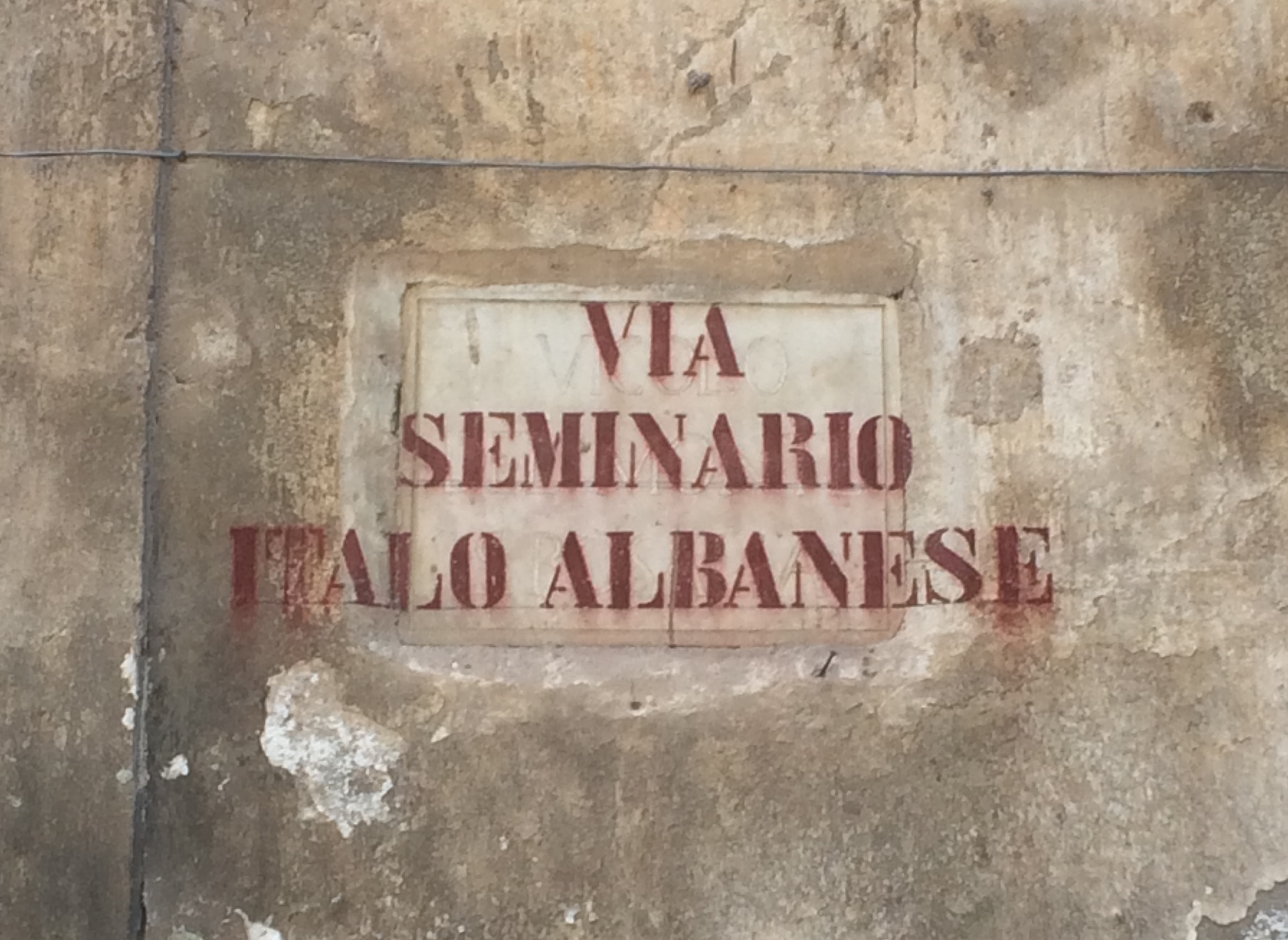
- The Historical Via Seminario Italo-Albanese, named after the seminary, in central Palermo

Location
- Palermo, Sicily; Italy
- 38°7′15.96″N 13°21′45.19″E

Information
- Type: Seminary (Greek-Catholic tradition)
- Religious affiliations: Italo-Albanian Catholic Church, Congregation for the Oriental Churches
- Founded: 1734
- Founder: The Venerable Father Giorgio Guzzetta
- Closed: 1943 (from 1950 active at Piana degli Albanesi)
- Language: Albanian Arbëresh, Koine
- Campus type: Urban
- Active: 1734-Today

The Arbëresh Seminary of Palermo, also known as the Italo-Albanian Seminary (Albanian: Seminari Arbëresh i Palermës; Italian: Seminario Italo-Albanese di Palermo, historically also "Seminario Greco"), was an important educational and cultural center for the Arbëreshë Albanian community in Sicily. The Seminary is situated in the historic center of Palermo, facing the magnificent post office building, between a street of the same name (Via Seminario Italo-Albanese) and Piazza Padre Giorgio Guzzetta. Founded in Palermo in 1734 by the Venerable Father Giorgio Guzzetta (in Albanian At Gjergj Guxeta), Apostle of the Albanians in Sicily and one of the foremost intellectuals of the Arbëreshë in the 18th century, the Seminary has for centuries been a bastion for preserving the Albanian language, culture, and traditions. It nurtured many intellectuals, priests, monks, distinguished bishops, writers, and renowned poets who also contributed to Albania, their homeland.

Since 1944, due to significant damage caused by American bombings of Palermo during World War II, its headquarters officially relocated to Piana degli Albanesi. The Seminary's premises, owned by the Italo-Albanian Catholic Church, have been modernized and leased to the Italian state as a school.

== History ==
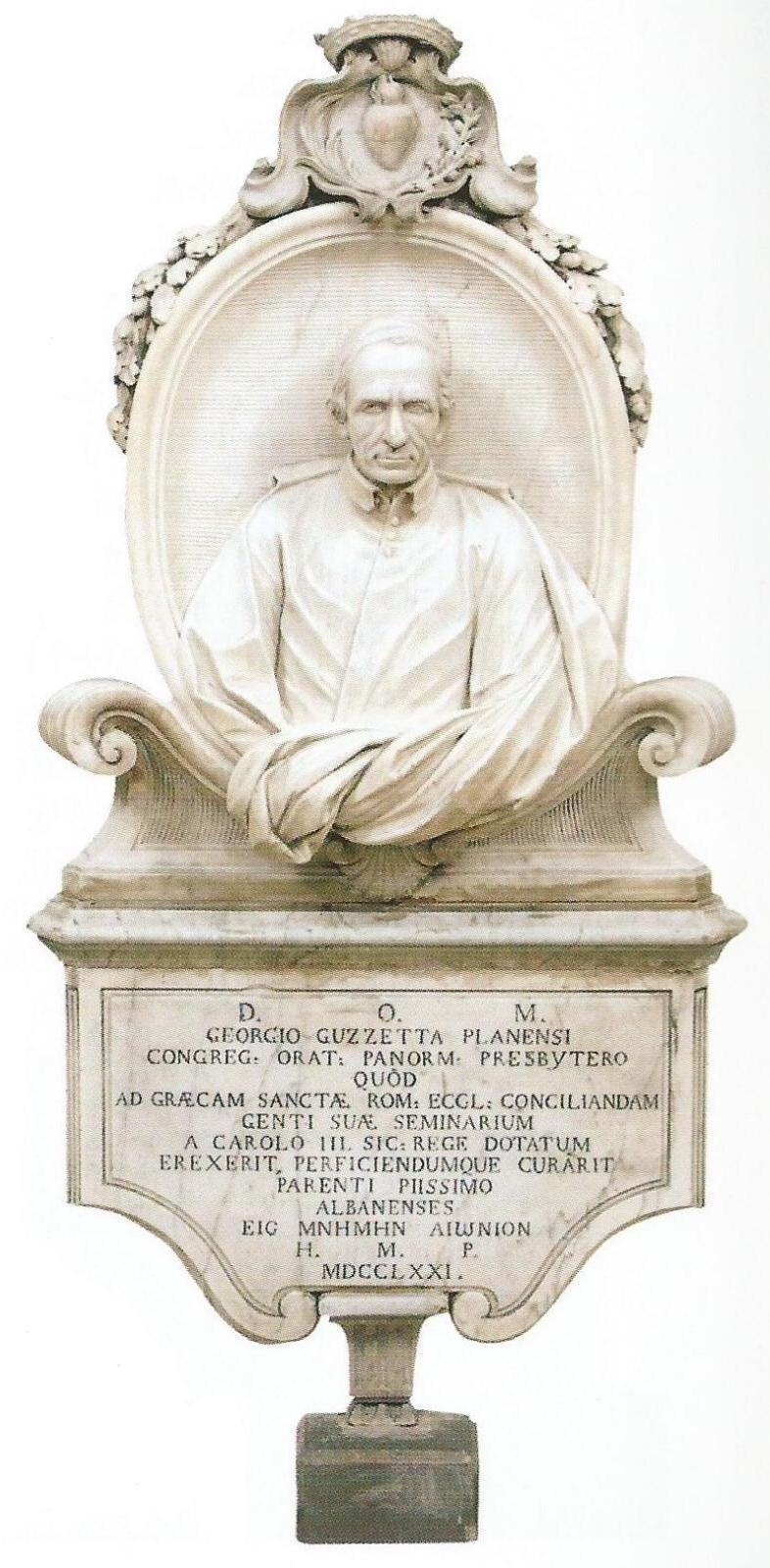
Monument to P. Giorgio Guzzetta, created by Ignazio Marabitti, at the Italo-Albanian Eparchial Seminary in Piana degli Albanesi, originating from the former Italo-Albanian Seminary of Palermo

During the pontificate of Pope Clement XI (1700–1721), of Albanian origin, and Clement XII (1730–1740), there was a renewed interest from the Holy See in the Byzantine Christian tradition, which manifested in the founding of the "Collegio Corsini" of Saint Benedict (San Benedetto Ullano, 1732) in Kozenxë (later transferred in 1794 to Saint Demetrius of Coronë, known as "Collegio San Adriano" for the Arbëresh communities of the Byzantine rite in Calabria), and the establishment of the Arbëresh Seminary of Palermo (1734) for the communities of Sicily.

The Arbëresh Seminary of Palermo was founded by Father Gjergj Guxeta (Italian: Padre Giorgio Guzzetta). This institution had the duty of welcoming and educating young people from the Arbëresh communities of the Byzantine rite present in Sicily. The Seminary thus became the most important religious and cultural center for the education - according to the Eastern Byzantine rite - of young generations of Arbëresh priests for their colonies in Sicily.

Father Gjergji Guxeta was the first rector of this center, serving for approximately ten years. He was succeeded by the priest Papa Pjetër d'Andrea from Himara, who in 1746 was appointed chaplain of the parish church of the Seminary of "Shën Kollit" (San Nicolò "dei Greci"), until his death on October 17 of the same year.

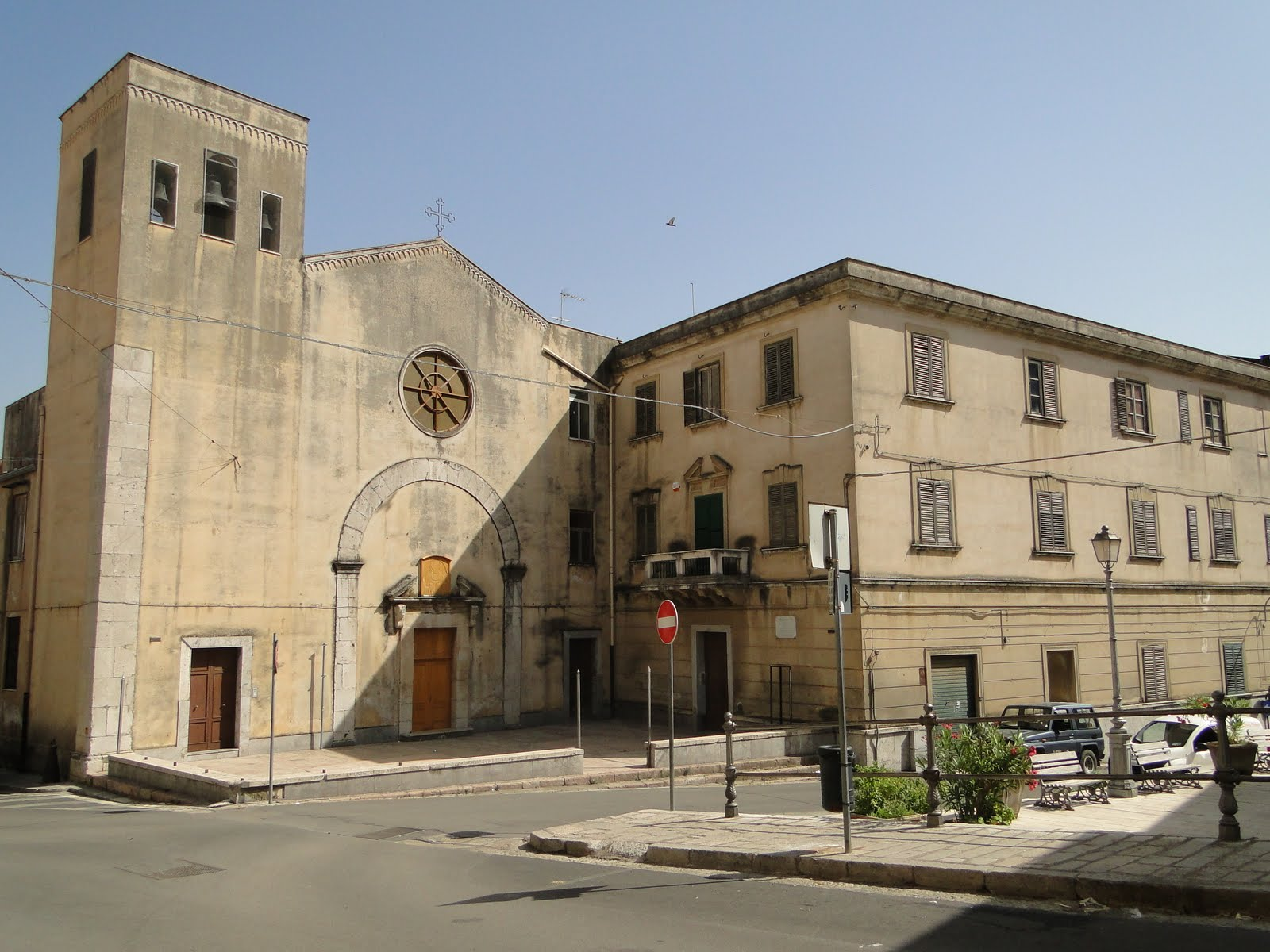
The episcopal seat (1937) close the Seminary of Piana degli Albanesi (1950), where the Italo-Albanian Seminary of Palermo was relocated in 1945

Following a valued collaboration from the early days of the same seminary, Father Guzzetta appointed Father Pal Maria Parrino (1710–1765) from Pallaci (Palazzo Adriano) as vice-rector in 1739, and in 1752 as rector of the Seminary he established in Palermo. After Guzzetta's tenure, Parrino became the second rector of the Italo-Albanian Seminary, a position he held from 1746 until 1765. He was assisted by Father Vasili Stasi (Italian: Basilio Stassi) from Piana degli Albanesi and Father Melchiorre Masi from Munxifsi (Mezzojuso).

== Seminary ==
=== Parish ===
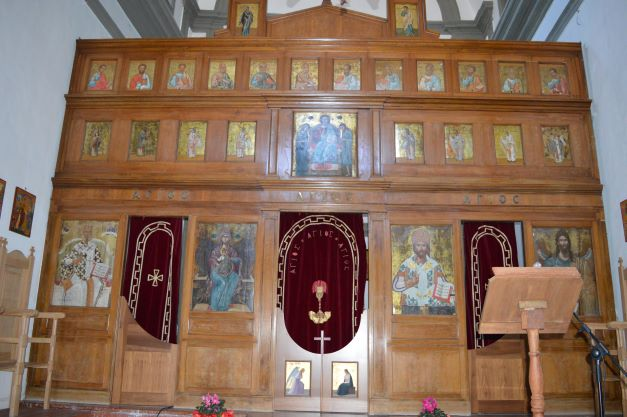
17th-century icons from the parish of the Italo-Albanian Seminary in Palermo, in Piana degli Albanesi since 1945.

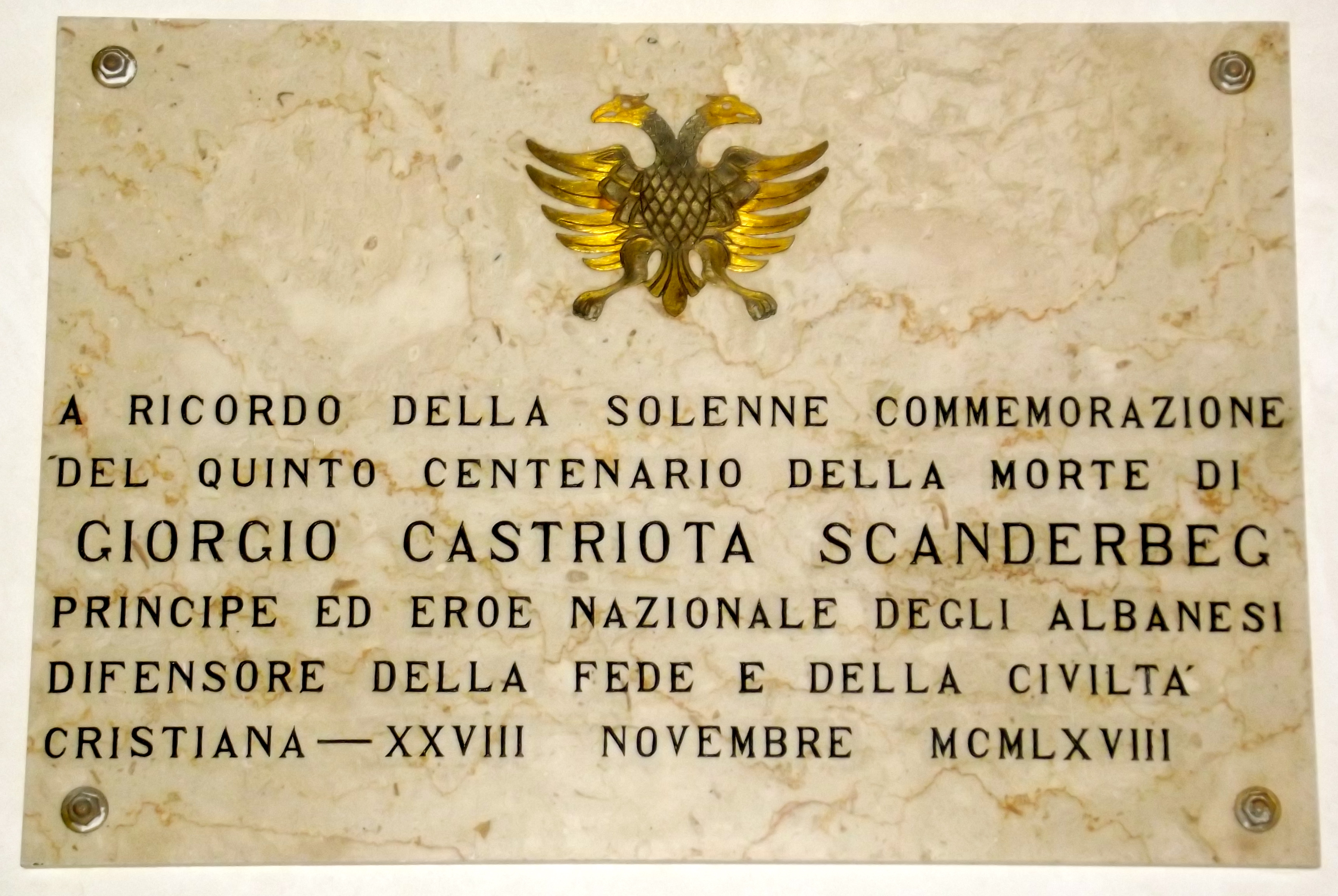
Marble plaque (1968) in memory of the Albanian hero Scanderbeg at the Italo-Albanian parish of Palermo.

Adjacent to the Seminary was the 16th-century Church of Saint Nicholas. During the bombings of 1943, the seminary and church were completely razed to the ground, and a new school building was built on the ruins. After initially housing a public high school, and later building a similar branch, the parish of Saint Nicholas or "dei Greci", a Catholic parish of the Byzantine rite, or "Greek rite." "Greek" was used to refer to the Albanian populations in Italy and Sicily who, starting in the 15th century, maintained the Byzantine rite, called the "Greek rite" by the Latins of the Roman rite, as well as their language, customs, and original identity. It was founded in 1547 by the Albanian Andrea Skramilja, with the help of the Albanian of Morea/Peloponnese Matteo Menkzo, near the Italo-Albanian Seminary in Palermo.

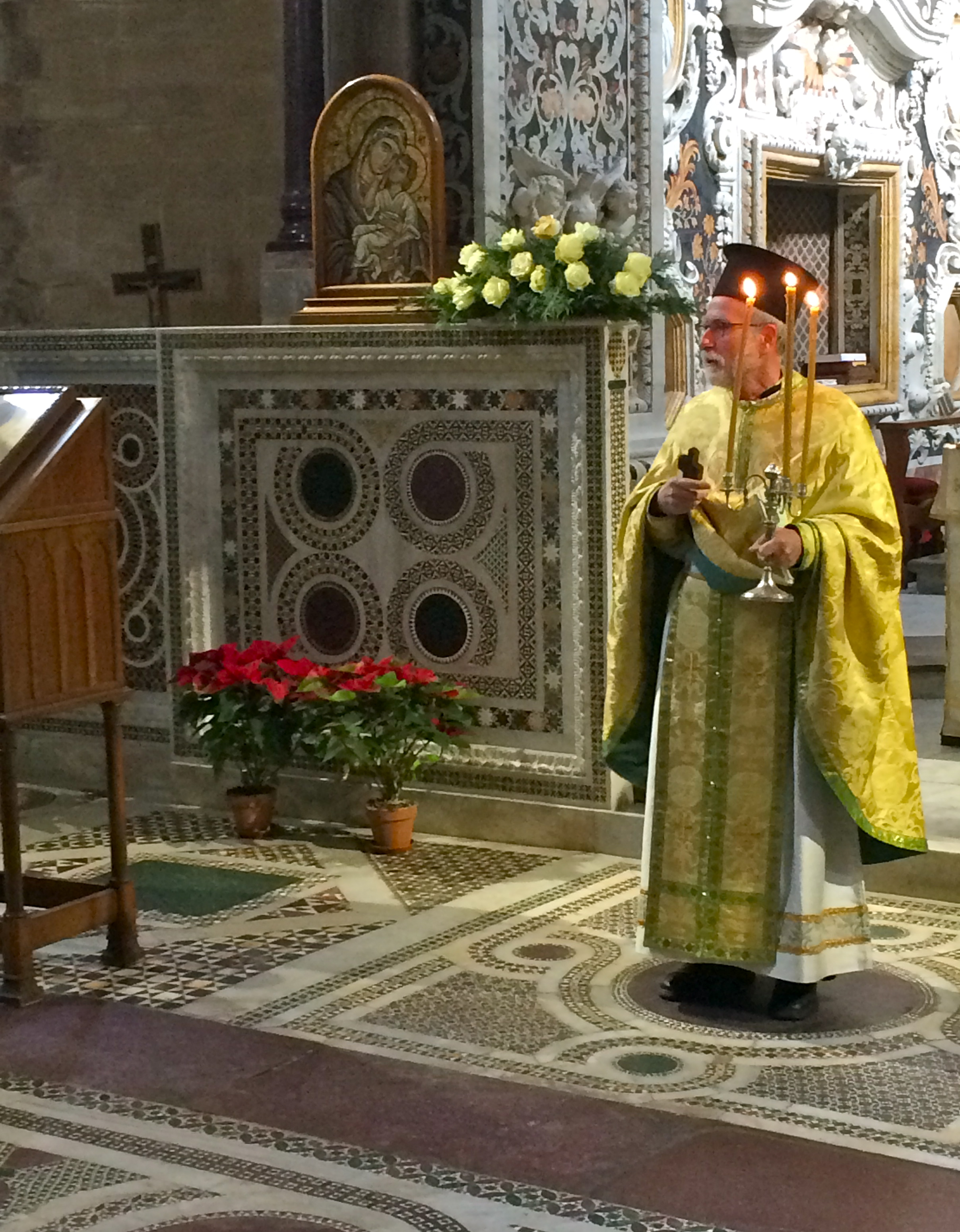
The Arbëreshë priest (Zoti or Papàs) at the Albanian Greek-Catholic parish of Palermo.

The first parish priest was Papa Kola Matrënga (1546-1549), who belonged to the married clergy, according to the discipline of the Byzantine Church. At that time, the great Albanian diaspora (migrations from the 15th to the 18th century) was in full swing, coming directly from Albania and the Albanian territories of the Balkans, Attica, and the Morea. Since then, these Albanian communities in Italy have preserved and cultivated their ethnic identity. The priests who attended the "Greek" parish in Palermo always came from Arbëria and the Arbëreshë colonies in the province of Palermo (Kundisa/Contessa Entellina, Munxifsi/Mezzojuso, Pallaci/Palazzo Adriano, Hora and Arbëreshëvet/Piana degli Albanesi, and later also from Sëndahstina/Santa Cristina Gela).

== See also ==
- Arbëreshë people
- Byzantine Rite
- Eastern Christianity
- Italo-Albanian Catholic Church
- Palermo
- Sicily
