= Kristen DeAngelis =

American microbiologist, environmental activist

- Education: University of California Berkeley (2006) Harvard University (1997)
- Known for: Research in Microbiology, Environmental Activist
- Website: https://kristendeangelis.net/

Kristen M. DeAngelis is a professor in the department of Microbiology at the University of Massachusetts where she studies soil microbes in relation to climate change.

== Early life and education ==
DeAngelis is originally from Watertown, Massachusetts. She graduated from Harvard University within the Biology department in 1997. DeAngelis received her Ph.D. in Microbiology from the University of California Berkeley in 2006. She subsequently worked as a Seaborg Postdoctoral Fellow at Lawrence Berkeley National Laboratory and in the Deconstruction Division at the Joint BioEnergy Institute

== Career and research ==
She is currently a lead researcher at the University of Massachusetts on soil microbes and their connection to global warming. Specifically, DeAngelis focuses on the adaptability of soil microbes and their responses to climate change in order to better understand soil ecology and its role as a carbon sink. Using plots of ground that have been artificially heated to $5^\circ C$ warmer than surrounding earth, DeAngelis, along with other qualified researchers, is attempting to simulate climate change and its potential effects on Earth. This is a part of a long term study at the Harvard Forest in Massachusetts, which has been going on since 1991. Her participation is key in discovering unexpected results, in which the scientists have observed changes in the composition and functional potential of soil bacterial communities which are correlated with alternating periods of accelerated and stationary CO_{2} release from the soils. Her current work evaluates the hypothesis that there is an evolutionary component to the soil bacterial response to long-term warming at this site.

Some of her past research includes studying the responses of microbes in the Arctic to thawing permafrost to better understand their role in the Earth's natural carbon cycle, and the potential production of biofuels by microbes. She also was involved in the development of a new technology to investigate microbes more in depth.

She offered paid internships at her lab at UMass to students of many ages, including high school seniors. Her interns' research results include information that may affect the availability of bio-fuels as well as understanding potential ecological responses to climate change.

=== Publications ===
One of DeAngelis' most cited articles pertains to relationships between functionality in the rhizosphere and oat root growth, specifically focusing on the effects of microbial organisms in this layer. Other significant publications include:

- Microbial communities acclimate to recurring changes in soil redox potential status, Environmental Microbiology (2010)
- Characterization of trapped lignin-degrading microbes in tropical forest soil, PLoS ONE (2011)
- Strategies for enhancing the effectiveness of metagenomic-based enzyme discovery in lignocellulolytic microbial communities, Bioenergy Research (2010)
- Bacterial quorum sensing and nitrogen cycling in rhizosphere soil, FEMS Microbiology Ecology (2008)
- Two novel bacterial biosensors for detection of nitrate availability in the rhizosphere, Applied and Environmental Microbiology (2010)

=== Memberships ===
DeAngelis has served the Ecological Society of America as Chair of the Microbiology Section (2015–16), Vice President (2014-15), and Secretary (2013–14)

=== Public engagement and activism ===
DeAngelis has participated in climate activist groups and marches, such as the one that took place in Massachusetts in early 2019. During this particular march, she interested hundreds of people in registering to vote within their counties in the United States in an attempt to increase political advocacy surrounding laws that affect the environment. She is also active within 500 Women Scientists Pod in Amherst, Massachusetts, where the group encourages scientific engagement from females around the world.

== Awards and honors ==
Funding for her most recent research was awarded by the federal government in 2018; she received two grants that will be financially dispersed over a period of 5 years, totaling around $2.5 million. This award was given to DeAngelis by the NSF (National Science Foundation) as a CAREER award (Faculty Early Career Development Program).
