= Apostolos Angelis (composer) =

Greek composer, engineer and producer

- Born: Apostolos Angelis; 1983 (age 42–43)
- Origin: Trikala, Greece
- Genres: Electronic, Classical, Orchestral, Baroque, Electronica, New Age, Ambient, Progressive
- Occupations: Composer, Arranger, Mixing Engineer, Musician, Producer
- Instruments: Keyboards, Synthesizers, Samplers, Percussion, Digital Audio Workstations
- Years active: 2004-present
- Label: Apoapsis Records
- Website: apostolosangelis.com

Apostolos Angelis (Greek: Απόστολος Αγγελής) is a Greek composer, engineer and producer of Εlectronic, Classical and Orchestral music.

Apostolos Angelis is from Trikala Thessaly, Greece, a self-taught musician who has learned composing music in his mind without keeping notes.

== Discography ==
=== Studio albums ===
- Hologram (2009)
- Prophecy Of Heavens (2012)
- The Mad And The Genius (2013)
- Kinesis (2014)
- Coloring Of Life (2017)
- Mythocosmos (2022)
