= Giorgio Stassi =

Italian scientist (born 1965)

Giorgio Stassi (born 22 June 1965, in Palermo) is an Italian scientist.

== Early life ==
He studied medicine at the University of Palermo and graduated in 1991, when he was awarded the university prize with special mention for his curriculum vitae and doctoral thesis. He became a specialist in Endocrinology in 1996.

== Career ==
Giorgio Stassi began his research activity in 1989 at the Medical Immunology Laboratory of the Institute of Clinical Medicine at the University of Palermo, focusing on the study of the molecular mechanisms regulating programmed cell death (apoptosis), a field that was becoming central in international biomedical research. His contribution clarified the role of apoptosis in Hashimoto’s thyroiditis and other endocrine diseases. Stassi quickly established himself as a reference figure in the fields of immunology, experimental endocrinology and cell biology.

In 1997, he moved to the Rangos Research Center (PA, USA), under the supervision of Prof. M. Trucco, where he worked on the pathogenesis of diabetes mellitus and further explored the molecular bases of autoimmune diseases, broadening his expertise in translational medicine. Upon returning to Italy in 2000, thanks to a Telethon grant he set up a Molecular and Cell Biology laboratory at the Department of Experimental Medicine of the University of Palermo, continuing and expanding studies on the role of cell death in the pathogenesis of autoimmune diseases. In his early years at the University of Palermo, Stassi and his group published a series of papers in top‑impact journals such as Science, Nature, Journal of Immunology, Journal of Experimental Medicine and Nature Immunology, making an essential contribution to understanding the pathogenic mechanisms of autoimmune diseases. In 2002, he became Head of the Cellular and Molecular Pathophysiology Laboratory at the Department of Surgical and Oncological Disciplines of the University of Palermo, initiating a close integration with clinical activity. In this context, he identified the mechanisms that regulate the survival and resistance of epithelial tumor cells to conventional therapies, laying the groundwork for new treatment strategies. These discoveries had a fundamental impact on cancer research, enabling Stassi to file five patents related to the development of new neoadjuvant anticancer therapies for colon, breast and thyroid tumors. One of these patents has been granted and is currently held by the German company Apogenix GmbH, Heidelberg, testifying to the translational relevance of the results obtained. One of Stassi’s distinctive features is his ability to identify, ahead of time, the most promising and innovative areas of biomedical research, steering his laboratory towards topics with high translational potential. In recent years, his scientific interest has focused on the role of cancer stem cells in the onset, progression and recurrence of epithelial tumors, particularly of the colon, breast and thyroid. His group was among the first to isolate and propagate stem cells from colon and thyroid tumors, developing original experimental models that made it possible to define one of the main mechanisms of chemoresistance of colon cancer stem cells and to propose new therapeutic strategies for neoplasms traditionally considered to have a poor prognosis. The results of these studies have been published in prestigious international journals, including Cell Stem Cell, Nature Cell Biology, Nature, Nature Communications, Nature Cancer, Nature Reviews Drug Discovery, Gastroenterology, Gut and PNAS. In parallel with cancer stem‑cell research, Stassi has developed a long‑standing interest in the use of stem cells in regenerative medicine and in transplant immunology, exploring how mechanisms of cell death and survival influence tissue regeneration and immune tolerance. These research lines integrate his expertise in apoptosis, immunology and stem‑cell biology, contributing to the development of innovative approaches for the treatment of degenerative diseases and the improvement of transplant outcomes.

Stassi’s laboratory is strongly oriented towards innovation and technology transfer. The platforms dedicated to the study of cancer stem cells, stem cells for regenerative medicine and immunological mechanisms in transplantation, together with the development of preclinical models and the analysis of treatment responses, have fostered the establishment of structured collaborations with major international pharmaceutical companies such as Eli Lilly, Roche, Pfizer, Merck, AmCure and HiberCell, which have supported the laboratory over time through specific research agreements. In parallel, his intense scientific production has allowed him to achieve a high average impact factor above 12, with 200 publications in total (153 original articles, 34 reviews and 13 book chapters), an H‑index of 80 with 30,853 citations (Google Scholar) and an H‑index of 69 with 21,701 citations (Scopus).

Over the course of his career, Stassi has obtained numerous competitive national and international grants for a total value of over 200 million euros, which have supported and continue to support research programs aimed at developing targeted therapies against cancer stem cells and exploiting the therapeutic potential of stem cells in the regenerative field. These include projects funded through National Operational Programs (PON), FIRB, PO FESR, PNR, PRIN, AIRC, as well as major initiatives linked to the National Recovery and Resilience Plan (PNRR), particularly Mission 4 “Education and Research”, PNC E.3 2022 “Innovative Health Ecosystem”, Investment 2.1 “Enhancement and strengthening of biomedical research in the National Health Service”, and projects within the Health Operational Plan (FSC 2014–2020), Trajectory 3 “Regenerative, predictive and personalized medicine”, and the Horizon 2020 – Marie Skłodowska‑Curie Actions (MSCA) Doctoral Network of the European Commission.

Giorgio Stassi’s research has focused on the biology of autoimmune diseases and epithelial tumors, integrating basic and translational research with regenerative medicine and the development of therapeutic approaches. He collaborates with national and international research institutions and has worked on projects related to targeted therapies involving cancer stem cells and stem cell applications in tissue regeneration.

He has a long‑standing and continuous track record of pre‑doctoral tutoring, having supervised more than 80 degree theses in Medicine and Surgery, Medical Biotechnology, Biotechnology for Industry and Scientific Research, Biology and Biology Applied to Biomedicine at the Universities of Palermo, Pisa, Milan, Milano‑Bicocca and Trento. The theses under his supervision have covered advanced topics such as autoimmune diseases, experimental oncology, tumor immunology, therapeutic strategies for metastatic neoplasms, cancer stem cells and normal stem cells applied to regenerative medicine, significantly contributing to the scientific and methodological training of students. He has carried out intensive and continuous tutoring and supervision, personally mentoring more than 100 PhD students and acting as thesis supervisor in PhD programs in Surgical Endocrinology, Oncology and Hematologic Oncology, Immunopharmacology, Pathophysiology of Metabolic Bone Diseases, Experimental Hematology, Cellular and Molecular Oncopathology, Diagnostic Sciences and Technologies in the Biomedical Field, Cell and Developmental Biology, Experimental Oncology and Surgery, Molecular and Clinical Medicine and Precision Medicine at the University of Palermo, at University College London and at Amsterdam University Medical Center(UMC). He has an extensive and continuous record of post‑doctoral tutoring, having served as Tutor for more than 120 post‑doctoral fellows at numerous national and international institutions, including the University of Palermo, Istituto Superiore di Sanità, Salvatore Maugeri Foundation in Pavia, University of Pavia, University of Michigan (Massachusetts, USA), Telethon, the Italian Association for Cancer Research (AIRC), University of Rome “La Sapienza” and Amsterdam University Medical Center (UMC). His tutoring activity includes scientific supervision of research projects, support in experimental planning and critical interpretation of results, as well as guidance in writing manuscripts, competitive project proposals and scientific reports. He also provides career mentoring for academic and translational paths, fostering the acquisition of scientific independence, group leadership skills and competencies in managing interdisciplinary and international collaborations.

He currently serves as Director of the Department of Precision Medicine in the Medical, Surgical and Critical Care Area (Me.Pre.C.C.) at the University of Palermo, Academic Senator appointed by the Rector for the promotion of Life Sciences, and coordinator of the related University activities. Previously, he was Scientific Director of the Mediterranean Oncology Institute (IOM, Viagrande–Catania) and, before that, Head of the Cellular and Molecular Oncology Unit at the Salvatore Maugeri Foundation in Pavia, where he strengthened his expertise in governance, strategic planning, and the integration of basic, translational and clinical research.

== Honors ==
- 1991 Winner of the scholarship for medical residents (art. 6, Italian Law Decree 257/91) for the School of Specialization in “Endocrinology and Metabolic Diseases”;
- 1997 Cover issue, Science, 275:1997;
- 1998 Cover issue, Circulation, 98:1998;
- 1998 Young Investigator Award, University of Palermo;
- 1999 Cover issue, Blood, 93:1999;
- 1999 Cover issue, Circulation Research, 85:1999;
- 2004 Cover issue, FASEB Journal, 18:2004;
- 2004 Award within the National Stem Cell Program (file 515°) for the characterization and purification of stem cells from solid tumors and the transfer of tumors generated by these cells in animal models;
- 2004 Award (call of 26 January 2004, FABT) for the development of advanced technologies for sensitizing tumor cells;
- 2009 “L’Altra Italia – Vite da Premio” Award, “Scientific Research” section;
- 2010 Cover issue, Gastroenterology, 138:2010;
- 2021 International Federation of Journalists and Travel Writers Award for “Scientific Progress in Oncology”;
- 2024 Ambassador of Sicilian Culture and Identity, Associazione della Cultura Teatro L. Giani;
- 2024 Ambassador for advances in translational medicine and resilience for future generations of researchers in Southern Italy, HEAL Italia Foundation;
- 2026 Career Award for research in clinical and experimental oncology, “Carlo Chianello” Foundation.

== Patents ==
- Sensitizing cells for apoptosis by selectively blocking cytokines. US2006257401 – 2006-11-16;
- Method for the purification and amplification of tumoral stem cells. EP1805299 – 2007-07-11;
- Sensitizing cells for apoptosis by selectively blocking cytokines. EP1592449 – 2005-11-09;
- Antibody specific for Human IL-4 for Treatment of Cancer. WO2007107349 – 2007-09-27;
- Combination of kinase inhibitor for treating colorectal cancer.

== Research focus ==
His profile builds on a solid background in immunology, endocrinology and cell biology, with pioneering contributions on apoptosis in autoimmune diseases and diabetes mellitus. Subsequently, his research has focused on the survival, treatment resistance and plasticity of cancer stem cells, helping to define their role in tumor initiation, progression, metastasis and chemo‑resistance across several solid malignancies (colon, thyroid, breast, lung, central nervous system), using in vitro and in vivo preclinical models and “tumor‑on‑chip” platforms integrating immune and stromal components. In immunology, his focused on mechanisms of immune escape in transplantation, the biology of T lymphocytes and NK cells, advanced cellular immunotherapies (including γδ T cells, T effector cells and CAR‑like approaches), tumor stem cell‑mediated immunoregulation, and the identification of biomarkers predictive of response to immunotherapy. In parallel, he has developed regenerative medicine projects and studies on the interactions among metabolism, obesity, the adipose tumor microenvironment and cancer, spanning from tissue engineering to cell‑based therapies.

Stassi's work has allowed the acquisition of multi-omics platforms (genomics, bulk and single cell transcriptomics, epigenomics, proteomics, metagenomics) tightly integrated with clinical practice, to establish core facilities for experimental pathology and multiplex tissue imaging for spatial characterization of the microenvironment in order to build infrastructures for big data management and for the application of machine learning/AI algorithms in support of precision medicine, and to strengthen technology transfer and the creation of deep tech start ups.
