= St. Nicholas of Myra Cathedral, Lungro =

St. Nicholas of Myra Cathedral
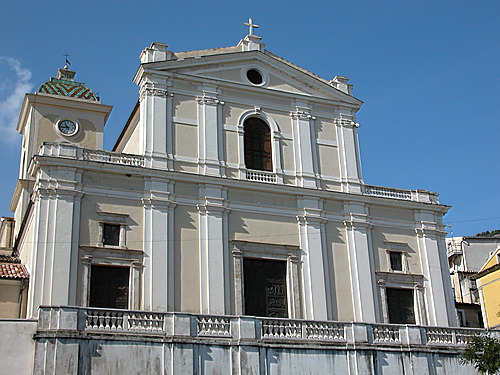
- St. Nicholas of Myra Cathedral
- 39.7422°N 16.1223°E
- Location: Lungro
- Country: Italy
- Denomination: Catholic church (Italo-Albanese or Byzantine rite)

The St. Nicholas of Myra Cathedral (Italian: Cattedrale di S. Nicola di Mira Albanian: Kryekisha e Shën Kollit) or Albanian Catholic Cathedral of Lungro also called Lungro Cathedral It is the main church of the Catholic Eparchy of Lungro, the Albanian seat for Calabria and continental Italy since 1919, which has jurisdiction over all the Albanian Catholic parishes of the South who practice the Byzantine Catholic rite.

It is located on the Via De Rada, in the middle part of the city center, overlooking the large square in an elevated position, where there is a bust dedicated to Skanderbeg.

The cathedral, built in the 18th century after the destruction of the previous structure, stands out for its size among all the other churches in the district.

== See also ==
- Roman Catholicism in Italy
- Saint Nicholas of Myra

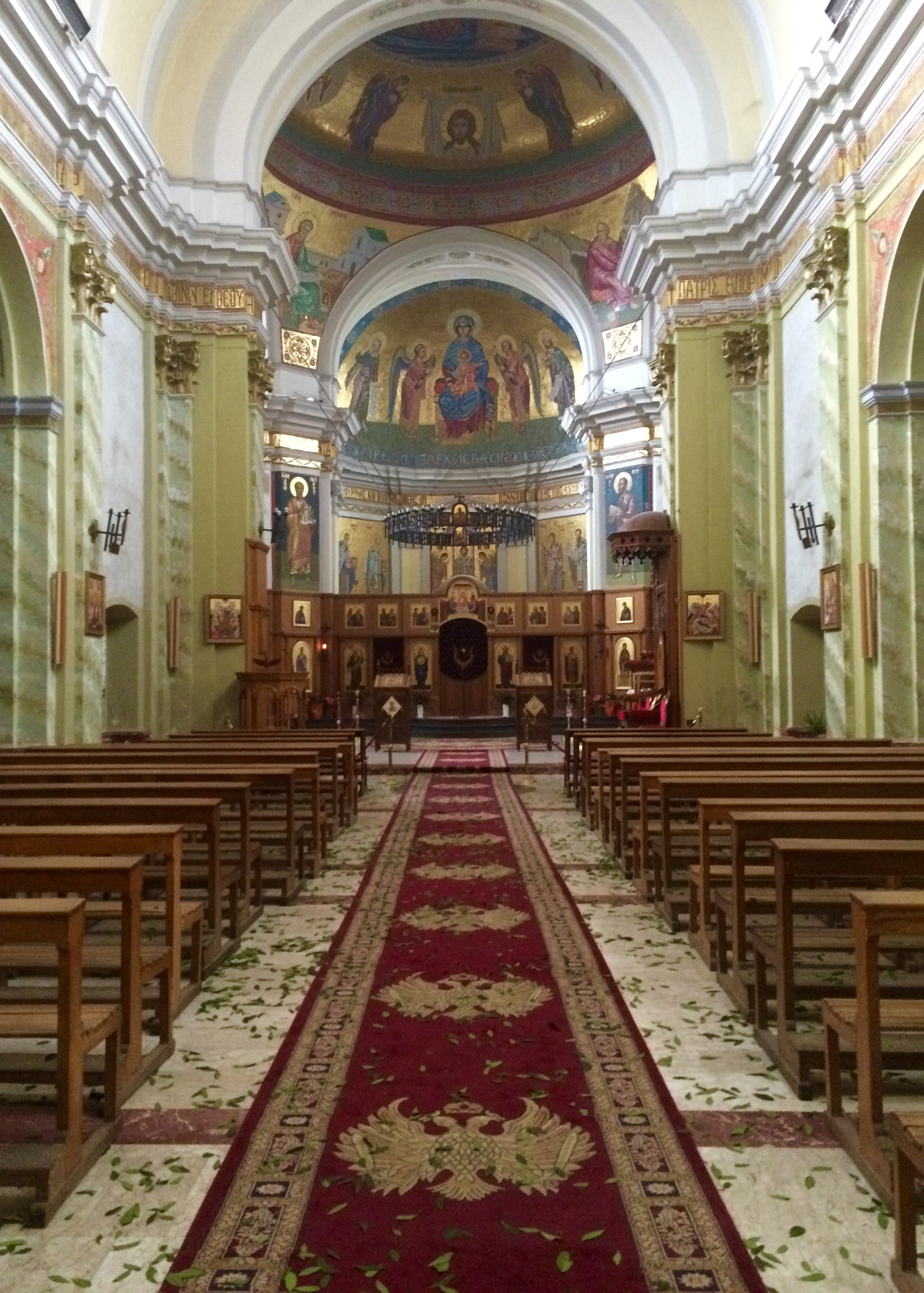
Internal View
