= Italo-Albanian Catholic Church =

Eastern Catholic church

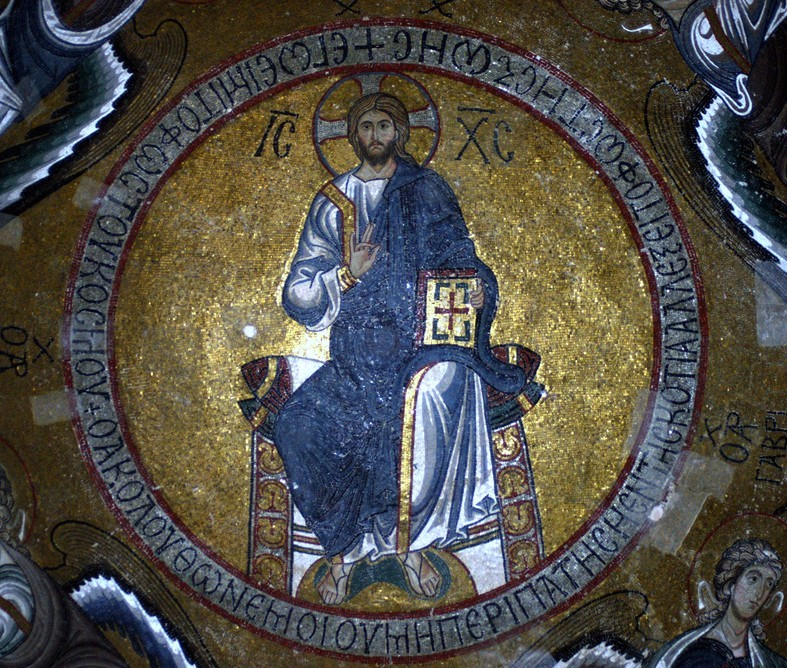
- Byzantine Catholic mosaic of Christ Pantocrator in the Italo-Albanian Parish in Palermo, Sicily (Italy)
- Type: Particular church (sui iuris)
- Classification: Christian
- Orientation: Eastern Catholic
- Polity: Episcopal
- Governance: Synod
- Structure: Tri-ordinariate
- Pope: Leo XIV
- Leader: Donato Oliverio; (Eparch of Lungro); Raffaele De Angelis; (Eparch of Piana degli Albanesi); Manuel Nin; (Abbot Ordinary of Santa Maria di Grottaferrata)
- Associations: Dicastery for the Eastern Churches
- Region: Southern Italy, Sicily, Lazio (Diaspora: Argentina, Brazil, United States; historically in Albania, Corsica, Malta)
- Liturgy: Byzantine Rite
- Origin: 10 June 1732: Ordinariate of the Italo-Albanians of the Byzantine rite of Calabria appointed
- Branched from: Catholic Church
- Congregations: 45
- Ministers: 82 priests, 5 deacons
- Other names: Italo-Albanian Greek-Catholic Church; Chiesa Cattolica Italo-Albanese; Kisha Bizantine Arbëreshe
- Official website: Eparchy of Lungro; Eparchy of Piana degli Albanesi; Territorial Abbacy of Saint Mary of Grottaferrata

The Italo-Albanian Catholic Church (Note: Latin: Ecclesia Catholica Italo-Albanica; Italian: Chiesa Cattolica Italo-Albanese; Albanian: Klisha Arbëreshe) or Italo-Albanian Byzantine-Catholic Church is one of the 23 Eastern Catholic Churches which, together with the Latin Church, comprise the Catholic Church. It is an autonomous (sui juris) particular church in full communion with the pope of Rome, directly subject to the Roman Dicastery for the Oriental Churches. It follows the Byzantine rite, the ritual and spiritual traditions that are common in most of the Eastern Church. It uses two liturgical languages: Koine Greek, the traditional language of the Eastern Churches, and Albanian, the native language of most of its adherents.

The Italo-Albanian Catholic Church is composed of three ecclesiastical districts: it is headed by two eparchies, that of Lungro in Calabria, that of Piana degli Albanesi in Sicily, and a Territorial Abbacy of Saint Mary of Grottaferrata in Lazio, whose Basilian monks come largely from the Italo-Albanian settlements. It does not have a metropolitan, but is instead led by two eparchs and a territorial abbot. The Church also operates among the Italo-Albanian diaspora in North and South America. It has about 80,000 members.

The Italo-Albanian Catholic Church extends its jurisdiction over the Italo-Albanian people, who are the descendants of the exiled Albanians that fled to Italy in the 15th century under the pressure of the Turkish persecutions in Albania, Epirus, Macedonia, Attica and Morea (Peloponnese). For over five centuries, they have managed, as a diaspora, to retain their language, religious aspect, culture and customs. Nowadays, they reside in Southern Italy (Abruzzo, Apulia, Basilicata, Calabria, Campania, Molise, Sicily), as well as in Central Italy, where they are present only in the Monastery of Grottaferrata in the Lazio region.

The Italo-Albanian Catholic Church considers itself the heir of the traditional Illyricum Church, and is closely linked to the Albanian Greek-Catholic Church, with which it shares a common history and traditions. The fact that the church has never broken away from the See of Rome is a rare testimony – another example being the Maronites – of the persistent unity of the church despite its diversity of traditions.

== Name ==
The Byzantine rite was brought to Italy in the 15th century by Albanian exiles fleeing from Albania, Epirus and Morea because of persecution by Muslim Ottoman Turks. Italy had already known Eastern Christian rites in previous centuries, but these had since disappeared. The Albanians, Orthodox united in Rome with the Council of Ferrara-Florence, brought with them language, customs, and belief, zealously keeping the Byzantine rite and naturally bridging between East and West. The Italo-Albanian Catholic Church is therefore characterized by a specific ethnic group: the Albanians of Italy, Arbëreshë or Italo-Albanesi. The Albanian ethno-linguistic group of Italy has managed to maintain its identity, having in the clergy the strongest guardian and the fulcrum of ethnic identification.

The only place where the Byzantine Rite remained in Italy was the Monastery of Grottaferrata, a Byzantine foundation which had become steadily latinized through the centuries. The Albanians of Sicily and Calabria, from the eighteenth to the present, were bringing the monastery back to life, where most of its monks, abbots and students were and are Italo-Albanian.

== History ==
=== Byzantine period ===
The conquest of Italy by the Byzantine Empire in the Gothic War (535–554) began a Byzantine period that included the Byzantine domination of the papacy from 537 to 752.

It is uncertain whether the Byzantine Rite was followed in any diocese of Southern Italy or Sicily before the 8th century. The spread of Greek monasticism in Italy received a strong impulse from the Rashidun Caliphate invasion of the Levant and Egypt, and later from the ban on religious images or icons. The monks naturally retained their rite, and as the bishops were not infrequently chosen from their number, the diocesan liturgy, under favourable conditions, could easily be changed, especially since the Lombard occupation of the inland regions of Southern Italy cut off the Greeks in the South from communication with the Latin Church.

When, in 726, Leo III the Isaurian withdrew Southern Italy from the patriarchal jurisdiction of Rome and gave it to the Patriarch of Constantinople, the process of Hellenization became more rapid; it received a further impulse when, on account of the Muslim conquest of Sicily, Greeks and Hellenized Sicilians fled to Calabria and Apulia. Still, it was not rapid enough to suit the Byzantine emperors, who feared that those regions would once again fall under the influence of the West, as had the Duchy of Rome and the Exarchate of Ravenna. Finally, after the Saxon emperors had made a formidable attempt to drive the Greeks from the peninsula, Emperor Nikephoros II Phokas and the Patriarch Polyeuctus made it obligatory on the bishops, in 968, to adopt the Byzantine Rite. This order aroused lively opposition in some quarters, as at Bari, under Bishop Giovanni. Nor was it executed in other places immediately and universally. Cassano and Taranto, for instance, are said to have always maintained the Roman Rite. At Trani, in 983, Bishop Rodostamo was allowed to retain the Roman Rite, as a reward for aiding in the surrender of the city to the Greeks. In every diocese there were always some churches which never forsook the Roman Rite; on the other hand, long after the restoration of that rite, there remained Greek churches with native Greek clergy.

=== Re-Latinization ===
The restoration of the Roman Rite began with the Norman conquest in the 11th century, especially in the first period of the conquest, when Norman ecclesiastics were appointed bishops. Another potent factor was the reform of Pope Gregory VII, who in his efforts to repress marriage among the Latin clergy found no small obstacle in the example of the Greek priests. However, he and his successors recognized the Byzantine Rite and discipline wherever it was in legitimate possession. Moreover, the Latin bishops ordained the Greek as well as the Latin clergy. In the course of time the Norman princes gained the affection of their Greek subjects by respecting their rite, which had strong support in the numerous Basilian monasteries (in the 15th century there were still seven of them in the Archdiocese of Rossano alone). The Latinization of the dioceses was complete in the 16th century. Among those which held out longest for the Byzantine Rite were Acerenza (and perhaps Gravina), 1302; Gerace, 1467; Oppido, 1472 (when it was temporarily united to Gerace); Rossano, 1460; Gallipoli, 1513; Bova (to the time of Gregory XIII), etc. But even after that time, many Greek priests remained in some dioceses. In that of Otranto, in 1583, there were still two hundred Greek priests, nearly all native. At Reggio, Calabria, Count Ruggiero in 1092 had given the Greeks the church of S. Maria della Cattolica, whose clergy had a Protopope, exempt from the jurisdiction of the bishop; this was the case until 1611. In 1695 there were in the same dioceses fifty-nine Greek priests; after thirty years there was only one. Rossano still had a Greek clergy in the 17th century. The few native Greek priests were afterwards absorbed in the tide of immigration (see below). Of the Basilian monasteries the only one left is that of Grottaferrata, near Rome. In Sicily the Latinization was, for two reasons, accomplished more easily and radically. First, during Muslim rule most of the dioceses were left without bishops, so that the installation of Latin bishops encountered no difficulty; secondly, the Normans had come as liberators, and not as conquerors.

Important Greek colonies, founded chiefly for commercial reasons, were located at Venice, Ancona (where they obtained from Clement VII and Paul III the church of S. Anna, which they lost in 1833, having been declared schismatical in 1797), Bari, Lecce (where, even in the 19th century, in the church of S. Nicola, Divine worship was carried on in the Greek tongue, though in the Roman Rite), Naples (where they have the church of SS. Pietro e Paolo, erected in 1526 by Tommaso Paleologo Assagni), Leghorn (where they have the church of the Annunziata, 1607).

In Rome there was always a large colony observing the Greek Rite. From the end of the 6th century until the ninth and tenth there were several Greek monasteries among which were Cella Nova, near S. Saba; S. Erasmo; San Silvestro in Capite; the monastery next to Santa Maria Antiqua at the foot of the Palatine. Like other nations, the Greeks before the year 1000 had their own schola at Rome. It was near the church of Santa Maria in Cosmedin. Even in the pontifical liturgy - at least on some occasions - a few of the chanted passages were in Greek: the custom of singing the Epistle and Gospel in both Latin and Greek dates from that period.

=== Albanian influx ===
Besides the first large emigration of Albanians which took place between 1467 and 1470, after the death of the celebrated Gjergj Kastrioti Skanderbeg (when his great granddaughter, Erina Castriota who had become the Princess of Bisignano, invited her countrymen to the Kingdom of Naples), there were two others, one under Ottoman Empire Sultan Selim II (1566–1574), directed to the ports along the Adriatic Sea and to Livorno; the other about 1740. In the course of time, owing to assimilation with the surrounding population, the number of these Italo-Greeks diminished, and not a few of their villages became entirely Latin.

To educate the clergy of these Greeks, Pope Gregory XIII founded in 1577 at Rome the Greek College of St. Athanasius, which served also for the Greek Catholics of the East and for the Ruthenians, until a special college was instituted for the latter purpose by Pope Leo XIII. Among the alumni of St. Athanasius was the celebrated Leo Allatius. Another Greek-Byzantine ecclesiastical college was founded at Piana degli Albanesi in 1715 by P. Giorgio Guzzetta, founder of an Oratory of celibate Greek-Byzantine clergy. At Firmo the seminary of SS. Pietro e Paolo existed from 1663, erected by the Propaganda to supply priests for Albania. It was suppressed in 1746. Finally Pope Clement XII, in 1736, founded the Corsini College in the ancient Abbey of San Benedetto Ullano in the charge of a resident bishop or archbishop of the Greek Rite. Later it was transferred in 1794 to San Demetrio Corone, in the ancient Basilian monastery of S. Adriano. Since 1849, however, and especially since 1860, this college has lost its ecclesiastical character and is now secularized.

Seminaries for the Albanians of Italy were set up in San Benedetto Ullano, and then in San Demetrio Corone, (Calabria) in 1732 and in Palermo, Sicily, in 1734.

=== Ecclesiastical status ===
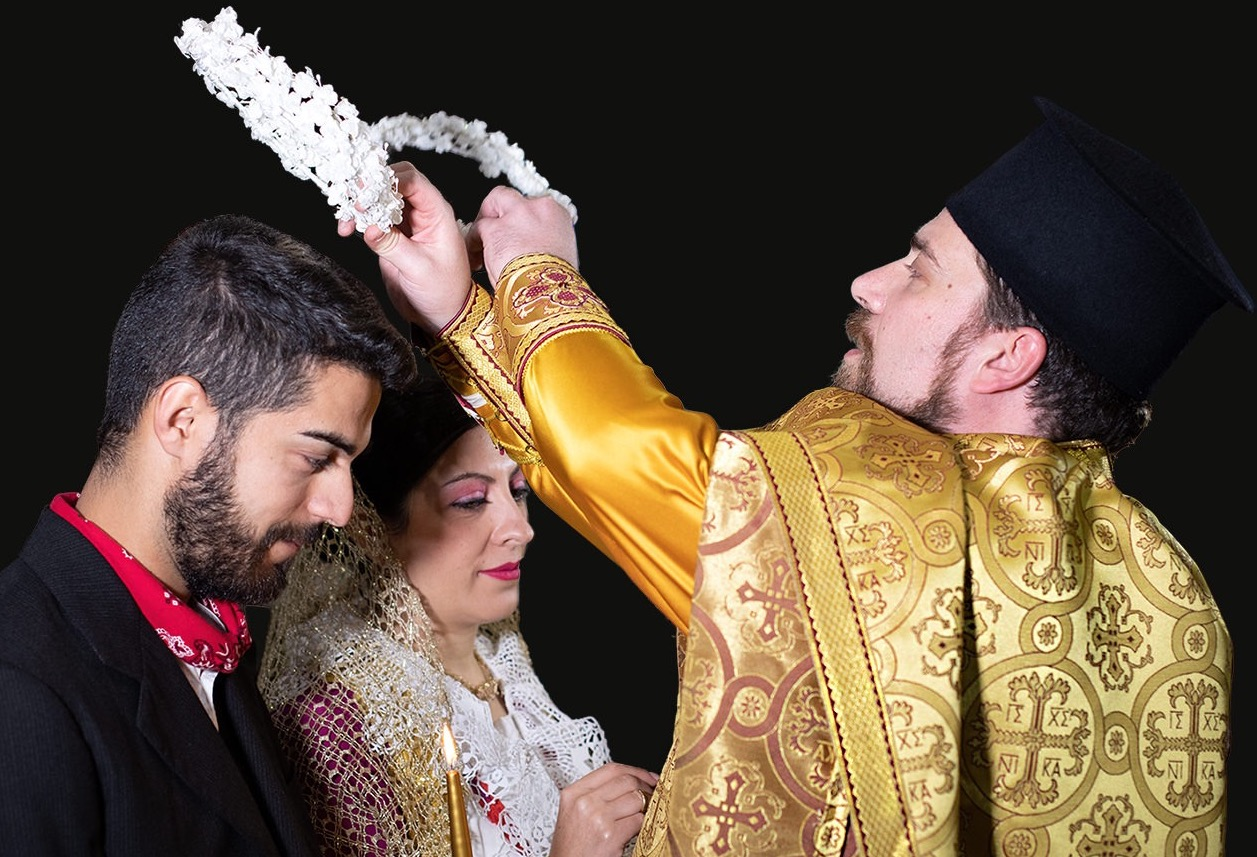
Crowning rite during an Italo-Albanian wedding in Calabria

Until 1919, the Italo-Greeks were subject to the jurisdiction of the Latin diocesan bishops. However, the popes at times appointed a titular archbishop, resident in Rome, for the ordination of their priests. When Clement XII established the Corsini College at San Benedetto Ullano in 1736, he placed it in charge of a resident bishop or archbishop of the Greek Rite. Pope Benedict XIV, in the papal bull "Etsi pastoralis" (1742), collected, co-ordinated and completed the various enactments of his predecessors, and this Bull was still law in 1910, regulating the transfer of clergy and lay people between the communities of the Greek Church and Latin Church, and specifying that children of mixed marriages would be subject to the Latin Church.

=== Sui juris ===
On 6 February 1784, the pre-diocesan ordinariate of the Albanians in Sicily was created, with Bishop Papàs Giorgio Stassi, titular Bishop of Lampsacus, first holding that position.

By 1909, another Ordinary for the Greeks of Calabria was residing at Naples.

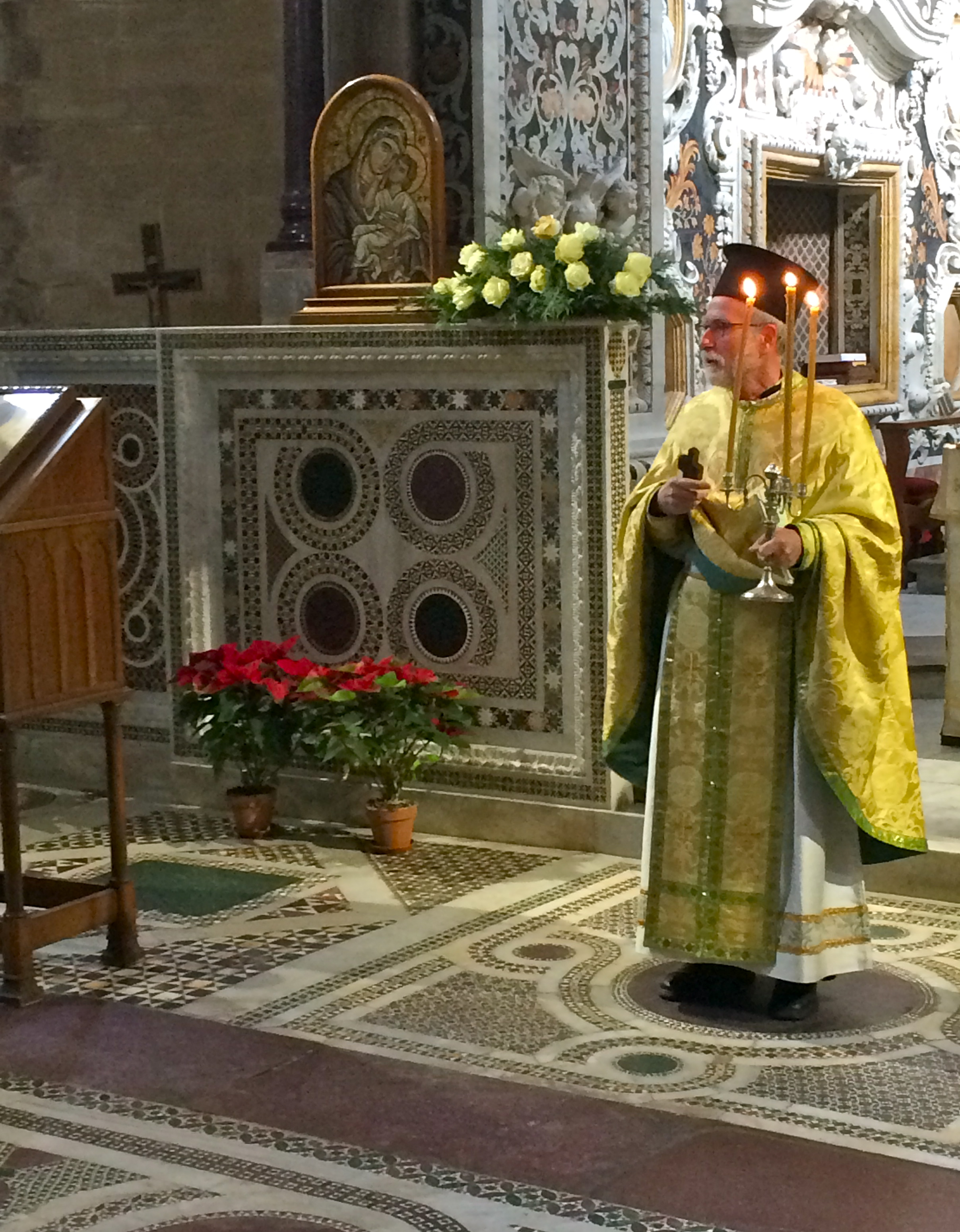
An Italo-Albanian priest in Sicily during the rites of the Theophany

The 20th century saw the foundation in 1919 of the Eparchy of Lungro (an Eastern Catholic bishopric) in Calabria, which serves Byzantine-Rite Albanians in mainland Italy, and on 26 October 1937 of the Eparchy of Piana dei Greci for those in Sicily promoted from the Ordinariate of Sicilia. One month before the foundation of the Eparchy of Piana dei Greci in 1937, the Byzantine-Rite Monastery of Saint Mary of Grottaferrata, not far from Rome, was given the status of a territorial abbacy, separating it from the jurisdiction of the local bishop. In October 1940, the three ordinaries held an inter-eparchial synod for preserving their Byzantine traditions and unity with an Orthodox Church of Albania observation delegation. On 25 October 1941, the Eparchy of Piana dei Greci was renamed as the Eparchy of Piana degli Abanesi / Eparkia or Eparhia e Horës së Arbëreshëvet.

In 2004 and 2005, a second inter-eparchial synod was held in three sessions approving 10 documents covering "the synod's theological and pastoral context, the use of Scripture, catechesis, liturgy, formation of clergy, canon law, ecumenical and interreligious relations, relations with other Eastern Catholic Churches, re-evangelization and mission". They were submitted to the Holy See and were still in dialogue as of mid-2007 in regards to their promulgation.

== Organisation ==
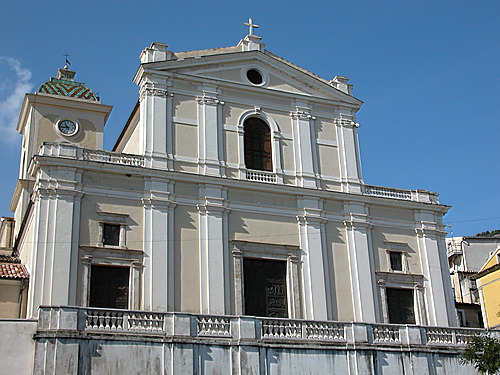
St. Nicholas of Myra Cathedral, Lungro of the Albanians of the continental Italy

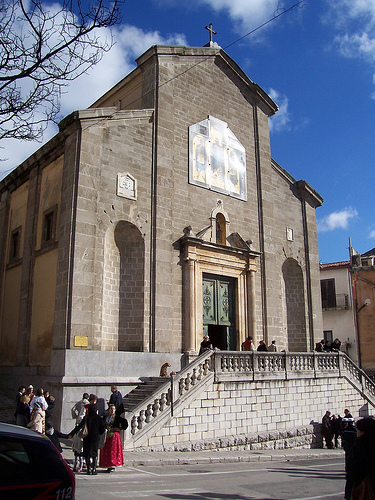
Piana degli Albanesi Cathedral of the Albanians of the insular Italy

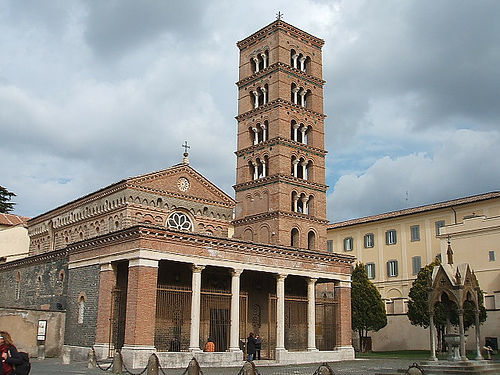
The Territorial Abbacy of Saint Mary of Grottaferrata with Basilian monks from the Italo-Albanian communities

There are three ecclesiastical jurisdictions composing the Italo-Albanian Catholic Church:

- Eparchy of Lungro degli Italo-Albanesi
- Eparchy of Piana degli Albanesi
- Territorial Abbacy of Santa Maria of Grottaferrata

The eparchies themselves have not been organized as a Metropolitan church, and remain on an equal footing, directly subject to the Holy See. These eparchies allow the ordination of married men as priests, and they also govern a few Latin Church parishes within the respective territories of the eparchies.

As of 2010, the church's membership was estimated at approximately 61,000 faithful, with two bishops, 45 parishes, 82 priests, 5 deacons, and 207 religious brothers and sisters.

In the church there are the following religious institutions: the Italo-Albanian Basilian Monks Order of Grottaferrata (present in Lazio, Calabria and Sicily), the Suore Collegine della Sacra Famiglia, and the congregation of the Italo-Albanian Basilian Sisters Figlie di Santa Macrina (present in Sicily, Calabria, Albania and Kosovo).

Italo-Albanian communities were formed in the cities of Milan, Turin, Rome, Naples, Bari, Lecce, Crotone, Cosenza and Palermo, as well as in Switzerland, Germany, the United States, Canada, Argentina and Brazil. They depend, however, on Latin dioceses and only in some cases is the Byzantine liturgy celebrated. Over the centuries, albeit limited, there have been religious contacts between Albanians of Italy with the Christian East (monasteries of Crete) and Albania (Archdiocese of Shkodër, Durrës, Himarë). Important spiritual and cultural contributions have been made by the monks and hieromonks at the Abbey of Saint Mary of Grottaferrata.

Outside of Italy, there are some diaspora communities Italo-Albanian organized in religious associations and parishes.

In the United States, some Italo-Albanian Catholic parishes fall under non-Italo-Albanian episcopal authorities. For example, the Italo-Greek Church of Our Lady of Wisdom in Las Vegas is under the jurisdiction of the Byzantine Catholic Eparchy of Phoenix, and the Greek Catholic Mission of Our Lady of Grace in New York is under the jurisdiction of the Latin Archdiocese of New York.

=== Current hierarchy of the church ===
The present Italo-Albanian Catholic episcopate (5 hierarchs as per 31 January 2026) is as follows:

- Eparchial Bishops and Apostolic Exarch
  - Donato Oliverio, Bishop of Lungro (since 2012)
  - Raffaele De Angelis, Bishop of Piana (since 2025)
  - Manuel Nin, OSB, Titular Bishop of Carcabia, Apostolic Exarch of Saint Mary of Grottaferrata (since 2026)
- Emeritus Hierarch
  - Giorgio Demetrio Gallaro, Titular Archbishop of Trecalae, Emeritus of Piana
- Serving elsewhere
  - Ignazio Ceffalia, Titular Archbishop of Fiorentino, Apostolic Nuncio of Belarus

== See also ==
- Albanian Greek Catholic Church
- Arbëreshë people
- Byzantine Rite
- Eastern Catholic Churches
- Pontifical Greek College of Saint Athanasius
