= Francesco De Angelis (musician) =

Italian violinist

Francesco De Angelis

Francesco De Angelis (born Naples) is an Italian violinist, both leader and soloist of the Orchestra del Teatro alla Scala and Filarmonica della Scala. He is internationally acclaimed as one of the major talented musician by critics and public alike. The peculiarity of his performances is an unmistakable romantic sound blended with the bel canto style and with the rigour of the middle-European instrumental tradition.

== Early years ==
He began studying violin at the age of 6 with Giovanni Leone. Aged 11 he participated in the Rassegna Giovani Violinisti Città di Vittorio Veneto, winning first prize (in 1982, and in successive years 1984 and 1985).

Following the suggestion of the soloist Jean-Jacques Kantorow, Francesco De Angelis further pursued his studies with Tibor Varga at the Académie de Musique Tibor Varga in Sion, Switzerland.

Aged nineteen, he gained the position of co-leader of Teatro alla Scala Orchestra.

In 1993, he was unanimously awarded first prize at the 21st Concorso Nazionale di Violino Città di Vittorio Veneto.

In 1995, he auditioned successfully for the position of leader at Orchestra del Teatro La Fenice in Venice.

In 1998, participating in an international competition, he was chosen by Riccardo Muti as Konzertmeister for both the Orchestra del Teatro alla Scala and Filarmonica della Scala.

== International career ==
Francesco De Angelis has collaborated with the greatest conductors including Daniel Barenboim, Gary Bertini, Semyon Bychkov, Riccardo Chailly, Myung-whun Chung, Colin Davis, Rafael Frühbeck de Burgos, Charles Dutoit, Gianandrea Gavazzeni, Valery Gergiev, Carlo Maria Giulini, Paavo Järvi, Lorin Maazel, Riccardo Muti, Georges Prêtre, Gennady Rozhdestvensky, Wolfgang Sawallisch, Georg Solti, Jeffrey Tate and Yuri Temirkanov.

Under Riccardo Muti's baton, he participated in the peace-fostering project Vie dell'Amicizia promoted by the Ravenna Festival in Sarajevo, Beirut, Jerusalem, Ground Zero in New York City (on the anniversary of the collapse of the Twin Towers 2002) and Damascus. In 2003 he was personally invited by Valery Gergiev to represent Italy in the World Orchestra for Peace in Saint Petersburg and in Moscow.

Francesco De Angelis has performed, as soloist, in concert halls such as: the Gasteig at Munich, the Bachsaal in Amsterdam, the Paris Conservatoire, Rockefeller Center and Guggenheim Museum, New York, the Reiss-Engelhorn Museum of Mannheim. He played as soloist with the Euskadi Orchestra, the Tibor Varga Chamber Orchestra, l'Orchestra di Padova e del Veneto. In the season 2005-2006 he played the Alexander Glazunov Concerto in A min Op. 82 with the Filarmonica della Scala conducted by Semyon Bychkov.

He performs also in chamber music concerts. He played with prestigious soloists such as Enrico Dindo, Massimo Quarta, Jean-Jacques Kantorow, Tibor Varga, Die Solisten des Wiener Philharmoniker.

He is professor at the Conservatoire Supérieur et Académie de Musique Tibor Varga in Sion, Switzerland and he holds Master Classes in France, Italy, Japan and Switzerland.

Francesco De Angelis plays the violin Giovanni Battista Guadagnini "Ex Kleynenberg" (Torino, 1783), lent by the Pro Canale Foundation, Milan.
