= Donato Oliverio =

Italo-Albanian Catholic bishop (born 1956)

Most Reverend Donato Oliverio
- Bishop of Eparchy of Lungro
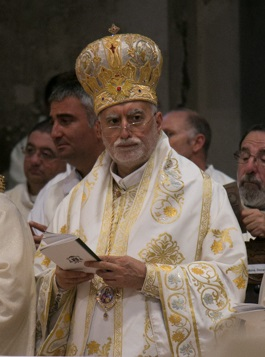
- Church: Italo-Albanian Catholic
- See: Eparchy of Lungro
- Appointed: 12 May 2012
- Installed: 1 July 2012
- Predecessor: Ercole Lupinacci

Personal details
- Born: 5 March 1956 (age 70) Cosenza, Italy
- Residence: Lungro, Cosenza, Calabria, Italy
- Occupation: Prelate

Ordination history
History
Priestly ordination
- Ordained by: Giovanni Stamati
Episcopal consecration
- Principal consecrator: Ercole Lupinacci
- Co-consecrators: Cyril Vasiľ, Salvatore Nunnari
Episcopal succession
Bishops consecrated by Donato Oliverio as principal consecrator
- Giorgio Demetrio Gallaro: 2015
- Raffaele De Angelis: 2025

Donato Oliverio (born 5 March 1956) is a prelate of the Catholic Church and the Bishop of the Eparchy of Lungro, a diocese of the Italo-Albanian Catholic Church in Calabria, Italy.

== Episcopal genealogy ==
- Archbishop Nilo Isvoroff
- Bishop Michael Petkov
- Archbishop Michael Mirov
- Eparch Isaias Papadopoulos
- Eparch Giovanni Mele
- Eparch Giovanni Stamati
- Eparch Ercole Lupinacci
- Eparch Donato Oliverio

Catholic Church titles
Preceded by Ercole Lupinacci	Bishop of Lungro; 2012–	Incumbent
