= Michelangelo Mattei =

Roman Catholic patriarch (1628–1699)

Most Reverend Michelangelo Mattei
- Titular Patriarch of Antioch
- Church: Catholic Church
- In office: 1693–1699
- Predecessor: Giacomo Altoviti
- Successor: Charles Thomas Maillard de Tournon
- Previous post: Titular Archbishop of Hadrianopolis in Haemimonto (1689–1693)

Orders
- Consecration: 13 November 1689 by Fabrizio Spada

Personal details
- Born: 8 May 1628 Rome, Italy
- Died: 22 December 1699 (age 71)

Michelangelo Mattei or Michael Angelus Matthaeius (8 May 1628 – 22 December 1699) was a Roman Catholic prelate who served as Titular Patriarch of Antioch (1693–1699) and Titular Archbishop of Hadrianopolis in Haemimonto (1689–1693).

== Biography ==
Michelangelo Mattei was born in Rome, Italy on 8 May 1628. On 7 November 1689, he was appointed during the papacy of Pope Alexander VIII as Titular Archbishop of Hadrianopolis in Haemimonto. On 13 November 1689, he was consecrated bishop by Fabrizio Spada, Cardinal-Priest of San Crisogono with Francesco de' Marini, Titular Archbishop of Teodosia, and Prospero Bottini, Titular Archbishop of Myra, serving as co-consecrators. On 18 May 1693, he was appointed during the papacy of Pope Innocent XII as Titular Patriarch of Antioch. He served as Titular Patriarch of Antioch until his death on 22 December 1699.

== Episcopal succession ==
Episcopal succession of Michelangelo Mattei

While bishop, he was the principal consecrator of:

- Benedetto Luperti, Bishop of Cagli (1694);

and the principal co-consecrator of:

- Baldassare Cenci (seniore), Titular Archbishop of Larissa in Thessalia (1691);
- Giovanni Giacomo Cavallerini, Titular Archbishop of Nicaea (1692);
- Alessandro Lambert, Bishop of Aosta (1692);
- Gerolamo Ubertino Provana, Bishop of Alba Pompea (1692);
- Pierre Lambert Ledrou, Titular Bishop of Porphyreon (1692);
- Paolo Vallaresso, Bishop of Concordia (1693);
- Andreas Riggio, Bishop of Catania (1693);
- Michelangelo Veraldi, Bishop of Martirano (1693);
- Nicolò Acciaioli, Cardinal-Bishop of Frascati (1693);
- Eligio Caracciolo, Archbishop of Cosenza (1694);
- Francesco Azzolini, Bishop of Ripatransone (1694);
- Luigi Capuani, Bishop of Ravello e Scala (1694);
- Giuseppe Cei (bishop), Bishop of Cortona (1695); and
- Domenico Tarugi, Bishop of Ferrara (1696).

== External links and additional sources ==
- Cheney, David M. "Hadrianopolis in Haemimonto (Titular See)". Catholic-Hierarchy.org. (for Chronology of Bishops) ^{[self-published]}
- Chow, Gabriel. "Titular Metropolitan See of Hadrianopolis in Hæmimonto (Turkey)". GCatholic.org. (for Chronology of Bishops) ^{[self-published]}
- Cheney, David M. "Antiochia {Antioch} (Titular See)". Catholic-Hierarchy.org. (for Chronology of Bishops) ^{[self-published]}
- Chow, Gabriel. "Titular Patriarchal See of Antioch (Syria)". GCatholic.org. (for Chronology of Bishops) ^{[self-published]}

Catholic Church titles
Preceded by Pompeo Varese	Titular Archbishop of Hadrianopolis in Haemimonto; 1689–1693	Succeeded by Johann Peter von Quentell
Preceded by Giacomo Altoviti	Titular Patriarch of Antioch; 1693–1699	Succeeded by Charles Thomas Maillard de Tournon
