= Ottaviano Carafa =

Most Reverend Ottaviano Carafa
- Titular Archbishop of Patrae
- Church: Catholic Church
- In office: 1660–1666
- Predecessor: Girolamo Farnese
- Successor: Giacinto Solaro di Moretta

Orders
- Consecration: 25 April 1660 by Giulio Cesare Sacchetti

Personal details
- Died: 14 April 1666

Ottaviano Carafa (died 14 April 1666) was a Roman Catholic prelate who served as Titular Archbishop of Patrae (1660–1666).

== Biography ==
On 19 April 1660, Ottaviano Carafa was appointed during the papacy of Pope Alexander VII as Titular Archbishop of Patrae. On 25 April 1660, he was consecrated bishop by Giulio Cesare Sacchetti, Cardinal-Bishop of Sabina. He served as Titular Archbishop of Patrae until his death on 14 April 1666.

== Episcopal succession ==
While bishop, he was the principal co-consecrator of:

- Vincenzo Lanfranchi, Bishop of Trivento (1660)
- Odoardo Vecchiarelli, Bishop of Rieti (1660)
- Francesco Cini, Bishop of Macerata e Tolentino (1660)
- Ferdinand von Furstenberg, Bishop of Paderborn (1661)
- Gennaro Sanfelice, Archbishop of Cosenza (1661)
- Esuperanzio Raffaelli, Bishop of Penne e Atri (1661)
- Felice Antonio Monaco, Bishop of Martirano (1661)
- Tommaso de Rosa, Bishop of Sant'Angelo dei Lombardi e Bisaccia (1662)
- Paolo Carafa, Bishop of Aversa (1665)
- Stefano Ugolini, Titular Archbishop of Corinthus (1666)

== See also ==
- Catholic Church in Italy

Catholic Church titles
Preceded by Girolamo Farnese	Titular Archbishop of Patrae; 1660–1666	Succeeded by Giacinto Solaro di Moretta
