= Sanfelice =

Sanfelice is a surname. Notable people with the surname include:

- Ferdinando Sanfelice (1675–1748), Italian architect and painter
- Gennaro Sanfelice (1622–1694), Italian Roman Catholic prelate
- Giovanni Sanfelice, Italian Roman Catholic prelate
- Giuseppe Sanfelice (1615–1660), Italian Roman Catholic prelate
- Luisa Sanfelice (1764–1800), Italian aristocrat

== See also ==
- House of Sanfelice
