= Francesco Argentino =

Italian clergyman

Francesco Argentino (c. 1450 – 23 August 1511) was an Italian Roman Catholic bishop and cardinal.

== Biography ==
Francesco Argentino was born in Venice c. 1450. His father was a poor man from Strasbourg (he took the surname "Argentino" because in Latin, "Strasbourg" is Argentinensis) and a Venetian woman. Giovanni Mocenigo, Doge of Venice, arranged for Argentino to study at the University of Padua, where the young man obtained a doctorate in law.

After completing his degree, he returned to Venice to practice law. Cardinal Giovanni di Lorenzo de' Medici (the future Pope Leo X) was exiled in Venice at that time, allowing Argentino to meet him. Thanks to the cardinal, he obtained a canonicate in the collegiate Chapter of St Mark's Basilica. In 1494, he became the pastor of Salzano.

He then traveled to Rome, where he gained the confidence of Cardinal Giuliano della Rovere (the future Pope Julius II). On 24 August 1506, he was elected Bishop of Concordia; he occupied that see until his death. When he became pope, Julius II made Bishop Argentino his Datary.

Pope Julius II made him a cardinal priest in the consistory of 10 March 1511. He received the red hat on 13 March 1511, and the titular church of the Basilica di San Clemente on 17 March 1511.

He died in Rome on 23 August 1511. He was buried in Concordia Cathedral.

== See also ==
- Catholic Church in Italy
