= Nole =

Nole may refer to:

== People ==
- Andreas de Nole (1598–1638), Flemish sculptor
- Francescantonio Nolè (1948–2022), Italian archbishop
- Raffaele Nolè (born 1984), Italian footballer
- Rene Nole, a member of the 1960s vocal group The Forum
- Nole, a nickname of Novak Djokovic (born 1987), Serbian tennis player
- Nole, early nickname of Novica Zdravković (1947–2021), Serbian folk singer
- Nole Nokie Edwards (1935–2018), American guitarist best known for his work with The Ventures
- Nolé Marin (born 1969), American former owner/director of AIM Model Management and reality show judge

== Other uses ==
- Nole, Piedmont, Italy, a comune (municipality)
- Nole, capital city of Noland in L. Frank Baum's Oz novels
