= Francesco Monaco =

Francesco Monaco may refer to:

- Francesco Monaco (died 1626), Italian Roman Catholic bishop
- Francesco Monaco (born 1898), Italian Roman Catholic bishop
- Francesco Monaco (footballer), Italian footballer
