= Paolo Vallaresso =

Former Roman Catholic Bishop of Concordia (1693-1723)

Most Reverend Paolo Vallaresso
- Bishop of Concordia
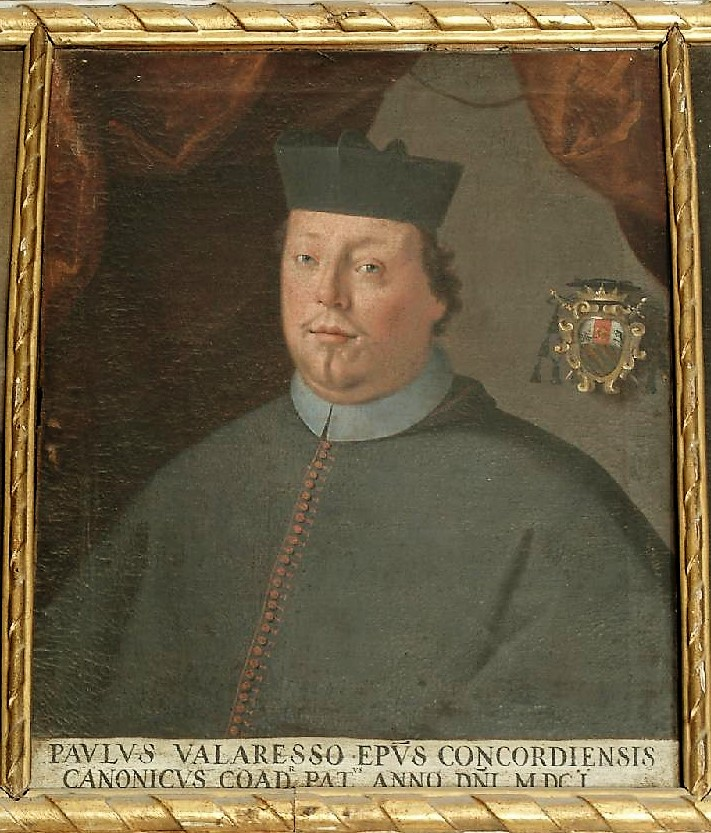
- Paolo Vallaresso
- Church: Catholic Church
- Diocese: Diocese of Concordia
- In office: 1693–1723
- Predecessor: Agostino Premoli
- Successor: Jacopo Maria Erizzo

Orders
- Ordination: 23 November 1692
- Consecration: 15 March 1693 by Gasparo Carpegna

Personal details
- Born: 5 March 1660 Venice, Italy
- Died: 23 November 1723 (age 63) Concordia, Italy

Paolo Vallaresso (5 March 1660 – 23 November 1723) was a Roman Catholic prelate who served as Bishop of Concordia (1693–1723).

== Biography ==
Paolo Vallaresso was born in Venice, Italy on 5 March 1660. He was ordained a deacon on 21 April 1685 and ordained a priest on 23 November 1692. He held the degree of Doctor in utroque iure from the University of Padua.

On 9 March 1693, he was appointed Bishop of Concordia by Pope Innocent XII. On 15 March 1693, he was consecrated bishop by Gasparo Carpegna, Cardinal-Priest of Santa Maria in Trastevere, with Petrus Draghi Bartoli, Titular Patriarch of Alexandria, and Michelangelo Mattei, Titular Archbishop of Hadrianopolis in Haemimonto, serving as co-consecrators. He served as Bishop of Concordia until his death on 23 November 1723.

== External links and additional sources ==
- Cheney, David M. "Diocese of Concordia-Pordenone". Catholic-Hierarchy.org. (for Chronology of Bishops) ^{[self-published]}
- Chow, Gabriel. "Diocese of Concordia–Pordenone (Italy)". GCatholic.org. (for Chronology of Bishops) ^{[self-published]}

Catholic Church titles
Preceded by Agostino Premoli	Bishop of Concordia; 1693–1723	Succeeded by Jacopo Maria Erizzo
