= Giovanni Battista Costanzo =

Italian Roman Catholic prelate (died 1617)

Most Reverend Giovanni Battista Costanzo
- Archbishop of Cosenza
- Church: Catholic Church
- Archdiocese: Archdiocese of Cosenza
- In office: 1591–1617
- Predecessor: Giovanni Evangelista Pallotta
- Successor: Paolo Emilio Santori

Orders
- Consecration: 21 April 1591 by Giulio Antonio Santorio

Personal details
- Died: 1617 Cosenza, Italy

Giovanni Battista Costanzo (died 1617) was a Roman Catholic prelate who served as Archbishop of Cosenza (1591–1617).

== Biography ==
On 5 April 1591, Giovanni Battista Costanzo was appointed during the papacy of Pope Gregory XIV as Archbishop of Cosenza. On 21 April 1591, he was consecrated bishop by Giulio Antonio Santorio, Cardinal-Priest of San Bartolomeo all'Isola, with Leonard Abel, Titular Bishop of Sidon and Giovanni Battista Santorio, Bishop of Tricarico serving as co-consecrators. He served as Archbishop of Cosenza until his death in 1617. While bishop, he was the principal consecrator of Francesco Monaco, Bishop of Martirano (1592); and Decio Caracciolo Rosso, Archbishop of Bari (1606).

Catholic Church titles
| Preceded by Giovanni Evangelista Pallotta | Archbishop of Cosenza; 1591–1617 | Succeeded by Paolo Emilio Santori |
