= Felice Antonio Monaco =

Italian prelate (1611-1667)

Most Reverend Felice Antonio Monaco
- Bishop of Martirano
- Church: Catholic Church
- Diocese: Diocese of Martirano
- In office: 1661–1667
- Predecessor: Luca Cellesi
- Successor: Giovanni Giacomo Palamolla

Orders
- Consecration: 30 November 1661 by Giulio Cesare Sacchetti

Personal details
- Born: 1611 Cosenza, Italy
- Died: January 1667 (age 56) Martirano, Italy

Felice Antonio Monaco (1611 – January 1667) was a Roman Catholic prelate who served as Bishop of Martirano (1661–1667).

== Biography ==
Felice Antonio Monaco was born in Cosenza, Italy in 1611. On 21 November 1661, he was appointed during the papacy of Pope Gregory XIII as Bishop of Martirano. On 30 November 1661, he was consecrated bishop by Giulio Cesare Sacchetti, Cardinal-Bishop of Sabina, with Ottaviano Carafa, Titular Archbishop of Patrae, and Emilio Bonaventura Altieri, Bishop of Camerino, serving as co-consecrators. He served as Bishop of Martirano until his death in January 1667.

== External links and additional sources ==
- Cheney, David M. "Diocese of Martirano (Martoranum)". Catholic-Hierarchy.org. (for Chronology of Bishops) ^{[self-published]}
- Chow, Gabriel. "Titular Episcopal See of Martirano (Italy)". GCatholic.org. (for Chronology of Bishops) ^{[self-published]}

Catholic Church titles
Preceded by Luca Cellesi	Bishop of Martirano; 1661–1667	Succeeded by Giovanni Giacomo Palamolla
