= Francesco Monaco (died 1626) =

Italian Roman Catholic prelate (died 1626)

Most Reverend Bishop of Martirano
- Francesco Monaco
- Church: Catholic Church
- Diocese: Diocese of Martirano
- In office: 1591–1626
- Predecessor: Roberto Pierbenedetti
- Successor: Luca Cellesi

Orders
- Consecration: 4 April 1592 by Giovanni Battista Costanzo

Personal details
- Died: December 1626 Martirano, Italy

Francesco Monaco (died December 1626) was a Roman Catholic prelate who served as Bishop of Martirano (1591–1626).

== Biography ==
On 1 July 1591, Francesco Monaco was appointed during the papacy of Pope Gregory XIV as Bishop of Martirano. On 4 April 1592, he was consecrated bishop by Giovanni Battista Costanzo, Archbishop of Cosenza, with Clemente Bontodasio, Bishop of Nicastro, and Orazio Schipano, Bishop of Belcastro, serving as co-consecrators. He served as Bishop of Martirano until his death in December 1626.

== External links and additional sources ==
- Cheney, David M. "Diocese of Martirano (Martoranum)". Catholic-Hierarchy.org. (for Chronology of Bishops) ^{[self-published]}
- Chow, Gabriel. "Titular Episcopal See of Martirano (Italy)". GCatholic.org. (for Chronology of Bishops) ^{[self-published]}

Catholic Church titles
Preceded by Roberto Pierbenedetti	Bishop of Martirano; 1591–1626	Succeeded by Luca Cellesi
