= Michelangelo Veraldi =

18th-century Roman Catholic bishop

Most Reverend Michelangelo Veraldi
- Bishop of Martirano
- Church: Catholic Church
- Diocese: Diocese of Martirano
- In office: 1693–1702
- Predecessor: Giovan Giacomo Palemonio
- Successor: Nicolaus Righetti

Orders
- Consecration: 15 Mar 1693 by Gasparo Carpegna

Personal details
- Born: 29 Sep 1650 Taverna, Calabria, Italy
- Died: Nov 1702 (age 52)

Michelangelo Veraldi (1650–1702) was a Roman Catholic prelate who served as Bishop of Martirano (1693–1702).

== Biography ==
Michelangelo Veraldi was born on 29 Sep 1650 in Taverna, Calabria. On 9 Mar 1693, he was appointed during the papacy of Pope Innocent XII as Bishop of Martirano. On 15 Mar 1693, he was consecrated bishop by Gasparo Carpegna, Cardinal-Priest of Santa Maria in Trastevere, with Petrus Draghi Bartoli, Titular Patriarch of Alexandria, and Michelangelo Mattei, Titular Archbishop of Hadrianopolis in Haemimonto, serving as co-consecrators. He served as Bishop of Martirano until his death in Nov 1702.

== External links and additional sources ==
- Cheney, David M. "Diocese of Martirano (Martoranum)". Catholic-Hierarchy.org. (for Chronology of Bishops) ^{[self-published]}
- Chow, Gabriel. "Titular Episcopal See of Martirano (Italy)". GCatholic.org. (for Chronology of Bishops) ^{[self-published]}

Catholic Church titles
Preceded by Giovan Giacomo Palemonio	Bishop of Martirano; 1693–1702	Succeeded by Nicolaus Righetti
