= Salvatore Nunnari =

Archbishop Emeritus of Cosenza-Bisignano

- Archbishop of Cosenza-Bisignano
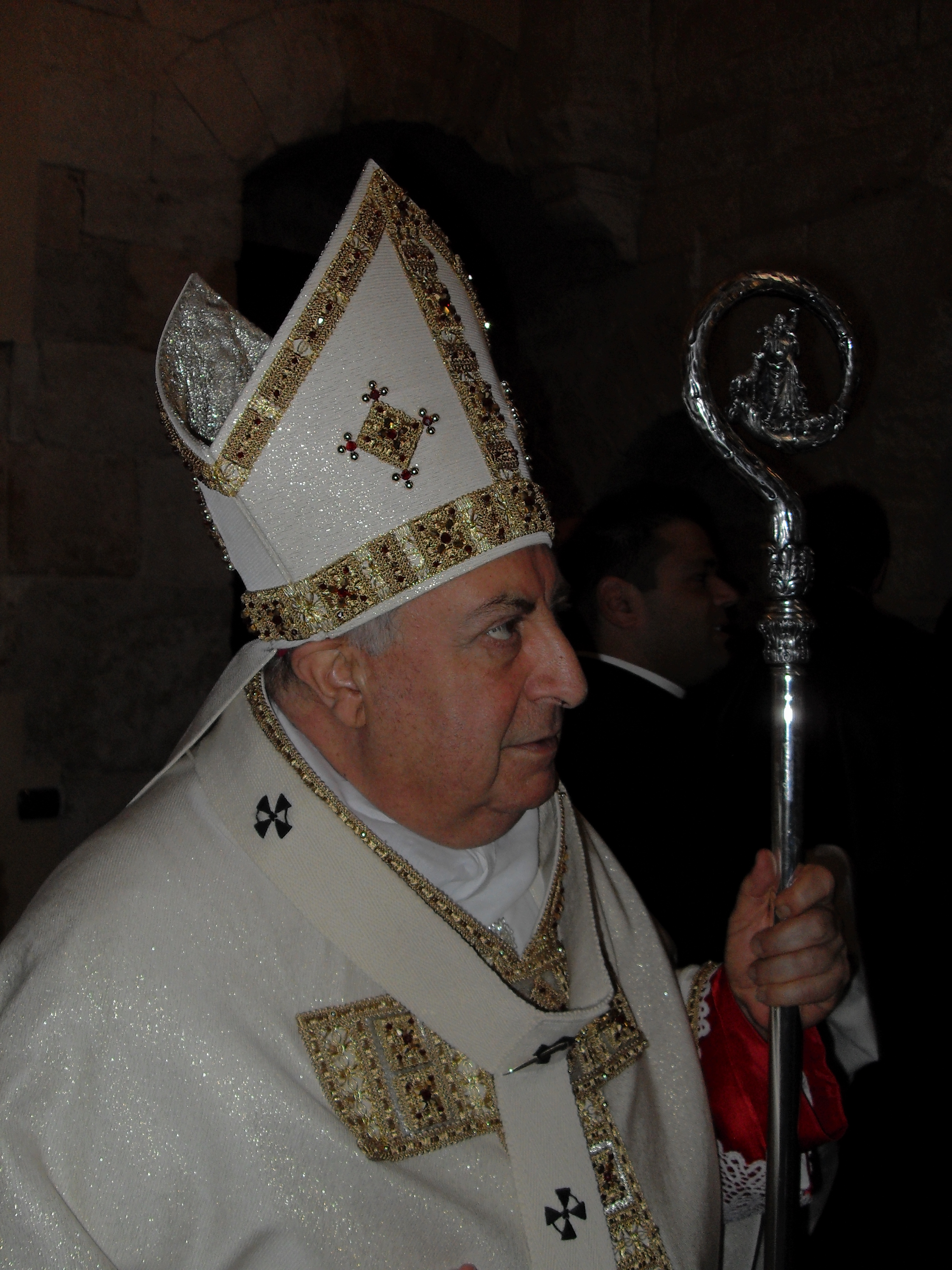
- Church: Roman Catholic Church
- Archdiocese: Cosenza-Bisignano
- In office: 2004-2015
- Predecessor: Giuseppe Agostino
- Other post: Apostolic Administrator of the Eparchy of Lungro
- Previous post: Archbishop of Sant’Angelo dei Lombardi-Conza-Nusco-Bisaccia (1999-2004)

Orders
- Ordination: 12 July 1964
- Consecration: 20 March 1999 by Vittorio Luigi Mondello

Personal details
- Born: 11 June 1939 (age 86) Reggio

Salvatore Nunnari (born 11 June 1939, in Reggio Calabria) is the Archbishop Emeritus of Cosenza-Bisignano.

== Biography ==
Nunnari was born 11 June 1939 in Reggio, Reggio Calabria, Calabria, Italy. He was ordained priest on 12 July 1964. He was appointed Archbishop on 30 January 1999 to the Archdiocese of Sant’Angelo dei Lombardi-Conza-Nusco-Bisaccia. He thus received his episcopal consecration on 20 March 1999 from Archbishop Luigi Vittorio Mondello. He was appointed Metropolitan Archbishop of Cosenza-Bisignano on 18 December 2004 replacing Giuseppe Agostino.

With the retirement of Bishop Ercole Lupinacci, he was appointed as Apostolic Administrator for the Eparchy of Lungro of the Italo-Albanian Catholic Church on 10 August 2010.

He took retirement on 15 March 2015.

Catholic Church titles
Preceded by Giuseppe Agostino	Archbishop of Cosenza Bisignano; 2004 - 2015	Succeeded by Francescantonio Nolè
Preceded by Mario Milano	Archbishop of Sant'Angelo dei Lombardi-Conza-Nusco-Bisaccia	Succeeded by Francesco Alfano
Preceded by Ercole Lupinacci	Apostolic Administrator of Lungro; 2010 - 2012	Succeeded by Donato Olivero
