= Lungro =

- Comune
- Comune di Lungro; Bashkia e Ungrës
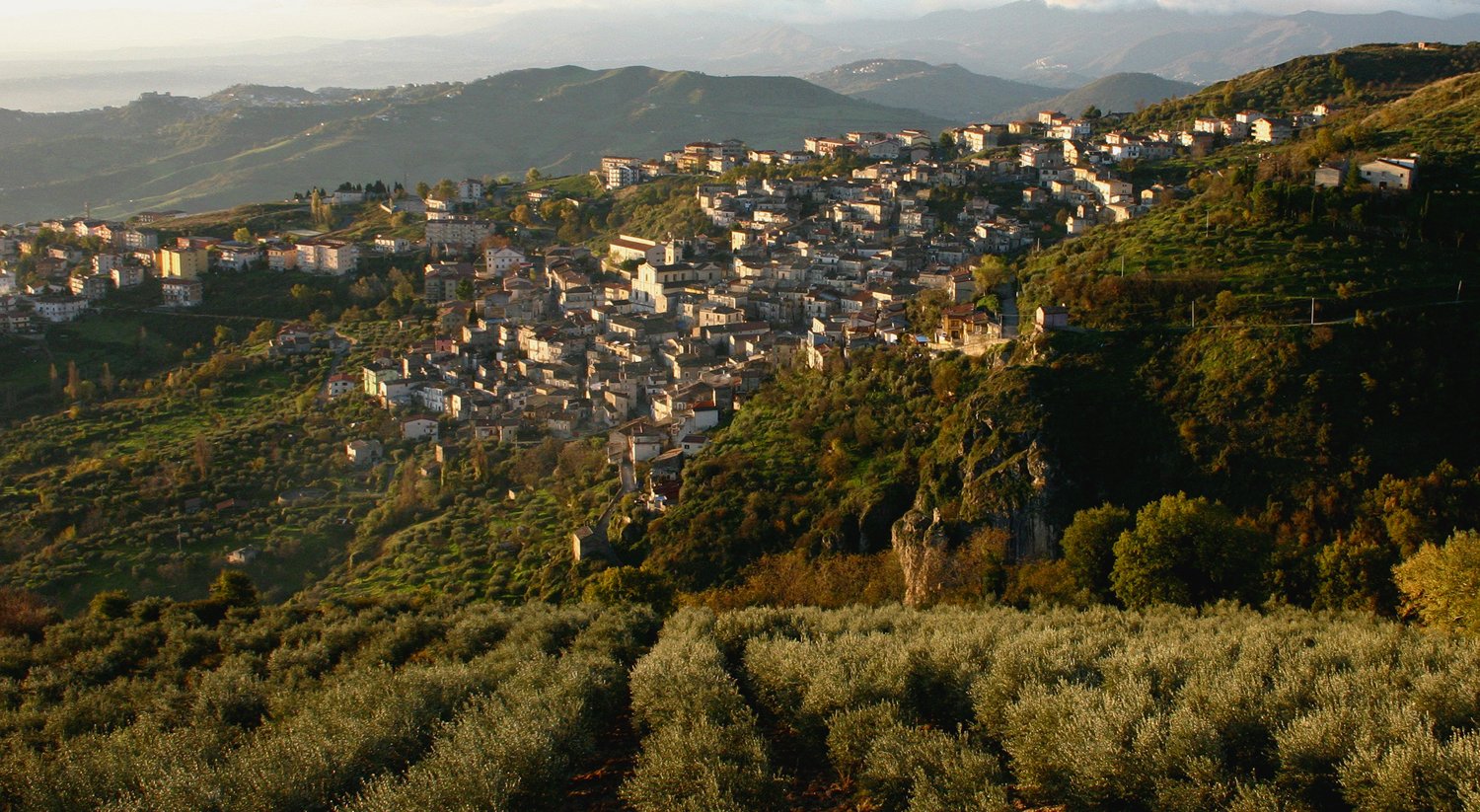

- Location within Italy Location within Calabria
- Coordinates: 39°45′N 16°7′E
- Country: Italy
- Region: Calabria
- Province: Cosenza (CS)

Government
  - Mayor: Carmine Ferraro

Area
  - Total: 36 km^{2} (14 sq mi)
- Elevation: 650 m (2,130 ft)

Population (2017)
  - Total: 2,508
  - Density: 70/km^{2} (180/sq mi)
- Demonym: Lungresi
- Time zone: UTC+1 (CET)
  - Summer (DST): UTC+2 (CEST)
- Postal code: 87010
- Dialing code: 0981
- Patron saint: Saint Nicholas
- Saint day: 6 December
- Website: Official website

Lungro (Arbëreshë Albanian: Ungra) is a town and comune (municipality) in the Province of Cosenza in the Calabria region of Italy.

Lungro is one of the most prominent centers of the Arbëreshë people and the seat of the Eparchy of Lungro. This jurisdiction of the Catholic Church preserved the Byzantine rite and the local language, and encompasses all the Arbëreshë-speaking communities in the area. The eparchy is part of the Italo-Albanian Catholic Church. Lungro is also part of the largest nature reserve in Italy, the Pollino National Park.

== Geography ==
The town is situated 67 km north of Cosenza at the foot of Mount Petrosa at 650 meters above sea level on the Campolongo plateau, flanked by the rivers Galatro and Tiro. It is bordered to the east by the municipality of Saracena, to the south by Firmo and Altomonte, and to the northwest by Acquaformosa. The landscape is mostly mountainous towards the north, with beech and chestnut groves, while vineyards and fields are in the southern part.

== History ==
Lungro was founded in the second half of the 15th century CE by ethnic Albanian settlers, and developed around a Basilian monastery on lands that had been granted in 1156 from feudal landowner Ogerio del Vasto Altomonte. The Albanians who migrated were housed in the area around 1486. They were welcomed by Abbot Paul with the approval of Prince of Bisignano, Geronimo Sanseverino, when Albanian resistance led and organized by George Castriot or Skanderbeg against the Ottoman conquest dissipated shortly thereafter his death in 1468.

Following these events the most significant migration of Albanians was recorded in Italy and led to the foundation of Lungro.

In 1525, the Basilian monastery was abandoned, after helping the fugitives through a period of deep crisis. It became available to the Commandery Pontiff and the inhabitants of Lungro were able to resist all attempts by the feudal lords to control civil jurisdiction and policy. In the second half of the 17th century and the 18th century, fighting intensified between the baronial families of Sanseverino Altomonte and Pescara Saracen. Many political clashes occurred over the acquisition of certain rights of barons' fiefs.

Over the years, age-old religious conflicts intensified between the Byzantine rite Albanians and the Latin rite of the neighboring populations. Many priests were imprisoned Albanians from the practice of the Eastern rite, but Lungresi gathered around them and fought to maintain their religious identity.

From 1768, Albanians of Lungro tenaciously undertook the defense of its Greek-Byzantine liturgical rite, because, coming from Southern Albania, they were under the jurisdiction of the Patriarch of Constantinople. For centuries, thanks to the work of the Byzantine Church, they retained their own rite.

In February 1897, Girolamo de Rada, Giuseppe Schirò and Anselmo Lorecchio from the Arbëreshë community organised a congress on the Albanian question that convened in Lungro. The resolution of the Lungro congress called for a unified Albanian alphabet and an Albanian dictionary, the founding of an Albanian national society and the need for the Arbëreshë to have relations with the Albanian mother country.

L 'Eparchy of Lungro is the fundamental point of reference for the Italo-Albanian mainland, and continues to cherish the traditional religious, linguistic and cultural identity Arbëreshë. The eparchy was created on February 13 of 1919 by Pope Benedict XV and the first Eparch was John Apples, succeeded by John Stamati and Ercole Lupinacci.

== Etymology ==
The name "Lungru" appears for the first time in history around the 12th century. The etymology of "Lungrum" or "Ugrium" seems to refer to the specific humidity of its territory. According to Domenico De Marchis, its name derived from the Greek Ugros (wet, fluid, water). This hypothesis is supported also by the name of the ancient monastery of the hamlet of Lungro, was rapidly gaining prestige and soon became one of the most important spiritual centers of Byzantine and Greek culture.

== Places of interest ==
The traditional architecture of Albania is mostly circular in shape. Most buildings in Lungro were built around a square with a circular facade. All openings were to the main square. Each cluster of houses was a district whose name was derived from elements in the area: Kastieli (a castle), Bregu (coast of the hill slope), Konxa (Icon - presence of the Church of Santa Maria of Constantinople with the icon of the Madonna. The church has a square shape, reflecting the canons of the Byzantine rite, the first built by the Albanians), Shin LLiri (Church of St. Elijah), Kriqi (crucifix), Abbots (at one time, the Abbey of St. Mary).

The village centers around two central squares along a path crossing that connects to the outside. It is located in the slope, filling a compact but irregular shape. It is characterized by buildings of popular roots, in urban and rural areas, including housing units and small chapels. Among the narrow streets of the historic district, architectural types are distinguished by gjitonia (neighborhoods and doors of medieval and ancient palaces). The gjitonia is a sector of the district, forming a social group with its own rules.

The area retains architectural, religious and civil structures, as well as small industrial facilities. These remnants reflect symbolic "protection" in the region, particularly of shrines like those of St. Leonard and St. Elias on the streets of the same name. To commemorate the mines of rock salt, a monument-stage course of Skanderbeg (representing miners at work) has been established, next to the town house. A museum of the salt mine was created that is complete with costumes, tools, artifacts and writings of the time. In Lungro, as in most Arbëreshë settlements, the main square displays a bust of Skanderbeg, to honor their ethnic and linguistic origins.

=== Religious architecture ===
==== Cathedral of St. Nicholas of Myra ====
The Cathedral of St. Nicholas of Myra (Qisha and Shën Kollit, 18th century), is the principal church of the Eparchy of Lungro. The building was built in 1721, after the late 17th century earthquake destroyed its predecessor. The cathedral is large relative to local churches. It is in the Romanesque-Baroque style, with three aisles, a large Apse and Dome center.

Mosaics, icons and Byzantine paintings, reflected the beauty of Eastern Christian sacred structures. The sanctuary is separated from the rest of the Church 'Iconostasis, the first made in a church after the establishment of the eparchy. In 1825 the structure of the church was complete, although it was not possible to fix a precise date of completion of the art installation. The mosaic works decorative elements of the nave and aisles of the Temple. Since 1921, after the erection of the Eparchy of Lungro in 1919 by Pope Benedict XV, the Church of St. Nicholas of Myra, elevated to a cathedral, undergoes profound changes, to be adapted to the needs of the Byzantine rite-Greek. The Romanesque-Baroque Church, while not altering the walls and the original design of the sacred building, lends itself, with its wide open spaces, to be aligned with the philosophy and liturgical needs of the Church of 'East. The cathedral is full of Mosaics. The mosaic of Pantocrator covers the entire surface of the 120 m² central dome, which is internal and does not leak from the roof and has a height of 18 meters.

Also important is the vast mosaic of the apse, surmounted by a mosaic of Platitera and surrounded by figures of the archangels Gabriel and Michael, from King David and the prophet Isaiah, and the mosaic of the Chapel of the baptismal font, designed by painter and mosaic artist Albanian Joseph Droboniku, who executed the great mosaic of Christ Pantocrator with the central dome. He also did the mosaic of Judgement, overlooking the central nave.

In the vestry is a valuable record of ancient medieval Byzantine church of Santa Maria delle Fonti, consisting of a fragment of fresco, which depicts St. Paraskeva (12th century), together with valuable paintings of the Neapolitan school and wooden statues of exquisite workmanship. The aisles of the Temple, already painted by K. Tsitlavidis Macedonian painter, were recently enriched with paintings of Greek artists Charalambos and Gregory of Thessaloniki, which respect the canons of the Byzantine traditional color. Placed on the left aisle, the six canvases depicting the life of St. Nicholas of Myra, the patron of Lungro. The works of the south aisle represent the life of Jesus Christ. Of great artistic workmanship are the three bronze doors with reliefs made using the lost wax sculptor Calabrian Talarico representing Gospel scenes. The windows of the Temple and the two aisles depict prophets.

==== Church of Santa Maria Icon ====
Church of Santa Maria Icon (Qisha and Shën MERIS and Konxis, 16th century) is located on a cliff near the river Tyre. In the 16th century the river was the border between Lungro and Saracen. It was the first church built in honor of Our Lady of Albanians Odigitria, much venerated in the East. Inside sits the first evidence of Byzantine iconography of stone that represents the Madonna and Child. The coffered wooden ceiling was built in 1663 by Angelo The Calabrian artist Petra. The poster, stolen recently, framed the precious icon. Its building is located on the northeast border of the medieval village.

The Albanians settled in the highest part of the village (Bregu ka) and built their houses near the village. The village began at the monastery of Santa Maria delle Fonti southwest and ended with the church of Santa Maria.

==== St. Elias ====
The church of St. Elias (Qisha and Shën Llirit, end of 17th century), rises to a point that probably served as a lookout post for the inhabitants of the surrounding hamlet. The church is dedicated to St. Elias the prophet, is located on a picturesque cliff gorge over the river starting from Tyre. It rises dramatically above the church of Santa Maria Icon. On the south side is the cave of St. Elias, a deep inlet between the stones. During the Renaissance the cult of the Saint was very popular since St. Elias was considered the liberator of the Albanian people of Lungro from Bourbon repression. Some verses survive in Albaniania are sung by the faithful in the Saint's procession. They were written by poet Vincent Stratigo in 1852. Thereafter, the Bourbon government forbade the procession because of their revolutionary significance.

=== Civil architectures ===
- Palazzo De Marchis
- Palace Stratigo
- Palace Kabregu
- Palace Damis
- Palace Belluscio
- Palace Cucci

=== Archaeological sites ===
- The ruins of a medieval castle in the upper part of the country
- Ancient salt mines, industrial archeology

== Greek-Byzantine rite ==
The first Eparchy by Greek Byzantine Rite of Italy connects the churches of the Arbëreshë and those of Constantinople. Established in 1919 at the behest of Pope Benedict XV's Eparchy of Lungro, the churches under its jurisdiction were from the province of Cosenza and beyond. The Mass and all the religious celebrations are performed in Greek, Albanian and, on rare occasions, Italian.

Many difficulties had to be overcome in preserving religious identity given the constant attacks by the dominant culture. The Byzantine Rite follows the canon law of Orthodox, its own liturgical calendar and uses Oriental ceremonies. The Mass is that of Saint John Chrysostom, which is celebrated in the Greek language in solemn ceremonies and in the Albanian language in daily functions. The peculiarities of the Eastern rite are evident in sacred vestments, the veneration of holy icons as well as the Church's architecture.

In the Byzantine Rite, Baptism (Pagëzim), Confirmation (Vërtetim), and first Eucharist (Kungjimi) are administered (even for babies). The Holy Week (Java and Madhe) starts on the eve of Palm Sunday and ends on the eve of Easter Sunday (Pashkët). It is among the most important and evocative Byzantine liturgical calendar holidays.

== Institutions, organizations and associations ==
- Cultural and Musical Association Arbëreshe Rilindja
- Association band (Banda Musicale) Pauline Moscogiuri
- Research Group and recovered traditional musical arbëreshe It seems the Moti
- Albanian folk group Bukurit
- Musical Association choir Paradosis
- Environmental Association Vitambiente
- Polyphonic Choir Byzantine Greek St. Nicholas of Myra
- Theatre Company Kusìa Hares
- Association of culture and music Workshop of music
- Center for Calabria Historical Studies Humanities and Social Sciences
- Cultural Centre Italo-Albanian Byzantine Studies and St. Mary of the Springs
- WWF Associazone Pollino H24
- Association of Civil Defence Pollino H24
- Wildlife-Hunting Company "Ungra"

== Dress ==
The traditional women's costumes (stolit) arbëreshe of Lungro are still worn by both young and old. One type of women's costumes is for parties and the other for daily activities. Party clothes consist of teo petticoats (sutanina), a pleated skirt with red satin (kamizola) with the edges of twisted gold wire (galuni), a pleated satin skirt. A blue shell is collected and supported on the arm (COFA), a lacy white blouse (linja), a short blue waistcoat is embroidered in gold (xhipuni), hair parted in the middle, braided with ribbons and gathered behind in kesa. Married women (bread) wear a red shawl. Daily dress consists of a red pleated skirt edged with green, white shirt, an apron (vandizini), a black vest with white embroidery.

For special events and religious festivals Albanian men sport white pants (brekët të bardha) with red or blue side stripes and embroidered in yellow shirt (kemish) white, black embroidered vest and hat (këleshi) white wool in the shape of a truncated cone.

== Cuisine ==
The food (të ngrënit') highlights its Mediterranean influence. Pasta is served in all its forms: macaroni (rrashkatjelt), gnocchi (strangulrat), lasagne (tumac), noodles (fidhilt), bucatini (hullonjrat), served with simple sauces of fresh tomato and basil, or with sauces made from pork or lamb.

Among the specialties is Shtridhëlat fasule me, a hand-made pasta finely seasoned with a tomato sauce and beans. It is a typical dish of Albanian origin. The cheese is processed by hand and its texture approaches that of the noodles. Another typical dish is Dromsat, made of flour and water, seasoned with fresh tomato sauce and peppers. Among the main courses, mushrooms are prized for their abundance in the mountains. Other dishes include mushrooms with peppers (këpurdhë kangariqra me) and mushrooms and potatoes (këpurdhë pataka me). Stews include dry sausage and peppers (I saucicë stufatjel) and pork chops and peppers (stufatjel brinjaz derku me). Pig offal (drudhezit), boiled meat (cingaridhet), gelatin (puftea) and salami Lungro with its characteristic aroma of fennel are popular.

The cheese, produced from the high altitude pastures, is rich in herbs.

Robust local wines of the vineyard of Galzei (Gauxet), or fine wines from DOC Pollino include sweet varieties such as kulaçi. Wedding cakes are made of honey. The sweet Christmas grispellet is called xhuxhullet, kanarikulit bukunotet. Sweets for Easter are nusezat, biscuits with flour (viscote të pirvëluarë), oil and aniseed. The fruit seccha is eaten with Lungro figs (fiqë të bardha and kriqezit).

== Economy ==
=== Salt ===
A large salt mine operates near Lungro. The salt was found in Roman times. It bought great wealth, and gained Lungro a mention in the writings of Pliny. Later the salt was sold across Calabria and, more recently, across Europe. It gave work to many local people and drew in outsiders. Each worker started and ended his shift by walking down or up 2,000 steps to the mine. Saint Leonardo was adopted as the Patron Saint of the salt mines, and a small church was dedicated to him. The church sank into the ground due to hydrological challenges.

The mine was abandoned in 1976. In 2010, it was commemorated by a museum.

== See also ==
- Italo-Albanese Eparchy of Lungro
- Albania
- Arbëreshë
- Parco nazionale del Pollino
- Gjergj Kastrioti Skënderbeu
