= Andrea Brancaccio =

Italian prelate

Most Reverend Andrea Brancaccio
- Archbishop of Cosenza
- Church: Catholic Church
- Diocese: Diocese of Conversano
- In office: 1701–1725
- Predecessor: Eligio Caracciolo
- Successor: Vincenzo Maria d'Aragona

Orders
- Consecration: 26 January 1681 by Alessandro Crescenzi (cardinal)

Personal details
- Born: 1644 Naples, Italy
- Died: 4 June 1725 (age 57) Cosenza, Italy

Andrea Brancaccio, C.R. (1644 – 4 June 1725) was a Roman Catholic prelate who served as Archbishop of Cosenza (1701–1725) and Bishop of Conversano (1681–1701).

== Biography ==
Andrea Brancaccio was born in Naples, Italy in 1644 and ordained a priest in the Congregation of Clerics Regular of the Divine Providence. On 13 January 1681, he was appointed during the papacy of Pope Innocent XI as Bishop of Conversano. On 26 January 1681, he was consecrated bishop by Alessandro Crescenzi (cardinal), Bishop of Recanati e Loreto, with Pier Antonio Capobianco, Bishop Emeritus of Lacedonia, and Antonio Savo de' Panicoli, Bishop of Termoli, serving as co-consecrators. On 18 April 1701, he was appointed during the papacy of Pope Clement XI as Archbishop of Cosenza. He served as Archbishop of Cosenza until his death on 4 June 1725.

While bishop, he was the principal co-consecrator of Nicola Cirillo, Bishop of Nicastro (1692).

== External links and additional sources ==
- Cheney, David M. "Archdiocese of Cosenza-Bisignano". Catholic-Hierarchy.org. (for Chronology of Bishops) ^{[self-published]}
- Chow, Gabriel. "Metropolitan Archdiocese of Cosenza-Bisignano (Italy)". GCatholic.org. (for Chronology of Bishops) ^{[self-published]}
- Cheney, David M. "Diocese of Conversano-Monopoli". Catholic-Hierarchy.org. (for Chronology of Bishops) ^{[self-published]}
- Chow, Gabriel. "Diocese of Conversano-Monopoli (Italy)". GCatholic.org. (for Chronology of Bishops) ^{[self-published]}

Catholic Church titles
Preceded by Giovanni Stefano Sanarica	Bishop of Conversano; 1681–1701	Succeeded by Filippo Meda
Preceded by Eligio Caracciolo	Archbishop of Cosenza; 1701–1725	Succeeded by Vincenzo Maria d'Aragona
