= Gregorio Cruz =

Italian prelate (died 1577)

The Most Reverend Gregorio Cruz
- Bishop of Martirano
- Church: Catholic Church
- Diocese: Diocese of Martirano
- In office: 1569-1577
- Predecessor: Girolamo Federici
- Successor: Mariano Pierbenedetti

Orders
- Consecration: 16 Apr 1569 by Scipione Rebiba

Personal details
- Died: 1577 Martirano, Italy

Gregorio Cruz (died 1577) was a Roman Catholic prelate who served as Bishop of Martirano (1569–1577).

Cruz was ordained a priest in the Order of Preachers. On 1 Apr 1569, he was appointed during the papacy of Pope Pius V as Bishop of Martirano. On 16 Apr 1569, he was consecrated bishop by Scipione Rebiba, Cardinal-Priest of Sant'Angelo in Pescheria, with Giulio Antonio Santorio, Archbishop of Santa Severina, and Thomas Goldwell, Bishop of Saint Asaph, serving as co-consecrators. He served as Bishop of Martirano until his death in 1577.

== External links and additional sources ==
- Cheney, David M. "Diocese of Martirano (Martoranum)". Catholic-Hierarchy.org. (for Chronology of Bishops) ^{[self-published]}
- Chow, Gabriel. "Titular Episcopal See of Martirano (Italy)". GCatholic.org. (for Chronology of Bishops) ^{[self-published]}

Catholic Church titles
Preceded by Girolamo Federici	Bishop of Martirano; 1569–1577	Succeeded by Mariano Pierbenedetti
