= Saracena =

Saracena Sarakinì (Greek)
- Comune
- Comune di Saracena
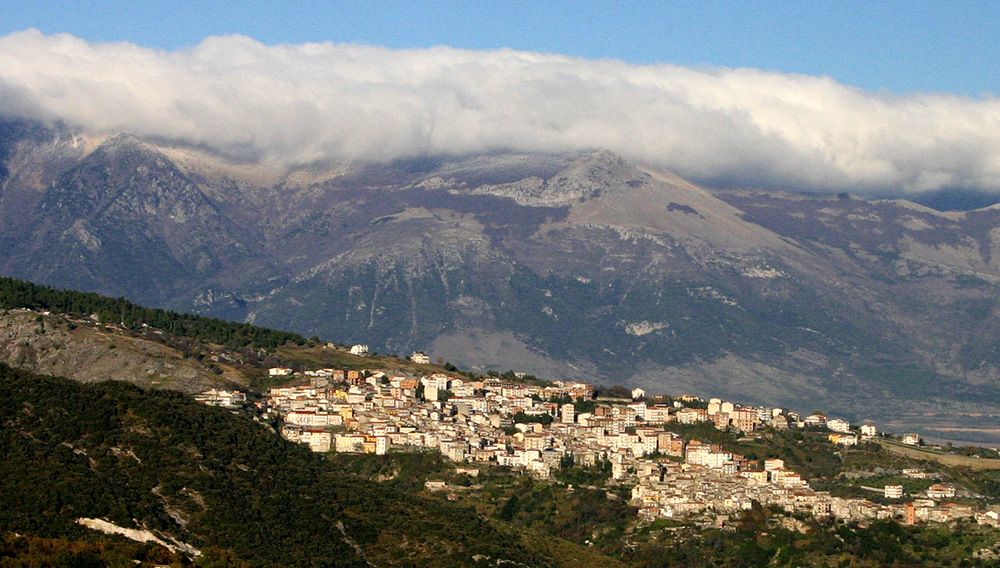
- View of Saracena from Lungro

- Location within Italy Location within Calabria
- Coordinates: 39°46′N 16°9′E
- Country: Italy
- Region: Calabria
- Province: Cosenza (CS)
- Frazioni: Zoccalia

Area
  - Total: 111.51 km^{2} (43.05 sq mi)
- Elevation: 606 m (1,988 ft)

Population (2018-01-01)
  - Total: 4,082
  - Density: 36.61/km^{2} (94.81/sq mi)
- Demonym: Saracenari
- Time zone: UTC+1 (CET)
  - Summer (DST): UTC+2 (CEST)
- Postal code: 87010
- Dialing code: 0981
- Patron saint: Saint Leo of Catania
- Saint day: 19 February
- Website: Official website

Saracena (Greek: Sarakine) is a town and comune in the province of Cosenza in the Calabria region of southern Italy. The town is bordered by Altomonte, Castrovillari, Firmo, Lungro, Morano Calabro, Mormanno, Orsomarso and San Basile and is home to the Church of San Leone, a 12th-century Byzantine church. The town's patron is San Leone di Catania, who is celebrated twice a year, once in the spring, then again in late summer.

Like Palermo and Tropea, Saracena was renowned for its souk (or street market) during the period of Arab Sicily from the ninth century until the Norman era. Arab-Sicilian influence remained strong until the 13th century.

== Wines ==
The village of Saracena is noted for the specialty dessert wine produced in the area, Moscato di Saracena, made in a passito (straw wine) style from a blend of several white Italian grape varieties including Coda di Volpe bianca (known locally as Guarnaccia bianca), Malvasia bianca di Candia, Addoraca and Muscat blanc à Petits Grains (known locally as Moscatello d Saracena).
