= Addoraca =

Variety of grape

Addoraca is a white Italian wine grape variety that is grown in the Calabria region of southern Italy where it is blended with Coda di Volpe bianca, Malvasia bianca di Candia and Muscat blanc à Petits Grains in the passito dessert wine Moscato di Saracena.

== History ==
Addoraca is believed to have originated in the Calabria region of southern Italy where it is still grown in the province of Cosenza (highlighted) today.

Ampelographers believe that Addoraca likely originated in the Calabria region where the name Addoraca means "perfumed" in the local Calabrian dialect. The grape has a long history of being a minor blending component in the Moscato di Saracena dessert wine that is a specialty of the village of Saracena.

== Wine regions ==
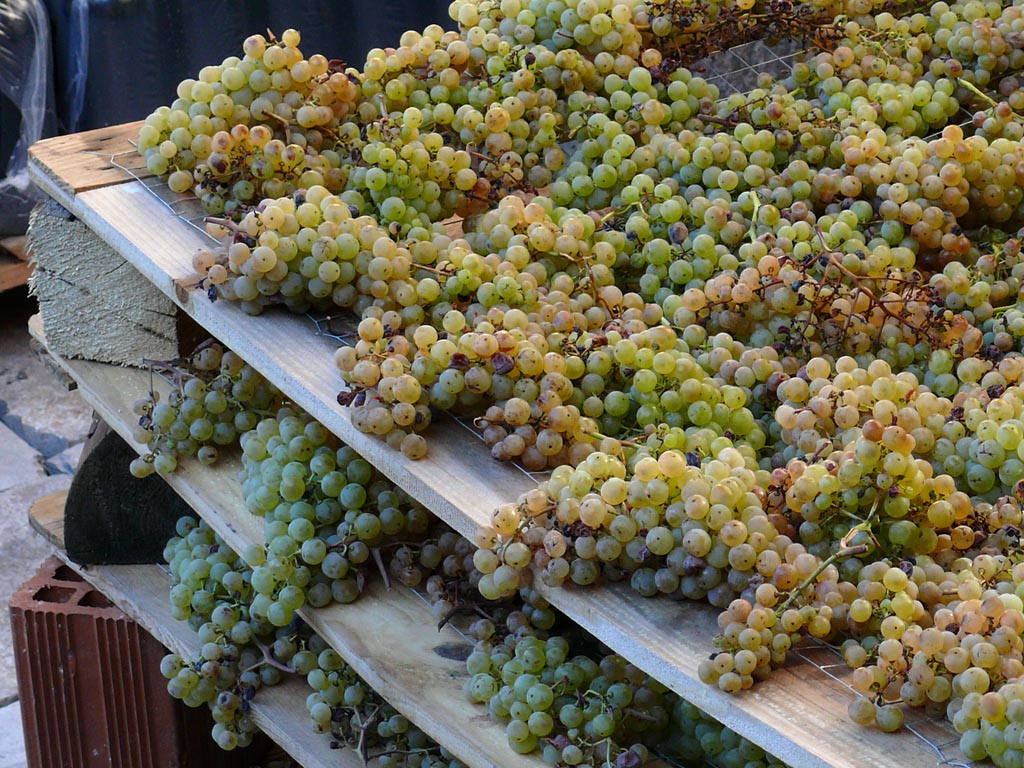
Addoraca is often used in the production of passito-style wines where freshly harvested grapes (example) are laid out on racks or straw mats to dry out, concentrating sugars which produces very sweet, dessert wines.

Today Addoraca is almost exclusively found in the province of Cosenza in Calabria where it is most notably used in the production of the straw wine Moscato di Saracena where it is blended with Muscat blanc à Petits Grains (known locally as Moscatello di Saracena), Coda di Volpe bianca (known locally as Guarnaccia bianca) and Malvasia bianca di Candia.

== Synonyms ==
Over the years, Addoraca has also been known under the synonym Odoacra, though this synonym is not officially recognized by the Vitis International Variety Catalogue (VIVC).
