= Giovanni Stamati =

Italian Greek-Catholic bishop (1912–1987)

Most Reverend Giovanni Stamati
- Eparch of Lungro
- Church: Italo-Albanian Catholic Church
- Province: Eparchy of Lungro
- Appointed: 20 February 1979
- Term ended: 7 June 1987
- Predecessor: Giovanni Mele
- Successor: Ercole Lupinacci

Orders
- Ordination: 14 May 1935
- Consecration: 29 June 1967 by Giovanni Mele

Personal details
- Born: Giovanni Stamati; 9 June 1912 Plataci, Kingdom of Italy
- Died: 7 June 1987 (aged 74) Lungro, Italy
- Education: Pontifical Greek College of Saint Athanasius

Giovanni Stamati (9 June 1912 – 7 June 1987) was an Italian hierarch of the Italo-Albanian Catholic Church. He served as the second Eparch of the Eparchy of Lungro from 1979 until his death in 1987.

== Biography ==
Stamati was born in Plataci, an Arbëreshë community in the Province of Cosenza. He pursued his ecclesiastical studies at the Pontifical Greek College of Saint Athanasius in Rome. He was ordained a priest on 14 May 1935.

On 25 March 1967, Pope Paul VI appointed him Apostolic Administrator sede plena of the Eparchy of Lungro and Titular Bishop of Antiphrae. He received his episcopal consecration on 29 June 1967 from Bishop Giovanni Mele. Following the death of the first Eparch, Giovanni Mele, Stamati was officially appointed Eparch of Lungro on 20 February 1979.

During his tenure, Stamati was a staunch advocate for the preservation of the Byzantine Rite and the Arbëresh language within the liturgy. He was instrumental in the cultural revival of the Italo-Albanian identity and contributed numerous articles to scholarly journals regarding the history and canon law of the Eastern Catholic Churches.

He died in Lungro on 7 June 1987, just two days before his 75th birthday.
