= Eligio Caracciolo =

Roman Catholic archbishop (1654–1700)

Most Reverend Eligio Caracciolo
- Archbishop of Cosenza
- Church: Catholic Church
- Archdiocese: Archdiocese of Cosenza
- In office: 1694–1700
- Predecessor: Gennaro Sanfelice
- Successor: Andrea Brancaccio

Orders
- Consecration: 21 March 1694 by Fabrizio Spada

Personal details
- Born: 1654 Naples, Italy
- Died: 17 October 1700 (age 46) Cosenza, Italy

Eligio Caracciolo, C.R. (1654 – 17 October 1700) was a Roman Catholic prelate who served as Archbishop of Cosenza (1694–1700).

== Biography ==
Eligio Caracciolo was born in Naples, Italy in 1654 and ordained a priest in the Congregation of Clerics Regular of the Divine Providence. On 15 March 1694, he was appointed during the papacy of Pope Innocent XII as Archbishop of Cosenza. On 21 March 1694, he was consecrated bishop by Fabrizio Spada, Cardinal-Priest of San Crisogono with Michelangelo Mattei, Titular Patriarch of Antioch, and Giovanni Battista Visconti Aicardi, Bishop of Novara, serving as co-consecrators. He served as Archbishop of Cosenza until his death on 17 October 1700.

== External links and additional sources ==
- Cheney, David M. "Archdiocese of Cosenza-Bisignano". Catholic-Hierarchy.org. (for Chronology of Bishops) ^{[self-published]}
- Chow, Gabriel. "Metropolitan Archdiocese of Cosenza-Bisignano (Italy)". GCatholic.org. (for Chronology of Bishops) ^{[self-published]}

Catholic Church titles
Preceded by Gennaro Sanfelice	Archbishop of Cosenza; 1694–1700	Succeeded by Andrea Brancaccio
