= San Leone, Saracena =

Church building in Saracena, Italy

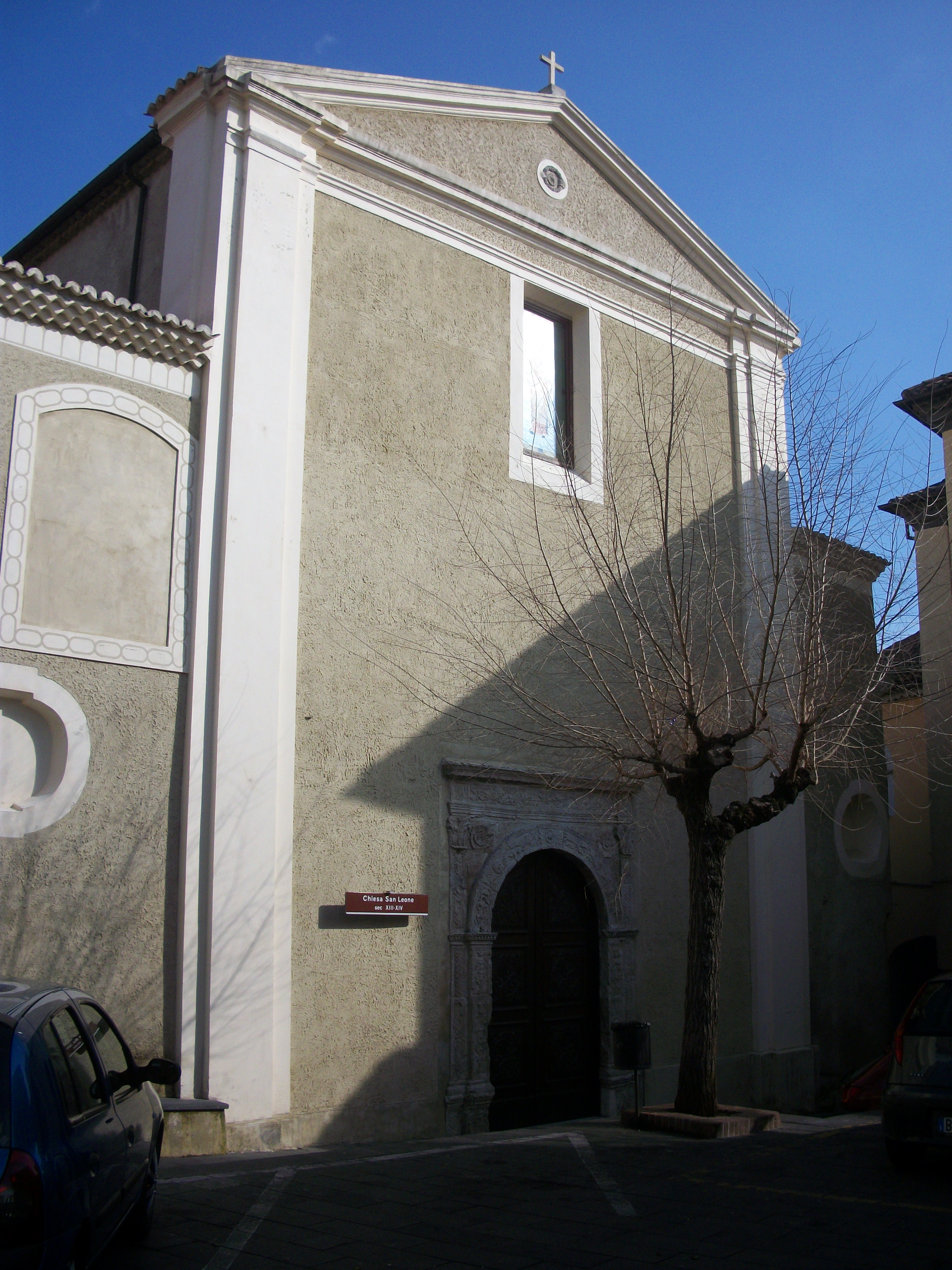

San Leone is a 12th-century Byzantine church located in Saracena, region of Calabria, Italy.

== History ==
Built in the Greek Cross layout typical of churches of Byzantine cult (11th century), the church, originally dedicated to St Catherine of Alexandria, was reconsecrated to St Leo in the 13th century by bishop Guglielmo di Bisignano. The layout has elements of both Romanesque and early Gothic architecture. For example, the bell-tower has mullioned windows. In the 17th century during the Sanseverino rule of the region, the church was heavily ornamented in a Baroque fashion. On the ceiling of the central nave are frescoes depicting four episodes of the Old Testament: the Sacrifice of Abraham, Judith and Holofernes, the Good Shepherd, and a Coronation of the Virgin. The interior houses 12 altars. They include a marble Mannerist style statue of the Virgin and a ciborium (1522) by an unknown Tuscan sculptor.

The portal decorated with yellow stone, was carved in Renaissance style by a local 16th-century artist. To the left of the entrance is the 16th-century baptismal font with stone base with a sculpted lion and foliage. The lion holds the seal of the church with a bishop's mitre, and the words S. Leo 1592. Above the portal are statuettes depicting a baptism.

The main altar, with a polychrome baroque balustrade, has a 16th-century marble Virgin. The apse is frescoed with angels and a depiction of heaven. At the left in the choir is a fresco of St Heliodorus. In the right nave, near the secondary door, is the 17th-century altar of Santa Maria degli Angeli, housing the marble statue of Santa Maria degli Angeli with Child-Jesus. The Virgin wrapped in thick draperies dates back to the seventeenth century and is of Neapolitan manufacture built in Baroque style. The work was transferred to San Leone from its original location in the town's Capuchin monastery, which was suppressed by the French military. The church underwent a major restoration in 1960.
