= Giuseppe Sanfelice =

Roman Catholic bishop (1615–1660)

Most Reverend Giuseppe Sanfelice
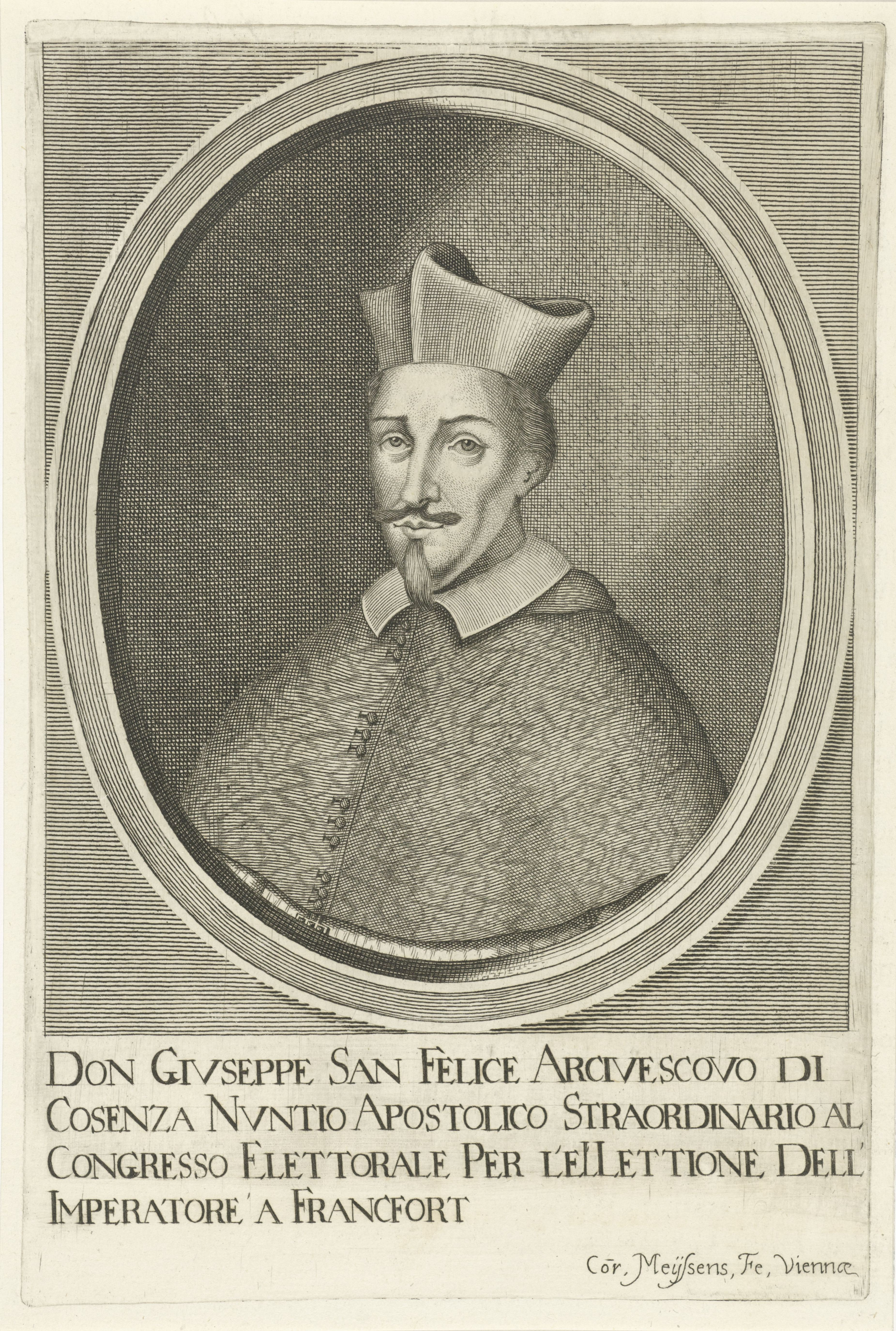
- Church: Catholic Church
- Archdiocese: Archdiocese of Cosenza-Bisignano
- In office: 1650–1660
- Predecessor: Alfonso Maurelli
- Successor: Gennaro Sanfelice

Orders
- Ordination: 25 May 1649
- Consecration: 16 Oct 1650 by Pier Luigi Carafa (seniore)

Personal details
- Born: 1615 Naples, Italy
- Died: 20 November 1660 (aged 44–45)

Giuseppe Sanfelice or Francisco Maria Sanfelice (1615 – 25 November 1660) was a Roman Catholic prelate who served as Apostolic Nuncio to Germany (1652–1659) and Archbishop of Cosenza (1650–1660).

== Biography ==
Giuseppe Sanfelice was born in 1615 in Naples, Italy and ordained a priest on 25 May 1649. On 22 Aug 1650, he was appointed during the papacy of Pope Innocent X as Archbishop of Cosenza. On 16 Oct 1650, he was consecrated bishop by Pier Luigi Carafa (seniore), Cardinal-Priest of Santi Silvestro e Martino ai Monti, with Ranuccio Scotti Douglas, Bishop Emeritus of Borgo San Donnino, and Pietro Vidoni (seniore), Bishop of Lodi, serving as co-consecrators. On 13 Apr 1652, he was appointed during the papacy of Pope Innocent X as Apostolic Nuncio to Germany where he served until Sep 1659. He served as Archbishop of Cosenza until his death on 20 Nov 1660.

While bishop, he was the principal co-consecrator of Francesco Zeno, Bishop of Capodistria (1660); and Guido Bentivoglio, Bishop of Bertinoro (1660).

== External links and additional sources ==
- Cheney, David M. "Archdiocese of Cosenza-Bisignano". Catholic-Hierarchy.org. (for Chronology of Bishops) ^{[self-published]}
- Chow, Gabriel. "Metropolitan Archdiocese of Cosenza-Bisignano (Italy)". GCatholic.org. (for Chronology of Bishops) ^{[self-published]}
- Cheney, David M. "Nunciature to Germany". Catholic-Hierarchy.org. ^{[self-published]}
- Chow, Gabriel. "Apostolic Nunciature to Germany". GCatholic.org. ^{[self-published]}

Catholic Church titles
Preceded by Alfonso Maurelli	Archbishop of Cosenza; 1650–1660	Succeeded by Gennaro Sanfelice
Preceded by Fabio Chigi	Apostolic Nuncio to Germany; 1652–1659	Succeeded by Agostino Franciotti
