= Gennaro Sanfelice =

Italian prelate (1622-1694)

Most Reverend Gennaro Sanfelice
- Archbishop of Cosenza
- Church: Catholic Church
- Archdiocese: Archdiocese of Cosenza
- In office: 1661–1694
- Predecessor: Giuseppe Sanfelice
- Successor: Eligio Caracciolo

Orders
- Consecration: 30 November 1661 by Giulio Cesare Sacchetti

Personal details
- Born: 1622 Naples, Italy
- Died: 19 February 1694 (aged 71–72) Cosenza, Italy

Gennaro Sanfelice (1622 – 19 February 1694) was a Roman Catholic prelate who served as Archbishop of Cosenza (1661–1694).

== Biography ==
Gennaro Sanfelice was born in Naples, Italy in 1622. On 21 November 1661, he was appointed during the papacy of Pope Alexander VII as Archbishop of Cosenza. On 30 November 1661, he was consecrated bishop by Giulio Cesare Sacchetti, Cardinal-Bishop of Sabina, with Ottaviano Carafa, Titular Archbishop of Patrae, and Emilio Bonaventura Altieri, Bishop of Camerino, serving as co-consecrators. He served as Archbishop of Cosenza until his death on 19 February 1694.

== External links and additional sources ==
- Cheney, David M. "Archdiocese of Cosenza-Bisignano". Catholic-Hierarchy.org. (for Chronology of Bishops) ^{[self-published]}
- Chow, Gabriel. "Metropolitan Archdiocese of Cosenza-Bisignano (Italy)". GCatholic.org. (for Chronology of Bishops) ^{[self-published]}

Catholic Church titles
Preceded by Giuseppe Sanfelice	Archbishop of Cosenza; 1661–1694	Succeeded by Eligio Caracciolo
