= Italo-Albanese Eparchy of Lungro =

Eastern Catholic eparchy in Italy

Eparchy of Lungro Eparchia Lungrensis Eparchia di Lungro Eparhia e Ungrës
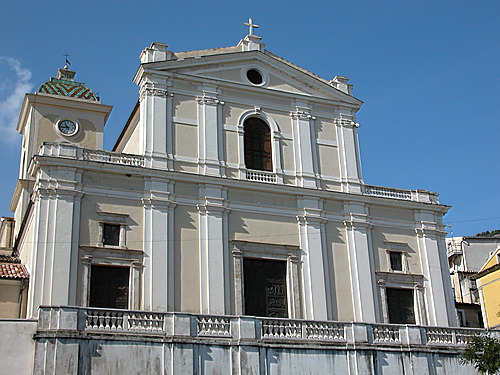

Location
- Country: Italy
- Ecclesiastical province: Immediately Subject to the Holy See
- Coordinates: 39°45′N 16°07′E

Statistics
- Population: Total; Catholics: (as of 2023); 32,175 ▼; 32,000 (est.) ▼
- Parishes: 30 ▲

Information
- Denomination: Italo-Albanian Catholic Church
- Rite: Byzantine Rite
- Established: 13 February 1919
- Cathedral: St Nicholas Cathedral, Lungro
- Patron saint: Saint Nicholas
- Secular priests: 46 ▲

Current leadership
- Pope: Leo XIV
- Bishop: Donato Oliverio

Map

Website
- eparchialungro.it

The Eparchy of Lungro (Italian: Eparchia di Lungro; Albanian: Eparhia e Ungrës) is an eparchy (diocese) of the Italo-Albanian Catholic Church, an Eastern Catholic church sui iuris of Byzantine Rite in Calabria, Italy. The town of Lungro is about 28 km or 17.5 mi west-southwest of Cassano all'Jonio.

== History ==
=== Albanians and Greek rites ===
Beginning in the mid-15th century, under pressure from advancing hostile Turkish forces, numbers of Albanians and Slavs from western Greece, Epirus, and Albania migrated to Italy, all along the Adriatic coast, but especially to the Abruzzi and Calabria. For the most part they were Catholics, of the Greek (Byzantine) rite, and in communion with Rome. In Calabria, they did not assimilate, but kept to their own villages under the rule of their own chiefs, whose position was sanctioned by the kings of Naples. Unsympathetic Latin bishops, however, sought repeatedly to get the Greek rite Catholics to conform to Latin church expectations. This was particularly difficult in the matter of married Greek rite clergy, and the willingness of parishoners to cross the boundaries of rites to receive the sacraments.

==== Benedict XIV and Greek rites ====
In the papal bull "Etsi pastoralis" of 26 May 1742, Pope Benedict XIV attempted to remedy some of the abuses and lessen the tensions, forbidding Latin rite bishops from interfering with the use of the Greek rite. "Nor do we allow any Latin Ordinary to molest or to disturb these or any of them. And we inhibit all and any prelates or persons from blaspheming, reproving, or blaming the rites of the Greeks, which were approved in the Council of Florence or elsewhere." His measures failed to have the desired effect.

==== Benedict XV and investigation of solutions ====
After nearly two centuries of debate, dissention and disobedience in Calabria between adherents of the Latin rite and those of the Greek rite, including bishops, priests, and laity, Pope Pius X intervened and granted Bishop Giovanni Barcia, titular bishop of Croia (Croiensis), the faculties to confer holy orders on Greek rite clerics of Calabria. Barcia, however, died on 2 December 1912. Pope Benedict XV finally felt compelled to intervene. He ordered the Sacred Congregation de Propaganda fide pro negotiis rituum orientalium to prepare proposals for the administration and reformation of the churches of the Greek rite, and on 19 November 1917, their recommendation decision was taken to create a new diocese. The diocese (or eparchy) of Lungro was created in 1919, for the Greek rite members of the Italo-Albanian Catholic Church, Catholics of the Byzantine Rite who had emigrated, mostly from Epirus and Albania, to Sicily and Calabria. and made directly subject to the Holy See, and the Congregation for the Oriental Church.

==== Eparchy (diocese) of Lungro ====
The diocese received territory from the Archdiocese of Rossano, Diocese of Cassano all'Jonio and Diocese of San Marco e Bisignano.

The parish church of S. Nicholas of Myra in the town of Lungro was deemed sufficiently suitable and convenient, and was designated the new cathedral.

Realizing that the new diocese (eparchy) was too small and poor to construct and support a seminary to train junior clergy, Pope Benedict XV ordered that five positions be reserved at the new pontifical seminary located at the Basilian monastery of Cryptoferrata (Grottaferrata).

== Ordinaries of the Italo-Albanese Catholic Church ==
- (1735–1740) : Felice Samuele Rodotà
- (1742–1757) : Nicolò De Marchis
- (1757–1789) : Giacinto Archiopoli
- (1792–1806) : Francesco Bugliari
- (1807–1833) : Domenico Bellusci
- (1833–1858) : Gabriele De Marchis
- (1858–1875) : Agostino Franco
- (1875–1888) : Giuseppe Bugliari
- (1889–1896) : Giuseppe Schirò
- (1902–1912) : Giovanni Barcia

== Bishops of Lungro ==
- (1919–1979) : Giovanni Mele
- (1979–1987) : Giovanni Stamati
- (1987–2010) : Ercole Lupinacci
- (2010–2012) : Salvatore Nunnari Apostolic Administrator
- (12 May 2012 – present) : Donato Oliverio

== See also ==
- Diocese of Cassano all'Jonio
- Arbëreshë people
- Byzantine Rite
- Italo-Albanian Catholic Church

== Sources ==
=== Episcopal and diocesan lists ===
- Ritzler, Remigius; Sefrin, Pirminus (1958). Hierarchia catholica medii et recentis aevi (in Latin). Vol. 6 (1730-1799). Patavii: Messagero di S. Antonio.
- Ritzler, Remigius; Sefrin, Pirminus (1968). Hierarchia Catholica medii et recentioris aevi (in Latin). Vol. 7 (1800–1846). Monasterii: Libr. Regensburgiana.
- Ritzler, Remigius; Sefrin, Pirminus (1978). Hierarchia catholica Medii et recentioris aevi (in Latin). Vol. 8 (1846–1903). Il Messaggero di S. Antonio.
- Pięta, Zenon (2002). Hierarchia catholica medii et recentioris aevi (in Latin). Vol. 9 (1903–1922). Padua: Messagero di San Antonio. ISBN 978-88-250-1000-8.

=== Studies ===
- Accattatis, Luigi (1877). Le biografie degli uomini illustri delle Calabrie., (in Italian), Volume 4 Cosenza: Migliaccio 1877.
- Capialbi, Vito (1913). La continuazione dell' Italia Sacra del1'Ughelli per i Vescovadi di Calabria. Napoli 1913.
- Fortescue, Adrian (1923). The Uniate Eastern Churches. The Byzantine rite in Italy, Sicily, Syria and Egypt. London: B. Oates & Washburne 1923.
- Nasse, George Nicholas (1964). The Italo-Albanian Villages of Southern Italy. Washington DC: National Academy of Sciences-National Research Council, 1964.

=== External links ===
- Eparchy of Lungro: web page (in Italian)
- Info and multimedia from the Eparchy of Lungro
