= Francescantonio Nolè =

Italian archbishop (1948–2022)

Francescantonio Nolè O.F.M. Conv.
- Metropolitan & Archbishop of Cosenza-Bisignano
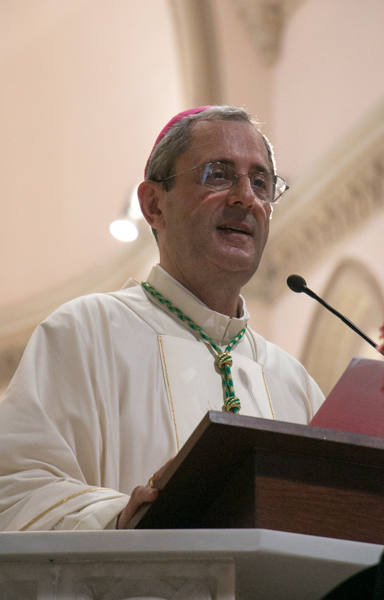
- Church: Roman Catholic Church
- Archdiocese: Cosenza-Bisignano
- See: Cosenza-Bisignano
- Appointed: 15 May 2015
- Term ended: 15 September 2022
- Predecessor: Salvatore Nunnari
- Successor: Giovanni Checchinato
- Previous post: Bishop of Tursi-Lagonegro (2000–2015)

Orders
- Ordination: 2 September 1973 by Vittorio Maria Costantini
- Consecration: 10 December 2000 by Giovanni Battista Re

Personal details
- Born: 9 June 1948 Potenza, Italy
- Died: 15 September 2022 (aged 74)
- Coat of arms: Francescantonio Nolè O.F.M. Conv.'s coat of arms

Francescantonio Nolè (9 June 1948 – 15 September 2022) was an Italian Roman Catholic bishop. He had been Minister of the Conventual Franciscans for the Province of Campania and Lucania. He was bishop of Tursi-Lagonegro from 4 November 2000 to 15 May 2015. He served as the Archbishop of Cosenza-Bisignano from 15 May 2015. He died on 15 September 2022, at the age of 74.

Catholic Church titles
Preceded by Salvatore Nunnari	Archbishop of Cosenza Bisignano; 2015–2022	Succeeded by Giovanni Checchinato
Preceded by Rocco Talucci	Bishop of Tursi-Lagonegro; 2000–2015	Succeeded by Vincenzo Carmine Orofino
