= Diocese of Concordia-Pordenone =

Roman Catholic diocese in Italy

Coordinates: 45.7667°N 12.8500°E

Diocese of Concordia-Pordenone Dioecesis Concordiensis-Portus Naonis

Catholic
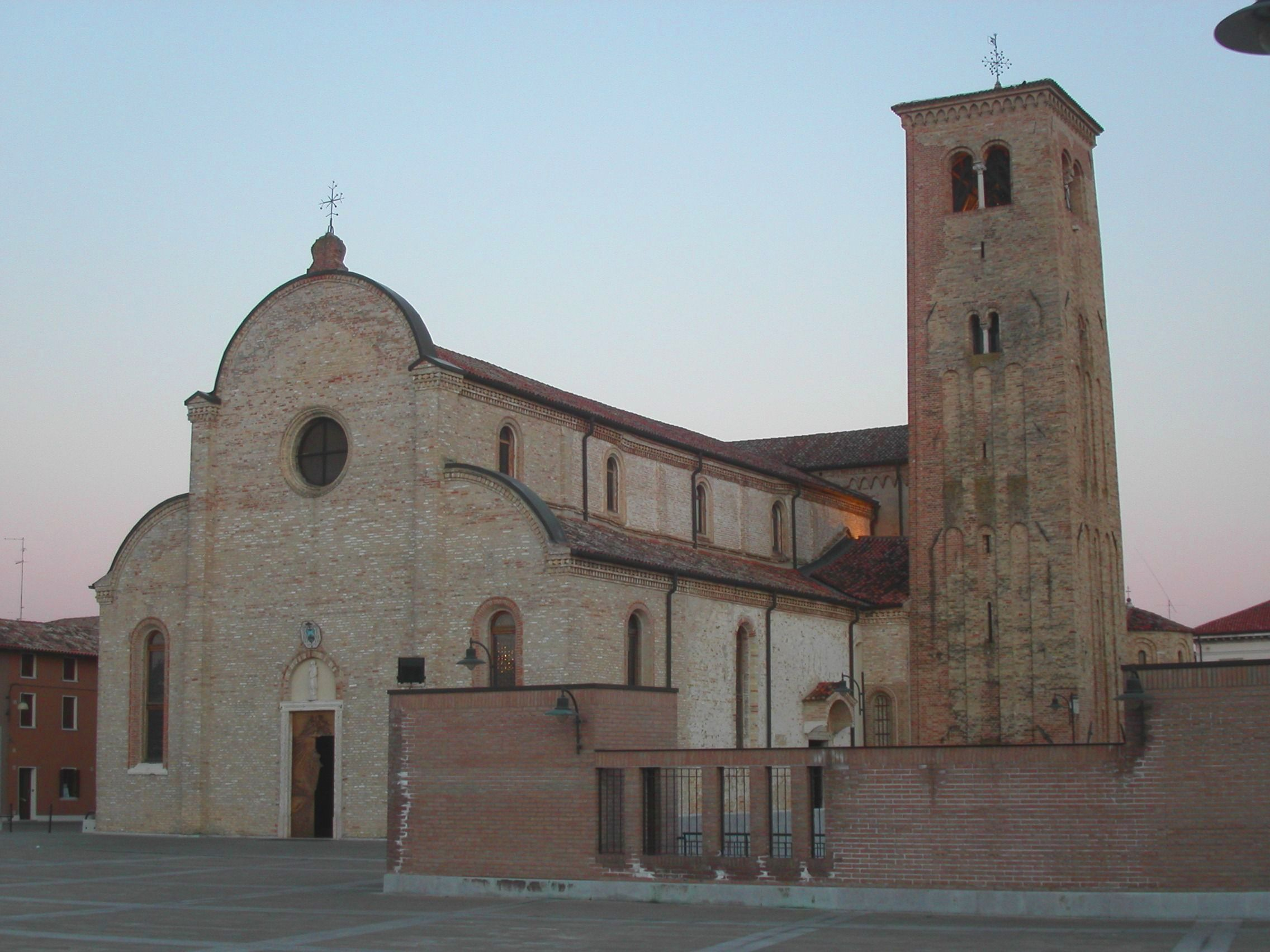
- Concordia Sagittaria Cathedral

Location
- Country: Italy
- Ecclesiastical province: Venice

Statistics
- Area: 2,675 km^{2} (1,033 sq mi)
- Population: Total; Catholics: (as of 2023); 378,090 ▲; 366,642 ▲ (97.0 ▼%)
- Parishes: 190 ▲

Information
- Denomination: Catholic Church
- Rite: Roman Rite
- Established: 4th Century
- Cathedral: Cattedrale di S. Stefano Protomartire (Concordia Sagittaria)
- Co-cathedral: Concattedrale di S. Marco (Pordenone)
- Secular priests: 213 (diocesan) ▼35 (Religious Orders) ▼25 Permanent Deacons ▲

Current leadership
- Pope: Leo XIV
- Bishop: Giuseppe Pellegrini
- Metropolitan Archbishop: Francesco Moraglia
- Bishops emeritus: Ovidio Poletto

Map

Website
- www.diocesi.concordia-pordenone.it

The Diocese of Concordia-Pordenone (Latin: Dioecesis Concordiensis-Portus Naonis) is a Latin diocese of the Catholic Church situated in northeastern Italy, at the northern end of the Adriatic Sea, between Venice and Udine. Since 1818, Concordia Veneta, has been a suffragan of the Archdiocese of Venice. Bishop Andrea Casasola attended the Provincial Council of the Provincia Veneta in October 1859 as a suffragan of the Patriarch of Venice, Cardinal Giuseppe Luigi Trevisanato. The name of the diocese was changed to its present form in 1971.

== History ==
Concordia is an ancient Venetian city, called by the Romans Colonia Julia, and is situated on the Lemene River, between the Rivers Tagliamento and Livenza, two miles south of Portogruaro, not far from the Adriatic. Today there remain of the city only ruins and the ancient cathedral. The eighty-nine martyrs of Concordia, who were put to death under Diocletian, are held in veneration; their cult is recent, however, and based on late and dubious material.

The monk, author, and controversialist, Tyrannius Rufinus (345–411), was born in Concordia, but was baptized in Aquileia, where he became a monk.

During the fifth century the city was destroyed by Attila.

The first known bishop of Concordia is Clarissimus, who, at a provincial synod of Aquileia in 579, helped to prolong the Schism of the Three Chapters; this council was attended by Augustinus, later Bishop of Concordia, who in 590 signed the petition presented by the schismatics to Emperor Mauricius. Bishop Johannes transferred the episcopal residence to Caorle (606), retaining, however, the title of Concordia.

On 12 February 928, Hugh of Arles, King of Italy, granted to the Patriarch of Aquileia the right to invest the bishops of Concordia.

The medieval bishops seem to have resided near the ancient cathedral, and to have wielded temporal power, which, however, they were unable to retain. The bishops of Concordia held one of the twenty-four canonicates in the cathedral Chapter of Aquileia; their functions were carried out by an appointed vicar.

In 1586, during the episcopate of the elder Matteo Sanudo, the episcopal residence was transferred to Portogruaro. In 1974 the episcopal residence was definitively transferred to Pordenone.

=== Canons and cathedral ===
The cathedral was staffed and administered by a corporation of Canons, called the Chapter. In 1191, Bishop Romulus decreed the reduction in number of the Canons from twenty-two to sixteen. The change was sanctioned by the Patriarch of Aquileia on 14 December 1191. He also renewed the obligation of the Canons to reside together.

Bishop Articus da Castello (1318–1331) attempted, without success, to reform the cathedral Chapter, by appointing Canons who would agree to live in Concordia, where there was a dormitorium canonice and a claustrum. The problem was made difficult because both the Provost and the Dean were non-residential. In order to ensure that the regular liturgical services were held in the cathedral at Concordia, on 3 April 1339 Bishop Guido de Guisis (1334–1347) established three mansionarii to assume the duties that the Canons would not perform.

Returning from the Council of Trent, Bishop Pietro Querini (1537–1584) began a counter-reformational program with a general visitation of the institutions of his diocese (1566), during which he indicated to the cathedral Chapter that they should put their own discipline in order, and that they should address the equitable distribution of prebends. The result was a capitulary act of 15 January 1567, declaring that the Chapter had three dignitaries (the Dean, the Provost, and the Archdeacon), and assigning specific prebends to six Canons who were priests, two to deacons, and one to a subdeacon. In 2020, the cathedral had a Chapter composed of three dignities (the Dean, the Theologus and the Penitentiarius) and three Canons, with four honorary Canons.

=== Diocesan synods ===
A diocesan synod was an irregularly held, but important, meeting of the bishop of a diocese and his clergy. Its purpose was (1) to proclaim generally the various decrees already issued by the bishop; (2) to discuss and ratify measures on which the bishop chose to consult with his clergy; (3) to publish statutes and decrees of the diocesan synod, of the provincial synod, and of the Holy See.

Bishop Guido de Guisis (1334–1347) held a diocesan synod in 1335. On 4 August 1450, Bishop Giovanni Battista Legname (1443–1455) held a diocesan synod. On 8 April 1587, Bishop Matteo Sanudo (1585–1616) held a diocesan synod. Bishop Paolo Vallaresso (1693–1723) presided over a diocesan synod in the cathedral of S. Andrea in Portogruaro on 20–22 May 1697. Bishop Alvise Gabrieli (1761–1779) held a diocesan synod on 1–3 June 1767. Bishop Domenico Pio Rossi, O.P. (1881–1892) held a diocesan synod in the cathedral of S. Andrea on 16–18 April 1885.

== Bishops ==
=== to 1200 ===
...

- Clarissimus (attested 571–590)
- Augustus (attested 591)

...

- Anselmus (attested 827)

...

- Toringarius (attested 844)

...

- Albericus (attested 963, 964)
- Benzo (attested 996, 1001)

...

- Majo (attested 1015–1027)
- Ruodbertus (attested 1031)

...

- Dietwin (attested 1049, 1072)

...

- Riwinus (attested 1106)
- Rempot
- Otto (attested 1119–1120)
- Hermannus
- Gervicus (Gervinus)
- Cono (attested 1164–1173)
- Gerardus (attested 1177–1179)
- Ionathas (Gionata)
- Romulus (attested 1188–1192)

=== 1200 to 1500 ===
- Woldericus (1203–1213)
- Otto (attested 1216)
- Almericus (1216– )
- Fridericus da Prata (attested 1221–1250)
- Guilelmus (1251)
- Guarnerius (1251–1252)

Tiso (1252–1257) Administrator

- Albertus (1260–1268)
- Fulcherius (Di Zuccula), O.Min. (c. 1272–1293)
- Jacobus Ottonelli (1293–1317)
- Articus da Castello (1318–1331)
- Guido, O.Camald. (1331–1333)
- Hubertus de Cesena, C.R. (1333–1334)
- Guido de Guisis (1334–1347)
- Constantinus Savorgnano (1347–1348)
- Pietro de Clusello, O.P. (1348–1360)
- Guido de Blaysio (1361–1380)
- Ambrosius da Parma (1380–1389)
- Augustinus, O.E.S.A. (1389–1392)
- Antonio Panciera (1392–1402)
- Antonio da Ponte (1402–1409)
- Enrico da Strasoldo (1409–1432)
- Daniel Rampi Scoto (1433–1443)

Giovanni Battista Legname (1443–1455)

- Antonio Feletto (1455–1488)
- Leonello Chiericato (1488–1506)

=== 1500 to 1800 ===
- Francesco Argentino (1506–1511)
- Giovanni Argentino (1511–1533)

Cardinal Marino Grimani (1533–1537 Resigned) Administrator

- Pietro Querini (1537–1584)
- Marino Querini (1585)
- Matteo Sanudo (1585–1616 Resigned)
- Matteo Sanudo (1616–1641)
- Benedetto Cappello (1641–1667)
- Bartolomeo Gradenigo (1667–1668)
- Agostino Premoli (1668–1692)
- Paolo Vallaresso (1693–1723)
- Jacopo Maria Erizzo, O.P. (1724–1760)
- Alvise Maria Gabrieli (1761–1779)
- Giuseppe Maria Bressa, O.S.B. (1779–1817)

=== since 1800 ===
- Pietro Carlo Ciani (1819–1825)
- Carlo Fontanini, C.M. (1827–1848)
- Angelo Fusinato (1850–1854)
- Andrea Casasola (1855–1863)
- Nicolò Frangipane (1866–1872)
- Pietro Cappellari (1872–1881 Resigned)
- Domenico Pio Rossi, O.P. (1881–1892)
- Pietro Zamburlini (1893–1896)
- Francesco Isola (1896–1919 Resigned)
- Luigi Paulini (1919–1945)
- Vittorio D’Alessi (1945–1949)
- Vittorio De Zanche (1949–1977)

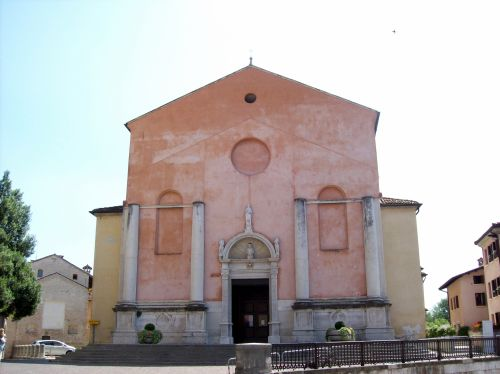
Co-cathedral in Pordenone

=== Diocese of Concordia-Pordenone ===
Name Changed: 12 January 1971

- Abramo Freschi (1977–1989 Retired)
- Sennen Corrà (1989–2000 Retired)
- Ovidio Poletto (2000–2011 Retired)
- Giuseppe Pellegrini (2011–)

== Books ==
=== Reference Works ===
- Eubel, Conradus, ed. (1913). Hierarchia catholica. Vol. Tomus 1 (second ed.). Münster: Libreria Regensbergiana. (in Latin)
- Eubel, Conradus, ed. (1914). Hierarchia catholica. Vol. Tomus 2 (second ed.). Münster: Libreria Regensbergiana. (in Latin)
- Eubel, Conradus, ed. (1923). Hierarchia catholica. Vol. Tomus 3 (second ed.). Münster: Libreria Regensbergiana.
- Gams, Pius Bonifatius (1873). Series episcoporum Ecclesiae catholicae: quotquot innotuerunt a beato Petro apostolo. Ratisbon: Typis et Sumptibus Georgii Josephi Manz. pp. 946–947. (Use with caution; obsolete)
- Gauchat, Patritius (Patrice) (1935). Hierarchia catholica IV (1592-1667). Münster: Libraria Regensbergiana. (in Latin)
- Ritzler, Remigius; Sefrin, Pirminus (1952). Hierarchia catholica medii et recentis aevi V (1667-1730). Patavii: Messagero di S. Antonio. (in Latin)
- Ritzler, Remigius; Sefrin, Pirminus (1958). Hierarchia catholica medii et recentis aevi VI (1730-1799). Patavii: Messagero di S. Antonio. (in Latin)
- Ritzler, Remigius; Sefrin, Pirminus (1968). Hierarchia Catholica medii et recentioris aevi sive summorum pontificum, S. R. E. cardinalium, ecclesiarum antistitum series... A pontificatu Pii PP. VII (1800) usque ad pontificatum Gregorii PP. XVI (1846) (in Latin). Vol. VII. Monasterii: Libr. Regensburgiana.
- Ritzler, Remigius; Pirminus Sefrin (1978). Hierarchia catholica Medii et recentioris aevi... A Pontificatu PII PP. IX (1846) usque ad Pontificatum Leonis PP. XIII (1903) (in Latin). Vol. VIII. Il Messaggero di S. Antonio.
- Pięta, Zenon (2002). Hierarchia catholica medii et recentioris aevi... A pontificatu Pii PP. X (1903) usque ad pontificatum Benedictii PP. XV (1922) (in Latin). Vol. IX. Padua: Messagero di San Antonio. ISBN 978-88-250-1000-8.

=== Studies ===
- Cappelletti, Giuseppe (1854). Le chiese d'Italia dalla loro origine sino ai nostri giorni (in Italian). Vol. decimo (10). Venezia: G. Antonelli. pp. 417–475.
- Ann. eccl. (Rome, 1907), 418-23
- Degani, Ernesto (1880). La Diocesi di Concordia, notizie e documenti (San Vito: Tipografia Pascatti, 1880). (in Italian)
- Degani, Ernesto (1904). Le nostre scuole nel Medioevo e il seminario di Concordia. Portogruaro 1904. (in Italian)
- Giacomuzzi, Lodovico (1928). La diocesi di Concordia. Cenno storico. Portogruaro: Tipografia Sociale. (in Italian)
- Gianni, Luca (2004). "Vita ed organizzazione interna della diocesi di Concordia in epoca medievale," in A. Scottà (ed.), Diocesi di Concordia (Padova, Gregoriana Libreria Editrice, 2004) (Storia religiosa del Veneto, 10), pp. 205–321. (in Italian)
- Kehr, Paul Fridolin (1923). Italia Pontificia Vol. VII:l Venetiae et Histria, Pars I: Provincia Aquileiensis. Berlin: Weidmann, pp. 72–80. (in Latin).
- Lanzoni, Francesco (1927). Le diocesi d'Italia dalle origini al principio del secolo VII (an. 604) (in Italian). Rome: Biblioteca Apostolica Vaticana. pp. 644–650.
- Marin, Eugenio (2003). "Il Capitolo cattedrale di Concordia nella prima età moderna." In: Università Ca’ Foscari, Venezia. Dipartimento di Studi Storici, Annali 2002. Studi e materiali dalle tesi di laurea, Milano, Unicopli, 2003, pp. 27–46.
- Schwartz, Gerhard (1907). Die Besetzung der Bistümer Reichsitaliens unter den sächsischen und salischen Kaisern: mit den Listen der Bischöfe, 951-1122. Leipzig: B.G. Teubner. pp. 50–51. (in German)
- Ughelli, Ferdinando (1720). Italia Sacra sive De Episcopis Italiae et insularum adjacentium (in Latin). Vol. Tomus quintus. Venezia: apud Sebastianum Coleti. pp. 323–368.
- Zambaldi, Antonio (1840). Monumenti storici di Concordia, già colonia romana nella regione veneta. Serie dei vescovi concordiesi ed annali della città di Portogruaro. (San Vito: Tipografia Pascatti, 1840)(in Italian)
