= Ercole Lupinacci =

Italian bishop (1933–2016)

Most Reverend Ercole Lupinacci
- Bishop
- Church: Italo-Albanian Catholic
- Diocese: Lungro
- Previous post: Bishop of Piana degli Albanesi

Orders
- Ordination: 22 November 1959
- Consecration: 8 August 1981 by Giovanni Stamati

Personal details
- Born: 23 November 1933 San Giorgio Albanese, Kingdom of Italy
- Died: 6 August 2016 (aged 82) San Cosmo Albanese, Italy
- Denomination: Italo-Albanian Catholic
- Occupation: Bishop
- Profession: Priest

Ercole Lupinacci (23 November 1933 – 6 August 2016) was an Italian of Arbëreshë ethnicity and Bishop of Italo-Albanian Catholic Eparchies of Piana degli Albanesi and Lungro.

== Biography ==
Ercole Lupinacci was born in San Giorgio Albanese on 23 November 1933. He was ordained an Italo-Albanian Catholic priest on 22 November 1959. He was appointed Bishop of Piana degli Abanesi on 25 March 1981 and ordained bishop on 8 August 1981 by Bishop Giovanni Stamati with principal co-consecrators, Archbishop Saba Youakim, B.S. and Archbishop Miroslav Stefan Marusyn.

On 22 November 1987, he was appointed Bishop of Lungro replacing the deceased Bishop Stamati. He retired from the See of Lungro on 10 August 2010 at age 76, and died on 6 August 2016, aged 82.

== Episcopal Genealogy ==
- Eparch Isaias Papadopoulos
- Eparch John Mele
- Eparch Giovanni Stamati
- Eparch Ercole Lupinacci

Catholic Church titles
Preceded by Giuseppe Perniciaro	Bishop of Piana degli Albanesi; 1981 - 1987	Succeeded by Sotir Ferrara
Preceded by Giovanni Stamati	Bishop of Lungro; 1987 – 2010	Succeeded by Donato Oliverio
