= Concordia Sagittaria =

- Comune
- Comune di Concordia Sagittaria
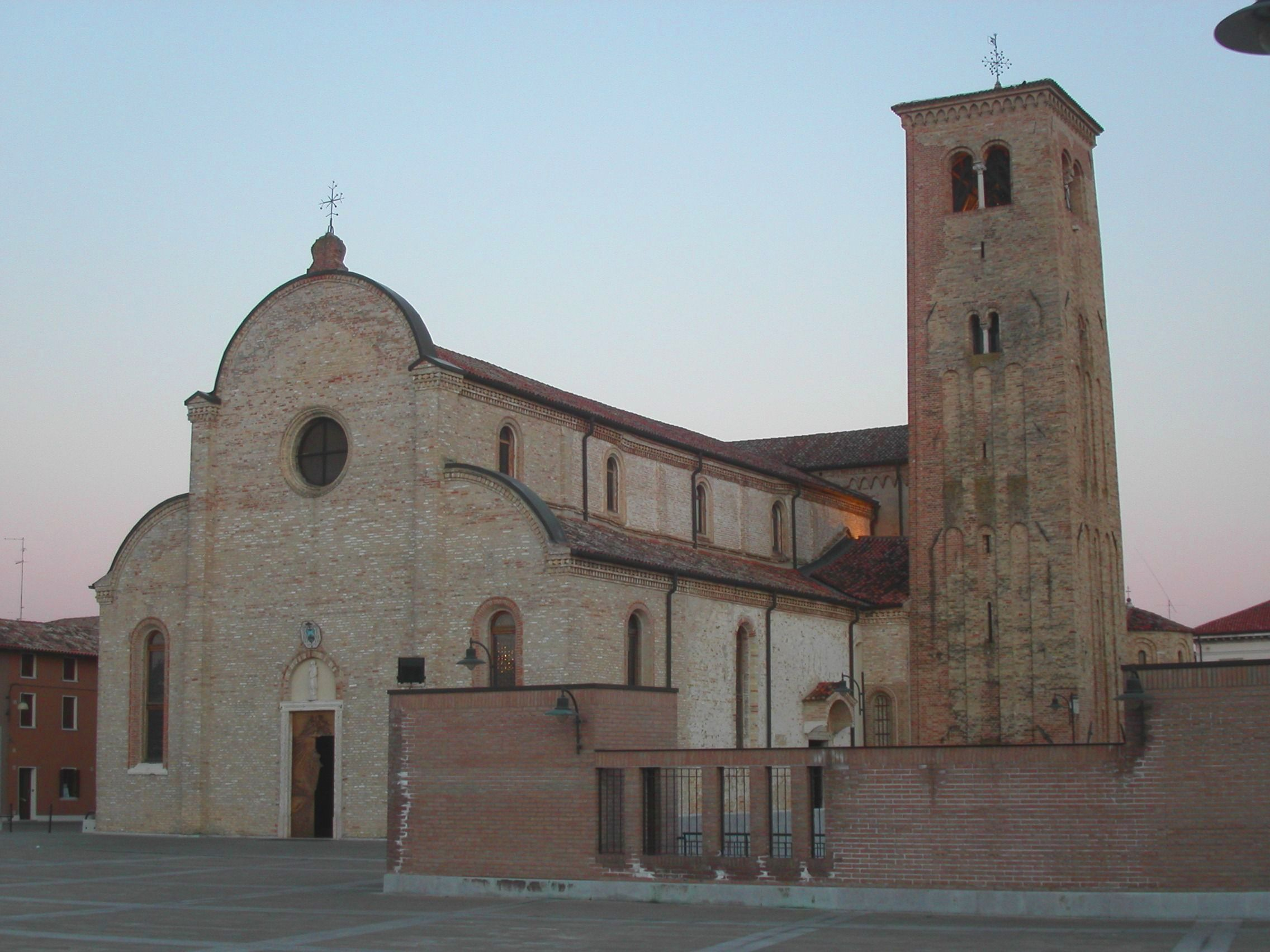
- Cathedral of Concordia Sagittaria.

- Coat of arms

- Location within Italy Location within Veneto
- Coordinates: 45°46′N 12°51′E
- Country: Italy
- Region: Veneto
- Metropolitan city: Venice (VE)
- Frazioni: Cavanella, Paludetto, Sindacale, Teson

Government
  - Mayor: Marco Geromin

Area
  - Total: 66.50 km^{2} (25.68 sq mi)
- Elevation: 4 m (13 ft)

Population (28 February 2007)
  - Total: 10,708
  - Density: 161.0/km^{2} (417.0/sq mi)
- Demonym: Concordiesi
- Time zone: UTC+1 (CET)
  - Summer (DST): UTC+2 (CEST)
- Postal code: 30023
- Dialing code: 0421
- Website: Official website

Concordia Sagittaria is a comune in the Metropolitan City of Venice, Veneto, Italy.

== History ==
The town was founded in 42 BC as Iulia Concordia by the Romans, where the Via Annia and the Via Postumia crossed each other. The establishment of the Diocese of Concordia dates from c. 380 AD. The city was taken and destroyed by Attila in 452 AD.

After the fall of the Western Roman Empire, it was part of the Lombard duchy of Cividale, and later became part first of the March of Friuli and then the Patriarchate of Aquileia.

In 1420, together with all of Friuli, it was annexed by the Republic of Venice.

In 1838, it was separated from Friuli to be included in the province of Venice.

== Main sights ==
- Trichora Martyrium (350 AD)
- Remains of the Roman Bridge (1st–2nd century AD)
- Bishop's Palace (15th century)
- Baptistery (11th century)
- Cathedral of St. Stephen (1466)
