= Archdiocese of Cosenza-Bisignano =

Latin Catholic archdiocese in Italy

Coordinates: 39.3000°N 16.2500°E

Archdiocese of Cosenza-Bisignano Archidioecesis Cosentina-Bisinianensis

Catholic
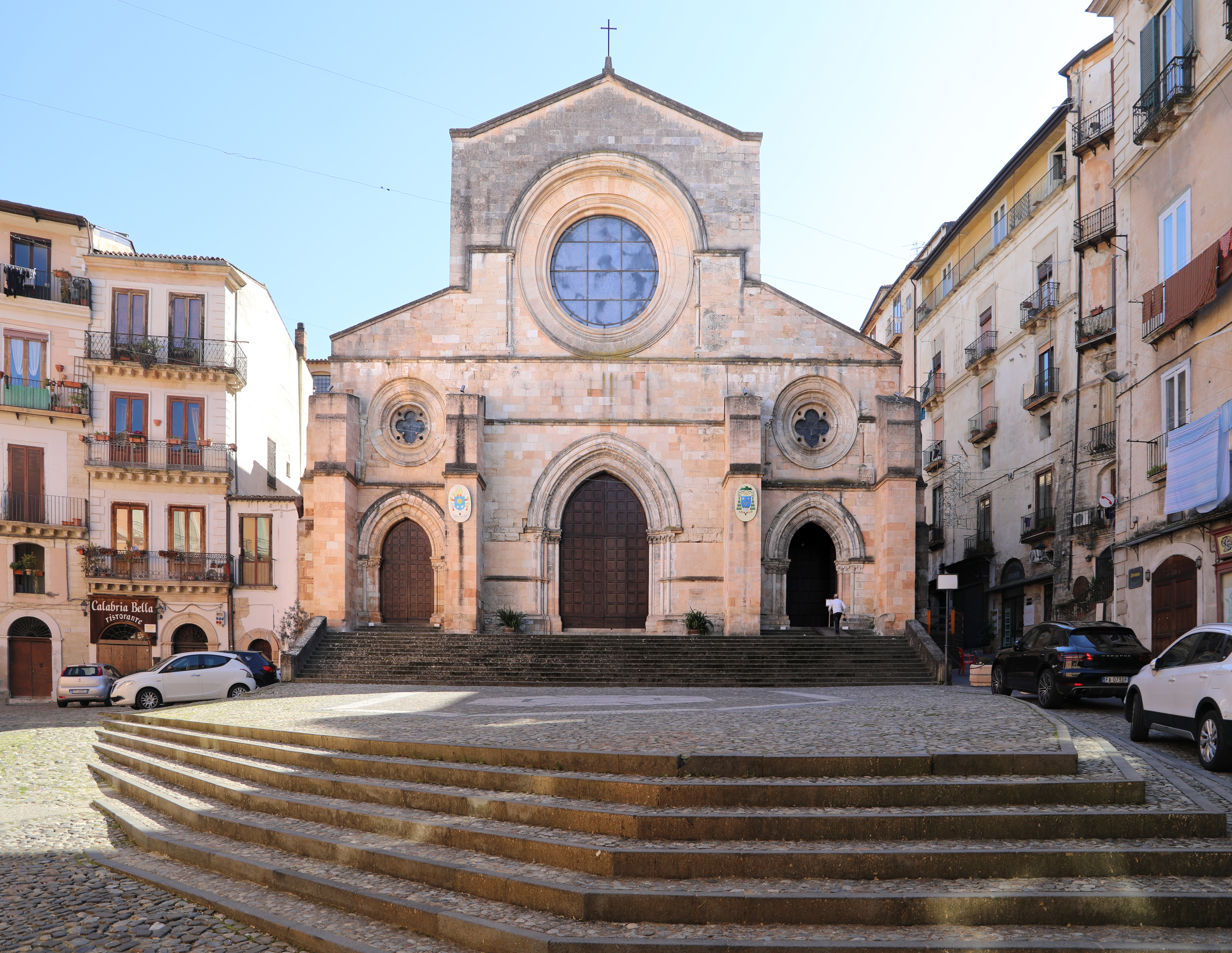
- Cathedral of Cosenza

Location
- Country: Italy
- Ecclesiastical province: Cosenza-Bisignano

Statistics
- Area: 979 sq mi (2,540 km^{2})
- Population: Total; Catholics: (as of 2023); 376,200 (est.) ▼; 374,100 ▼
- Parishes: 135

Information
- Denomination: Catholic Church
- Sui iuris church: Latin Church
- Rite: Roman Rite
- Established: 6th Century
- Cathedral: Cattedrale di S. Maria Assunta (Cosenza)
- Co-cathedral: Concattedrale di S. Maria Assunta (Bisignano)
- Patron saint: Madonna del Pilerio; Francesco di Paola; Beato Umile da Bisignano
- Secular priests: 156 (diocesan) ▲67 (Religious Orders) ▼36 Permanent Deacons

Current leadership
- Pope: Leo XIV
- Archbishop: Giovanni Checchinato
- Suffragans: sees: Cassano all’Jonio; Archdiocese of Rossano-Cariati; San Marco Argentano-Scalea
- Bishops emeritus: Salvatore Nunnari

Map

Website
- diocesicosenza.it

The Archdiocese of Cosenza-Bisignano (Latin: Archidioecesis Cosentina-Bisinianensisis) a Latin diocese of the Catholic Church in Calabria and has been a metropolitan see since 2001.

== History ==
The Gospel was first preached in Cosenza by missionaries from Reggio. It is pointed out, however, that there is no evidence for such claims, and that the earliest document dates from the early fifth century. The earliest known bishop of Cosenza is Palumbus, a correspondent (599) of Pope Gregory I.

In 903, the Emir Ibrahim, in his attempt to conquer Calabria, reached as far as Cosenza, where he died.

Under the Lombards, Salerno was the metropolitan, and Cosenza was one of its suffragans. In 994, Pope John XV confirmed the metropolitan status of Salerno.

Cosenza was raised to the dignity of an archbishopric about 1050. Among the best known Archbishops of Cosenza have been: Ruffo, who perished in the earthquake of 1184; the Cistercian Martino (1285), a prolific but uncritical writer; Taddeo, later Cardinal, Gaddi (1535), who obtained from Paul IV the privilege by which the cathedral canons of Cosenza wear the choir habit of the Vatican basilica; and Giuseppe Maria Sanfelice (1650), frequently charged by the Holy See with diplomatic missions.

Pope Innocent III (1198–1216) had planned to visit Sicily in order to drum up interest, funds, and volunteers, for his crusade in the Holy Land, but never did. His successor, Honorius III, assumed the obligation, but was persuaded not to go to Sicily by his advisors, due to the lack of organization, which might lead the faithful to think that the project was hopeless. On 8 July 1217, therefore, the pope appointed the Archbishop of Cosenza, the Cistercian monk Lucas, to go personally to Messina, to organize and preach the crusade. The archbishop was also to weed out the weak, incompetent, and the genuinely poor, dispensing them by papal authority from whatever oaths and promises they had undertaken.

The seminary of Cosenza was founded through the initiative of Cardinal Giovanni Evangelista Pallotta (1587–1591)

=== Cathedral and Chapter ===
The cathedral of Cosenza, like nearly all the cathedrals of the former Kingdom of Naples, is dedicated to the Taking Up of the Body of the Virgin Mary into Heaven. The older cathedral was dedicated to Saint Pancratius. Cosenza's cathedral was administered by a corporation, called the Chapter, composed of four dignities (the Dean-Penitentiary, the Archdeacon, the Cantor, and the Treasurer) and seventeen canons, one of whom is the Theologus and another the Sub-Cantor. The cathedral is the parish church for the entire city, and there are three suburban parishes.

A provincial synod was held by the metropolitan, Archbishop Fantino Petrignano from 10 May to 17 May 1579; its constitutions were published. A provincial synod was held by the archbishop of Cosenza, (Cardinal) Giovanni Evangelista Pallotta (1587–1591).

Archbishop Giovanni Battista Costanzo (1591–1617) presided over a diocesan synod of Cosenza in the metropolitan cathedral on 18 October 1592. He held a second diocesan synod in 1603.

In 1694, Cosenza had a population of c. 12,000, and the whole diocese contained 93 towns and villages. There were 12 religious houses of men, and 5 convents of women. The Franciscans held five churches, including ones by the Conventuals, the Observants, the Stricter Observants, and the Capuchins. There were also the Benedictines of Montecassino, the Dominicans, the Carmelites, the Discalced Carmelites of S. Teresa, the Minims of S. Francis de Paola, the Theatines, and the Jesuits. In 1908, The diocese had a population of 159,500, with 109 parishes, 264 churches and chapels, 200 secular and 16 regular priests, 2 religious houses of men and 5 of women.

=== Diocesan reorganization ===
The Second Vatican Council (1962–1965), in order to ensure that all Catholics received proper spiritual attention, decreed the reorganization of the diocesan structure of Italy and the consolidation of small and struggling dioceses. It also recommended the abolition of anomalous units such as exempt territorial prelatures.

On April 4, 1979, the diocese of Bisignano was separated from the Diocese of San Marco e Bisignano and united with the archdiocese of Cosenza, as Cosenza e Bisignano. The diocese of San Marco was given compensating territory, and named the Diocese of San Marco Argentano-Scalea.

On 18 February 1984, the Vatican and the Italian State signed a new and revised concordat. Based on the revisions, a set of Normae was issued on 15 November 1984, which was accompanied in the next year, on 3 June 1985, by enabling legislation. According to the agreement, the practice of having one bishop govern two separate dioceses at the same time, aeque personaliter, was abolished. Instead, the Vatican continued consultations which had begun under Pope John XXIII for the merging of small dioceses, especially those with personnel and financial problems, into one combined diocese.

On 30 September 1986, Pope John Paul II ordered that the dioceses of Cosenza e Bisignano be merged into one diocese with one bishop, with the Latin title Archidioecesis Cosentina-Bisinianensis. The seat of the diocese was to be in Cosenza, and the cathedral of Cosenza was to serve as the cathedral of the merged dioceses. The cathedral in Bisignano was to become a co-cathedral, and the cathedral Chapter was to be a Capitulum Concathedralis. There was to be only one diocesan Tribunal, in Cosenza, and likewise one seminary, one College of Consultors, and one Priests' Council. The territory of the new diocese was to include the territory of the former dioceses of Cosenza and Bisignano.

Without suffragans, and therefore no longer a metropolitan archdiocese, Cosenza-Bisignano became directly dependent upon the Holy See. This situation changed in 2001, when Pope John Paul II further reformed the diocesan structure of Calabria. On 30 January 2001, he ordered that the metropolitan status of Cosenza-Bisignano be restored, and that it be assigned as suffragans the dioceses of Rossano-Cariata and Cassano, which were removed from the jurisdiction of the archdiocese of Reggio Calabria.

== Minor Basilicas ==
Italy has a total of 589 minor basilicas. In the diocese of Cosenza they are:

- Basilica S. Mariae Virginis "a Catena", Laurignano, diocese of Cosenza (1966)
- Basilica of St. Francis of Paola, city of Paola, diocese of Cosenza (1921)
- Sanctuary-Basilica of the Blessed Angelo of Acri, Bisignano, diocese of Cosenza (1980)

== Bishops of Cosenza ==
Erected: 6th Century
Latin Name: Cosentina

...
[Suera (Suerius)]
...
[Maximus (c. 401–417)]
...

- Palumbus (attested 599)

...

- Julianus (attested 680)

...

- Pelagius (744)

...

- Iselgrinus (attested 920)

...

- Petrus (attested 1056)

== Archbishops of Cosenza ==
=== c. 1150 to 1367 ===
...

- Ruffus (attested 1177–1184)
- Petrus (c.1185)

...

- Bonushomo (c. 1196–1200)
- Andreas (1201–1202)
- Lucas, O.Cist. (attested 1203–1227)
- Opizo de Sulbrico d'Asti (attested 1230–1241)
- P[---] (c. 1241–1252?) Bishop-elect
- Cazacomes Domini Ildibrandini Guidonis ( ? –1252/1254) Bishop-elect
- Bartholomaeus Pignatelli (1254–1266)
- Tommaso Agni da Lentino, O.P. (1267–1272)

Richardus da Benevento (1276) Archbishop-elect

- Beltrandus (1276–1278)
- Petrus da Confluentia, O.P. (1278–1285?)
- Martinus Polonus, O.Cist. (1285?)
- Petrus
- Adam (1290–1295) Archbishop-elect
- Rogerus de Stephanutia (1295–1298)
- Petrus, O.Min. (1298–1319)
- Nicolaus (1320–1330)
- Franciscus (1330–1353)
- Petrus de Galganis (1354–1362)
- Nicolas Caracciolo (1362–1365)
- Cerritanus (1365–1377)

=== 1377 to 1660 ===
- Niccolò Brancaccio (1377–1379 Resigned) Avignon Obedience
- Joannes de Camerino (1379–1383) Avignon Obedience
- Andreas (1383– ? ) Avignon Obedience
- Gregorius (or Georgius) (1382– ? ) Roman Obedience
- Tirello Caracciolo (1388–1412) Roman Obedience
- Francesco Tomacelli (1413–1425)
- Berardus Caracciolo (1425–1452)
- Pyrrhus (Petrus) Caracciolo (1452–1481)

Giovanni d'Aragona (1481–1485) Administrator

- Carlo Domenico del Carretto (24 Apr 1489 –1491)
- Battista Pinelli (10 Oct 1491 – 1495 Died)
- Bartolomeo Flores (5 Aug 1495 – 1497 Resigned)
- Ludovico Agnelli (16 Oct 1497 – 3 Nov 1499 Died)
- Francisco de Borja (6 Nov 1499 – 4 Nov 1511 Died)
- Giovanni Ruffo de Theodoli (6 Nov 1511 – 1527 Died)

Niccolò Gaddi (31 Jan 1528 – 21 Jun 1535 Resigned) Administrator

- Taddeo Gatti (21 Jun 1535 – 22 Dec 1561 Died)
- Francesco Gonzaga (2 Mar 1562 – 12 Jan 1565 Resigned)
- Francesco Milesio (12 Jan 1565 – 10 Jan 1568 Died)
- Flavio Orsini (24 Jan 1569 – 16 Sep 1573 Resigned)
- Andrea Matteo Acquaviva d'Aragona (16 Sep 1573 – 1576 Died)
- Fantino Petrignani (6 Jan 1577 – 1585 Resigned)
- Silvio Passerini (20 May 1585 – 1587 Died)
- Giovanni Evangelista Pallotta (11 Sep 1587 – 5 Apr 1591 Resigned)
- Giovanni Battista Costanzo (5 Apr 1591 – 1617 Died)
- Paolo Emilio Santori (Santorio) (3 Jul 1617 –1623)
- Giulio Antonio Santoro (29 Jan 1624 – 28 Sep 1638 Died)
- Martino Alfieri (11 Apr 1639 – 1641 Died)
- Antonio Ricciulli (27 Nov 1641 – May 1643 Died)
- Alfonso Maurelli (Castiglion Morelli) (31 Aug 1643 – 22 Feb 1649 Died)
- Giuseppe Sanfelice (22 Aug 1650 – 20 Nov 1660 Died)

=== 1660 to 1979 ===
- Gennaro Sanfelice (21 Nov 1661 – 19 Feb 1694 Died)
- Eligio Caracciolo, C.R. (15 Mar 1694 – 17 Oct 1700)
- Andrea Brancaccio, C.R. (18 Apr 1701 – 4 Jun 1725)
- Vincenzo Maria d'Aragona, O.P. (23 Jul 1725 – 18 Apr 1743 Died)
- Francesco Antonio Cavalcanti, C.R. (20 May 1743 – 7 Jan 1748 Died)
- Michele Maria Capece Galeota, C.R. (6 May 1748 –1764)
- Antonio D'Afflitto, C.R. (20 Aug 1764 – 26 Oct 1772 Died)
- Gennaro Clemente Francone (14 Dec 1772 –1792)
- Raffaele Mormile, C.R. (27 Feb 1792 Confirmed –1803)
- Vincenzo Nicola Pasquale Dentice, O.S.B. (1805–1806 Died)

Sede vacante (1806–1818)

Vincenzo Greco, Vicar Capitular

- Domenico Narni Mancinelli (1818–1832)
- Lorenzo Pontillo (20 Jan 1834 Confirmed – 10 Nov 1873 Died)
- Camillo Sorgente (4 May 1874 – 2 Oct 1911 Died)
- Tommaso Trussoni (14 Dec 1912 – 9 Apr 1934 Retired)
- Roberto Nogara (22 Aug 1934 – 24 Apr 1940 Died)
- Aniello Calcara (1 Jul 1940 – 5 Jul 1961 Died)
- Domenico Picchinenna (4 Sep 1961 – 29 May 1971 Appointed, Coadjutor Archbishop of Catania)
- Enea Selis (2 Sep 1971 – 30 Oct 1979 Resigned)

=== Archdiocese of Cosenza e Bisignano ===
Joined 4 April 1979 with the diocese of Bisignano
Latin Name: Cosentina et Bisinianensis

- Dino Trabalzini (18 Mar 1980 – 6 Jun 1998 Retired)

== Archbishops of Cosenza-Bisignano ==
Metropolitan See: 30 January 2001

- Giuseppe Agostino (6 Jun 1998 – 18 Dec 2004 Retired)
- Salvatore Nunnari (18 Dec 2004 – 15 May 2015 Retired)
- Francescantonio Nolè, O.F.M. Conv. (15 May 2015 – 15 September 2022 Died)
- Giovanni Checchinato (10 December 2022 -)

== Bibliography ==
=== Reference works for bishops ===
- Gams, Pius Bonifatius (1873). Series episcoporum Ecclesiae catholicae: quotquot innotuerunt a beato Petro apostolo (in Latin). Ratisbon: Typis et Sumptibus Georgii Josephi Manz. pp. 878–879. (Use with caution; obsolete)
- Eubel, Conradus, ed. (1913). Hierarchia catholica, Tomus 1 (in Latin) (second ed.). Münster: Libreria Regensbergiana.
- Eubel, Conradus, ed. (1914). Hierarchia catholica, Tomus 2 (in Latin) (second ed.). Münster: Libreria Regensbergiana.
- Eubel, Conradus; Gulik, Guilelmus (1923). Hierarchia catholica, Tomus 3 (in Latin) (second ed.). Münster: Libreria Regensbergiana.
- Gauchat, Patritius (Patrice) (1935). Hierarchia catholica (in Latin). Vol. IV (1592-1667). Münster: Libraria Regensbergiana.
- Ritzler, Remigius; Sefrin, Pirminus (1952). Hierarchia catholica medii et recentis aevi V (1667-1730) (in Latin). Patavii: Messagero di S. Antonio.
- Ritzler, Remigius; Sefrin, Pirminus (1958). Hierarchia catholica medii et recentis aevi VI (1730-1799) (in Latin). Patavii: Messagero di S. Antonio.
- Ritzler, Remigius; Sefrin, Pirminus (1968). Hierarchia Catholica medii et recentioris aevi sive summorum pontificum, S. R. E. cardinalium, ecclesiarum antistitum series... A pontificatu Pii PP. VII (1800) usque ad pontificatum Gregorii PP. XVI (1846) (in Latin). Vol. VII. Monasterii: Libr. Regensburgiana.

=== Studies ===
- Andreotti, Davide (1869). Storia dei cosentini. (in Italian). Volume 1. Volume 2. Volume 3. Napoli: S. Marchese 1869, 1869, 1874.
- Cappelletti, Giuseppe (1870). Le chiese d'Italia: dalla loro origine sino ai nostri giorni. (in Italian). Vol. vigesimoprimo (21). Venezia: G. Antonelli. pp. 285–295.
- Kamp, Norbert (1975). Kirche und Monarchie im staufischen Königreich Sizilien: I. Prosopographische Grundlegung, Bistumer und Bistümer und Bischöfe des Konigreichs 1194–1266: 2. Apulien und Calabrien München: Wilhelm Fink 1975. pp. 830–863.
- Kehr, Paulus Fridolin (1975). Italia pontificia. Regesta pontificum Romanorum. (in Latin) Vol. X: Calabria–Insulae. Berlin: Weidmann.
- Lanzoni, Francesco (1927). Le diocesi d'Italia dalle origini al principio del secolo VII (an. 604) (in Italian). Rome: Biblioteca Apostolica Vaticana. p. 343.
- Taccone-Gallucci, Domenico (1902). Regesti dei Romani pontefici della Calabria. (in Latin and Italian) Roma: Tip. Vaticana, 1902. pp. 429–432.
- Torelli, Felice (1848), La chiave del concordato dell'anno 1818. (in Italian and Latin) Vol. I, second edition (Naples: Fibreno 1848)
- Ughelli, Ferdinando; Coleti, Niccolo (1721). Italia Sacra Sive De Episcopis Italiae, Et Insularum adiacentium (in Latin). Vol. Tomus nonus (9). Venice: Antonio Coleti. pp. 183–270.
