= Roman Catholic Diocese of Martirano =

The Diocese of Martirano was a Roman Catholic diocese located in the village and comune of Martirano in the province of Catanzaro in the Calabria region of Italy. It was suppressed in 1818 to the Diocese of Nicastro.

== History ==
Paul Fridolin Kehr draws attention to a group of bishops who are attested between 649 and 769 and identified as bishops of Martirano in the Italia Sacra of Ferdinand Ughelli: Reparatus, Opportunus, Domnus and Bonus. Inspection of the evidence shows that these bishops belonged to the diocese of Manturano in Tuscany, not Martirano in Calabria. Francesco Lanzoni likewise rejects Reparatus as a bishop of Martirano. These bishops cannot be used to argue for an early establishment of the diocese. Ughelli also reports that Arnulphus was a bishop of Martirano, citing William of Tyre's story of his attempting to intrude himself into the Patriarchate of Jerusalem. But William of Tyre does not say that Arnulphus was Bishop of Martirano c. 1100; it is only a conjecture of Ughelli. Ughelli also reports the existence of a Bishop Rodulphus under Pope Calixtus II, but the documents on which the report is based are forgeries.

It is said that the Diocese of Martirano was established in 1099. Louis Duchesne states that Martirano had been a suffragan of Salerno in 1058, and that Martirano may have replaced the Byzantine Greek diocese of Amantea.

In 1638 a major earthquake struck Calabria. At Martirano the death toll was 517, and most of the town was destroyed. The cathedral could not be repaired, and Bishop Cellesio had to begin building a new one.

The Cathedral was served by a Chapter, composed of four dignities (the Dean, the Archdeacon, the Cantor and the Treasurer) and eight Canons. Bishop Pierbenedetti added six chaplains. All were required to be in priestly orders. In 1703 the number of Canons was twelve.

Bishop Marino Pierbenedetti (1577–1591) was also responsible for the building of the seminary in Martirano, in accordance with the decrees of the Council of Trent and the active encouragement of Bishop Gaspare del Fosso, Archbishop of Reggio and Metropolitan of Calabria.

On 27 June 1818 the diocese of Martirano was suppressed and its territory was added to that of the Diocese of Nicastro, in accordance with the Bull In ultilori of Pope Pius VII. This was in conformity with the Concordat of 1818, between the Holy See and the Kingdom of the Two Sicilies.

In 1968 the title "Bishop of Martirano", though not the institution of a diocese, was restored in the Titular Episcopal See of Martirano. It was used for auxiliary bishops in Brazil and the Philippines, but it is currently held by the President of the Pontifical Committee for International Eucharistic Congresses, Archbishop (personal title) Piero Marini, who had once been Master of Pontifical Liturgical Celebrations for John Paul II and Benedict XVI.

== Bishops of Martirano ==
=== to 1400 ===
...

- Michael (attested 1177, 1179)
- Philippus de Matera (attested 1205 – 1238)
- Thomas, O.Cist. (attested 1254)
- Raynaldus (1 February 1255 – ? )
- Robertus (c. 1266 – 4 June 1288)
- Adam (attested c. 1295 – 1330)
- Hugo (attested 1330)
- Senator de Marturano (1340 – 1349)
- Joannes de Bisignano (18 May 1349 – )
- Jacobus de Itro (22 March 1359 – )
- Jacobus Castellani, O.Min. (8 January 1364 – 2 April 1390)
- Nicolaus ( 1390 )
- Jacobus de Villani (4 March 1400 – )
- Nicolaus (restored) (17 June 1400 – )
- Petrus
- Antonius Stamingo, O.Min. (2 April 1418 – 1440)

=== 1400 to 1600 ===
Carlo of Naples (refused appointment)

- Godfridus de Cola (4 May 1442 – 11 February 1446)
- Antonio Cola (11 February 1446 – 1451)
- Martinus (28 May 1451 – May 1463)
- Angelo Greco (26 May 1463 – 1475 Died)
- Aurelio Biennato (21 Nov 1485 – 1496 Died)
- Angelo Pappacoda (9 Jan 1497 – 1537 Died)
- Giacomo Antonio Ferduzi, O.F.M. Conv. (27 Jun 1537 – 1560 Died)
- Tolomeo Gallio (13 Sep 1560 – 6 Jul 1562)
- Girolamo Federici (6 Jul 1562 – 1569 Resigned)
- Gregorio Cruz, O.P. (1 Apr 1569 – 1577 Died)
- Mariano Pierbenedetti (30 Jan 1577 – before 5 Apr 1591 Resigned)
- Roberto Phili (5 April 1591 – 1592)

=== 1600 to 1818 ===
- Francesco Monaco (26 Jul 1592 – Dec 1626 Died)
- Luca Cellesi (5 Jul 1627 – Jul 1661 Died)
- Felice Antonio Monaco (21 Nov 1661 – Jan 1667 Died)
- Giovanni Giacomo Palamolla (16 Mar 1667 – Nov 1692 Died)
- Michelangelo Veraldi (9 Mar 1693 – Nov 1702 Died)
- Nicolaus Righetti (19 Feb 1703 – Mar 1711 Died)
- Pietro Antonio Pietrasanta, B. (14 Mar 1718 – Oct 1727 Died)
- Saverio Ferrari (26 Nov 1727 – 29 Apr 1733 Died)
- Nicolò Carmine Falcone (22 Jun 1733 – 15 Jul 1743)
- Bernardino Antonio Diego Bernardi, O.M. (16 Dec 1743 – 14 May 1758 Died)
- Nicola Spedalieri (18 Dec 1758 – 29 Jan 1770)
- Giacomo Maria de Tarsia, O.M. (12 Mar 1770 – 1782 Died)
- Francesco Antonio Grillo, O.F.M. Conv. (26 Mar 1792 Confirmed – 29 Oct 1804)

1818 June 27: Suppressed. See: Diocese of Nicastro

== Books ==
=== References ===
- Eubel, Conradus, ed. (1913). Hierarchia catholica, Tomus 1 (second ed.). Münster: Libreria Regensbergiana. (in Latin)
- Eubel, Conradus, ed. (1914). Hierarchia catholica, Tomus 2 (second ed.). Münster: Libreria Regensbergiana.
- Gulik, Guilelmus (1923). Eubel, Conradus (ed.). Hierarchia catholica, Tomus 3 (second ed.). Münster: Libreria Regensbergiana.
- Gams, Pius Bonifatius (1873). Series episcoporum Ecclesiae catholicae: quotquot innotuerunt a beato Petro apostolo (in Latin). Ratisbon: Typis et Sumptibus Georgii Josephi Manz.
- Gauchat, Patritius (Patrice) (1935). Hierarchia catholica IV (1592-1667). Münster: Libraria Regensbergiana.
- Ritzler, Remigius; Sefrin, Pirminus (1968). Hierarchia Catholica medii et recentioris aevi sive summorum pontificum, S. R. E. cardinalium, ecclesiarum antistitum series... A pontificatu Pii PP. VII (1800) usque ad pontificatum Gregorii PP. XVI (1846) (in Latin). Vol. VII. Monasterii: Libr. Regensburgiana.

=== Studies ===
- Avino, Vincenzio d' (1848). Cenni storici sulle chiese arcivescovili, vescovili, e prelatizie (nullius) del regno delle due Sicilie (in Italian). Naples: dalle stampe di Ranucci. pp. 466–470. (article by Cav. Francesco Adilardi)
- Cappelletti, Giuseppe (1864). Le chiese d'Italia: dalla loro origine sino ai nostri giorni (in Italian). Vol. Tomo decimonono (19). Venice: G. Antonelli.
- Duchesne, Louis (1902), "Les évèchés de Calabre," Mélanges Paul Fabre: études d'histoire du moyen âge (in French). Paris: A. Picard et fils. 1902. pp. 1–16.
- Kamp, Norbert (1975). Kirche und Monarchie im staufischen Königreich Sizilien: I. Prosopographische Grundlegung, Bistumer und Bistümer und Bischöfe des Konigreichs 1194–1266: 2. Apulien und Calabrien München: Wilhelm Fink 1975.
- Kehr, Paulus Fridolin (1975). Italia pontificia. Regesta pontificum Romanorum. Vol. X: Calabria–Insulae. Berlin: Weidmann. (in Latin)
- Taccone-Gallucci, Domenico (1902). Regesti dei Romani pontefici della Calabria (in Italian). Rome: Tip. Vaticana. p. 402.
- Ughelli, Ferdinando; Coleti, Niccolo (1721). Italia Sacra Sive De Episcopis Italiae, Et Insularum adiacentium (in Latin). Vol. Tomus nonus (9). Venice: Antonio Coleti. pp. 270–285.

== See also ==
- Catholic Church in Italy
