= Corrado Lorefice =

Italian prelate of the Catholic Church (born 1962)

The Most Reverend Corrado Lorefice
- Archbishop of Palermo
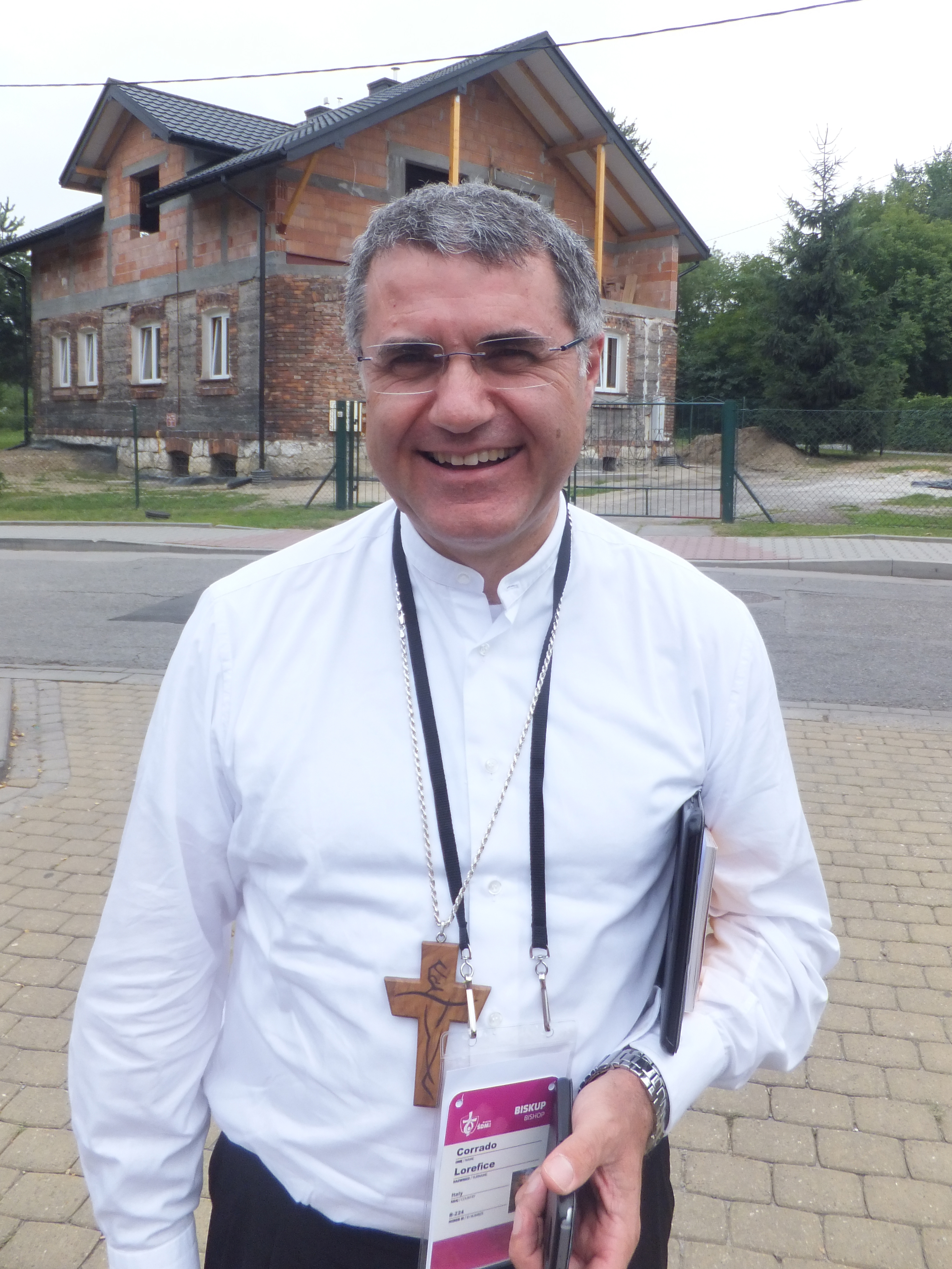
- Father Corrado, during the World Youth Day 2016
- Church: Roman Catholic Church
- Archdiocese: Palermo
- Metropolis: Palermo
- See: Palermo
- Appointed: 27 October 2015
- Installed: 5 December 2015
- Predecessor: Paolo Romeo

Orders
- Ordination: 30 December 1987 by Salvatore Nicolosi
- Consecration: 5 December 2015 by Paolo Romeo

Personal details
- Born: Corrado Lorefice; 12 October 1962 (age 63) Ispica, Sicily, Italy
- Denomination: Roman Catholic
- Motto: Latin: Exemplum dedi vobis
- Coat of arms

Styles of Corrado Lorefice
- Reference style: The Most Reverend
- Spoken style: Your Excellency
- Religious style: Monsignor

Corrado Lorefice (born 12 October 1962) is an Italian prelate of the Catholic Church. He has been the Archbishop of Palermo since 5 December 2015.

== Biography ==
He was born on 12 October 1962 in Ispica, in the Province of Ragusa, Italy.

He was ordained a deacon on 26 September 1986 in Noto Cathedral by Bishop Salvatore Nicolosi, who ordained him as a priest of the Diocese of Noto on 30 December 1987 in the church of Santissima Annunziata in Ispica.

He has been an activist in opposing the Mafia and on behalf of the victims of human trafficking and prostitution. He has written favorable assessments of liberation theology.

Pope Francis appointed him Archbishop of Palermo on 27 October 2015. On 5 December he was consecrated a bishop by Cardinal Paolo Romeo, emeritus Archbishop of Palermo, and installed there.

In June 2017 he was recognized by the Raoul Wallenberg Foundation for donating a chapel to serve as a synagogue for the Jewish community of Naples, dormant for centuries but struggling to revive.

== Publications ==
- Gettate le reti: itinerario parrocchiale di preghiera per le vocazioni (Milan: Edizioni Paoline, 2004), ISBN 88-315-2602-2
- Dossetti e Lercaro: la Chiesa povera e dei poveri nella prospettiva del Concilio Vaticano II (Milan: Edizioni Paoline, 2011), ISBN 978-88-315-4003-2
- La compagnia del Vangelo: discorsi e idee di don Pino Puglisi a Palermo (Reggio Emilia: San Lorenzo, 2014), ISBN 978-88-8071-228-2

== See also ==
Catholic Church titles
Preceded by Paolo Romeo	Archbishop of Palermo; 2015-present	Succeeded by -
