= Conrad of Piacenza =

Christian saint

Saint Conrad Confalonieri of Piacenza TOSF
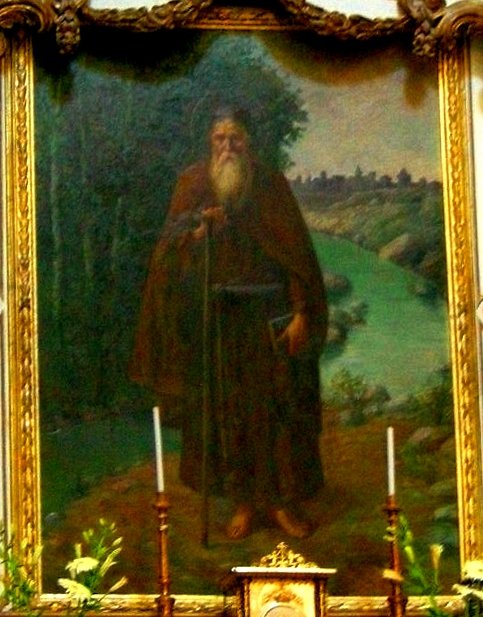

Confessor
- Born: 1290; Commune of Calendasco, Holy Roman Empire
- Died: 19 February 1351; Netum, Kingdom of Sicily
- Venerated in: Roman Catholic Church
- Beatified: 12 July 1515, Rome, Papal States by Pope Leo X
- Canonized: 2 June 1625, Piacenza, Duchy of Parma and Piacenza, Holy Roman Empire, by Pope Urban VIII
- Major shrine: Cathedral of St. Nicholas, Noto, Province of Syracuse, Italy
- Feast: 19 February

Conrad Confalonieri of Piacenza, TOSF (Italian: Corrado, 1290 [or 1284] (in Italian) – 19 February 1351), was an Italian hermit of the Third Order of St. Francis, who is venerated as a saint.

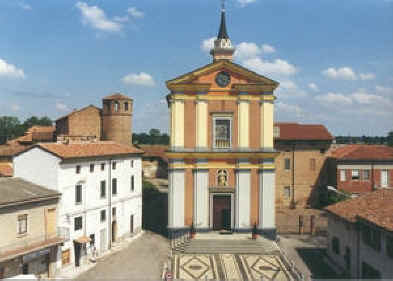
The Church of Calendasco with the castle where St. Conrad was born in the background (left)

== Biography ==
Little is known of Conrad's life. He seems to have been born Corrado Confalonieri, into one of the foremost families of Piacenza, in Calendasco, a fiefdom of his family, who owned the Castle of Calendasco. His date of birth is uncertain. He apparently married an aristocratic young lady, Ephrosyne, when he too was quite young.

There is no question that Conrad was a Franciscan tertiary. The new Roman Martyrology acknowledges his forty years as a hermit, and a life marked by prayer and acts of penance.

== Veneration ==
Pope Leo X beatified Conrad on 12 July 1515, and sanctioned his feast day being celebrated in Netum. On 30 October 1544, Pope Paul III extended permission to the whole island. On 2 June 1625, he was canonised by Cardinal Odoardo Farnese, who was the Duke of Parma and Piacenza. This was at a solemn ceremony at Piacenza Cathedral, where his feast day was declared obligatory.

On 12 September 1625, Pope Urban VIII allowed the Franciscans to use dedicated propers for the Divine Office and Mass on the saint’s feast day. Nowadays, this particular liturgical form is limited to the Franciscan tertiaries, to which Conrad had belonged.

On his feast day, the parish church of San Corrado in Noto celebrates him by the distributing blessed bread.

== Legend ==
During Conrad’s beatification process, a widespread narrative for which an acceptable historical basis had yet to surface. It is suggested that one day, Conrad had been out hunting within his family's domain, as was his custom. To flush out some game, he had ordered some brushwood be set alight. The prevailing wind, it is said, caused the flames to spread rapidly to surrounding fields and forest. A peasant discovered near where the fire is alleged to have begun was accused of starting the blaze, then imprisoned, tortured to confess, and condemned to death. As the innocent man was being led to his execution, a remorseful Conrad publicly admitted his fault to the Signoria of the city. As punishment and reparation for the devastation he had caused, the Signoria supposedly seized all his assets, sparing his life only because of his noble birth. Thus, reduced to poverty, and seeking penance for his act of cowardice, Conrad and his wife had apparently seen the hand of God in the turn of events.

In this story, the couple duly separated in 1315. Conrad is said to have retired to a hermitage near the town of Calendasco, joining a community of hermits, Franciscan tertiaries. His wife had meanwhile apparently become a Poor Clare in the city. Conrad had soon developed a reputation for holiness, and the flow of visitors had left him unable to keep the solitude he had sought. He is said to have departed as a pilgrim, going to Rome, and from there to the Holy Land and Malta. The legend continues that in about 1340, he had been in Palermo in Sicily, directed to an isolated site in the Val di Noto. After many years as an itinerant, he is said to have settled there in a grotto now named after him. He had adopted a most austere and penitential life of solitude. He was credited with numerous miracles, and is alleged to have had the gift of prophecy.

The tale relates that in 1343, Conrad had felt called by God to serve the local people more directly and had gone to the town of Netum (after earthquakes levelled it in the 1690s, it was abandoned in 1703 and the inhabitants founded Noto). For the next two years, Conrad is said to have cared for the sick at the Hospital of Saint Martin in Netum. He had lived in a hermitage attached to the Church of the Crucified Christ. At that time, apparently, the hermitage had also been occupied by Blessed William Buccheri, a former equerry to King Frederick III of Sicily said to have also taken up a life of solitude and prayer. Tradition has it from time to time, Conrad would return to his grotto for silent prayer. His fame had been such that by 1348 the Bishop of Syracuse, Giacomo Guidone de Franchis, had visited Conrad at his hermitage, requesting his prayers to end a famine afflicting Sicily.

Conrad died on 19 February 1351. It is said that he had foreseen this, and had died while in prayer kneeling before a crucifix. He was buried at the principal church in Netum. When the town was abandoned, his remains were translated to Saint Nicholas’ Cathedral.

With a reputation for miracles, Conrad continues to be invoked particularly for the relief of hernia. One supposedly contemporaneous account was of a visit to his hermitage by an old friend and companion-in-arms, Antonio da Stessa, from Daverio. Apparently, his friend had been suffering pain from a hernia. Conrad is said to have been moved to pity and had prayed for him, whereupon da Stessa had seemed to have been instantly cured. A similar cure supposedly happened to a local tailor, who had suffered severely from several hernias.

Conrad is associated with claims of a Miracle of the Bread. The setting is of the aforementioned famine that had hit Sicily after a severe outbreak of the bubonic plague, 1348–49. Anyone who had reportedly been seeking the hermit's help had been given a loaf of still-warm bread, supposedly from angels.

The large number of miracles attributed to him is said to have prompted the city's leadership after his death, to petition the Bishop of Syracuse overseeing Noto, to begin the cause for his canonisation. In 1485, after the wait required by canon law, canonisation proceedings were initiated by Bishop Dalmazio Gabriele, O.P., who was himself to testify having witnessed the Miracle of the Bread. As part of the process, Conrad's body was exhumed for examination. It was reported to be incorrupt, and enshrined in a silver casing for public veneration.
