= Episcopal Conference of Sicily =

Assembly of Catholic bishops

The Sicilian bishops' conference (Italian: Conferenza Episcopale Siciliana, CESI) is a group of Bishops of the Roman Catholic Church in Sicily. These are the bishops of the 17 dioceses of the Church belong to the 5 provinces of the Church of Sicily, and the Eparch Piana degli Albanesi. The Sicilian bishops' conference is a part of the Italian Episcopal Conference. Some bishops who are in the Sicilian bishops 'conference delegates certain responsibilities belong to the Italian Bishops' Conference of the respective commissions.

== Organization ==
The Sicilian bishops' conference includes the following:

Cardinal Paolo Romeo, Archbishop of Palermo, president of CESI

Archbishop Salvatore Gristina of Catania, Vice President of CESI

Carmelo Cuttitta, Auxiliary Bishop of Palermo and Secretary of CESI

Francesco Montenegro, Archbishop of Agrigento and Delegate for Charity and Health

Salvatore Pappalardo, Archbishop of Siracusa (Syracuse), Delegate for the Liturgy

Calogero La Piana, Archbishop of Messina and Delegate for Migration

Salvatore Di Cristina, Archbishop of Monreale and Delegate for Culture and Social Communication

Pio Vittorio Vigo, Bishop of Acireale and Delegate for Consecrated Life

Mario Russotto, Bishop of Caltanissetta and Delegate for Family and Youth

Calogero Peri, Bishop of Caltagirone

Vincenzo Manzella, Bishop of Cefalù and Delegate of Social Affairs, Labour, Law and Peace

Domenico Mogavero Bishop of Mazara del Vallo and delegate for economic receipt of the church, religious buildings and cultural assets

Salvatore Muratore, Bishop of Nicosia and delegate for religious education and catechesis

Antonio Stagliano, Bishop of Noto

Ignazio Zambito, Bishop of Patti and Delegate to missionary cooperation between the churches

Sotir Ferrara, Eparch of Piana degli Albanesi and Delegate for Ecumenism and Inter-Religious Dialogue

Michele Pennisi, Bishop of Piazza Armerina and Delegate for Catholic Education, School and University

Paolo Urso, Bishop of Ragusa and Delegate for clergy, seminars and Appeals

Francesco Trapani, CEO of Bishop Miccichè for leisure, tourism and sport

Philip Sarullo, Assistant Secretary
