= Crociata =

Crociata is a surname. Notable people with the surname include:

- Giovanni Crociata (born 1997), Italian footballer
- Mariano Crociata (born 1953), Italian Roman Catholic bishop

== Places ==
=== Italy ===
- Crociata (Slovene: Križpot), a hamlet of the municipality of Dolina
