= Noto Cathedral =

Coordinates: 36°53′29.76″N 15°4′15.53″E

- Minor Basilica of St. Nicholas of Myra
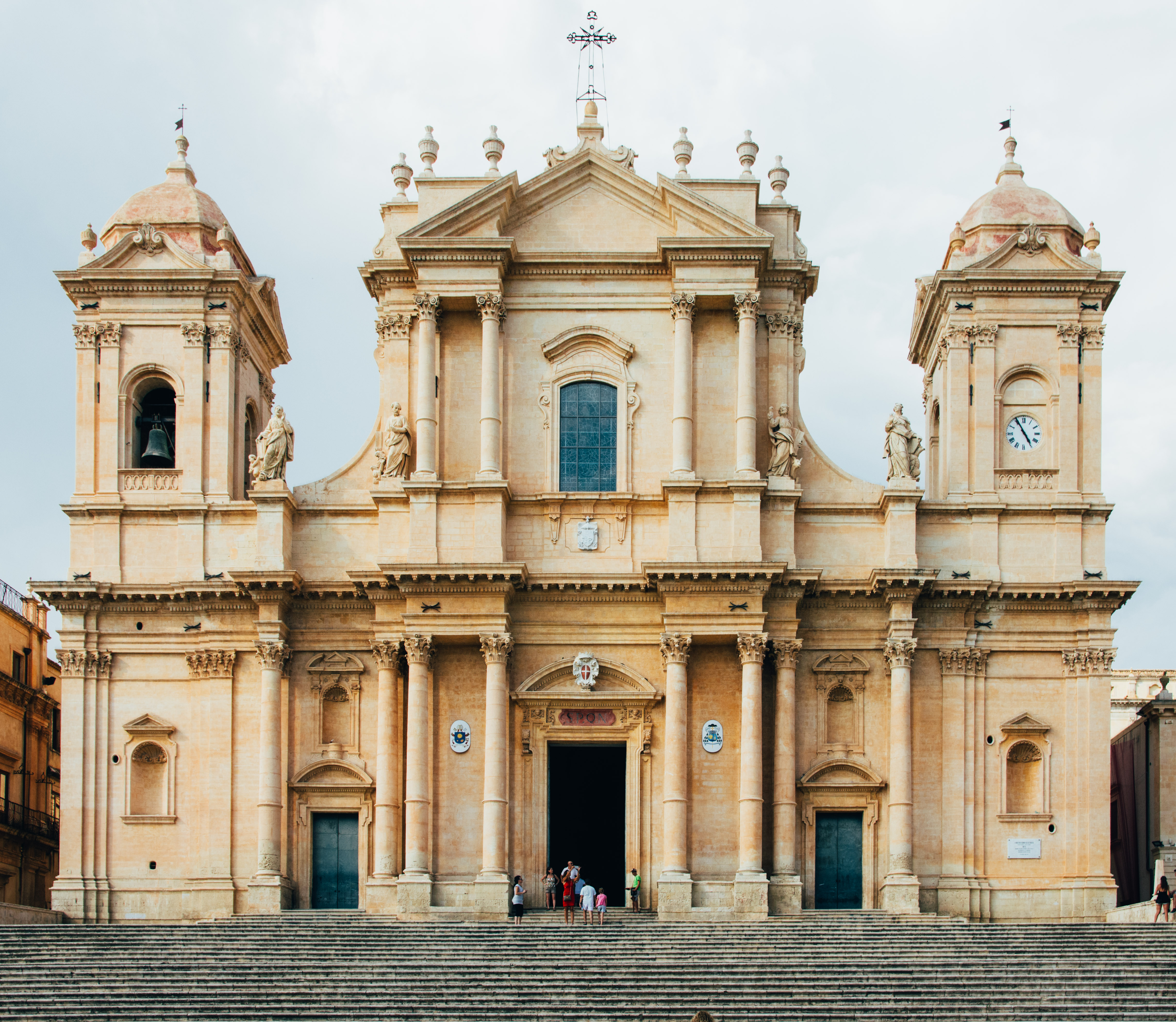
- Cathedral façade, 2018
- Noto Cathedral
- Location: Noto, Sicily
- Country: Italy
- Denomination: Roman Catholic
- Website: www.cattedralenoto.it

History
- Status: Cathedral

Architecture
- Functional status: Active
- Architectural type: Sicilian Baroque
- Completed: 1776

Administration
- Diocese: Diocese of Noto

Noto Cathedral (Italian: Cattedrale di Noto; La Chiesa Madre di San Nicolò) is a Roman Catholic cathedral in Noto in Sicily, Italy. Its construction, in the style of the Sicilian Baroque, began in the early 18th century and was completed in 1776. It is dedicated to Saint Nicholas of Myra, and has been the cathedral of the Diocese of Noto since the diocese's establishment in 1844.

The cathedral dome collapsed in 1996 as a result of unremedied structural weakening caused by an earthquake in 1990, to which injudicious building alterations in the 1950s may have contributed. It has since been rebuilt, and was reopened in 2007.

== History ==
Construction of the Church of St Nicholas began in the early 18th century, as part of the general reconstruction in Sicily following the devastating earthquake of 1693.

The long interval between the beginning of the building, to designs by Rosario Gagliardi, and its completion in 1776 under the supervision of Bernardo Labisi, probably accounts for various peculiarities and inconsistencies of design, and the introduction of Neo-Classical elements. Moreover, the principal doorways are revivals of 15th-century architecture, based on the style of Vignola or Domenico Fontana. The large central window of the west front, with its "ears" and curvilinear tympanum borrows from the repertoire of Andrea Pozzo and resembles work elsewhere in Noto by Francesco Paolo Labisi (for example, the Chiesa del Carmine).

The façade, the composition of which is comparable to those of the church of Notre-Dame, Versailles, and the pre-revolutionary church of Saint-Roch in Paris, was started in late 1767 (the nearby campanile bears the date 1768) to designs of about 1740 by Gagliardi.

In the 19th century the dome had to be reconstructed twice, ending up as a Neo-Classical construction, after collapses caused by earthquakes. In the 1950s much refurbishment was carried out, not entirely successfully, for example the trompe-l'œil of the vertical elements and the tempera decoration of the vaults by the painters Arduino and Baldinelli, as well as major alterations to the high altar and the organ. Most serious however was the replacement of the original pitched roof of the nave by a heavy loft of Roman brick and concrete which was probably one of the causes of the collapse of 1996.

== Collapse ==
On March 13, 1996, a large part of the cathedral collapsed: four of the piers of the southern side of the nave, one of the four piers supporting the dome, the entire roof and vault of the nave, three quarters of the drum and the dome with the lantern, the roof of the south arm of the transept, with many of the cupolas and much of the roof of the right aisle.

The reconstruction was a complex process. Analysis of the debris and the remaining structure made clear how complicated its building history had been, because of the repeated repairs, in a great variety of materials, made necessary by earlier earthquake damage, and also because not all the repairs had been well executed. The task was made all the more onerous by the importance and high visibility of the cathedral in the city of Noto, the so-called capital of Sicilian Baroque architecture.

=== Reopening and after ===
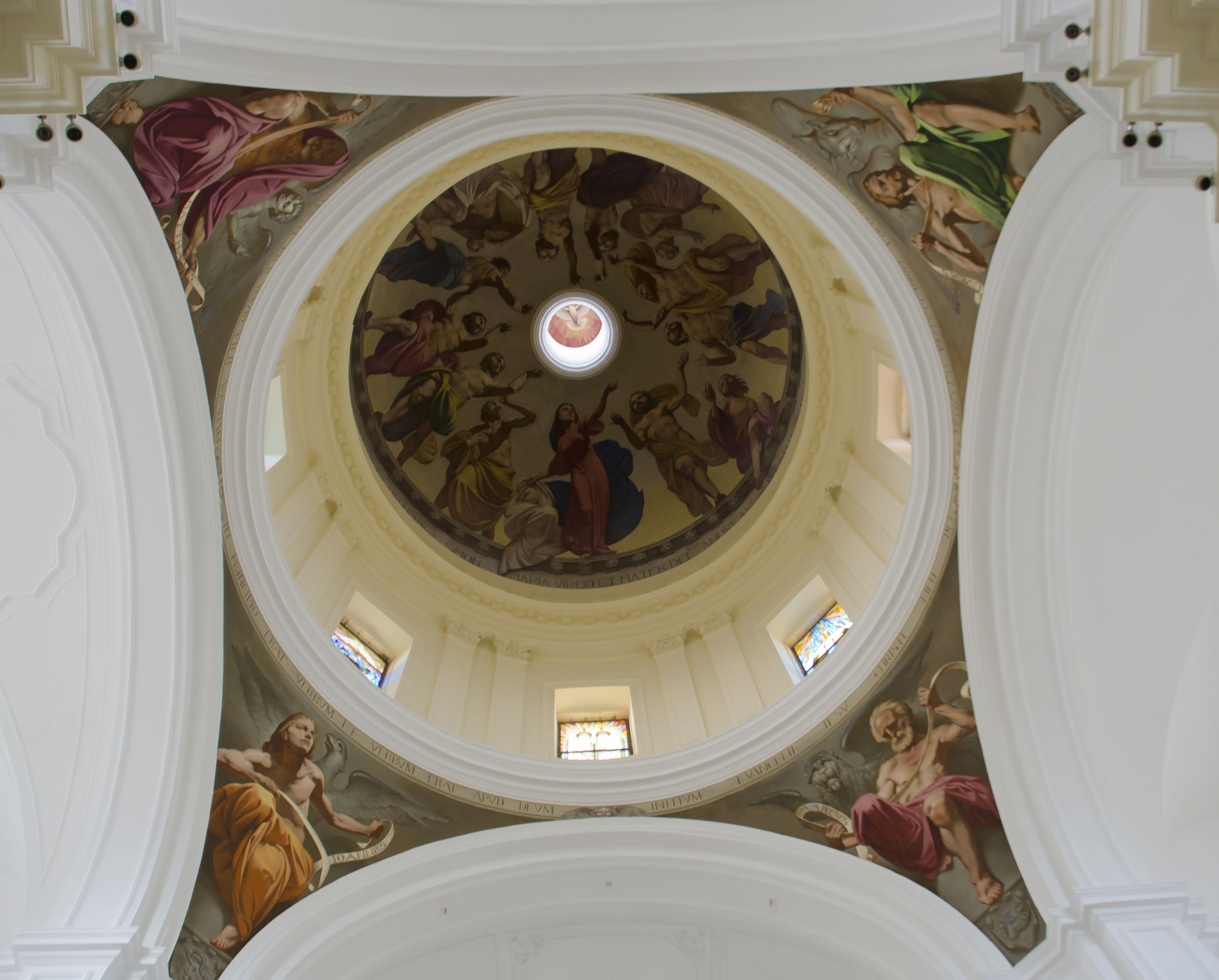
Newly painted cupola

The grand reopening of Noto Cathedral was celebrated by Bishop Giuseppe Malandrino of Noto on June 15, 2007, 11 years after the collapse.

Since then, work on the interior decorations and furnishings of the cathedral has continued. The new high altar, lectern, crucifix and organ were all consecrated by Bishop Antonio Staglianò on January 13, 2011, at a ceremony attended by the head of the Civil Protection Department, Francesco Gabrielli, and the highest regional and local authorities, including the Minister for the Environment, Stefania Prestigiacomo, and the Emergency Commissioner for Reconstruction, the Prefect of Siracusa, Carmela Floreno Vacirca.

The new altar, lectern and crucifix were made of silvered bronze and Sicilian jasper by the Italian sculptor, Giuseppe Ducrot. As a major part of the ceremony, the frescos in the cupola and pendentives by the Russian painter, Oleg Supereko, were also revealed, as well as the eight new windows in the cupola by Francesco Mori.

== The Structure ==
=== Exterior ===
The Baroque façade, with the bell in the left tower and the clock in the right

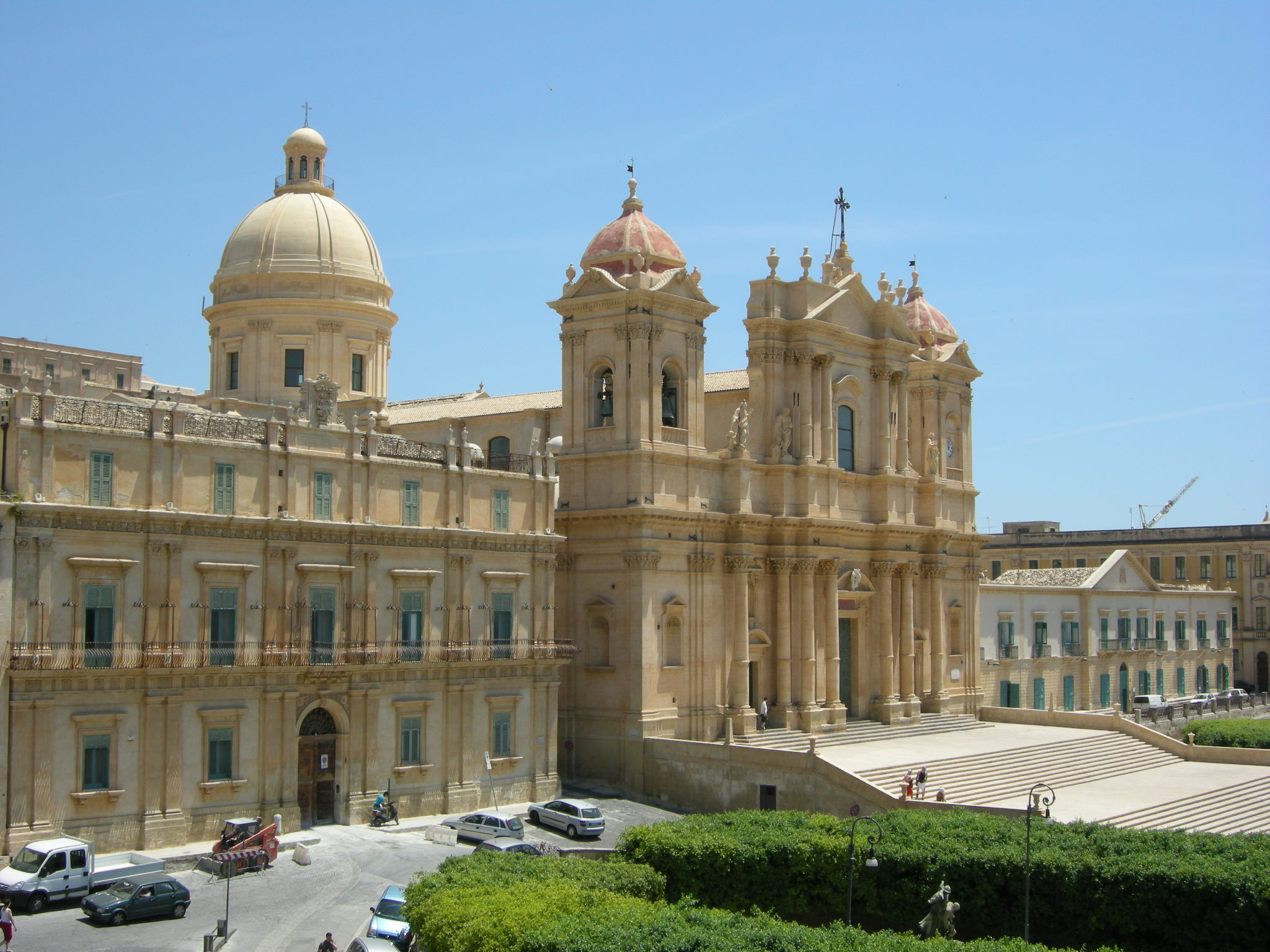
Exterior, showing the central dome

The exterior is of pale yellow limestone, in the Sicilian Baroque style. In front of the cathedral are four statues of saints on pillars. On the left tower is mounted the church bell, and on the right tower a clock. In the central tower, there is a large window. There are also three doors. Over the crossing is the large central dome.

=== Interior ===
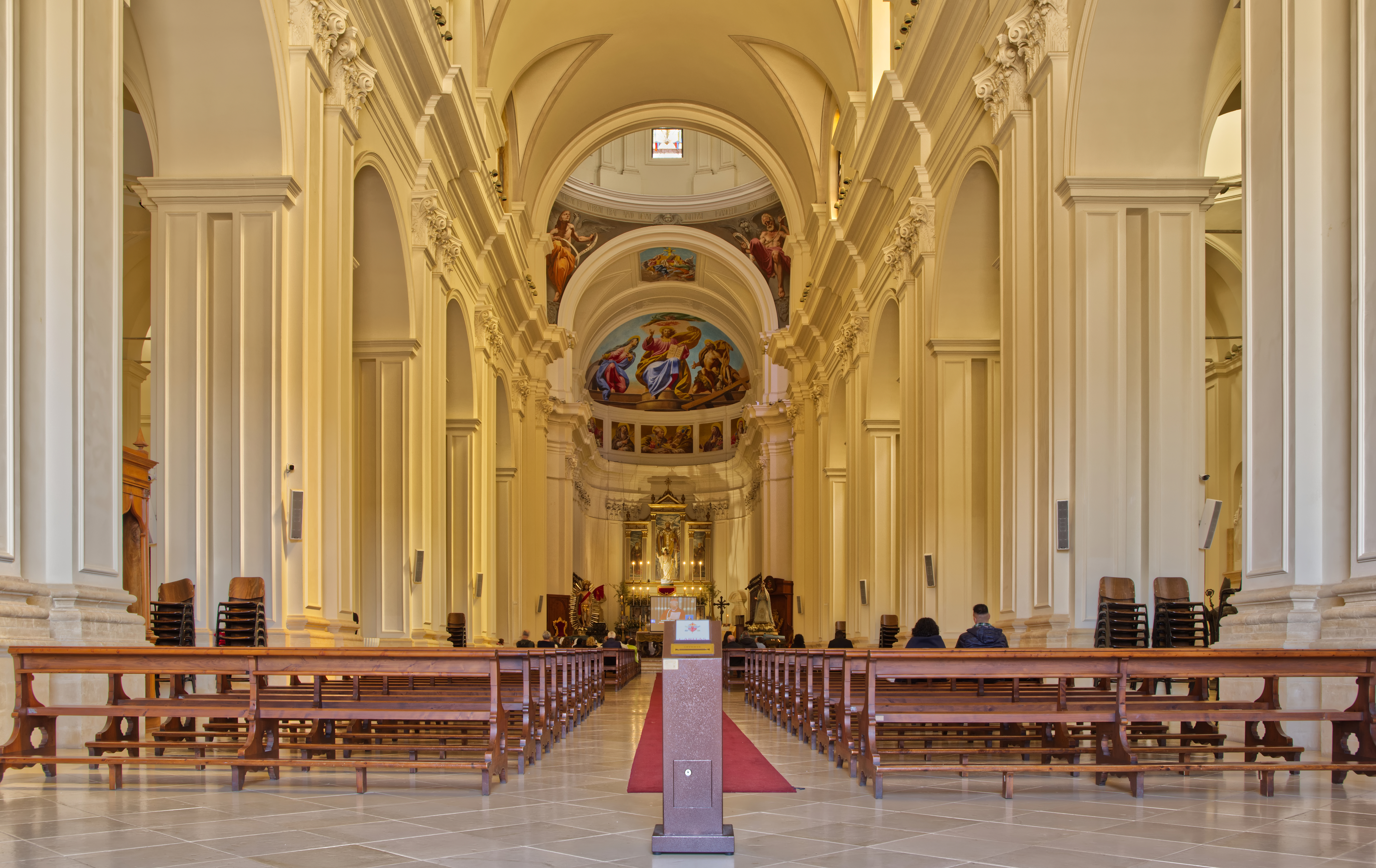
Interior

The interior is now simply painted white, as the 18th century interior decoration was destroyed in the collapse. The principal features and furnishings are those consecrated on 13 January 2011, as above.

The cathedral houses, in a silver urn, the relics of Saint Corrado Confalonieri, patron saint of the city of Noto.

== Sources ==
- Reconstruction of Noto Cathedral - architectural website (in Italian)
- Noto Cathedral official website (in Italian)
- Museo di Palazzo Grimani (in Italian)
