= Ispica =

Ispica Asvestocàminos (Greek)
- Comune
- Comune di Ispica
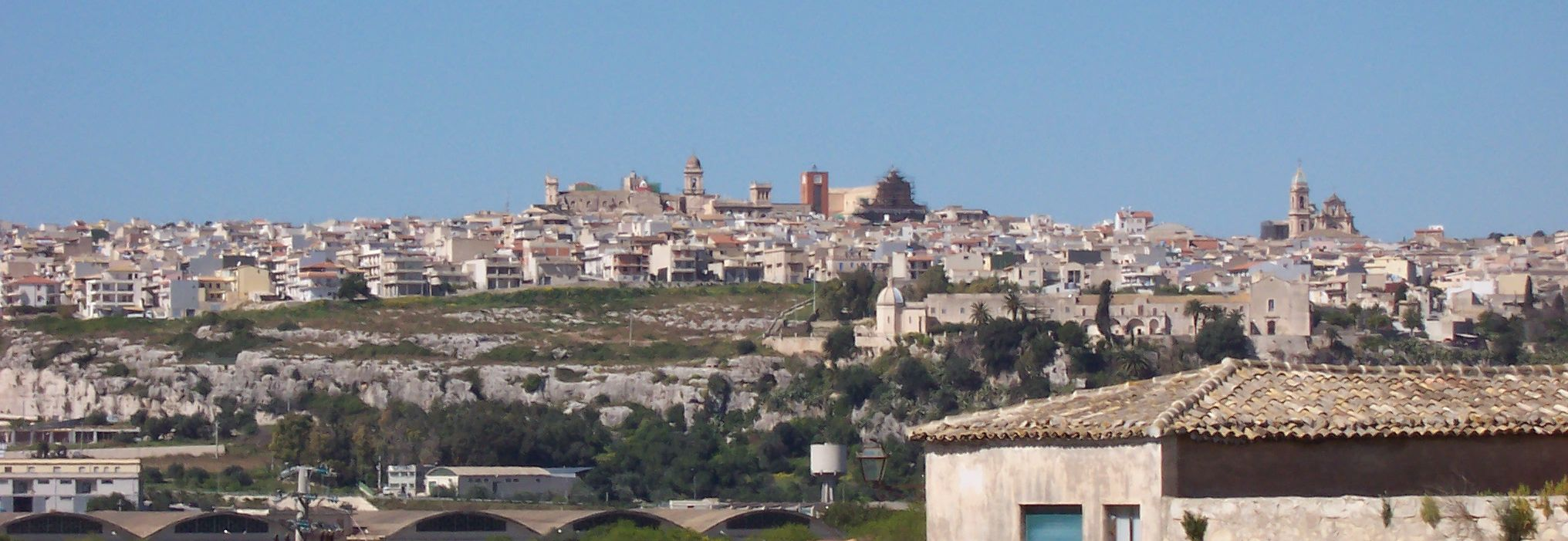

- Coat of arms

- Location within Italy Location within Sicily
- Coordinates: 36°47′N 14°54′E
- Country: Italy
- Region: Sicily
- Province: Ragusa (RG)
- Frazioni: Santa Maria del Focallo, Marina Marza

Government
  - Mayor: Innocenzo Leontini

Area
  - Total: 100 km^{2} (39 sq mi)
- Elevation: 170 m (560 ft)

Population (31 August 2017)
  - Total: 16,302
  - Density: 160/km^{2} (420/sq mi)
- Demonym: Ispicesi
- Time zone: UTC+1 (CET)
  - Summer (DST): UTC+2 (CEST)
- Postal code: I-97014
- Dialing code: +390932
- Patron saint: SS. Maria vergine del monte Carmelo
- Website: Official website

Ispica (Sicilian: Spaccafurnu, Latin: Hyspicae Fundus) is a city and comune in the south of Sicily, Italy. It is 30 kilometres (19 mi) from Ragusa, 50 kilometres (31 mi) from Syracuse, and 90 kilometres (56 mi) away from Valletta, on the coast of Malta. The first mention in a document of Ispica occurred in 1093, in a list of churches and ecclesiastic departments for administrative purposes, but the territory has been colonized since the Bronze Age.

The 16th century St. Francis monastery in Ispica precedes the Baroque architectural period

The city is located on a hill. The main economical activity consists of farming and organic products, especially carrot, zucchini, tomatoes, olives, vineyards. Ispica is the largest producer of organic carrot in southern Italy with about 18,000 tons of annual production.

The town also hosts examples of Sicilian Baroque architecture such as the Vincenzo Sinatra's Basilica di Santa Maria Maggiore, the Annunziata Church, the Carmine monastery, and the St. Barthelemy cathedral.

Ispica was destroyed by the 1693 Sicily earthquake and rebuilt on its present site.

== Tourist Information ==
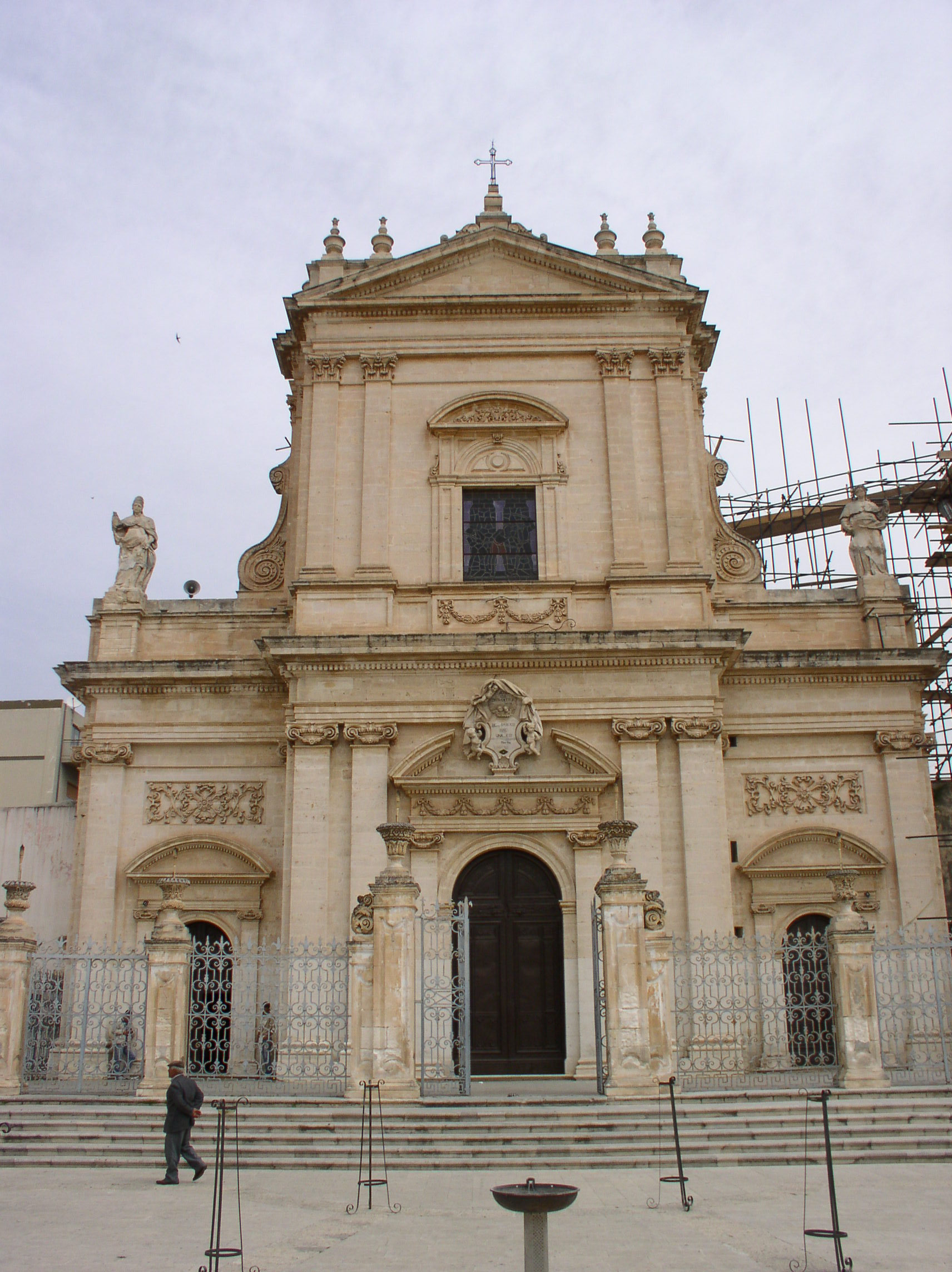
Vincenzo Sinatra's Basilica di Santa Maria Maggiore

The Pro Loco Spaccaforno manages a tourist information point in the city center. Tourist information, also in English, is available on the website Visit Ispica. There are a number of processions which take place on Holy Thursday. If traveling to Ispica, the bus station is in a much safer and more convenient location than the train station, which is located on the outskirts of town.

The Cava d'Ispica (Cave of Ispica) consists of a series of housing units.

== Cava d'Ispica ==
The Cava d'Ispica (Cave of Ispica) consists of a series of housing units carved in rocky formations. Built prior to the Greek colonization, these houses were used until the end of the nineteenth century. This cave, the most important in Eastern Sicily, is 13 kilometres (8 mi) long and is divided among two other comunes, Modica and Rosolini.

== People ==
- Corrado Lorefice, (1962) archbishop of Palermo

== Sources ==
- Trigilia, Melchiorre (1989). Storia e guida di Ispica. So.Ge.Me Editore.
