= Cava d'Ispica =

Nature reserve and archaeological site in Sicily, Italy

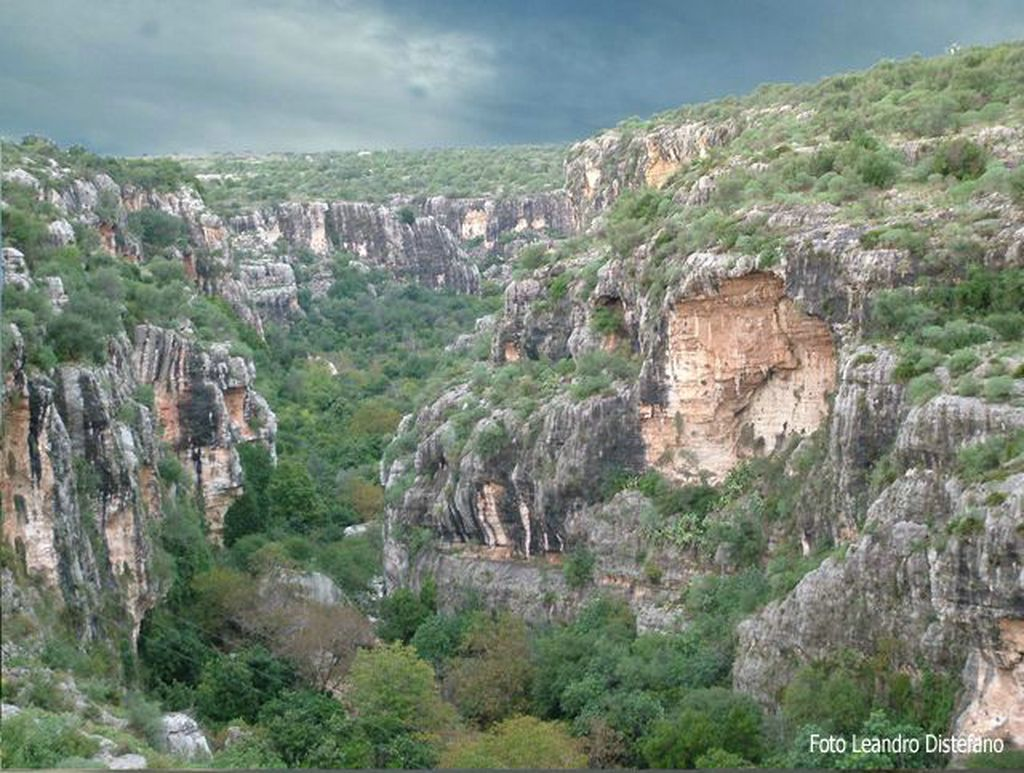
- Cava d'Ispica from above
- Interactive map of Cava d'Ispica
- Type: necropolis
- Periods: Bronze Age
- Location: Modica, Italy; Ispica, Italy

Site notes
- Public access: Yes

Cava d'Ispica (English: Cave of Ispica) is a nature reserve and archaeological site located between the towns of Modica and Ispica, in the southeastern part of Sicily, Italy.

== Description ==
The valley extends for about 13 km (8 mi) and is home to a variety of flora and fauna, as well as numerous caves, gorges, and rock formations that have been eroded by the river that runs through it.

The reserve also contains a number of important archaeological sites, as it was used as habitations and burial site since the 14th century BC.

== Bibliography ==
- Trigilia, Melchiorre (2011). La Cava d'Ispica. Archeologia, storia e guida (in Italian). Ispica: TC. ISBN 1658558529.
