= Mariano Crociata =

Italian Catholic bishop (born 1953)

The Most Reverend Mariano Crociata
- Bishop of Latina-Terracina-Sezze-Priverno
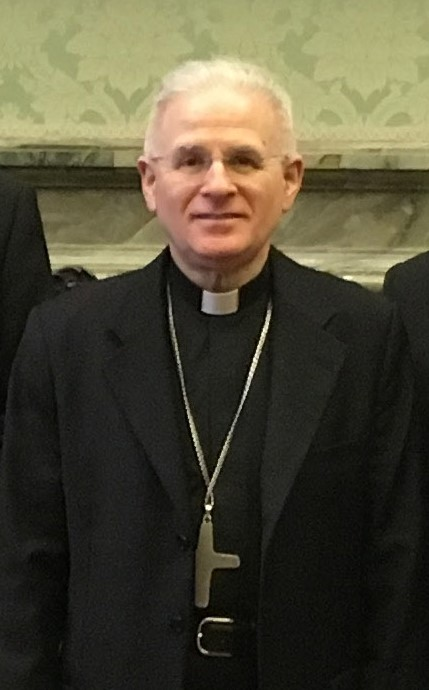
- Church: Roman Catholic Church
- Diocese: Latina-Terracina-Sezze-Priverno
- See: Latina-Terracina-Sezze-Priverno
- Appointed: 19 November 2013
- Installed: 15 December 2013
- Predecessor: Giuseppe Petrocchi
- Other post: President of the Commission of the Bishops' Conferences of the European Community (2023-)
- Previous posts: Bishop of Noto (2007-08); Secretary General of the Italian Episcopal Conference (2008-13); Vice-President of the Commission of the Bishops' Conferences of the European Community (2018-2023)

Orders
- Ordination: 29 June 1979 by Costantino Trapani
- Consecration: 6 October 2007 by Paolo Romeo

Personal details
- Born: Mariano Crociata; 16 March 1953 (age 73) Castelvetrano, Trapani, Sicily, Italy
- Education: Almo Collegio Capranica; Pontifical Gregorian University
- Motto: Crux Christi pax
- Coat of arms

Styles of Mariano Crociata
- Reference style: The Most Reverend
- Spoken style: Your Excellency
- Religious style: Bishop

Mariano Crociata (born 16 March 1953) has been bishop of the Diocese of Latina-Terracina-Sezze-Priverno since 19 November 2013. He was previously the Secretary-General of the Italian Episcopal Conference (CEI), the first to come from a southern Italian diocese, and earlier served as Bishop of Noto.

== Early life and priesthood ==
Born in Castelvetrano, Province of Trapani, Sicily, Crociata was ordained as a priest in 1979. He studied philosophy and theology at the Almo Collegio Capranica. He graduated from the Pontifical Gregorian University of Rome, where he was awarded a doctorate in theology in 1987 on "Humanism and theology in Augustine Steuco" for the kinds of New Town in 1987.

Crociata ran the theology of religions department at Palermo's Theological School and has organised a number of conferences including many on Islam. From 2003 he was vicar general of the Diocese of Mazara del Vallo.

== Bishop ==
On 16 July 2007 Pope Benedict XVI appointed him Bishop of Noto. He was consecrated on 6 October 2007. On 26 September 2008 Benedict appointed him secretary general of the CEI to replace Giuseppe Betori who had been appointed archbishop of Florence. Crociata was reportedly named secretary general on the recommendation of archbishop of Genoa and CEI president Cardinal Angelo Bagnasco, who became president of the CEI in 2007. In October 2010 Bishop Crociata welcomed civil suits against priests for alleged sexual abuse. He said that "There will be no obstacles to civil proceedings. On the contrary, they would be viewed favourably," he told reporters following a meeting of the Episcopal Conference. "The Italian church acts rigorously and with the necessary attention for the victims," he added. Italian bishops say about 100 cases of sexual abuse of minors have been investigated by the church over the last decade. Critics say the number is far higher.

Upon his election as pope, Pope Francis did not confirm Crociata is his CEI post and instead named him bishop of Latina-Terracina-Sezze-Priverno. In doing so, Francis returned to the practice of the early years of the CEI under Paul VI, when the position of Secretary-General was not a stepping stone to a major diocese and eventual appointment as cardinal.

Catholic Church titles
Preceded by Giuseppe Malandrino	Bishop of Noto; 16 July 2007 – 25 September 2008	Succeeded by Antonio Staglianò
Preceded by Giuseppe Betori	Secretary-General of the Italian Episcopal Conference; 26 September 2008 – 19 November 2013	Succeeded by Nunzio Galantino
Preceded by Giuseppe Petrocchi	Bishop of Latina-Terracina-Sezze-Priverno; 19 November 2013 – present	Succeeded by Incumbent
