= Santa Maria Odigitria al Tritone =

- Church of Saint Mary Hodegetria at the Via Tritone
- Santa Maria in Costantinopoli; Santa Maria dei Siciliani
- Chiesa di Santa Maria Odigitria al Tritone
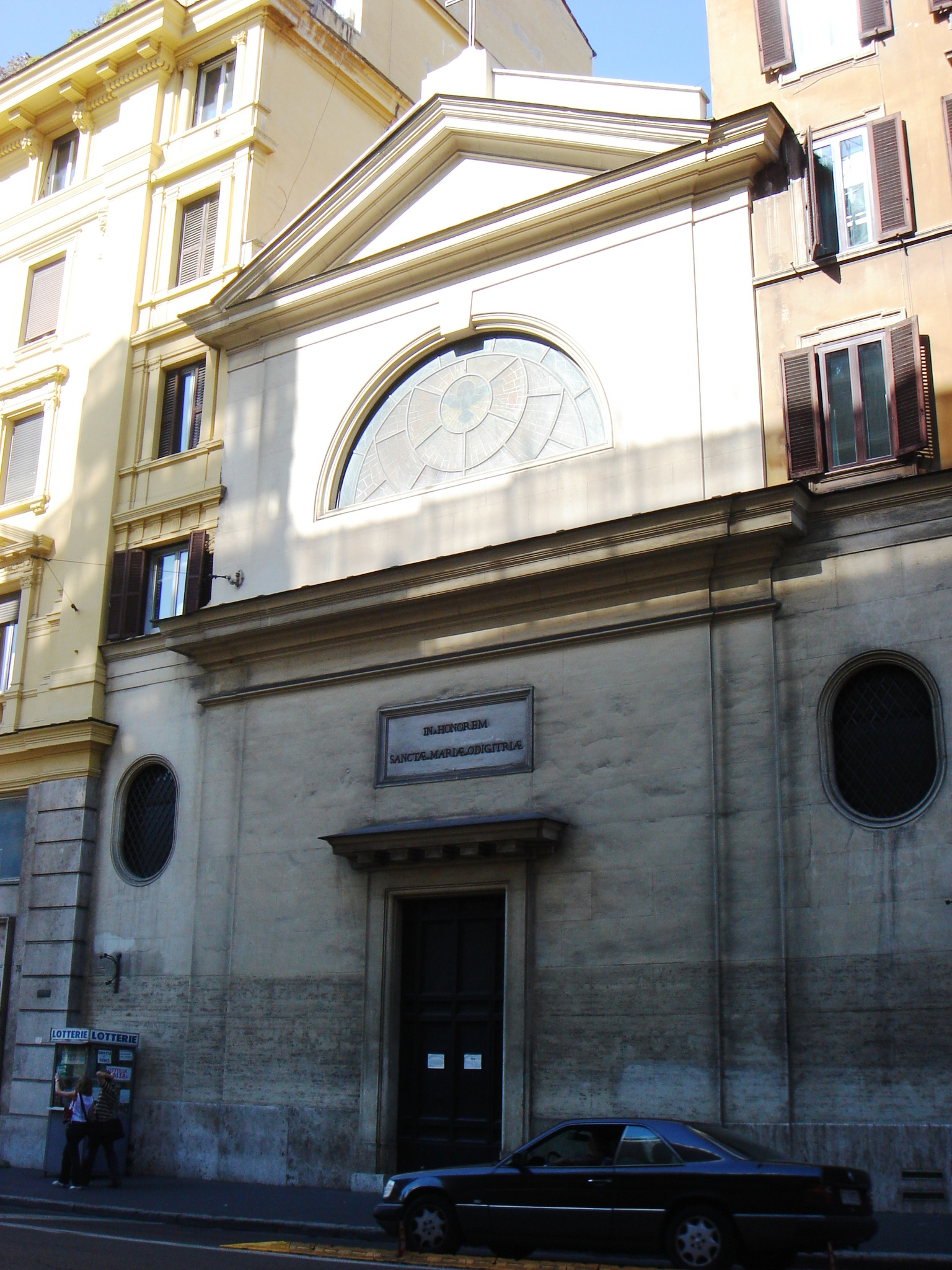
- Facade
- Click on the map for a fullscreen view
- 41°54′11.52″N 12°29′9.35″E
- Location: Via del Tritone 82, Rome
- Country: Italy
- Language: Italian
- Denomination: Catholic
- Tradition: Roman Rite
- Website: odigitria.org

History
- Status: titular church national church of Sicily
- Founded: 1594
- Dedication: Mary (as Hodegetria)

Architecture
- Architectural type: Baroque, Neoclassic
- Completed: 1817

Administration
- Diocese: Rome

Santa Maria Odigitria al Tritone ("Saint Mary Hodegetria at the Via Tritone"), sometimes Santa Maria dei Siciliani ("Saint Mary of Sicilians") or Santa Maria in Costantinopoli ("Saint Mary in Constantinople"), is a Roman Catholic church in Rome, located at civico 82 on via del Tritone in the Colonna district.

== History ==
The Confraternity of the Sicilians was officially recognized by the papal bull Pastoris Aeterni of Pope Clement VIII on 5 February 1594 and immediately began construction. The building, consecrated on 17 August 1596, was from the first the national church of Sicily, then ruled by the Crown of Aragon. Upon the integration of Sicily into Italy, it became regional rather than a national church. It is named after the icon of the Virgin Mary venerated in the church – it is of the Hodegetria ("She Who Shows the Way") type and was brought to Rome from Constantinople. The confraternity also had an oratory adjoining the church, which now displays a painting of Saint Rosalia by the Sicilian painter Gaetano Sottino.

During the French occupation of Rome from the end of the 18th century to the start of the 19th century, the church was deconsecrated. It was rebuilt by Francesco Manno between 1814 and 1817. In 1990 its four side chapels were used to display four altar frontals by Giuseppe Migneco (showing popes Leo II, Agaton and Methodius), Salvatore Fiume (Saint Lucy), Sebastiano Milluzzo (Saint Agatha), and Mario Bardi (Saint Rosalia).

Pope Paul VI made the church a cardinal deaconry on 12 February 1973 by the apostolic constitution Romana Templa.

== Holders ==
- Salvatore Pappalardo, title pro illa vice (March 5, 1973 – deceased December 10, 2006)
- Vacant (2006–2010)
- Paolo Romeo, title pro illa vice, (November 20, 2010 – deceased October 25, 2026)
- Vacant (2026–present)

== Bibliography ==
- C. Rendina, Le chiese di Roma, Newton & Compton editori, Roma 2000 ISBN 978-88-541-1833-1
