= Commission of the Bishops' Conferences of the European Union =

Commission of the Bishops' Conferences of the European Community
- Commissio Episcopatuum Communitatis Europaeae
- Abbreviation: COMECE
- Predecessor: European Catholic Pastoral Information Service
- Established: 3 March 1980; 46 years ago
- Type: Association without lucrative purpose
- Purpose: Represent episcopal conferences of EU member states at EU institutions
- Headquarters: Brussels, Belgium
- Region served: European Union
- Members: Bishops delegated by episcopal conferences of EU member states
- President: Bishop Mariano Crociata
- Main organ: Secretariat
- Website: comece.eu

The Commission of the Bishops' Conferences of the European Union, formerly the Commission of the Bishops' Conferences of the European Community, (Latin: Commissio Episcopatuum Communitatis Europaeae; COMECE) is the association of Catholic Church episcopal conferences in member states of the European Union (EU) which officially represents those episcopal conferences at EU institutions. COMECE holds two meetings of the Plenary Assembly each year, which set out the main lines of its work. The Apostolic Nuncio to the European Communities participates in these meetings. A seminal issue of the European integration process provides the core theme of each meeting.

COMECE bishops are delegated by Catholic episcopal conferences in EU member states and has a permanent Secretariat in Brussels, Belgium. It was established in 1980 and replaced the European Catholic Pastoral Information Service (SIPECA, 1976–1980). Discussions during the 1970s about creating an episcopal conferences' liaison organization to the European Community led to the decision, on the eve of the 1979 European Parliament election, to establish COMECE.

== Objectives ==
The objectives of COMECE are to:

- monitor EU "political processes" and "legal developments"
- communicate "opinions and views" about "European integration in the light of" Catholic social teaching
- communicate "concerns and opinions" of bishops about "the construction of a peaceful and prosperous Europe for all" to EU institutions
- offer "the co-operation and the service of the Church" to EU institutions
- respond to "questions and problems" of EU institutions
- maintain "transparent and regular dialogue with the EU Institutions"
- "inform and raise awareness among" episcopal conferences in EU member states and Catholics about topics of "common interest dealt with by the different institutions of the EU"
- assist episcopal conferences in EU member states with understanding "the challenges posed by" European integration
- "foster collegiality" between episcopal conferences in EU member states "in developing specific actions" with respect to European "social and ethical problems"

COMECE issues news bulletins and reports in the following "policy areas": Ecology, Energy & Agriculture; Ethics, Research & Health; EU External Affairs; Education & Culture; Justice, Fundamental Rights & Article 17 TFEU; Migration & Asylum; International Religious Freedom; Social & Economic Affairs; and Youth Policies.

== Organisation ==
COMECE's is managed by a standing committee of five, the president, currently Bishop Mariano Crociata of Latina, Italy, first vice president Archbishop Antoine Hérouard of Dijon, France, and three vice presidents: Bishops Nuno Brás da Silva Martins of Funchal, Portugal, Rimantas Norvila of Vilkaviškis, Lithuania, and Czeslaw Kozon of Copenhagen, Denmark. The official who runs the office on a day-to-day basis is the General Secretary, currently Fr. Manuel Barrios Prieto. The General Secretary is appointed for a three-year term renewable term.

Its standing committees include: Commission on Social Affairs; Legal Affairs Commission; Commission on EU External Relations; Working Group on Migration and Asylum; Working Group on Ethics; Working Group on Education and Culture.

COMECE is funded by the episcopal conferences in EU member states. Its secretariat is currently made of 10 people.

== Leadership ==
Presidents

- Franz Hengsbach, Bishop of Essen (1980 – 1984)
- Jean Hengen, Archbishop of Luxembourg (1984 – 1990)
- Charles Amarin Brand, Archbishop of Strasbourg (1990 – 1993)
- Josef Homeyer, Bishop of Hildesheim (1993 – 2006)
- Adrianus Herman van Luyn, Bishop of Rotterdam (2006 – 2012)
- Reinhard Marx, Cardinal Archbishop of Munich and Freising (2012 – 2018)
- Jean-Claude Hollerich, Cardinal Archbishop of Luxembourg (2018 – 2023)
- Mariano Crociata, Bishop of Latina (2023 – present)

General Secretaries

- Msgr. Paul Huot-Pleuroux, France (1980 – 1989)
- Fr. Paul Schaeffer, France (1989 – 1993)
- Msgr. Noël Treanor, Ireland (1993 – 2008)
- Msgr. Piotr Mazurkiewicz, Poland (2008 – 2012)
- Msgr. Patrick Daly, Ireland (2012 – 2016)
- Fr. Olivier Poquillon O.P., France (2016 – 2019)
- Fr. Manuel Barrios Prieto, Spain (2019 – present)

== See also ==
- Catholic Church in Europe
