= Vulturia =

'Vulturia عين الترك Cape Falcon
- Town
- Ain el-Turck
- Location within Algeria
- Coordinates: 35°44′27″N 0°44′57″W
- Elevation: 272 m (892 ft)

Vulturia was a Roman and Vandal era town of Mauretania Caesariensis in Roman North Africa.

== Location ==
It was a town in the Roman province of Mauretania Caesariensis, in present-day Algeria. and has been tentatively identified with ruins near Cape Falcon, Aïn El Turk (outside of Oran, Algeria). It was a flourishing city until the Arab invasion, at which time it became diocese in partibus infidelium as an area where the Christian community was overwhelmed by the Muslim conquest of the Maghreb.

The cape is a flat plain adjacent to the sea, with a mesa rising behind the plain, isolating it from the rest of Oran. The cape is today the site of Oran airport.

== Bishopric ==
The city was also the seat of an ancient Christian bishopric. We know only one bishop, of the town, Reparatus, who took part in the Council of Carthage (484) by the Vandal king, Huneric, after which Reparatus was exiled.

Today the bishopric of Vulturia survives as titular see and since 1933 has had six bishops. The current titular bishop is Rodrigo Mejía Saldarriaga, former apostolic vicar of Soddo who replaced Paolo Romeo in 2006. Other bishops of Vultura include Francesco Imberti (5 Sep 1966 Appointed – 27 Jan 1967) and Marco Cé (22 Apr 1970 – 7 Dec 1978).
