= Castle of Calendasco =

Castle in Calendasco, Italy

Coordinates: 45.0878°N 9.5984°E

- Castello di Calendasco
- Calendasco, Italy
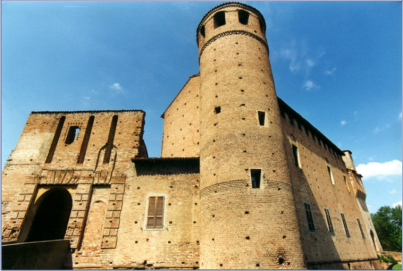

Site information
- Type: Castle
- Owner: Municipality of Calendasco private property
- Condition: Good

Site history
- Built: 11th century
- Built by: Roman Catholic Diocese of Piacenza–Bobbio
- Materials: Brick

The Castle of Calendasco (Castrum Calendaschi in Latin) is a fortification located in the Italian municipality of Calendasco, in the province of Piacenza.

The building, built entirely of brick, is substantially intact and in a good state of preservation, although in need of some restoration work.

The oldest part of the manor was built at the behest of the bishop count of Piacenza, whose territory of Calendasco was a fief, as architectural traces indicate, around the year 1000, while the first mention is in a document by Pope Urban II dating from 1187 in which the property rights of the monks of San Salvatore di Quartizzola in Calendasco were confirmed.

The castle with the receptum formed, together with the church and the pilgrims' hospital, the Calendaschi burg.

== History ==
The first nucleus of the castle, the receptum, dates back to the early 11th century, while the castle was built in the following century.

Within the walls of the castle was born in 1290 the noble Conrad of Piacenza, whose family was feudal lord bonis et juribus of the Calendasco area. At the end of the 13th century the castle, whose precise year of construction is unknown, appears to be owned by the Palastrelli and Scotti families.

In 1346, it was destroyed by the Ghibellines who had escaped from Piacenza; it was then rebuilt in the immediately following years by the Guelphs because of its important position in the resistance against the Visconti family.

In 1412 it was, then, entrusted by the duke of Milan Filippo Maria Visconti to Bartolomeo and Filippo Arcelli, whom he appointed counts of the Tidone valley, thus becoming an outpost in support of the castle of Somaglia, located on the opposite bank of the Po River. In the following years the castle would pass to the Confalonieri family, before returning to the Visconti and, then, again, to the Confalonieri, who would retain possession, albeit amidst ups and downs, until the last years of the 16th century.

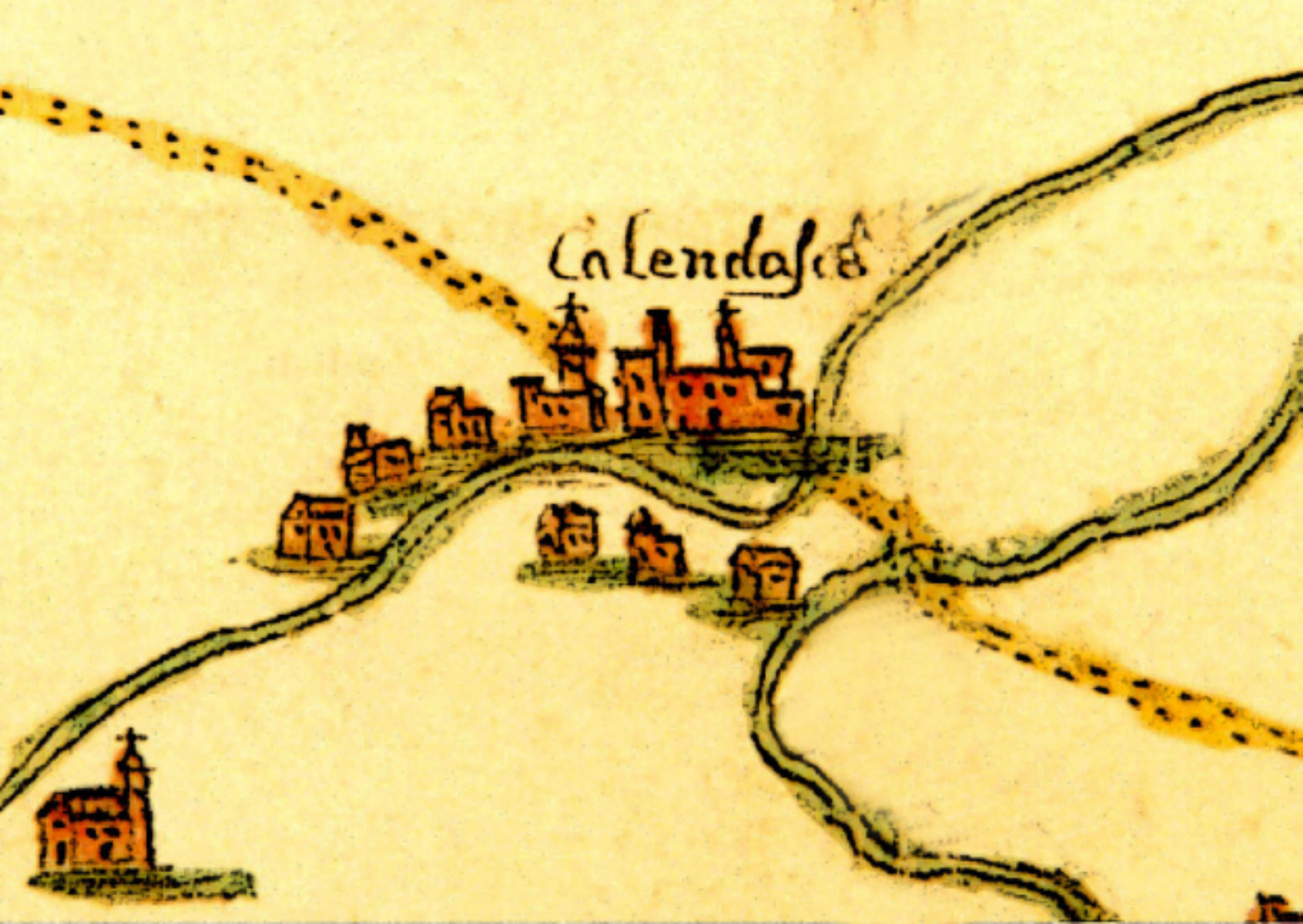
Detail of late sixteenth-century map where the village with the castle, church and pilgrims' hospital can be clearly seen; the whole map shows the road to the Po River harbor.

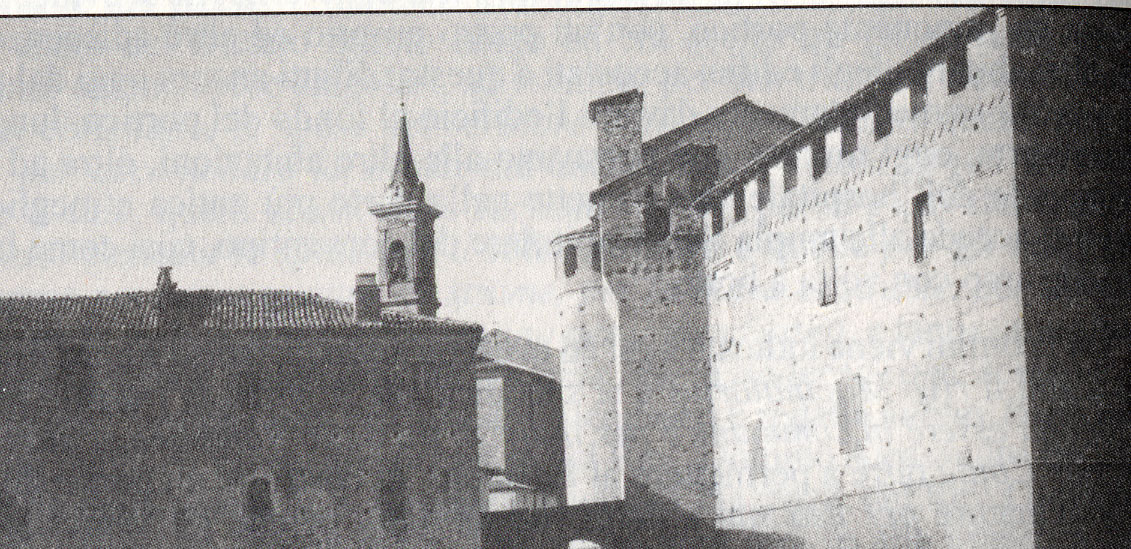
The 11th-century Calendasco receptum with the stables at its side and the castle tower and church in the background

On January 14, 1482, after several days of siege, the troops of the Duke of Milan, Gian Galeazzo Maria Sforza, wrestled the castle of Calendasco from Captain Antonio Confalonieri, who had taken refuge inside with his son-in-law Ottaviano Sanseverino. After the siege, however, the castle remained the property of the Confalonieri family, in the person of Captain Antonio Confalonieri.

Back under the control of the Confalonieri family following the decline of the Arcelli family, in 1572, the castle was the scene of the murder of Count Ludovico Confalonieri by Antonello De Rossi, lover of Countess Camilla, Ludovico's wife. Half of the fief thus passed to the Sanseverino family, related to the Confalonieri, who retained rights to the remaining half. In 1584 the Sanseverino family, through the Camera Ducale, sold their part of the fief to Count Gian Battista Zanardi Landi. The other half of the fief passed, however, under the stewardship of Count Benzoni, whose heirs retained it until 1674 when, with the passing of Duke Ludovico, it was again claimed by the Camera Ducale.

The last feudal lord of Calendasco, who, however, at the time of the fief was not granted ownership of the castle, was Count Fabio Perletti, husband of Countess Paola Anguissola d'Altoe', a jurist and Farnese ambassador to the imperial court. The fiefdom of Calendasco, Rena, Campadone, Reganella and Pernici was granted to him on April 14, 1690 by Ranuccio II Farnese, grateful to have Perletti, successfully negotiated at the imperial court and with the Dorias of Genoa the annexation to the Duchy of Parma and Piacenza of the fiefs of Bardi and Compiano, as well as for having successfully led the negotiations for the marriage of Odoardo II Farnese, eldest son of the duke and Isabella d'Este, to Dorotea Sofia of Neoburgo. The Perletti family, and some members of the Anguissola family, with whom they related, lived in Calendasco until the early 1900s.

In 1719, the Zanardi Landi family ceded its part of the castle in order to obtain financial resources to be used to make up for the difficult financial situation generated by Bartolomeo Zanardi Landi to Count Pier Francesco Scotti; at that time, the other portion of the building was instead owned by the Confraternita del Santo Rosario, which, years later, ceded it to Captain Pietro Rizzi. This portion, in 1913 was donated by the owner, jurist Giuseppe Scopesi della Capanna, whose family had received it by marriage, to a charity that later ceded it to the municipality of Calendasco. The other portion of the castle was, however, ceded by the Zanardi Landi family to the Guasconi lords.

In 2021, the manor house underwent restoration works aimed at the arrangement of the entrance bridge, the main facade, the hallway equipped with an umbrella vault and the hall on the ground floor. These interventions allowed for the rediscovery of the original terracotta flooring in the hall and entrance hall, a fireplace hidden by a panel, also in the hall, and a series of rooms located at the base of one of the towers, which had fallen into disrepair after having been reused for storage in the past and has been inaccessible since then.

== Structure ==
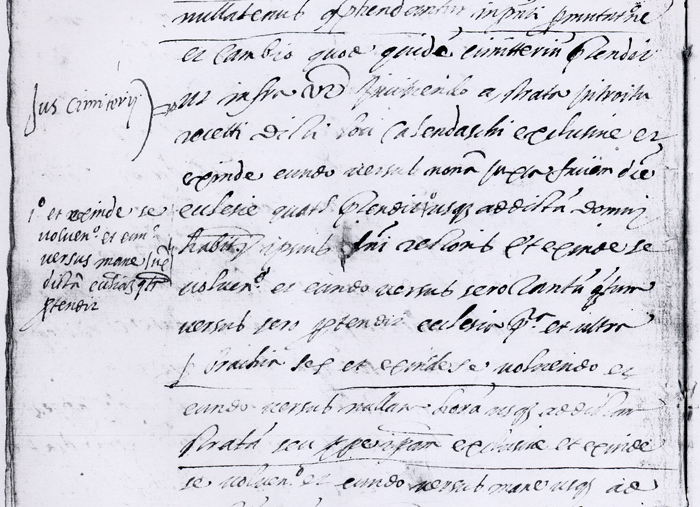
Detail of notarial deed of 1461 in which the presbyter of Calendasco is granted the right to a cemetery, a right pertaining to parish churches

The castle consists of a trapezoidal structure, built entirely of brick and characterized by the presence of Guelph merlons on the curtain line, against which four round towers rise. The structure is surrounded by a moat in which there is no longer the water that was originally found there and is accessible through 3 entrances, two of which have the drawbridge joints, later, replaced by brick bridges. Another entrance, however, called the rescue gate, is via a bridge shaft.

A cylindrical tower overlooks the main entrance to the manor, which leads to an inner courtyard characterized by a double gallery.

Inside there are two large halls with fireplaces, which are the upper caminata magna and the lower caminata magna: both are defined as magne, that is, very large, in some medieval documents. Some rooms preserve wooden coffered ceilings, while on the walls of the large vault located at the entrance are visible, although not in good condition, 16th-century frescoes.

Adjacent to the castle, a century older, is the receptum, also with a raised entrance with its own small entrance attached, with its masonry baptistery still clearly visible; this building also had its own small turret, located on the northwest side and completely ruined. On the same square located in front of the receptum and the castle is the building that contained the stables.

== See also ==
- Calendasco
- Piacenza
- Conrad of Piacenza
- Via Francigena

== Bibliography ==
- Artocchini, Carmen (1983). Castelli piacentini [Castles of Piacenza] (in Italian). Piacenza: Edizioni TEP.
