= Giuseppe Malandrino =

Italian Roman Catholic prelate (1931–2025)

- Bishop Emeritus of Noto
- Church: Roman Catholic Church
- Archdiocese: Siracusa
- Diocese: Noto
- Installed: 19 June 1998
- Term ended: 16 July 2007
- Predecessor: Salvatore Nicolosi
- Successor: Mariano Crociata
- Other post: Bishop of Acireale (1979–98)

Orders
- Ordination: 19 March 1955 by Angelo Calabretta
- Consecration: 26 January 1980 by cardinal Salvatore Pappalardo

Personal details
- Born: 12 July 1931 Pachino, Italy
- Died: 3 August 2025 (aged 94) Aci Sant'Antonio, Italy
- Denomination: Roman Catholic
- Motto: Dei Verbum audiens
- Coat of arms

Styles of Giuseppe Malandrino
- Reference style: His Excellency; The Most Reverend
- Spoken style: Your Excellency
- Religious style: Bishop

Giuseppe Malandrino (12 July 1931 – 3 August 2025) was an Italian Roman Catholic prelate.

== Biography ==
After his studies in preparation for the priesthood in Rome, Malandrino was ordained a priest on 19 March 1955 by Bishop Angelo Calabretta, Bishop of Noto.

On 30 November 1979, Pope John Paul II appointed Malandrino Bishop of Acireale.

Malandrino received episcopal ordination on 26 January 1980 in Modica from Cardinal Salvatore Pappalardo, co-consecrators Bishop Salvatore Nicolosi, Bishop of Noto, and Archbishop Calogero Lauricella, Archbishop of Syracuse; he took canonical possession of the diocese on the following 24 February.

In 1987 Malandrino established the Central Diocesan Library in Acireale into which the funds of the Seminary Library, the former "Mons. Salvatore Russo" library, the "S. Agostino" Institute of Religious Sciences, the library of the Città del Fanciullo and various book collections flowed.

On 16 July 2007, Pope Benedict XVI accepted Malandrino's resignation for reasons of age, at the same time appointing him apostolic administrator of the diocese, a position he held until the following 6 October when his successor Mariano Crociata took possession of the diocese.

Malandrino died on 3 August 2025, aged 94.

Catholic Church titles
Preceded by Salvatore Nicolosi	Bishop of Noto; 1988–2007	Succeeded by Mariano Crociata
Preceded by Pasquale Bacile	Bishop of Acireale; 1979–1998	Succeeded by Salvatore Gristina
