= Giuseppe Ducrot =

Italian sculptor

Giuseppe Ducrot (born 1966 in Rome) is an Italian sculptor and member of the Pontifical Academy of Fine Arts and Letters of the Virtuosi al Pantheon.

== Life ==
Born in 1966 Ducrot set out in tempera painting and black-white drawings. During his military-service he painted a portrait series of his comrades. After a time of experimenting, among others within the workshops of the figurative painter Giovanni Colacicchi and the sculptor Vito Cipolla, Ducrot dedicated himself entirely to the plastic arts. Despite some approaches to abstraction the majority of Ducrot's oeuvre emulates Imperial Roman and Hellenistic art as well as the dynamics of Baroque sculpture. He works in terracotta, glazed ceramics, marble and lost wax bronze casting. Apart from numerous bozzetti Ducrot's works comprise both projects within the range of heritage conservation and private as well as Church commissions. Since 2013 Ducrot members among the Pontifical Academy of Fine Arts (Class for Painting). He lives and works in Rome.

== Works (selection) ==
Hitherto Ducrot's principal works are:

- 1995 Bust of Marcus Aurelius for the facade of Galleria Borghese, Rome
- 1996 Herm of a Nymph for Piazza Capo di Ferro, Rome
- 1999 Bust reliquary (bronze) of Saint Filippo Neri for the basilica of San Giovanni Battista dei Fiorentini, Rome
- 2000 Set of Cornucopia und Bacchus-urne for Galleria Borghese, Rome
- 2000 Altar, ambon and statue of St. Benedict for the Cathedral of Nursia
- 2009 Monumental statue of St. Benedict in Cassino (Lazio)
- 2010 Monumental statue of St Hannibal Mary of France commissioned by the Rogationists, exterior niche of St. Peter's Basilica, Rome
- 2011 Altar, ambon and crucifix for the Noto Cathedral, Sicily
- 2012 Statue of John the Baptist for the Basilica of St. Mary of the Angels and the Martyrs, Rome
- 2015 Fountain, Le Sirenuse, Positano (Amalfi)
- 2017 Statue of St. Matthew for the Theatine Church, Munich

== Bibliography ==
- Achille Bonito Oliva, Giuseppe Ducrot, sculture 1992–1994 (exhibition catalogue, Galleria Carlo Virgilio), Rome 1995.
- Alberto Abruzzese and Marco Tullio Giordana, Giuseppe Ducrot, ritratti per I cento passi, Rome 2000.
- Achille Bonito Oliva, Giuseppe Ducrot (exhibition catalogue, ARCO 20.02.2015–10.05.2015), Rome 2015.
