= Francesco Mori =

Italian painter (born 1975)

Francesco Mori (born 28 March 1975) is an Italian painter.

== Biography ==
Mori was born in Grosseto, Italy. Now an emerging painter and graphic artist, art historian and scholar of medieval art, Francesco Mori began his artistic career self-taught at an early age. During his university years he attended the workshops of Samuel Vanni and Roberto Altmann, both heirs of the master Pietro Annigoni (1910-1988), perfecting his drawing and painting techniques.

In collaboration with Roberto Altmann, Mori teaches art history, fresco, drawing and oil painting. He also exercises the art of calligraphy and illumination and participates in the courses of the Associazione Calligrafica Italiana (ACI), attending Italian and European master calligraphers such as Anna Ronchi, Klaus Peter Schaffel and Ivano Ziggiotti.

== Works ==
His artistic debut, crowning the theoretical and practical research of previous years, took place in 2006, when he was commissioned to paint a reproduction of the famous window by Duccio for the "fenestra rotunda magna", dating from 1288, in Siena Cathedral. Mori's copy has now replaced the original, which is preserved in the Museo dell'Opera del Duomo. In July 2007, Vittorio Sgarbi commissioned the design and execution of the windows for the rebuilt Noto Cathedral, which deals with the theme of the Word of God and the Seven Sacraments. On this occasion, Sgarbi said of him: "A simple and sensitive artist who offered an almost iconic representation in the spirit of a reborn Duilio Cambellotti." He has also made many significant contributions to Grosseto Cathedral.

=== Exhibitions ===
- 2009: "Race Against Time", an exhibition of paintings and graphics, gallery events, Grosseto
- 2010: "The Return", an exhibition of paintings, gallery events, Grosseto
- 2011: participation in the exhibition "The Shadow of the divine in contemporary art: Artists from Noto and elsewhere", Venice Biennale, Italy Pavilion
