= Diocese of Noto =

Latin Catholic diocese in Italy

Coordinates: 36°53′28″N 15°4′9″E

Diocese of Noto Dioecesis Netensis

Catholic
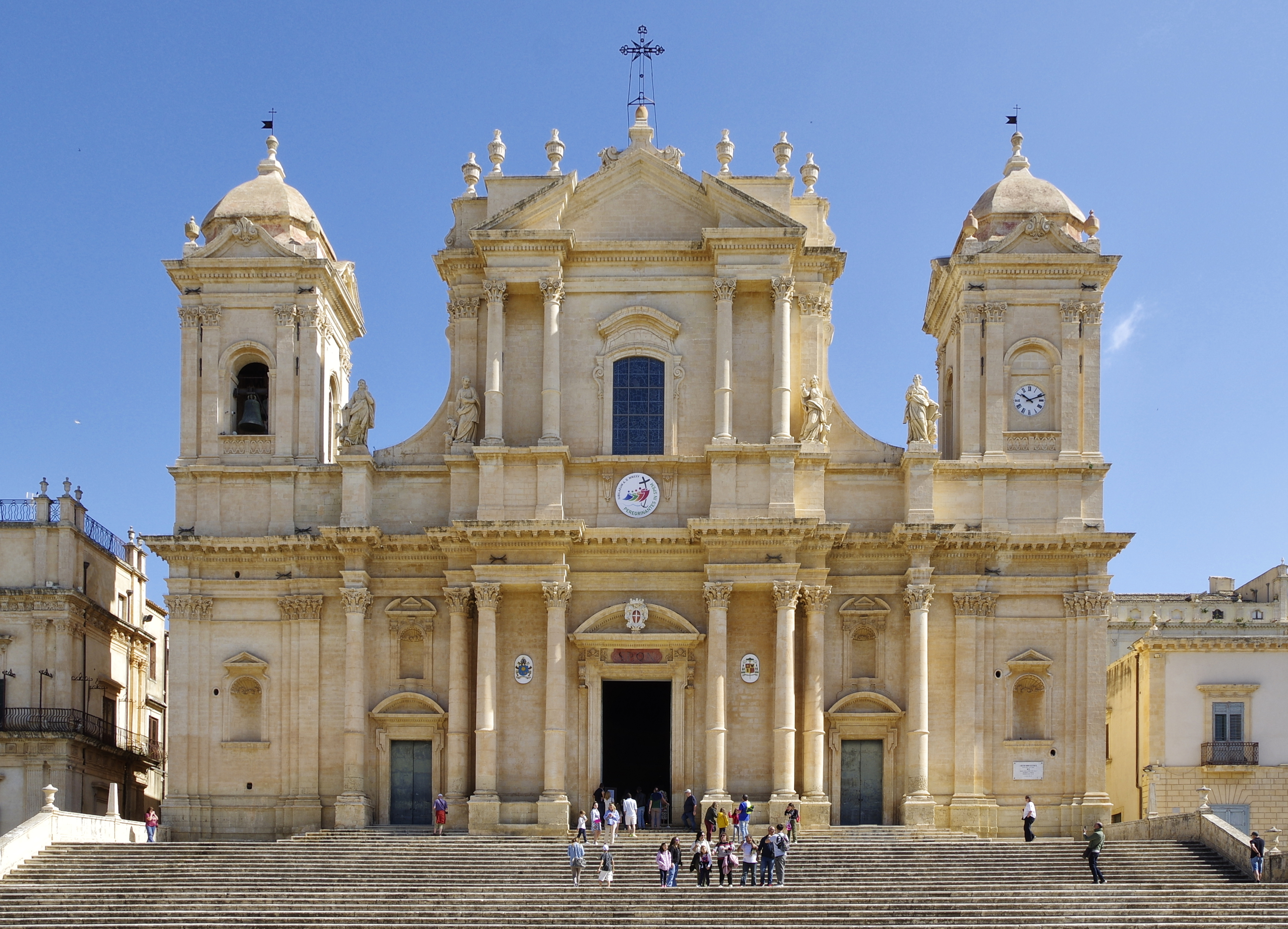
- Cattedrale di San Nicolò in Noto

Location
- Country: Italy
- Ecclesiastical province: Siracusa

Statistics
- Area: 1,323 km^{2} (511 sq mi)
- Population: Total; Catholics: (as of 2023); 215,082 ▼; 210,000 (est.) ▼ (97.5%)
- Parishes: 98

Information
- Denomination: Catholic Church
- Sui iuris church: Latin Church
- Rite: Roman Rite
- Established: 15 May 1844 (182 years ago)
- Cathedral: Cattedrale di San Nicolò
- Secular priests: 105 (diocesan) ▲24 (Religious orders) ▲22 Permanent Deacons

Current leadership
- Pope: Leo XIV
- Bishop: Salvatore Rumeo
- Bishops emeritus: Antonio Staglianò

Map
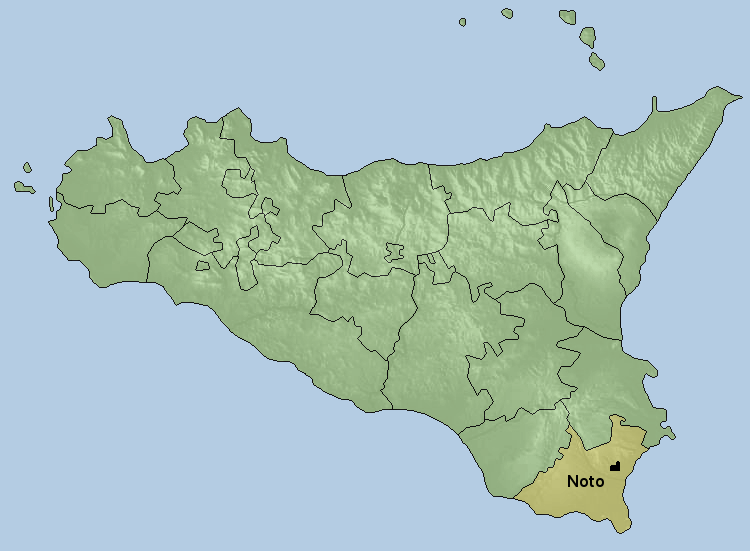

Website
- www.diocesinoto.it

The Diocese of Noto is a Latin Church diocese of the Catholic Church in Sicily, Italy. It is located in the extreme southeast corner of the island of Sicily, between the Free Municipal Consortium of Syracuse and the Free Municipal Consortium of Ragusa. It is a suffragan diocese of the Archdiocese of Siracusa.

The seat of the bishop is in the Cattedrale di San Nicolò in Noto. Since 2022, the bishop of the diocese is Monsignor Salvatore Rumeo.

== History ==
In 1609, the church of San Niccolò, Arcivescovo di Mira, was created a collegiate church, through the testamentary generosity of Baron Carlo Giavanti. The approval of the college of canons was granted by Pope Paul V, in a bull of 29 June 1609, and quickly received an exequatur of the king of Sicily. The College was composed of twelve canons, and was headed by a Provost, who was elected by the twelve canons. He was also the parish priest of the church. The canons who held stalls created by Carlo Giavanti had to be born and baptized in Noto. In 1651, the number of canons was increased by four, due to the testamentary grant of Rocco Pirri. Preference was given to relatives of Rocco Pirri. There were three dignities: provost, cantor, and treasurer.

On 11 January 1693, the city of Noto, which had a population of 12,043 at the time, suffered the effects of a major earthquake. 3,000 persons died, and the major church (San Niccolò), the other churches, convents and monasteries were destroyed. The city was rebuilt in a nearby location during the 18th century. Another major quake struck on 12 February 1897.

=== Churches ===
Built mostly in the eighteenth century, following the earthquake of 1693, a number of churches were designed by the Sicilian architect Rosario Gagliardi, including the Cattedrale di San Nicolò di Mira, the Monastery of Santa Chiara (1735), San Carlo al Corso, and San Domenico.

== Early efforts to restore the church in Sicily ==
In 1815, the Congress of Vienna restored the Papal States, and Pope Pius VII was able to return to his throne. It was imperative to remove the features of Napoleonic rule from the ecclesiastical structure of Italy, and relieve the stress on overburdened bishops. The Bourbon monarchy of Naples had been split, with the mainland falling under the power of the French with Joseph Bonaparte and then Joachim Murat ruling as king, and Sicily remaining under the control of King Ferdinand, his wife and their son. On the fall of Murat, he returned to Naples, abolished the constitution of Sicily, and on 12 December 1816 proclaimed himself King of the Two Sicilies. Though the pope was eager to negotiate a concordat with Ferdinand, a sticking point arose, in that the Kingdom of Naples had been a vassal of the Papacy, while Sicily was not; Ferdinand refused to recognize the suzerainty of the pope. During this time, Pius VII ordered the erection of three new dioceses in Sicily: Caltagirone (12 September 1816), Nicosia (17 March 1817), and Piazza Armerina (3 July 1817). The plan for an additional diocese did not materialize. A concordat was finally signed on 16 February 1818, and ratified by Pius VII on 25 February 1818. Ferdinand issued the concordat as a law on 21 March 1818. The re-erection of the dioceses of the kingdom and the ecclesiastical provinces took more than three years. The right of the king to nominate the candidate for a vacant bishopric was recognized, as in the Concordat of 1741, subject to papal confirmation (preconisation).

The Concordat of 1818 stated in Article III that no diocese then in existence would be suppressed, and allowed that new dioceses might be created in the future. In 1844, Pope Gregory XVI justified his creation of the diocese of Noto by pointing out that the diocese of Syracuse had grown to more than 230,000 inhabitants.

=== Establishment ===
At the urging of King Ferdinand II (1830–1859), the diocese of Noto was canonically erected on 15 May 1844, by Pope Gregory XVI, in the bull "Gravissimum sanum". In a preliminary step, the Collegiate Church of San Niccolò was reduced to the status of a parish church, and its seventeen canonries were suppressed, along with their various privileges. San Niccolò was then raised to the dignity of a cathedral, and the seventeen ex-canons were appointed canons of the cathedral, headed by a provost. Two of the canons were named Penitentiary and Theologus, though they were not counted as dignities.

The territory of Noto was separated from the Archdiocese of Syracuse, and the diocese of Noto became its suffragan. In 1857, the city of Noto had a population of 10,873. The bishop's income was to be derived, in part, from the suppression of the abbey of the Arco di Neto, founded in 1212, whose patronage belonged to the king but which was vacant at the time.

The Fourth Regional Catholic Congress of Sicily (IV Congresso Regionale Cattolico di Sicilia) was held in Noto from 14 to 17 December 1903. It was presided over by Cardinal Giuseppe Francica-Nava de Bontifè of Catania, and included seven bishops, among them Giovanni Blandini of Noto. Blandini was influential in introducing the priests of the Society of the Divine Savior (Salvatorians) into his diocese, and in 1904 they occupied part of the convent of San Francesco in Noto.

On 11 July 1950, a decree of the Sacred Consistorial Congregation removed the territory of five communes, along with their parishes, from the diocese of Noto and attached them to the archdiocese of Siracusa. Similarly, the territory of the city of Giarratana was removed from Noto and assigned to Ragusa.

Since 1 October 1955, when the diocese of Ragusa was separated from the archdiocese of Siracusa, Siracusa has had two suffragans, Noto and Ragusa.

== Bishops of Noto ==
1. Giuseppe Menditto (22 July 1844 – 13 November 1849), resigned
2. Giovanni Battista Naselli, C.O. (17 February 1851 – 27 June 1853), nominated Archbishop of Palermo
3. Mario Giuseppe Mirone (27 June 1853 – 17 February 1864)
4. Benedetto Lavecchia, O.F.M. (23 February 1872 – 5 July 1875), appointed Archbishop of Siracusa
5. Giovanni Blandini (5 July 1875 – 4 January 1913)
6. Giuseppe Vizzini (19 August 1913 – 8 December 1935)
7. Angelo Calabretta (16 July 1936 – 27 June 1970), resigned and appointed Titular Bishop of Vergi
8. Salvatore Nicolosi (27 June 1970 – 19 Giugno 1998), retired
9. Giuseppe Malandrino (19 June 1998 – 16 July 2007), retired
10. Mariano Crociata (16 July 2007 – 20 October 2008), appointed Secretary-General of the Italian Episcopal Conference
11. Antonio Staglianò (22 January 2009 – 6 August 2022), appointed President of the Pontifical Academy of Theology
12. Salvatore Rumeo (22 December 2022 – present)

== See also ==
- Roman Catholic Archdiocese of Siracusa

== Sources ==
- Benigni, Umberto (1911). "Diocese of Noto" . Catholic Encyclopedia. Vol. 11.
- Cappelletti, Giuseppe (1870). Le chiese d'Italia dalla loro origine sino ai nostri giorni (in Italian). Vol. vigesimoprimo (21). Venezia: Antonelli. pp. 631–632.
- Ciccarelli, Diego; Sarzana, Simona (2005). Francescanesimo e cultura a Noto atti del convegno internazionale di studi : Parrocchia S. Francesco d'Assisi all'Immacolata, Noto 7-9 novembre 2003. (in Italian). Palermo: Officina di Studi Medievali, 2005.
- Ritzler, Remigius; Sefrin, Pirminus (1968). Hierarchia Catholica medii et recentioris aevi (in Latin). Vol. VII (1800–1846. Monasterii: Libr. Regensburgiana.
- Remigius Ritzler; Pirminus Sefrin (1978). Hierarchia catholica Medii et recentioris aevi (in Latin). Vol. VIII (1846–1903). Il Messaggero di S. Antonio.
- Pięta, Zenon (2002). Hierarchia catholica medii et recentioris aevi (in Latin). Vol. IX (1903–1922). Padua: Messagero di San Antonio. ISBN 978-88-250-1000-8.
- Tobriner, Stephen (1982). The Genesis of Noto: An Eighteenth-century Sicilian City. Berkeley-Los Angeles: University of California Press 1982.

=== External links ===
- Website of the Diocese
- GCatholic.org
- Catholic Hierarchy
