= Calendasco =

- Comune
- Comune di Calendasco
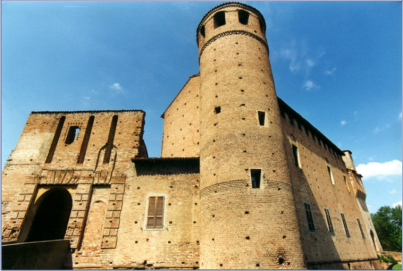
- The 12th-century castle of Calendasco

- Coat of arms

- Location within Italy Location within Emilia-Romagna
- Coordinates: 45°5′N 9°36′E
- Country: Italy
- Region: Emilia-Romagna
- Province: Piacenza (PC)
- Frazioni: Boscone Cusani, Cotrebbia Nuova

Government
  - Mayor: Francesco Zangrandi

Area
  - Total: 37.3 km^{2} (14.4 sq mi)
- Elevation: 55 m (180 ft)

Population (31 August 2007)
  - Total: 2,412
  - Density: 64.7/km^{2} (167/sq mi)
- Demonym: Calendaschesi
- Time zone: UTC+1 (CET)
  - Summer (DST): UTC+2 (CEST)
- Postal code: 29010
- Dialing code: 0523
- Website: Official website

Calendasco (Piacentino: Calindasch) is a comune (municipality) in the Province of Piacenza in the Italian region Emilia-Romagna, located about 150 kilometres (93 mi) northwest of Bologna and about 9 kilometres (6 mi) northwest of Piacenza.

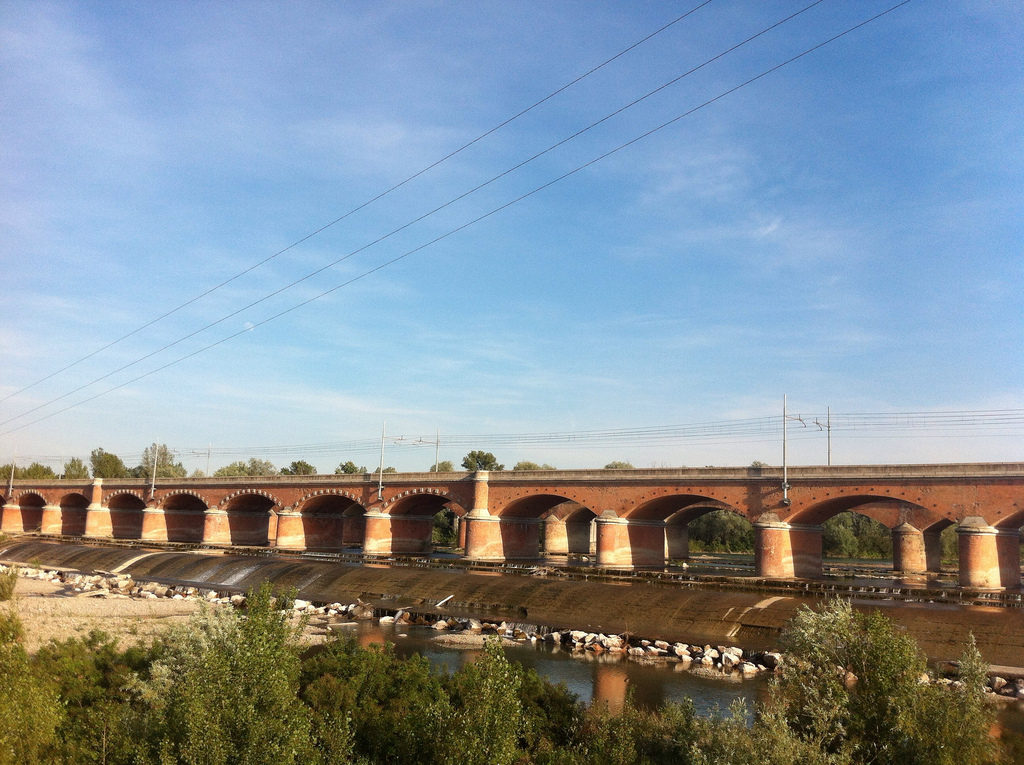
Bridge on the Trebia

Calendasco was founded along the Via Emilia; entering the town over the bridge over the Trebbia River is a plaque commemorating the Battle of Trebbia (213 BC) where the army of Hannibal defeated the Romans.

== See also ==
- Castle of Calendasco
