= Paolo Romeo =

Italian cardinal and archbishop (1938–2026)

His Eminence Paolo Romeo
- Cardinal, Archbishop of Palermo
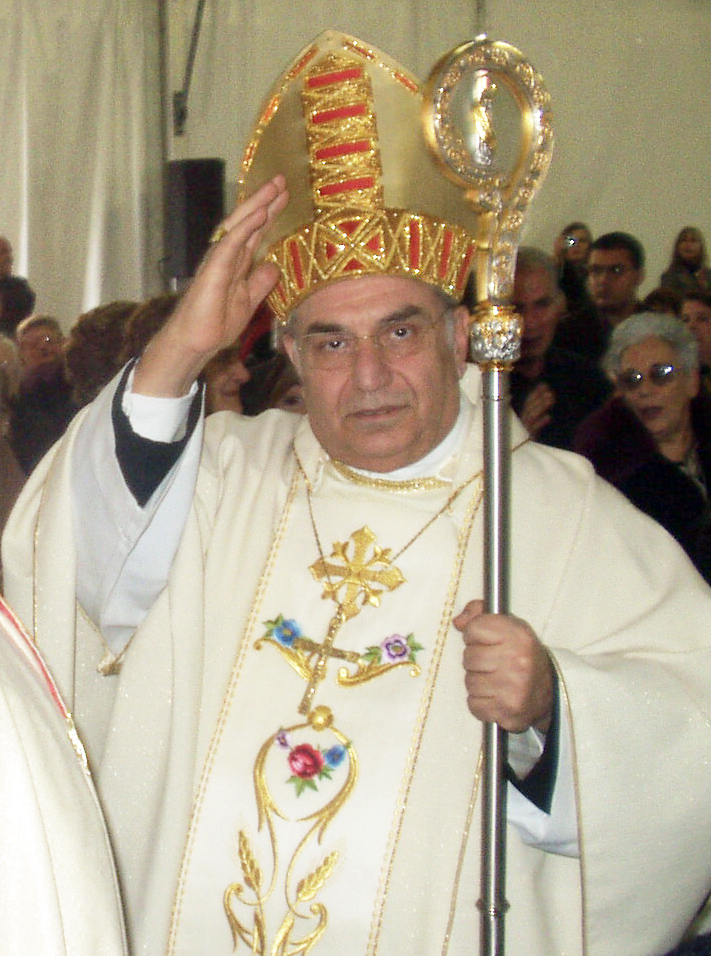
- Romeo in 2006
- Archdiocese: Palermo
- Appointed: 19 December 2006
- Installed: 10 February 2007
- Term ended: 27 October 2015
- Predecessor: Salvatore De Giorgi
- Successor: Corrado Lorefice
- Other post: Cardinal-Priest of Santa Maria Odigitria dei Siciliani (2010–)
- Previous posts: Titular Archbishop of Vulturia (1983–2006); Apostolic Nuncio to Haiti (1983–90); Apostolic Nuncio to Colombia (1990–99); Apostolic Nuncio to Canada (1999–2001); Apostolic Nuncio to Italy (2001–06); Apostolic Nuncio to San Marino (2001–06)

Orders
- Ordination: 18 March 1961 by Angelo Calabretta
- Consecration: 6 January 1984 by John Paul II
- Created cardinal: 20 November 2010 by Benedict XVI
- Rank: Cardinal-Priest

Personal details
- Born: 20 February 1938 Acireale, Kingdom of Italy
- Died: 25 October 2026 (aged 88) Catania, Italy
- Denomination: Catholic Church
- Education: Pontifical Gregorian University; Pontifical Lateran University; Pontifical Ecclesiastical Academy
- Motto: Caritas omnia sustinet
- Coat of arms: Paolo Romeo's coat of arms

Styles of Paolo Romeo
- Reference style: His Eminence
- Spoken style: Your Eminence
- Informal style: Cardinal

Paolo Romeo (20 February 1938 – 25 October 2026) was an Italian cardinal and archbishop of Palermo from 2007 to 2015.

== Early years ==
Romeo was the fifth of nine children. After primary school, he entered the seminary and began studying theology.

His bishop sent him to Rome in 1959 to complete his academic studies, and he earned a licentiate in theology at the Gregorian University and a doctorate in canon law at the Pontifical Lateran University.

He was ordained a priest for the Diocese of Acireale on 18 March 1961 at the chapel of the Episcopal Seminary of Acireale. He continued his studies at the university and did pastoral ministry as assistant to the Scouts Group Roma IX in Collegio San Giuseppe in Piazza di Spagna and diocesan assistant of the association Silenziosi Operai della Croce.

== Diplomatic work ==
In 1964, he was admitted to the Pontifical Ecclesiastical Academy and on 1 January 1967 he entered the diplomatic service of the Holy See. Romeo worked in the nunciatures in the Philippines, Belgium, Luxembourg, the European Community, Venezuela, Rwanda, and Burundi. In 1967, he was called to the Council for Public Affairs of the Church in the Secretariat of State. At the same time, he worked as director of the Casa Internazionale del Clero and was regional assistant for the Lazio of the AGESC.

In 1976, he was recalled to the Vatican Secretariat of State to monitor the life of the Catholic community in the countries of Latin America and the activities of the Latin American Episcopal Conference during its preparations for the Third General Conference of that continent, which opened on 29 January 1979.

On 17 December 1983, he was appointed Titular Archbishop of Vulturia by Pope John Paul II and that same day was appointed Apostolic Nuncio to Haiti. He received his episcopal consecration from John Paul on 6 January 1984.

Romeo was named Nuncio in Colombia in April 1990. On 5 February 1999, he was appointed Nuncio to Canada.

On 17 April 2001, he was named to represent the Holy See in Italy and San Marino.

== Archbishop of Palermo ==
Pope Benedict XVI appointed Romeo to serve as the Metropolitan Archbishop of Palermo on 19 December 2006, replacing Salvatore De Giorgi, who had reached the retirement age of 75 in September 2005. In 2005, Romeo was awarded the Knight Grand Cross of the Order of Merit of the Italian Republic. Romeo received the pallium in St. Peter's Basilica on 29 June 2007 from Pope Benedict along with 45 other metropolitan archbishops. Romeo was elected president of the Sicilian Episcopal Conference on 14 February 2007.

Romeo was created Cardinal-Priest of Santa Maria Odigitria at a consistory on 20 November 2010. He was one of the cardinal electors who participated in the 2013 papal conclave that elected Pope Francis.

In December 2010, he was appointed a member of the Pontifical Council for the Laity. On 3 October 2010, he welcomed Pope Benedict when he visited the Sicilian capital. Romeo was Sicilian Grand Prior of the Lieutenancy of the Equestrian Order of the Holy Sepulchre of Jerusalem. At age 75, he submitted his resignation letter to Pope Francis, which was accepted on 27 October 2015.

== Death ==
In retirement Romeo lived in the city of his birth, Acireale. He died on 25 October 2026, aged 88, in San Marco Hospital in Catania.

Diplomatic posts
| Preceded by Luigi Conti | Apostolic Nuncio to Haiti; 17 December 1983 – 24 April 1990 | Succeeded by Giuseppe Leanza |
| Preceded by Angelo Acerbi | Apostolic Nuncio to Colombia; 24 April 1990 – 5 February 1999 | Succeeded by Beniamino Stella |
| Preceded by Carlo Curis | Apostolic Nuncio to Canada; 5 February 1999 – 17 April 2001 | Succeeded by Luigi Ventura |
| Preceded by Andrea Cordero Lanza di Montezemolo | Apostolic Nuncio to Italy and San Marino; 17 April 2001 – 19 December 2006 | Succeeded by Giuseppe Bertello |
Catholic Church titles
| Preceded by Marco Cé | Titular Archbishop of Vulturia; 17 December 1983 – 19 December 2006 | Succeeded by Rodrigo Mejía Saldarriaga |
| Preceded by Salvatore De Giorgi | Archbishop of Palermo; 19 December 2006 – 27 October 2015 | Succeeded by Corrado Lorefice |
| Preceded by Sotir Ferrara | Apostolic Administrator of Eparchy of Piana degli Albanesi; 8 April 2013 – 28 June 2015 | Succeeded by Giorgio Demetrio Gallaro |
