= Netum =

Ancient town in the south of Sicily

Coordinates: 36.8830°N 15.0830°E

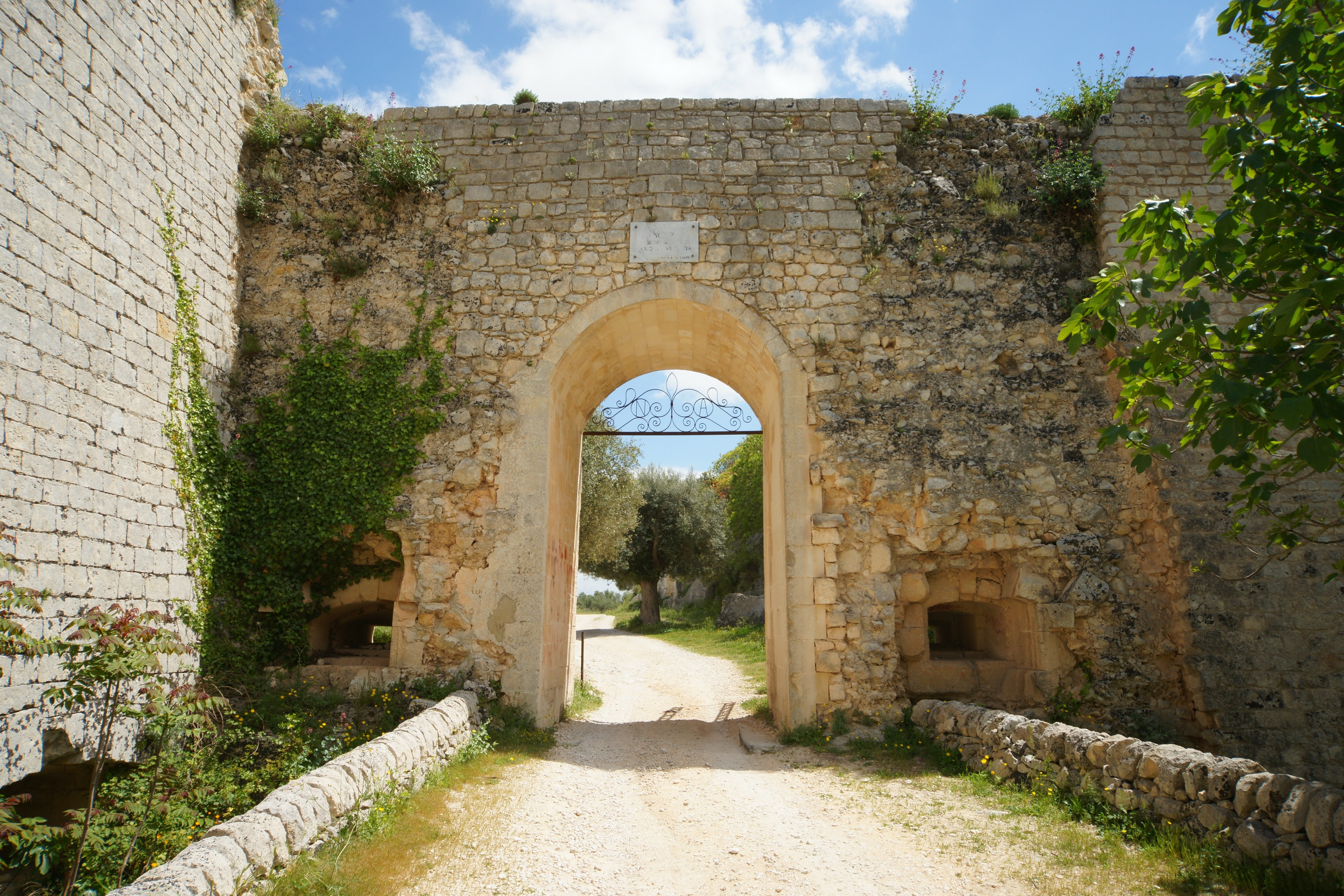
City gate

Netum or Neetum (Greek: Νέητον), was a considerable ancient town in the south of Sicily, near the sources of the little river Asinarus (modern Falconara), and about 34 km southwest of Syracuse. Its current site is at the località of Noto Antica (formerly Noto Vecchio), in the modern comune of Noto.

== History ==
Inhabited by the Sicels, it was subject to Syracuse; in a 263 BCE treaty between the Roman Republic and King Hieron II of Syracuse, Netum was one of the cities left in subjection to that monarch. We have no account of the circumstances which subsequently earned for the Netini the peculiarly privileged position in which we afterwards find them: but in the days of Cicero Netum enjoyed the rights of a foederata civitas like Messana (modern Messina) and Tauromenium (modern Taormina); while, in Pliny's time, it still retained the rank of a Latin town (civitas Latinae conditionis), a favor then enjoyed by only three cities in the island. Ptolemy is the last ancient writer that mentions the name; but there is no doubt that it continued to exist throughout the Middle Ages; and under the Norman kings rose to be a place of great importance, and the capital of the southern province of Sicily, to which it gave the name of Val di Noto. But having suffered repeatedly from earthquakes, the inhabitants were induced to emigrate to a site nearer the sea, where they founded the modern city of Noto, in 1703.

== Current situation and archaeology ==
The old site, which is now known as Noto Antica (formerly Noto Vecchio), is on the summit of a lofty hill about 14 km from the modern town and 20 km from the sea-coast: some remains of the ancient amphitheatre, and of a building called a gymnasium, are still visible, and a Greek inscription, which belongs to the time of Hieron II.
