= Salvatore Nicolosi =

Italian Prelate

- Bishop of the Diocese of Noto (Emeritus)
- Church: Roman Catholic Church
- See: Diocese of Noto
- In office: 1970–1998
- Predecessor: Angelo Calabretta
- Successor: Giuseppe Malandrino
- Previous post(s): Prelate

Orders
- Ordination: 22 October 1944

Personal details
- Born: 20 February 1922; Pedara, Italy
- Died: 10 January 2014 (aged 91); Noto, Italy

Salvatore Nicolosi (20 February 1922 – 10 January 2014) was an Italian Prelate of Roman Catholic Church.

Nicolosi was born in Pedara, Italy and was ordained a priest on 22 October 1944. Nicolosi was appointed bishop to the Diocese of Lipari on 21 March 1963 and ordained bishop on 21 April 1963. Nicolosi was appointed bishop of the Diocese of Noto on 27 June 1970 and retired from the diocese on 19 June 1998.
