= Antonio Staglianò =

Italian prelate (born 1959)

- President of the Pontifical Academy of Theology
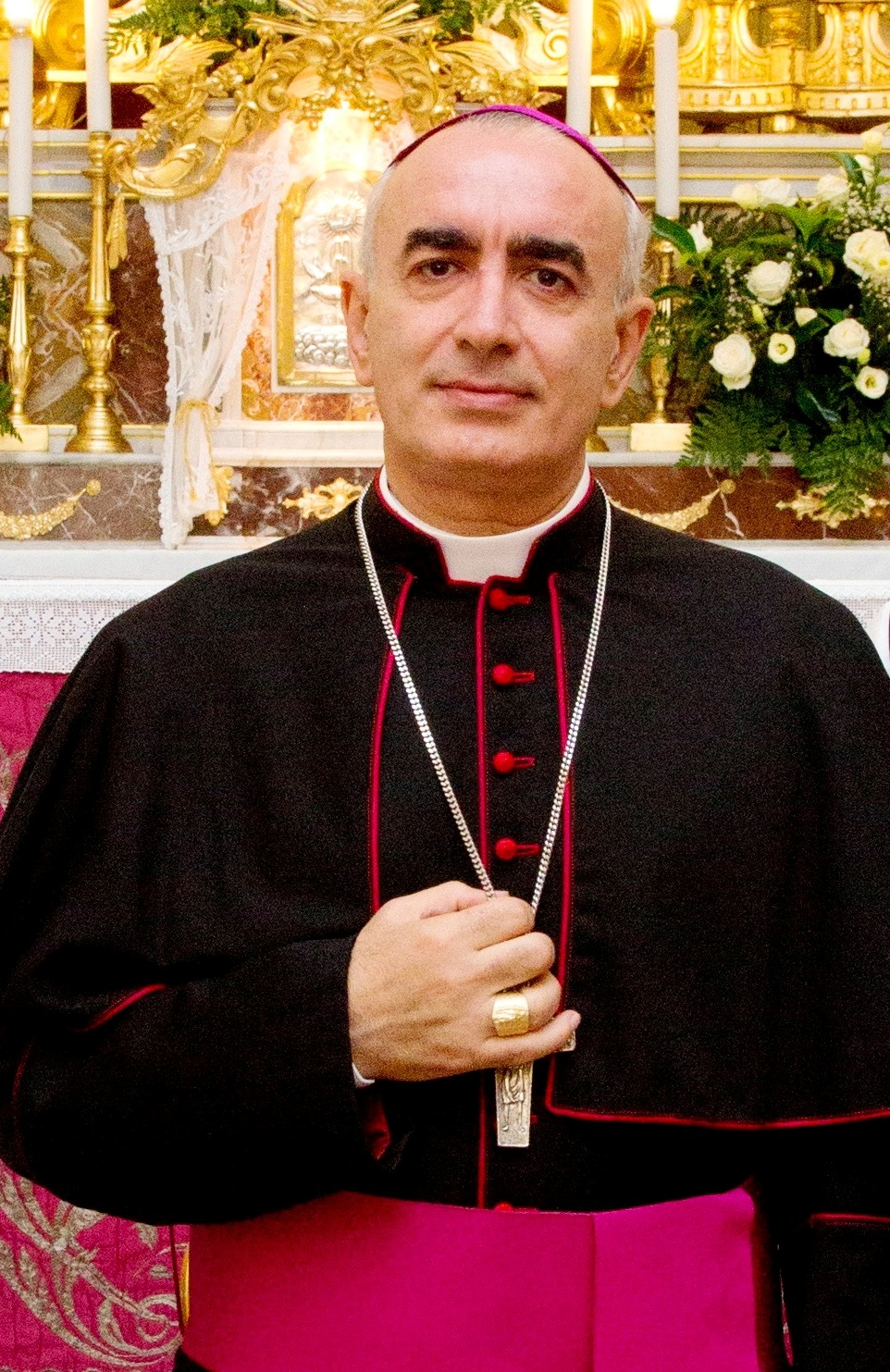
- Church: Catholic Church
- Appointed: 6 August 2022
- Predecessor: Ignazio Sanna
- Previous posts: Apostolic Administrator of Noto (2022-2023); Bishop of Noto (2009-2022)

Orders
- Ordination: 20 October 1984 by Giuseppe Agostino
- Consecration: 19 March 2009 by Camillo Ruini

Personal details
- Born: 14 June 1959 (age 67) Isola di Capo Rizzuto, Calabria, Italy

Styles of Antonio Staglianò
- Reference style: The Most Reverend
- Spoken style: Your Excellency
- Religious style: Bishop

Antonio Staglianò (born 14 June 1959) is an Italian prelate of the Catholic Church who is president of the Pontifical Academy of Theology. He was bishop of Noto in Sicily from 2009 to 2022. Before becoming a bishop he was a clergyman of the Archdiocese of Crotone-Santa Severina.

== Biography ==
Antonio Staglianò was born in Isola Capo Rizzuto in the Archdiocese of Crotone-Santa Severina on 14 June 1959. He attended courses in the minor seminary of Crotone and the high school of Reggio Calabria. He studied philosophy and theology in the seminaries of Saronno (1977–1979) and of Venegono (1979–1982), and then at the Pontifical Lombard Seminary (1982–1986). He completed a degree in fundamental theology at the Pontifical Gregorian University in 1986. He studied theology in Germany and received a degree in philosophy from the University of Cosenza in 1995.

He was ordained priest of the Archdiocese of Crotone-Santa Severina on 20 October 1984. He served as parochial vicar at San Dionigi (1986–1990) and Santa Rita (1990–1992), and in 1994 he became a member of the presbyteral council, canon of the cathedral, episcopal vicar, and director of culture for the Archdiocese. In 1999 he became parish priest at Le Castella.

He was director and a teacher at the Instituto Teologico Calabro He also taught at the Theological Faculty of Southern Italy in Naples and the Institute of Religious Science of Crotone. He taught theology at the Pontifical Gregorian University and Pontifical Urban University. He was appointed "adiutor secretarii specialis" in the General Assembly of the Synod of Bishops 2–23 October 2005. He wrote several theological publications.

He was appointed Bishop of Noto by Pope Benedict XVI on 22 January 2009. He was consecrated a bishop on 19 March 2009 by Cardinal Camillo Ruini and installed there on 31 March.

While bishop of Noto, he promoted a pastoral project known as Pop-Theology, designed to give more decisive impulses to the proclamation of the Gospel. Staglianò once said that “if theology wants to continue its task, it will have to speak beyond the conceptual realm of the academy and search for a new communicative language, which includes a more embodied and connected knowledge of the faith, corresponding to the cultural modalities with which people discover and live the meaning of their lives”.

In December 2021, he told schoolchildren that Father Christmas is imaginary and defended his remarks saying even young children knew this and everyone needs to recognize the problem with a character who only brings presents to families that are wealthy enough to buy them.

Pope Francis appointed him president of the Pontifical Academy of Theology on 6 August 2022.

Since 1997 he has been a consultant theologian of the National Service for the Cultural Project of the Italian Episcopal Conference (CEI). As of 2022 he was He a member of the International Council for Catechesis (COINCAT) and of the Commission for Culture and Social Communication of the CEI. Within the Sicilian Episcopal Conference he is a delegate for migrants.

Bishop Antonio Staglianò gave his greetings to Stefano Bisi, grand master of the Grand Orient of Italy Freemasonic Lodge, at the Ambrosianum Cultural Foundation in Milan on Feb. 16, 2024. The main speakers at the meeting were: Bishop Antonio Staglianò, Cardinal Francesco Coccopalmerio, Archbishop Mario Delpini; and the Italian Masonry leaders Stefano Bisi, Fabio Venzi, Luciano Romoli.

On September 23, 2024, Pope Francis appointed Staglianò as one of the 28 new consultors of the Dicastery for the Doctrine of the Faith.

== Religious views ==
=== Co-Redemptrix ===
Staglianò affirmed that the Marian title of Co-Redemptrix derives from derives from an erroneous analogy between the Lord Jesus and Mary in the work of Redemption.

=== Emanuele Severino ===
Citing Pierangelo Sequeri, Staglianò criticized Emanuele Severino's view according to which Christianism and its creatio ex nihilo are the highest espression of the "foolish" nihilism proper of the Western thought.

=== Freemasonry ===
In March 2024, Staglianò confirmed a Vatican sentence according to which Freemasonry's members are in a state of mortal sin and therefore can't receive the Eucharist.

== Selected works ==
- Una Speranza Per L'Italia, dal Sud una proposta per educare alla vita buona del Vagnelo [Hope for Italy, a proposal from the South for education towards the good life of the Gospel] (in Italian). Milan: Paoline Editoriale Libri. 2011. With a foreword by Cardinal Angelo Bagnasco

Catholic Church titles
Preceded by Mariano Crociata	Bishop of Noto; 31 March 2009 – 6 August 2022	Vacant
Preceded by Ignazio Sanna	President of the Pontifical Academy of Theology; 2022–present	Incumbent
