= Angelov =

Angelov is a Bulgarian surname, it may refer to:

Masculine surname:

- Angel Angelov (born 1948), former boxer from Bulgaria, silver Olympic medallist
- Anyu Angelov (born 1942), Bulgaria's Minister of Defense
- Atanas Angelov, Bulgarian sprint canoeist who competed in the mid-1990s
- Boris Angelov, Bulgarian amateur poker player fifth in Main Event 2024
- Darko Angelov, Macedonian diplomat with the Ministry of Foreign Affairs of the Republic of Macedonia
- Dimitar Angelov (born 1979), Bulgarian professional basketball player
- Emil Angelov (born 1980), Bulgarian footballer
- Georgi Angelov (born 1990), Bulgarian football player
- Ivo Angelov (born 1984), male wrestler from Bulgaria
- Kostadin Angelov (born 1973), former Bulgarian footballer
- Pano Angelov (1879–1903), known as Karabadzhakov, Bulgarian revolutionary in the Internal Macedonian-Adrianople Revolutionary Organization (IMARO)
- Petar Angelov (military officer) (1878–1923), Bulgarian military officer, revolutionary in the Internal Macedonian-Adrianople Revolutionary Organization (IMARO)
- Petar Angelov (handball) (born 1977), Macedonian handball player
- Plamen Angelov, English engineer
- Sasho Angelov (born 1969), Bulgarian football manager and former player
- Stanislav Angelov (born 1978), a.k.a. Pelé, Bulgarian football player
- Stefan Angelov (1947–2019), Bulgarian former wrestler
- Timo Angelov (1882–1903), Bulgarian revolutionary, a member of the Internal Macedonian-Adrianople Revolutionary Organization (IMARO)
- Todor Angelov (1900–1943), Bulgarian anarcho-communist revolutionary who lived and was active for a long time in Western Europe
- Vasil Angelov (1882–1953), Bulgarian military officer and a revolutionary in the Internal Macedonian-Adrianople Revolutionary Organization (IMARO)
- Yordan Angelov (1953–2013), Bulgarian former volleyball player who competed in the 1980 Summer Olympics

Feminine surname:

- Anna Angelova (born 1971), Bulgarian fencer
- Atanaska Angelova (born 1972), Bulgarian discus thrower
- Boyanka Angelova (born 1994), Bulgarian gymnast
- Božena Angelova (born 1981), Slovenian violinist
- Maria Angelova (1925–1999), Bulgarian Esperantist and author

Geography:

- Angelov (village), village in the municipality of Gabrovo, in Gabrovo Province, in northern central Bulgaria

== See also ==
- Angela (disambiguation)
- Angeli (disambiguation)
- Angelo (disambiguation)
- Angelos
