= Stango =

Stango is a surname of Italian origin. It is derived from Santangelo. Notable people with the surname include:

- Antonio Stango (born 1957), Italian political scientist
- John Stango (born 1958), American pop artist
- Blake Stango (born 1993), NFT Trader, Cannabis Marketing Director
