= Anghel =

Anghel is a Romanian family name and given name.

== Surname ==
- Alexandra Anghel (born 1997), Romanian freestyle wrestler
- Alin Anghel (born 1986), Romanian triple jumper
- Andrei Anghel (born 1989), Romanian luger
- Atanasie Anghel (died 1713), Romanian Greek-Catholic bishop
- Bianca Anghel (born 1985), Romanian long track speed skater
- Cătălin Anghel (born 1974), Romanian association football player and coach
- Dimitrie Anghel (1872–1914), Romanian poet
- Elisabeta Anghel (born 1967), Romanian hurdler
- Eugen Anghel (born 1973), Romanian association football player
- Gigel Anghel (born 1955), Romanian wrestler
- Grigore Anghel (born 1960), Romanian bobsledder
- Itai Anghel (born 1968), Israeli journalist
- Luminița Anghel (born 1968), Romanian singer, television personality, and politician
- Monica Anghel (born 1971), Romanian singer and television personality
- Natalia Anghel, one of the married names of Natalia Negru (1882–1962), Romanian poet and prose writer
- Roxana Anghel (born 1998), Romanian rower
- Stelian Anghel (1952–2009), Romanian association football player
- Vasile Anghel (1937–2014), Romanian association football player

== Given name ==
- Anghel Andreescu (born 1950), Romanian general
- Anghel Crețeanu (1910–1987), Romanian association football player
- Anghel Demetriescu (1847–1903), Romanian historian
- Anghel Iordănescu (born 1950), Romanian association football player and manager
- Anghel Mora, pen name of Mihai Diaconescu (1949–2000), Romanian film director, actor, poet, and musician
- Anghel Nour, Bessarabian politician
- Anghel Saligny (1854–1925), Romanian engineer

== See also ==
- Angel (disambiguation)
- Angela (disambiguation)
- Angeli (disambiguation)
- Angelo (disambiguation)
- Anghel Saligny Bridge, current name of King Carol I Bridge, a bridge complex in Romania
- Anghel Saligny metro station, a metro station in Bucharest, Romania
