= Angeli =

Angeli may refer to:

== Surname ==
=== In arts and media ===
- Alfredo Angeli (1927–2005), Italian director and screenwriter
- Angeli (cartoonist), Brazilian comic book writer and illustrator
- Ève Angeli (born 1980), French pop singer
- Filippo d'Angeli (1600–1660), Italian painter of the Baroque period
- Franco Angeli (1935-1988), Italian sculptor and painter
- Giulio Cesare Angeli (1570–1630), Italian painter of the early Baroque
- Giuseppe Angeli (1709–1798), Italian painter of the late-Baroque
- Heinrich von Angeli (1840–1925), Austrian painter
- Lou Angeli (1951–2013), American writer and film-maker
- Marguerite de Angeli (1889–1987), American writer and illustrator of children's books
- May Angeli (1937–2026), French visual artist and author
- Michael Angeli (born 1970), American writer and television producer
- Pier Angeli (1932–1971), Italian-born television and film actress

=== In politics ===
- Alfredo de Angeli (born 1956), rural leader of the Federación Agraria Argentina of Entre Ríos
- Giuseppe Angeli (1931-2016), Italian politician
- Jake Angeli (born 1988), American conspiracy theorist and activist

=== In sport ===
- Amedeo Angeli (1911–1965), Italian bobsledder
- Arnor Angeli (born 1991), Belgian footballer
- Benedicto Antonio Angeli (1939–2021), Brazilian football player
- Jordan Angeli (born 1986), American soccer player from Lakewood, Colorado
- Steve Angeli (born 2003), American football player
- Virna De Angeli (Gravedona, 27 February 1976), Italian former sprinter

=== Others with the surname ===
- Alicia Gironella D'Angeli, Mexican chef
- Angelo Angeli (1864–1931), Italian chemist
- Edgar Angeli (1892–1945), Croatian rear admiral of the Navy of Croatia
- Francesco degli Angeli (1567–1628), Italian Jesuit missionary to Ethiopia
- Jerome de Angelis (1567–1623), Italian Jesuit missionary to Japan
- Stefano degli Angeli (1623–1697), Italian mathematician

== Given name ==
- Angeli Bayani, Filipino actress
- Angeli Gonzales (born 1994), Filipino teen actress
- Angeli Nicole Sanoy (born 2001), Filipina child actress
- Marco Angeli di Sartèna (1905–1985), politician from Corsica
- Maria Angeli Tabaquero (born 1989), Filipino volleyball athlete
- Angeli Vanlaanen (born 1985), American freestyle skier

== Other uses ==
- Angeli, Finland, a village in Finnish Lapland
- Angeli di Varano, a village near Ancona in central Italy
- Angelica vestis, a monastic garment
- Angels, in the Italian language
- The Angeli–Rimini reaction
- Angeli, a novel by Alessandro Defilippi
- Angeli Foods, a US grocery store

== See also ==
- Angelic (disambiguation)
- Angelis (disambiguation)
- Angelo (disambiguation)
