= Angelovski =

Angelovski (Macedonian: Ангеловски) is a Macedonian surname meaning 'angel' and may refer to:

- Branislav Angelovski (b. 1977), Macedonian handball player
- Igor Angelovski (b. 1976), Macedonian footballer and current manager
- Nikola-Kole Angelovski (b. 1943), Macedonian actor and film director
- Strašo Angelovski (b. 1959), Macedonian politician
- Vladimir-Dadi Angelovski (1946–2012), Macedonian actor

== See also ==
- Angelov
