= Angelus (disambiguation) =

The Angelus is a Christian devotion.

Angelus, The Angelus or Angélus may also refer to:

== Arts and entertainment ==
=== Film and TV ===
- The Angelus (film), a 1937 British film starring Richard Cooper
- Angelus (film), a 2000 Polish film by Lech Majewski
- The Angelus (television programme), an Irish televisual institution

=== Music ===
- Angelus, a 1994 album by Milton Nascimento
- "Angelus" (song), a 2004 song by Hitomi Shimatani
- "Angelus", a song by Subway to Sally from the 2009 album Kreuzfeuer
- L'Angélus (band), a Cajun fiddle swing band from Louisiana

=== Other uses in arts and entertainment ===
- The Angelus (magazine), a monthly publication by the Society of St. Pius X
- Angelus (newspaper), the weekly magazine of the Roman Catholic Archdiocese of Los Angeles
- The Angelus (painting), by Jean-François Millet
- Angelus, the soulless past nature of the vampire Angel (Buffy the Vampire Slayer), from the television show Buffy the Vampire Slayer and its spin-off series Angel
- The Angelus (comics), female supernatural comics character published by Top Cow Productions
- Angelus, the fictional Western Australian town that is the setting for the Lockie Leonard trilogy of children's novels by Tim Winton and the eponymous TV series

== Places ==
- Angelus, Kansas, an unincorporated community in Sheridan County
- Angelus (Jennings, Louisiana), a historic house
- Angelus Temple, Los Angeles, California
- Angel Sar also known as Angelus, a mountain peak in Pakistan
- Maniniaro / Angelus Peak, a mountain in New Zealand

== Species ==
- Cisthene angelus, a moth of family Erebidae
- Omobranchus angelus, a fish of family Blenniidae
- Pygarctia angelus, a moth of family Erebidae

== People ==
- Angelus of Jerusalem (1185–1220), Catholic saint and martyr
- Andreas Angelus (1561–1598), German clergyman and teacher
- Angelus de Baets (1793–1855), Belgian painter
- Angelus of St. Francis Mason (1599–1678), English Franciscan friar and writer
- Angelus Silesius (1624–1677), German Catholic priest and physician
- Christopher Angelus (fl. 1608–1638), Greek-British writer
- John Angelus of Syrmia (c. 1193 – 1259), Byzantine prince
- Oskar Angelus (1892–1979), Estonian politician
- Paulus Angelus (disambiguation), several people
- Pete Angelus, American music manager

== Other uses ==
- Angelus, Latin for angel
- Angelus ad virginem, Latin carol on the Annunciation
- Angelus (dynasty), a member of the Byzantine noble and imperial house of the Angeloi
- Château Angélus, a Bordeaux wine producer of Saint-Émilion

== See also ==
- Angelos (disambiguation)
