= L'Angélus =

L'Angélus may refer to:

- Château Angélus, the Bordeaux wine from the appellation Saint-Émilion
- L'Angelus, the French name for 1859 oil painting The Angelus by Jean-François Millet
- L'Angélus (band), American band from Louisiana playing Cajun fiddle swing band

== See also ==
- Angelus (disambiguation)
