= Super 1 =

Super 1 may refer to:

- Super One (album), an album by SuperM
- Kamen Rider Super-1, a Japanese television series
- Super One Television, a former name of the Maltese television channel One
- Super 1 Foods (disambiguation), several supermarket chains
- Super One National Kart Championships, a British kart racing championship
