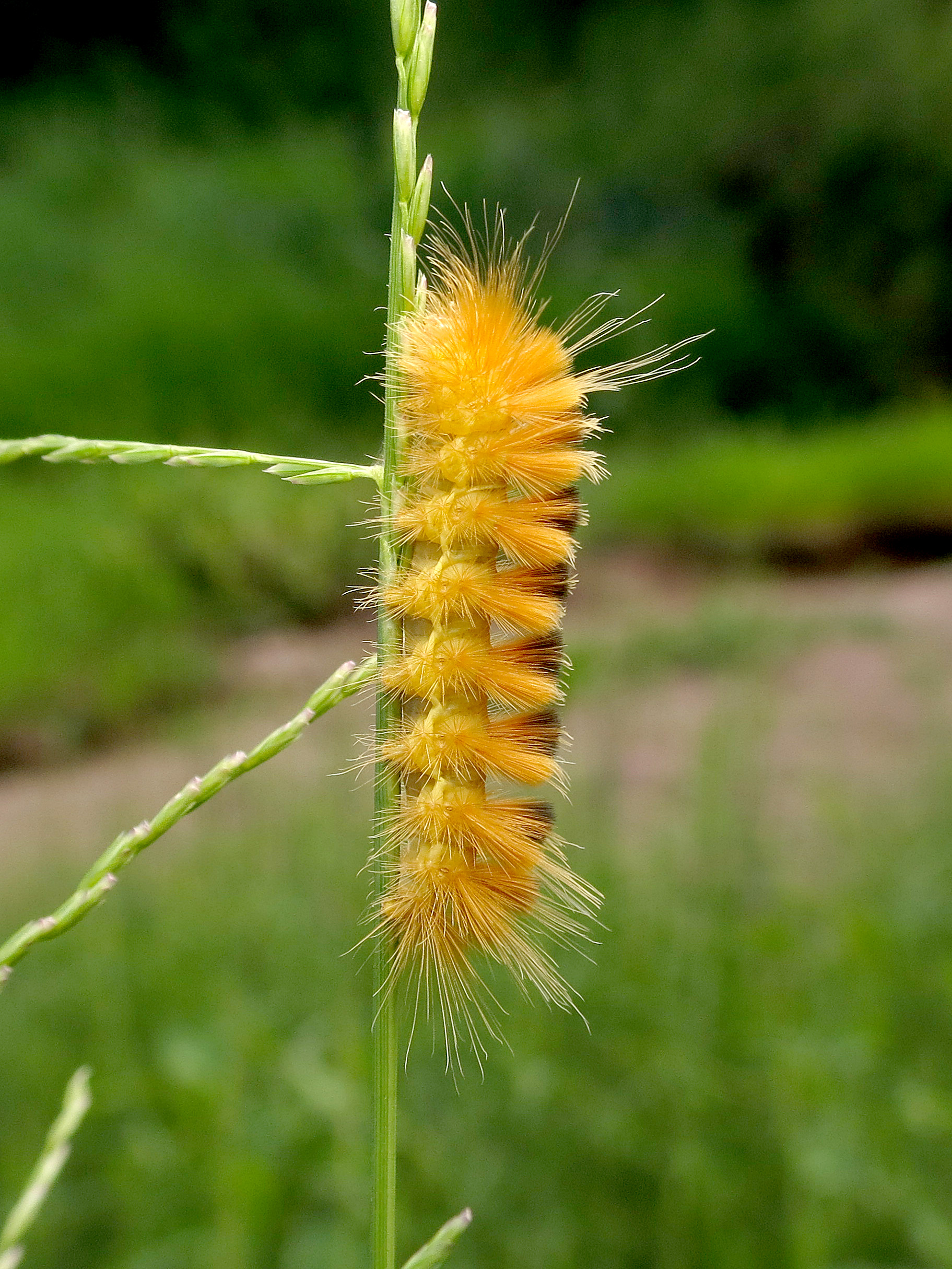
- Tiger Moth Caterpillar

Scientific classification
- Kingdom: Animalia
- Phylum: Arthropoda
- Class: Insecta
- Order: Lepidoptera
- Superfamily: Noctuoidea
- Family: Erebidae
- Subfamily: Arctiinae
- Genus: Pygarctia
- Species: P. roseicapitis

Binomial name
- Pygarctia roseicapitis (Neumoegen & Dyar, 1893)

Synonyms
- Cycnia elegans var. roseicapitis Neumoegen & Dyar, 1893; Euchaetes roseicapitis

= Pygarctia roseicapitis =

Species of moth

Pygarctia roseicapitis, the red-headed pygarctia moth, is a moth in the family Erebidae. It was described by Berthold Neumoegen and Harrison Gray Dyar Jr. in 1893. It is found in Mexico and in the United States from southern Arizona to Texas.

The length of the forewings is 14–17 mm. Adults are on wing from May to September.

The larvae feed on various Euphorbiaceae species, including Chamaesyce hyssopifolia. Full-grown larvae reach a length of about 30 mm.
