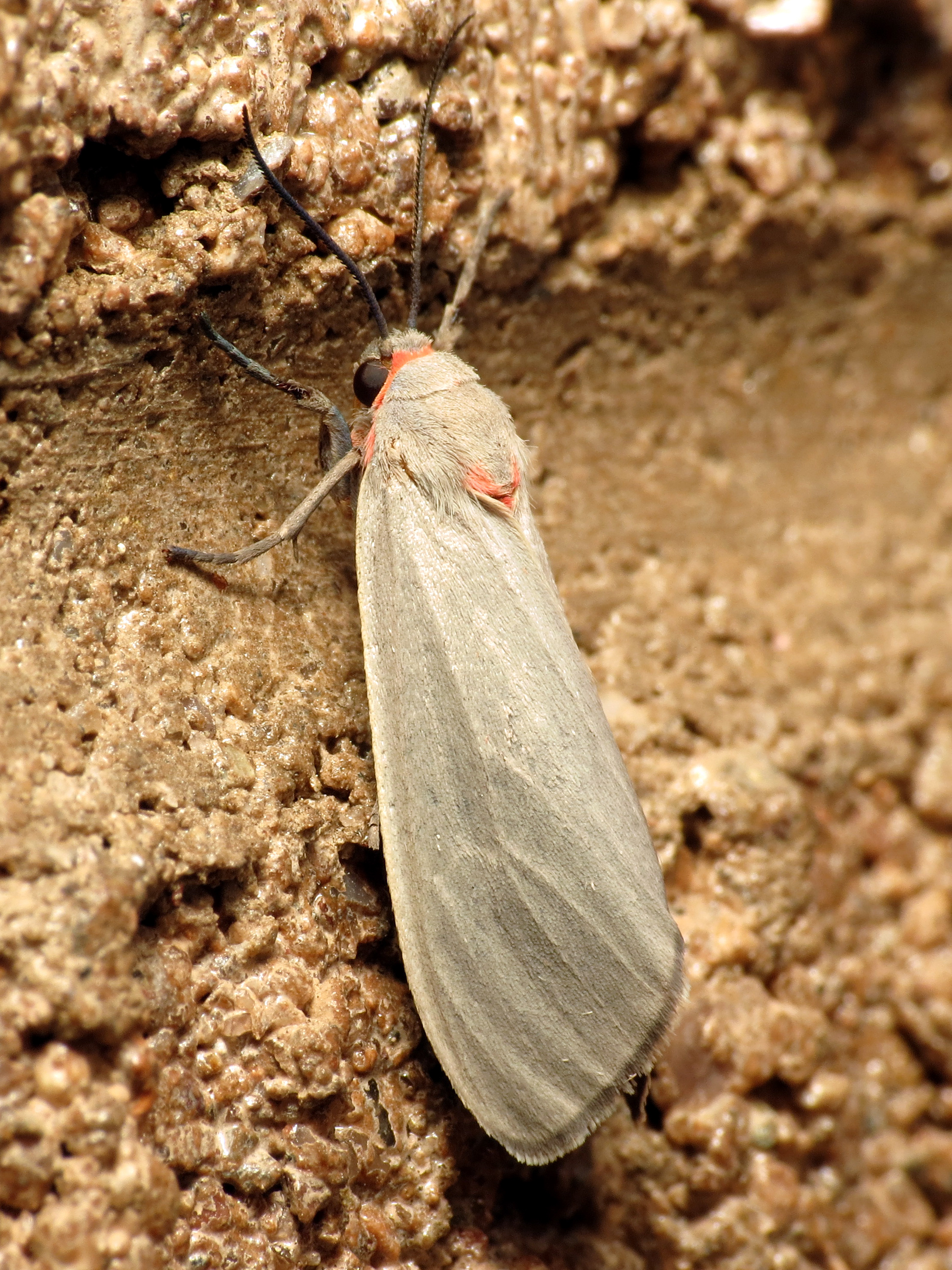
- Pygarctia murina. Texas Canyon Rest Area, Cochise County, Arizona, USA

Scientific classification
- Domain: Eukaryota
- Kingdom: Animalia
- Phylum: Arthropoda
- Class: Insecta
- Order: Lepidoptera
- Superfamily: Noctuoidea
- Family: Erebidae
- Subfamily: Arctiinae
- Genus: Pygarctia
- Species: P. murina

Binomial name
- Pygarctia murina (Stretch, 1885)

Synonyms
- Euchaetes murina Stretch, 1885; Pygarctia oslari Rothschild, 1910; Pygarctia poliochroa Hampson, 1916; Pygarctia murina albistrigata Barnes & McDunnough, 1913

= Pygarctia murina =

Species of moth

Pygarctia murina, the mouse-colored euchaetias, is a moth in the family Erebidae. It was described by Richard Harper Stretch in 1885. It is found in the United States in south-western Utah, from southern Colorado to south-eastern California and in southern Texas.

The wingspan is 26–33 mm. Adults are on wing from late July to September.

Larvae feed on Euphorbia species and have also been reared on Funastrum species. They reach a length of about 22 mm when fully grown. Pupation takes place in a silken cocoon within surface debris.
