= Pygarctia spraguei =

Scientific classification
- Kingdom: Animalia
- Phylum: Arthropoda
- Class: Insecta
- Order: Lepidoptera
- Superfamily: Noctuoidea
- Family: Erebidae
- Subfamily: Arctiinae
- Genus: Pygarctia
- Species: P. spraguei

Binomial name
- Pygarctia spraguei (Grote, 1875)

Synonyms
- Euchaetes spraguei Grote, 1875; Euchaetes conspicua Neumoegen, 1890

Species of moth

Pygarctia spraguei, also known as Sprague's pygarctia or Sprague's tiger moth, is a moth of the family Erebidae. It was described by Augustus Radcliffe Grote in 1875. It is found in North America from the Great Plains of southern Canada to Texas, westward to Utah, eastward to Indiana and Louisiana.

The wingspan is about 31 mm.

The larvae feed on Euphorbia species.
