= Pygarctia matudai =

Scientific classification
- Domain: Eukaryota
- Kingdom: Animalia
- Phylum: Arthropoda
- Class: Insecta
- Order: Lepidoptera
- Superfamily: Noctuoidea
- Family: Erebidae
- Subfamily: Arctiinae
- Genus: Pygarctia
- Species: P. matudai

Binomial name
- Pygarctia matudai (Beutelspacher, 1978)

Synonyms
- Euchaetias matudai Beutelspacher, 1978

Species of moth

Pygarctia matudai is a species of moth in the family Erebidae. It was described by Carlos Rommel Beutelspacher in 1978. It is found in Mexico.
