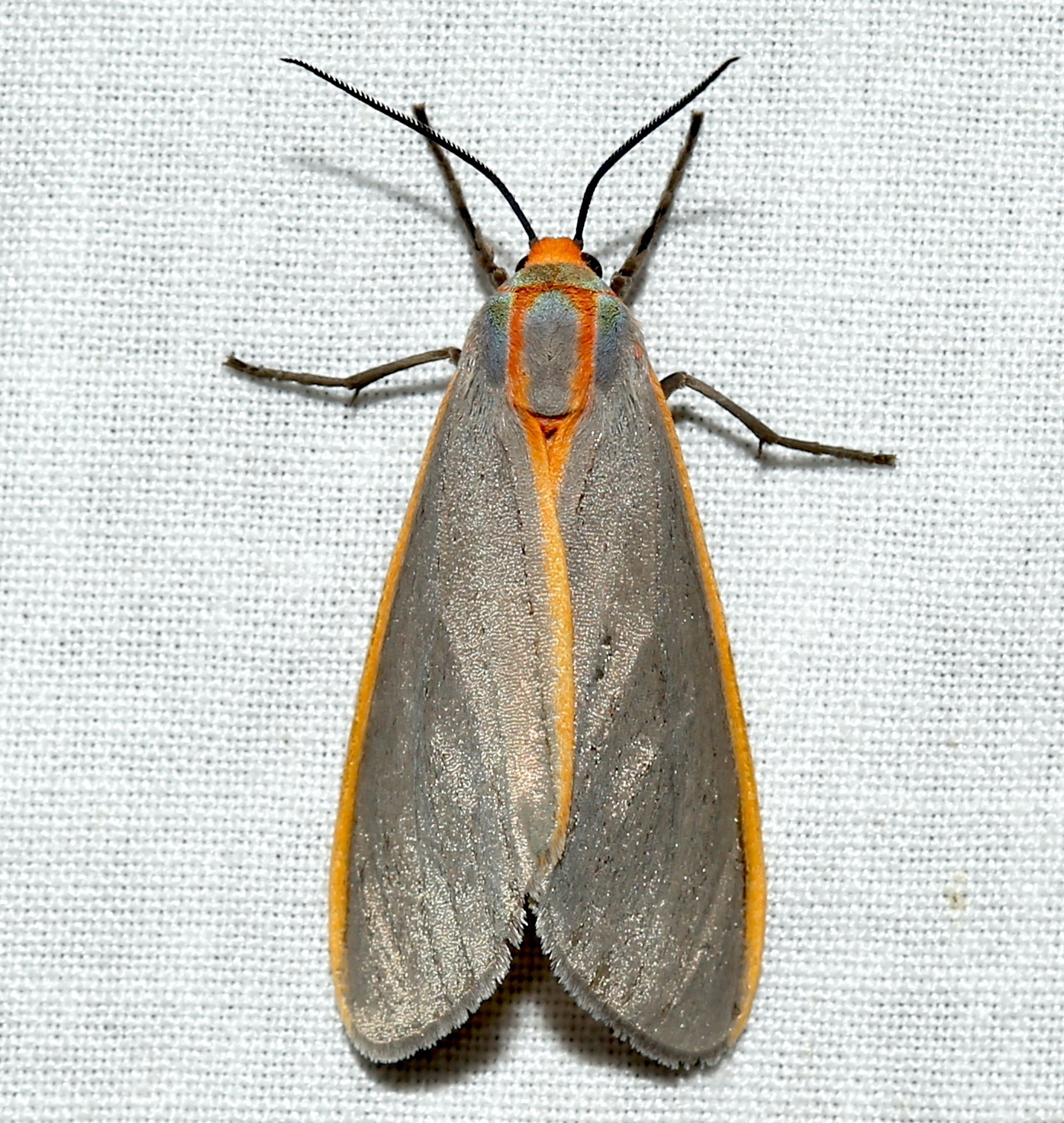

Scientific classification
- Kingdom: Animalia
- Phylum: Arthropoda
- Class: Insecta
- Order: Lepidoptera
- Superfamily: Noctuoidea
- Family: Erebidae
- Subfamily: Arctiinae
- Genus: Pygarctia
- Species: P. abdominalis

Binomial name
- Pygarctia abdominalis Grote, 1871

Synonyms
- Pygarctia grossbecki Davis, 1913

= Pygarctia abdominalis =

Species of moth

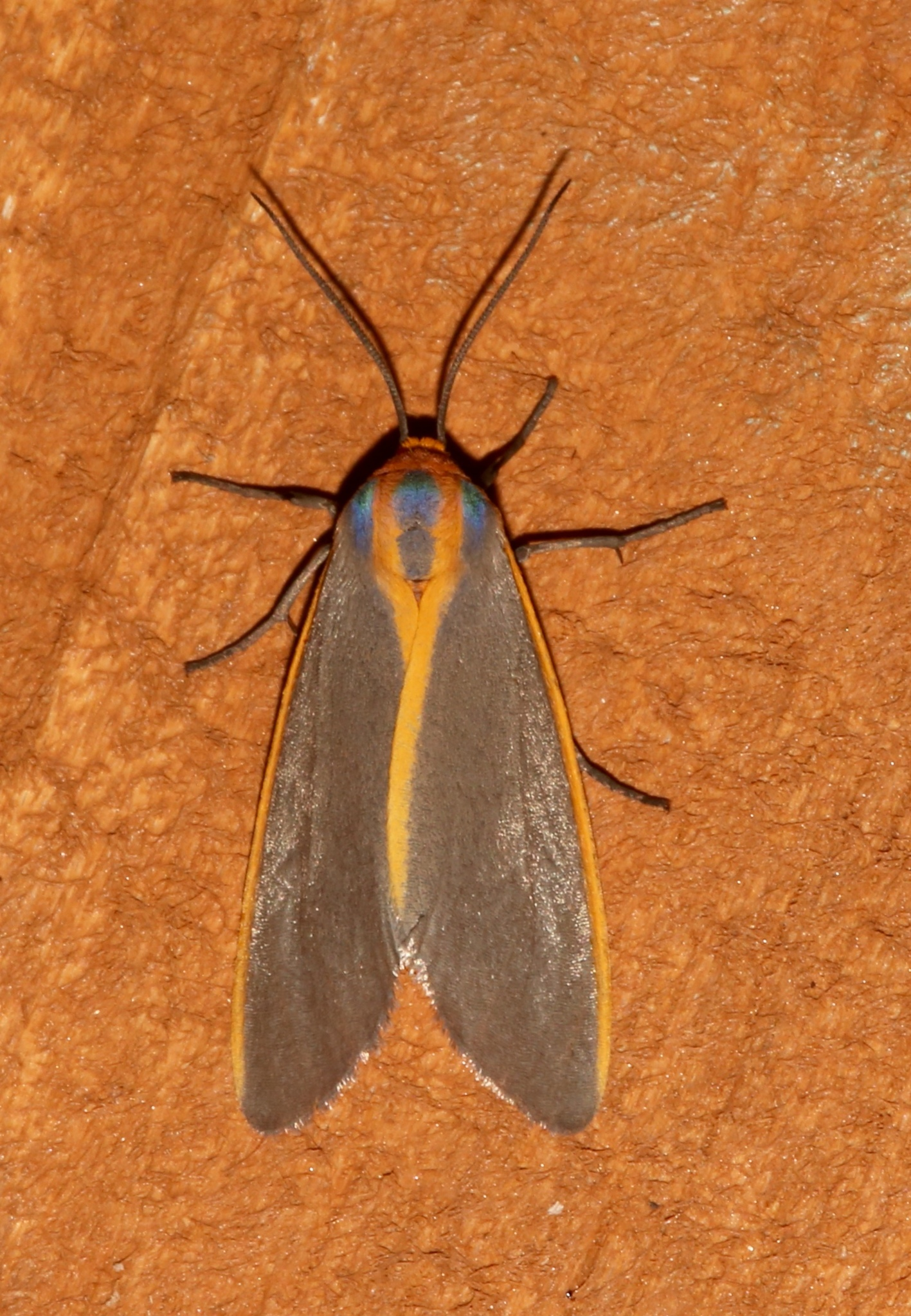
Pygarctia abdominalis

Pygarctia abdominalis, the yellow-edged pygarctia or orange-bodied pygarctia, is a moth in the family Erebidae. It was described by Augustus Radcliffe Grote in 1871. It is found in the United States from New Jersey south to Florida and west to Texas.

The wingspan is about 35 mm for males and 45 mm for females. Adults are most common from April to August. In Florida, adults have been recorded on wing in February, from April to June and from August to September.

The larvae have been reported feeding on Euphorbiaceae and Apocynaceae species.
