= Sant'Angelo =

Sant'Angelo (Italian lit. 'holy angel') is an Italian name for the Archangel Michael.

It may also refer to:

== Religion ==
- Sant'Angelo, the Italian name for Saint Angelus of Jerusalem
- Roman Catholic Diocese of Santo Ângelo, a Roman Catholic Diocese of Brazil

== Localities ==
=== Brazil ===
- Santo Ângelo, a city in Rio Grande do Sul state
- Santo Ângelo (micro-region), a micro-region in Rio Grande do Sul state

=== Italy ===
Municipalities (comuni)

- Castel Sant'Angelo, in the province of Rieti
- Città Sant'Angelo, in the province of Pescara
- Monte Sant'Angelo, in the province of Foggia
- Mosciano Sant'Angelo, in the province of Teramo
- Sant'Angelo a Cupolo, in the province of Benevento
- Sant'Angelo a Fasanella, in the province of Salerno
- Sant'Angelo a Scala, in the province of Avellino
- Sant'Angelo all'Esca, in the province of Avellino
- Sant'Angelo d'Alife, in the province of Caserta
- Sant'Angelo dei Lombardi, in the province of Avellino
- Sant'Angelo del Pesco, in the province of Isernia
- Sant'Angelo di Brolo, in the province of Messina
- Sant'Angelo di Piove di Sacco, in the province of Padua
- Sant'Angelo Le Fratte, in the province of Potenza
- Sant'Angelo in Lizzola, in the province of Pesaro and Urbino
- Sant'Angelo in Pontano, in the province of Macerata
- Sant'Angelo in Vado, in the province of Pesaro e Urbino
- Sant'Angelo Limosano, in the province of Campobasso
- Sant'Angelo Lodigiano, in the province of Lodi
- Sant'Angelo Lomellina, in the province of Pavia
- Sant'Angelo Muxaro, in the province of Agrigento
- Sant'Angelo Romano, in the province of Rome
- Valle dell'Angelo, in the province of Salerno
- Villa Sant'Angelo, in the province of L'Aquila

Buildings, districts and roads of Rome

- Borgo Sant'Angelo, a road in the Roman rione of Borgo
- Castel Sant'Angelo, a castle in Rome
- Sant'Angelo (rione of Rome), a rione of the City of Rome
- Teatro San Angelo, a theatre in Venice, which ran from 1677 until 1803

Civil parishes (frazioni)

- Sant'Angelo, Campania, in the municipality of Campagna in the Province of Salerno
- Sant'Angelo, Emilia-Romagna, in the municipality of Gatteo in the Province of Forli-Cesena
- Sant'Angelo, Rieti, in the municipality of Amatrice in the Province of Rieti, Lazio
- Sant'Angelo a Lecore, in the municipalities of Campi Bisenzio (FI) and Signa (FI)
- Sant'Angelo di Roccalvecce, in the municipality of Viterbo
- Sant'Angelo in Formis, in the municipality of Capua (CE)
- Sant'Angelo in Macerata, in the municipality of Mercato San Severino (SA)
- Sant'Angelo in Theodice, in the municipality of Cassino (FR)
- Sant'Angelo in Trigillo, in the municipality of Leonessa (RI)

Mountains, lakes and islands

- Sant'Angelo della Polvere, an island of Venetian Lagoon

=== Greece ===
- Castel Sant'Angelo, the Venetian name for Angelokastro (Corfu) castle

== See also ==
- Santangelo (disambiguation)
- Angelo (disambiguation)
- Angel (disambiguation)
- San Angelo, Texas, city in the United States
