= Pygarctia lorula =

Scientific classification
- Domain: Eukaryota
- Kingdom: Animalia
- Phylum: Arthropoda
- Class: Insecta
- Order: Lepidoptera
- Superfamily: Noctuoidea
- Family: Erebidae
- Subfamily: Arctiinae
- Genus: Pygarctia
- Species: P. lorula

Binomial name
- Pygarctia lorula Dyar, 1914

Species of moth

Pygarctia lorula is a moth in the family Erebidae. It was described by Harrison Gray Dyar Jr. in 1914. It is found in the US state of New Mexico.

The wingspan is 32–43 mm. Adults have been recorded on wing in July.
