= Pygarctia pterygostigma =

Scientific classification
- Kingdom: Animalia
- Phylum: Arthropoda
- Class: Insecta
- Order: Lepidoptera
- Superfamily: Noctuoidea
- Family: Erebidae
- Subfamily: Arctiinae
- Genus: Pygarctia
- Species: P. pterygostigma

Binomial name
- Pygarctia pterygostigma Dyar, 1909

Species of moth

Pygarctia pterygostigma is a moth in the family Erebidae. It was described by Harrison Gray Dyar Jr. in 1909. It is found in Mexico, and in the United States, in New Mexico and southern Texas.

The wingspan is about 28 mm. Adults are on wing from June to September.
