= Super 1 Foods =

Super 1 Foods can refer to several supermarket chains in the United States:

- Super 1 Foods, a chain owned by the Brookshire Grocery Company with stores in Texas, Louisiana and Arkansas
- Super 1 Foods, a chain owned by Rosauers with stores in the Northwest United States
- Super 1 Foods, a chain acquired and rebranded Albertsons
- Super One Foods, a chain with stores in Minnesota, Wisconsin, Michigan, and North Dakota
