= Angela (surname) =

Angela is an Italian surname. Notable people with the surname include:

- Alberto Angela (born 1962), Italian paleontologist, scientific popularizer, writer and journalist
- Carlo Angela (1875–1949), Italian doctor and Righteous Gentile
- Piero Angela (1928–2022), Italian Grand Officer OMRI, television host, science journalist, and pianist

== See also ==
- Angela (given name)
- Angela (disambiguation)
