= Angelo (disambiguation) =

Angelo is both a given name and a surname.

Angelo may also refer to:

== Places ==
=== Brazil ===
- Santo Ângelo, a city

=== United States ===
- Angelo, Wisconsin, a town
  - Angelo (community), Wisconsin, an unincorporated community
- San Angelo, Texas, a city

== Arts, entertainment, and media ==
- Angelo (band), a Japanese rock band
- Angelo (opera), a 1876 opera by César Cui, based on Victor Hugo's play
- Angelo (poem), by Pushkin
- "Angelo" (Brotherhood of Man song), 1977
- "Angelo" (Francesco Renga song), 2005 winning song at the Sanremo Music Festival
- Angelo, Tyrant of Padua, a 1835 play by Victor Hugo
- Avenging Angelo, a 2012 film
- Angelo (TV series), a 2017 Chinese television series

== See also ==
- Angel (disambiguation)
- Angela (disambiguation)
- Angelov
- Angel (given name)
- Angeli (disambiguation)
- Sant'Angelo (disambiguation)
- Angelos (disambiguation)
- Anghel
- D'Angelo (disambiguation)
