= Pygarctia haematodes =

Scientific classification
- Kingdom: Animalia
- Phylum: Arthropoda
- Class: Insecta
- Order: Lepidoptera
- Superfamily: Noctuoidea
- Family: Erebidae
- Subfamily: Arctiinae
- Genus: Pygarctia
- Species: P. haematodes

Binomial name
- Pygarctia haematodes Dyar, 1921

Species of moth

Pygarctia haematodes is a moth in the family Erebidae. It was described by Harrison Gray Dyar Jr. in 1921. It is found in Mexico.
