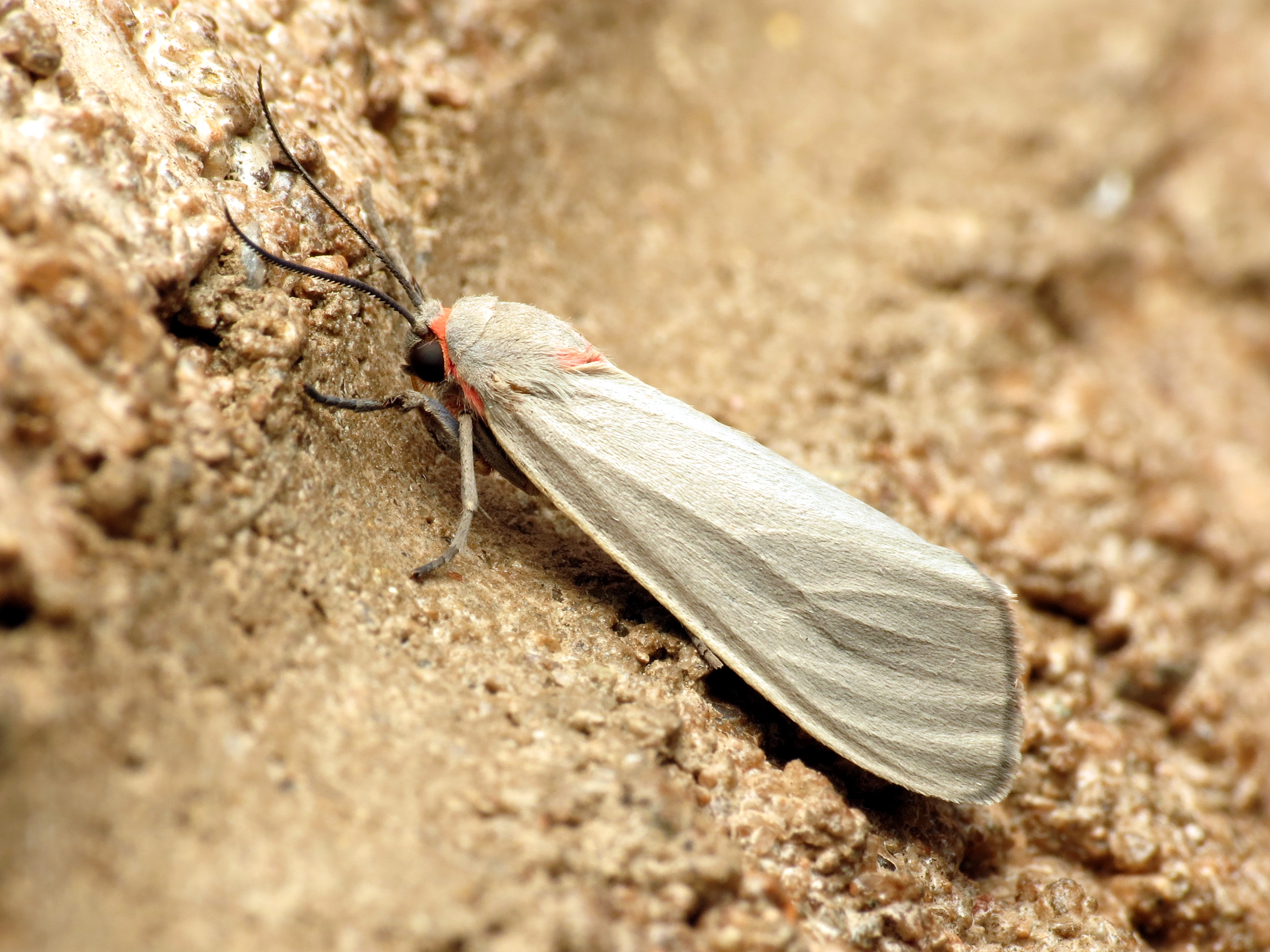
- Pygarctia murina

Scientific classification
- Kingdom: Animalia
- Phylum: Arthropoda
- Class: Insecta
- Order: Lepidoptera
- Superfamily: Noctuoidea
- Family: Erebidae
- Subfamily: Arctiinae
- Subtribe: Phaegopterina
- Genus: Pygarctia; Grote, 1871

= Pygarctia =

Genus of moths

Pygarctia is a genus of moths in the family Erebidae.

== Species ==
- Pygarctia abdominalis Grote, 1871 – yellow-edged pygarctia moth
- Pygarctia angelus (Dyar, 1907)
- Pygarctia eglenensis (Clemens, 1861)
- Pygarctia flavidorsalis Barnes & McDunnough, 1913
- Pygarctia haematodes Dyar, 1921
- Pygarctia lorula Dyar, 1914
- Pygarctia matudai (Beutelspacher, 1978)
- Pygarctia murina (Stretch, 1885)
- Pygarctia neomexicana Barnes, 1904
- Pygarctia pterygostigma Dyar, 1909
- Pygarctia roseicapitis (Neumoegen & Dyar, 1893)
- Pygarctia spraguei (Grote, 1875) – Sprague's pygarctia moth
