= Pygarctia flavidorsalis =

Scientific classification
- Domain: Eukaryota
- Kingdom: Animalia
- Phylum: Arthropoda
- Class: Insecta
- Order: Lepidoptera
- Superfamily: Noctuoidea
- Family: Erebidae
- Subfamily: Arctiinae
- Genus: Pygarctia
- Species: P. flavidorsalis

Binomial name
- Pygarctia flavidorsalis Barnes & McDunnough, 1913

Species of moth

Pygarctia flavidorsalis is a moth in the family Erebidae. It was described by William Barnes and James Halliday McDunnough in 1913. It is found in the US states of Arizona and Texas. There is also a record for Oklahoma.

The wingspan is about 30 mm for males and 32 mm for females. The wings and thorax are white. The head, abdomen and femora are orange. Adults have been recorded on wing in May, July and October.
