= Pygarctia neomexicana =

Scientific classification
- Domain: Eukaryota
- Kingdom: Animalia
- Phylum: Arthropoda
- Class: Insecta
- Order: Lepidoptera
- Superfamily: Noctuoidea
- Family: Erebidae
- Subfamily: Arctiinae
- Genus: Pygarctia
- Species: P. neomexicana

Binomial name
- Pygarctia neomexicana Barnes, 1904

Species of moth

Pygarctia neomexicana is a moth in the family Erebidae. It was described by William Barnes in 1904. It is found in the US states of Texas, Arizona, Colorado, New Mexico and Utah.

Adults are on wing from April to September.
