= Angelos (disambiguation) =

Angelos was a Greek noble lineage which gave rise to three Byzantine emperors who ruled between 1185 and 1204.

Angelos may also refer to:

== Notable people with the family name Angelos ==
- Constantine Angelos (c. 1093–1166), Byzantine admiral
- Andronikos Doukas Angelos (c. 1133 – before 1185), Byzantine military leader
- Alexios III Angelos (c. 1153–1211), Byzantine emperor
- Isaac II Angelos (1156–1204), Byzantine emperor
- Alexios IV Angelos (1182–1204), Byzantine emperor
- John I Doukas of Thessaly (c. 1240–1289), ruler of Thessaly, also known as John Angelos
- Andronikos Angelos Palaiologos (c. 1282–1328), Byzantine nobleman
- Alexios Angelos Philanthropenos (fl. 1373–1390), Byzantine nobleman
- Peter Angelos (1929–2024), American trial lawyer

== Notable people with the given name Angelos ==
- Angelos Akotantos, 15th-century Byzantine-Cretan icon-painter and hagiographer
- Angelos Anastasiadis (born 1953), Greek football head coach
- Angelos Basinas (born 1976), Greek footballer
- Angelos Charisteas (born 1980), retired Greek footballer
- Angelos Pavlakakis (born 1976), Greek sprinter
- Angelos Sikelianos (1884–1951), Greek poet
- Angelos Terzakis (1907–1979), Greek writer
- Angelos Chanti (born 1989), Greek footballer
- Angelos Vlachopoulos (born 1991), Greek water polo player

== Other ==
- Angelina (surname), feminine form of the family name Angelos
- Angelo, a male name
- Angelos (mythology), a deity in Greek mythology, possibly a daughter of Zeus and Hera
- Angelos, alternate name for the 1982 Greek film Angel

== See also ==
- Angelo (disambiguation)
- Angelus (disambiguation)
