= Nicole Miller =

American fashion designer and businesswoman

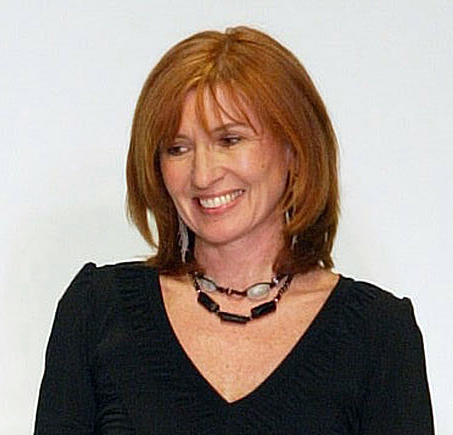
- Miller in 2003
- Born: Fort Worth, Texas
- Education: Rhode Island School of Design, Chambre Syndicale de la Couture Parisienne

Nicole Miller is an American fashion designer and businesswoman.

Miller attended the Rhode Island School of Design where she earned a BFA in Apparel Design. She studied for a year at L'Ecole de la Chambre Syndicale de la Couture Parisienne where she was trained to drape fabric and study the classical techniques of couture. Miller described her Parisian training as "intense", but explained that it gave her training in fabric manipulation, which became a signature of her designs.

Miller's first shop opened in 1986 on Madison Avenue. The brand has grown to 20 boutiques in major cities across the United States. and is sold in a number of high-end department stores. Miller designs an extensive collection for J.C. Penney and a home furnishing collection for Bed Bath & Beyond.

Of her style, the designer has said: "I've always been downtown and uptown. I've had a lot of artist friends and I was always a little bit of a renegade." Her modern design aesthetic is known for its bright prints and patterns.

== Early life ==
Miller was born in Fort Worth, Texas. Miller's father and her Parisian-born mother met in World War II. Her father was an engineer at General Electric. Her father was great influence on young Miller; she attributes her ability to make clothing to her father's engineer-like mind. Miller said: "The way you figure out how to make something is engineering."

Her mother, on the other hand, "hated" living in America and insisted on dressing her daughters in a French-influenced style. When Miller was asked by the Mattel toy company to design a Barbie doll, she claimed to have never owned a Barbie herself because her mother insisted that she and her sister play with French dolls. Since December 2009, Miller's Barbie has been featured in an ongoing exhibit, Barbie: The Fashion Experience, at The Children's Museum of Indianapolis.

== Early career ==
After completing studies at the L'Ecole de la Chambre Syndicale de la Couture Parisienne and graduating from the Rhode Island School of Design, Miller interned with dress designer Clovis Ruffin in New York City. Miller began working as head designer at P.J. Walsh, a dress manufacturer. There, she was hired by the president of the company, Bud Konheim. Konheim said one of the reasons he hired Miller was for her belief that design and business can be successful in combination. In 1982, Konheim started the company Nicole Miller with Nicole.

== Creative aesthetic ==
Her signature style has historically been black or boldly colored—with the cut of the clothes most important. Her main concern has always been proportions, curves and necklines. Her designs are known to be sexy, yet classic. She is a self-identified fabric junkie credited with popularizing many futuristic fabrics. Her styles range from body-conscious cocktail dresses, to wedding attire, to lounge wear, but she is best known for her form-flattering dresses and men's neckties.

Miller draws inspiration from a wide range of influences including mid-20th century cinema, contemporary art, mid-20th century architecture, and exotic cultures.

== Company ==
In 1986, Miller opened her first shop on Madison Avenue. Miller's fashion line launched in the mid-1980s with a conversational print men's tie collection that became a hit in the fashion world for a number of years. Miller made headlines in September 1998 by presenting her spring 1999 clothing line one week ahead of her French counterparts, becoming the first American to do so.

In 2002, Miller designed costumes for the Houston-based Stages Repertory Theatre production of García Lorca's "Blood Wedding",

In a departure from designing adult fashions, Miller designed a Sesame Street line of clothing for babies and toddlers in 2004. She also created a line of makeup products for Melaleuca.

Since 2005, Miller has designed a line of affordable clothes, handbags, footwear, fashion jewelry and other accessories for J.C. Penney. J.C. Penney credits this collaboration as result of extensive customer input. Miller also designs a home furnishings collection that is distributed through Bed Bath and Beyond.

Celebrities of varying ages including Anjelica Huston, Beyoncé Knowles, Angelina Jolie, Brooke Shields, LeAnn Rimes, Lauren Hutton, Jennifer Stone, Susan Sarandon and Eva Longoria have worn, and continue to wear, her designs. Miller designed clothes for singer Cyndi Lauper's world tour. She created gowns for Sheryl Crow to wear at the Grammys.

Miller and her partner, Kohnheim, have been in business together for over 28 years; the label has brought in $650 million in annual sales.

Currently, Miller's women's collection apparel is sold in more than 1,200 independent specialty stores and namesake boutiques in cities such as New York City, Los Angeles, Miami, Chicago, Atlanta, Philadelphia and in the affluent resort town of La Jolla. Her fashion line is also sold in department stores such as, Neiman Marcus, Saks Fifth Avenue, Bloomingdale's and Nordstrom.

In 2012, Miller joined the Fashion Advisory Board of Balluun.com, a fashion technology start-up focused on connecting fashion designers and retailers to conduct wholesale trade.

== Personal life ==
Miller and her husband, financier Kim Taipale, were married in 1996 by then-New York Mayor Rudolph Giuliani. They have one son and divide their time between New York City's Tribeca neighborhood and a weekend home in Sag Harbor, New York.

Miller is a member of the Council of Fashion Designers of America and serves on its board of directors. Nicole is an avid collector of contemporary art and French modern furniture. Her art collection includes work by Damien Loeb, John Stango, Ellen Gallagher, Andy Warhol and Le Corbusier.

== Television appearances ==
- Iron Chef (2009) as a guest judge.
- The Chopping Block (2009) as herself (Episode 3).
- Holland's Next Top Model (2006) as a guest judge (Season 1, Episode 7).
- America's Next Top Model (2004) as a guest judge (Season 3, Episode 7).
- The Apprentice (2004) as herself.
- Miss Universe Pageant (2002) as a guest judge.
- The Price Is Right (2011) as a guest presenter.
- Rocco's Dinner Party (2011) as a guest.
- Love Broker (2012) as herself.
- Miss USA 2023 (2023) as Telecast judge.

== Filmography ==
- "Picture Me" (2009). Directors: Sara Ziff and Ole Schell. A documentary about the inside world of modeling. Miller appears as herself.
