= Angela =

Angela may refer to:

== People ==
- Angela (given name), a feminine name, includes a list of people with the name
- Angela (surname), an Italian surname, includes a list of people with the name
- Angela (enslaved woman) (fl. 1619–1625), an African woman in the Colony of Virginia

== Places ==
- Angela, Montana
- Angela Lake, in Volusia County, Florida
- Lake Angela, in Lyon Township, Oakland County, Michigan
- Lake Angela, the reservoir impounded by the source dam of the South Yuba River
- Cape Angela, the northernmost point of Africa

== Music ==
- angela (band), from Japan
- Angela (album) by José Feliciano, 1976
- "Angela" (The Lumineers song), 2016
- "Angela" (Jarvis Cocker song), 2009
- "Angela" (Bee Gees song), 1987
- "Angela", a song by John Lennon and Yoko Ono from their album Some Time in New York City
- "Angela", a song by Mötley Crüe from Decade of Decadence
- "Angela", a song by Saïan Supa Crew from the album KLR
- "Angela", a song by Super Junior from Sorry, Sorry
- "Angela", a song by Toto from their self-titled album
- "Angela", the theme for the TV series Taxi by Bob James on his album Touchdown
- "Angela", a song by No Use For a Name from their album Hard Rock Bottom

== Films and TV ==
- Angela (1955 film), an American-Italian neo noir film by Dennis O'Keefe
- Angela (1978 film), a Canadian drama film by Boris Sagal
- Angela (1995 film), an American drama film by Rebecca Miller
- Angela (2002 film), an Italian crime drama film by Roberta Torre
- Angela (2023 film), a Brazilian drama film by Hugo Prata
- Angela, a 1928 musical starring Jeanette MacDonald, music and lyrics by Alberta Nichols and Mann Holiner
- Angel-A, a 2005 film
- Ángela (telenovela), a Mexican telenovela
- Angela (TV series), international title for the Philippines drama Haplos
- Angela (BoJack Horseman), a 2020 BoJack Horseman episode

== Other uses ==
- Angela (mantis), a genus of praying mantises

== See also ==
- Angie (disambiguation)
- Angel (disambiguation)
- Angeli (disambiguation)
- Angelo (disambiguation)
- Tropical Storm Angela (disambiguation)
