= Pygarctia eglenensis =

Scientific classification
- Kingdom: Animalia
- Phylum: Arthropoda
- Clade: Pancrustacea
- Class: Insecta
- Order: Lepidoptera
- Superfamily: Noctuoidea
- Family: Erebidae
- Subfamily: Arctiinae
- Genus: Pygarctia
- Species: P. eglenensis

Binomial name
- Pygarctia eglenensis (Clemens, 1861)

Synonyms
- Euchaetes eglenensis Clemens, 1861; Ammalo eglenensis; Pareuchaetes eglenensis; Euchaetes vivida Grote, 1882

Species of moth

Pygarctia eglenensis, the gray-winged pareuchaetes, is a moth in the family Erebidae. It was described by James Brackenridge Clemens in 1861. It is found in the US states of Texas and Florida.

Larvae have been recorded feeding on Asclepias species.
