= Santangelo =

Santangelo is an Italian surname and may refer to:

- Santangelo novels, a series of novels by Jackie Collins
  - Santangelo family, a fictional family from the novels

== People with the surname ==
=== Santangelo ===
- Alfred E. Santangelo (born 1912), American lawyer and politician
- Enrico Santangelo (born 1963), Italian author and art historian
- F. P. Santangelo (born 1967), American baseball player
- George Santangelo, American genomicist
- Mara Santangelo (born 1981), Italian tennis player
- Matt Santangelo (born 1977), American–Italian basketball player

=== Santángelo ===
- Duke of Santángelo, a hereditary title in the Peerage of Spain
- Jorge Cocco Santángelo (born 1936), Argentine painter and professor of art

== See also ==
- Elektra v. Santangelo, a 2005 court case
- San Angelo, Texas
- Sant'Angelo (disambiguation)
