= List of storms named Angela =

The name Angela has been officially used for three tropical cyclones in the western Pacific Ocean, and two in the Southern Hemisphere. Additionally, it was also used for a 19th-century typhoon, although its usage was unofficial.

In the western north Pacific, Angela was used on one of the old name lists:

- In 1867, a typhoon struck the Philippines which eventually became its fifth-deadliest; it was later unofficially called as the "Angela typhoon".
- Typhoon Angela (1989) (T8923, 26W, Rubing), struck the Philippines near peak strength, killing 119 people.
- Typhoon Angela (1992) (T9224, 24W), made landfall in Vietnam as a tropical storm.
- Typhoon Angela (1995) (T9520, 29W, Rosing), a powerful storm that killed hundreds in the Philippines and had its PAGASA name retired.

There were two cyclones named Angela in the Southern Hemisphere:

- Cyclone Angela (1966)
- Cyclone Angela (1972), passed near Cocos (Keeling) Islands and Christmas Island
