= Paulus Angelus (disambiguation) =

Paulus Angelus or Pal Engjëlli (1416–1470) was an Albanian bishop.

Paulus Angelus may also refer to:

- Pal Dushi or Paulus Angelus Dussus (died 1455), Albanian bishop of Drisht and of Shas
- Paolo Angelo Ballerini or Paulus Angelus Ballerini (1814–1897), Italian archbishop of Milan
