= Super One Foods =

American supermarket chain from Minnesota

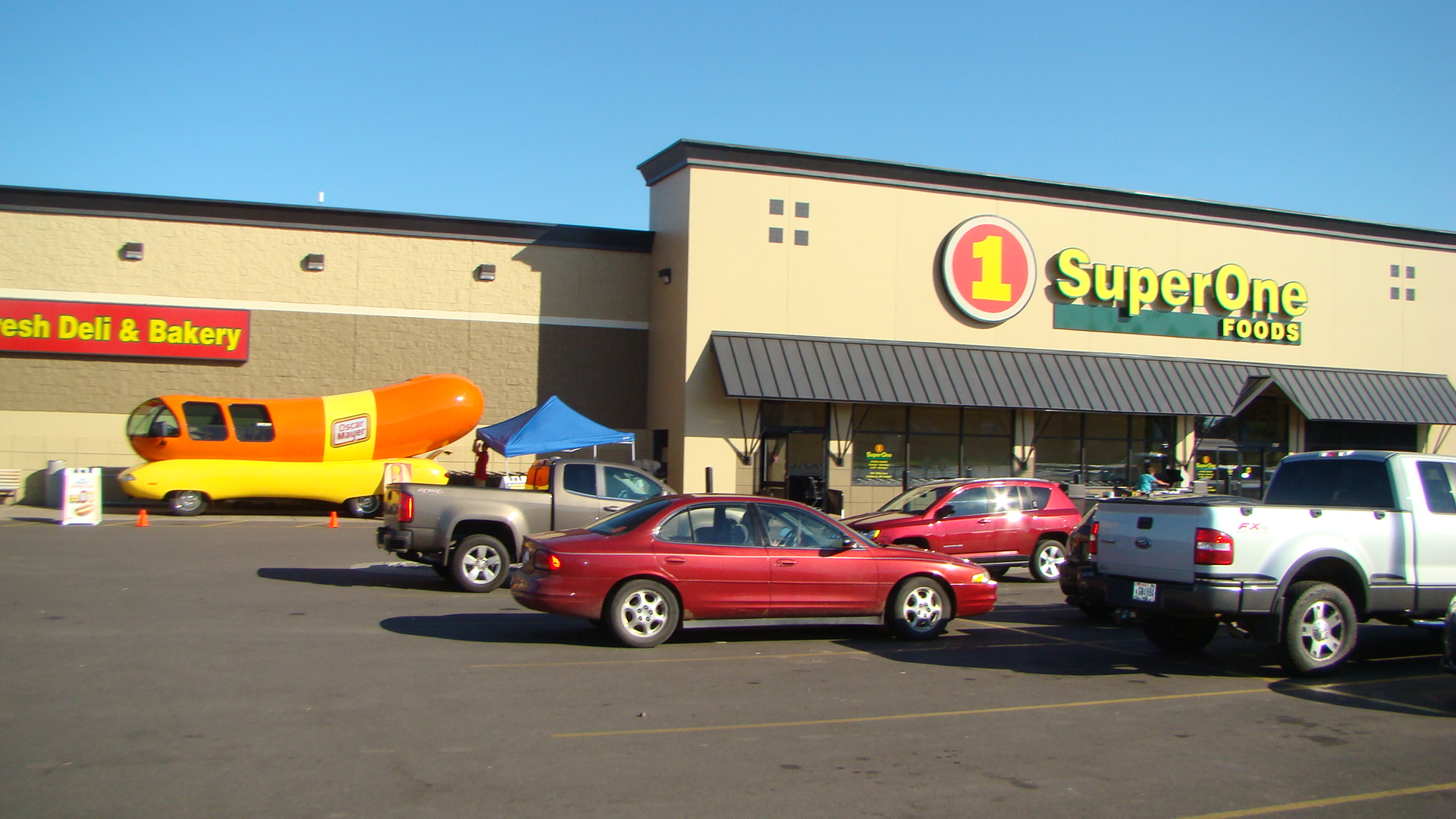
- A typical Super One store is visited by the Oscar Mayer Wienermobile.
- Company type: Private
- Industry: Retail (Grocery & Discount)
- Founded: 1943 (83 years ago) in Grand Rapids, Minnesota, U.S.
- Founder: Tony Miner; Ida Miner
- Headquarters: Hermantown, Minnesota, U.S. (near Duluth)
- Number of locations: 32
- Area served: Minnesota, Wisconsin, Upper Michigan
- Key people: Patrick Miner, President
- Products: Groceries, Specialty Foods, General Merchandise
- Services: Liquor, Smoke Shop
- Revenue: US$574 million (2015)
- Owner: Miner family
- Number of employees: 2,700 (2021)
- Parent: Miner's, Inc.
- Website: superonefoods.com

Super One Foods is an American supermarket chain, with 32 locations in Minnesota, Wisconsin, and the Upper Peninsula of Michigan. The chain is owned and operated by Miner's, Inc., a privately held company. A small number of the stores in the chain are branded as U-Save Foods, and a Duluth store is named Woodland Marketplace.

== History ==
In 1943, Tony and Ida Miner opened a tavern in Grand Rapids, Minnesota. When Tony noticed that many customers left early in the evening so they could buy their bread and milk before their nearby grocery store closed for the day, he added a milk cooler and bread to the items he sold. Thus was the beginning of their entry into the grocery business.

Tony and Ida built their first grocery store, Miner's Market, on the west side of Grand Rapids. By 1954, the family had added on to the original store and changed the name to Piggly Wiggly.

In 1963, the Miners opened their second store in Virginia, Minnesota. Two years later, the family moved to Duluth and opened a third store in Duluth's Woodland neighborhood. Shortly thereafter they made this location their headquarters because it was located close to one of their major suppliers.

Tony and Ida retired in 1975 and their son Jim became president of the company. Around this time, as the company was building a new warehouse in Duluth, the stores were re-branded with the name Super One. The store in Cloquet, Minnesota was the first to receive a Super One sign in 1977. Since then, many other Super One locations have been opened, with a current total of 32.

In 2014, a large store on East Second Street in Superior, Wisconsin was opened. The project was delayed for over a year while the owner of adjacent real estate near the proposed site refused to sell.

== Locations ==
As of 2022, there are 32 store locations and 10 liquor store locations. The most recently acquired store is the former Angeli Foods in Iron River, Michigan.

Most stores have an in-store bakery and deli.

== Charitable giving ==
Super One has supported charitable causes that promote the health, education, and the well being of the community it serves.

An example is a fundraiser that benefitted Solvay Hospice House in Duluth. According to organizers, more than $30,000 was raised for the hospice house. In addition, a local hospital foundation partnered with Super One for several years in a row and sold $1 ornaments.

== See also ==
- List of supermarket chains in the United States
