= Anghel Mora =

Anghel Mora (Romanian pronunciation: [ˈaŋɡel ˈmora]; the pen name of Mihai Diaconescu [miˈhaj djakoˈnesku]) was a film director, script writer, actor, poet, PR agency director, and folk musician from Romania.

Mora was born May 12, 1949 in Turnu Severin, and died on November 18, 2000 in Bucharest. He was a victim of the neo-communist rioting in Bucharest in 1990, the so-called mineriad. He was married to Maria Malitza (1957-2009), daughter of Mircea Malița, a diplomat and former minister of education of Romania.

== Movies directed ==
- Recorduri, lauri, amintiri (1984)
- Cununa de lauri (1985)
- Imn pentru primăvara țării (1986)
- Rezerva la start (1986)
- Kilmetrul 36 (1989)
- Flori de gheață (1989)

== Scripts ==
- Să mori din dragoste de viață (1983)
- Rezerva la start (1986)
- Kilmetrul 36 (1989)
- Flori de gheață (1989)

== Actor ==
- Șantaj (1981)
- Balanța (1992)

== Books ==
- Misivă între anotimpuri (1978), Ed. Cartea Românească
- Geometria iluziei (1986), Ed. Cartea Românească
- Oglinzile au două fețe, (short stories), Ed. Albatros
