= Darko Angelov =

Macedonian ambassador to Greece

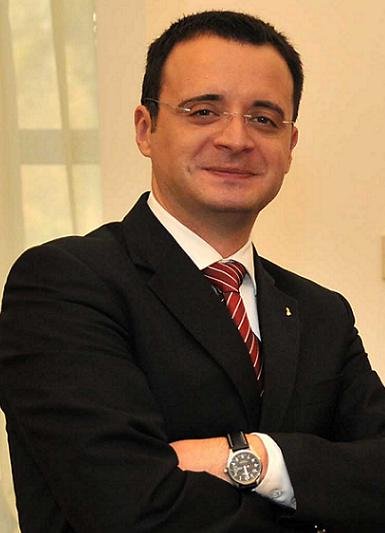
Ambassador Darko Angelov

Darko Angelov (Macedonian: Дарко Ангелов) is a former Macedonian ambassador to Greece. Previously, in 2014 he was briefly the foreign affairs adviser to the Prime Minister of the Republic of Macedonia. From 2010 to 2014, he was the ambassador of the Republic of Macedonia to Hungary and from March 2012, he was the first Macedonian, non-resident ambassador to Nigeria and the country's first ever ambassador assigned to Sub-Saharan Africa. In July 2012 Ambassador Angelov also took over the position of a non-resident ambassador to Kazakhstan.

== Biography ==
From May 2009 until March 2010, Ambassador Angelov served as the Secretary General (Chief of Staff) to the President of the Republic of Macedonia Dr. Gjorge Ivanov. From March 2008 to April 2009, he was the program advisor on the Russian Federation at the Council of Europe headquarters in Strasbourg on the Council's justice and home affairs cooperation with Russia. In 2007-2008 he worked as the senior political assistant at the Organization for Security and Co-operation in Europe OSCE Mission to Skopje, Macedonia, and prior, from 2004 to 2007, he was a program officer with the Council of Europe on regional justice and home affairs cooperation between the countries of the Western Balkans.

He has also briefly worked as an assistant analyst with the International Crisis Group and as an adviser on foreign media to the spokesperson of the Macedonian government (both in 2001).

Born in Skopje, Macedonia, Mr. Angelov received a Bachelor of Arts with Honors degree in political science and social geography from Utrecht University in the Netherlands and a Master of Arts degree in international relations and European studies from the Central European University in Budapest, Hungary; both degrees with a full, merit-based scholarship.

Darko Angelov was decorated by the President of Hungary with the Hungarian Order of Merit with a Commander's Cross for his service as Macedonia's ambassador to Hungary. He was also awarded the Career Achievement Alumni Award of the Central European University in Budapest for its twentieth anniversary in 2011 and was a Marshall Fellow with the German Marshall Fund of the United States in 2009. He is a founding member of the editorial board of "Crossroads", the Macedonian Foreign Policy Journal, where he has also written several analysis papers on foreign policy. Mr. Angelov is the author of "The New Era of European Defence: EU and NATO's Juxtaposition", as well as of numerous foreign policy papers published in Macedonian and foreign journals.

== See also ==
- Foreign relations of the Republic of Macedonia
