= Angeli Foods =

American grocery store chain

- Angeli Foods' logo
- Industry: Grocery store
- Founded: 1917; 108 years ago in Iron River, Michigan
- Defunct: May 2022
- Fate: Sold
- Successor: Super One Foods

Angeli Foods, also known as Angeli's Central Market or Angeli's Super Valu, was an American grocery store chain founded in Iron River, Michigan. Italian immigrant Alfred Angeli opened the first store in 1917, and the company grew to encompass several locations dotted across the Upper Peninsula of Michigan. Angeli Foods remained under family ownership for three generations until its sale in 2022.

== History ==
Italian immigrant Alfred Angeli founded Angeli Foods in 1917 at 402 W. Adams St. in the growing mining community of Iron River, Michigan. It was the first self-service grocery store to open in the Upper Peninsula of Michigan, the first to offer a frozen food locker, and the first to offer a five-day workweek. They were also the Upper Peninsula's first independent retailer to offer profit sharing and medical insurance.

Early in Angeli Foods' existence, it delivered groceries around Iron River using a 1924 Ford Model TT truck. They retained the vehicle as an in-store display after it was retired. According to the company's official history, over the next few decades Angeli Foods branched into several other industries, including a 2,000-acre (810 ha) farm, the Iron Inn hotel, a feed warehouse, and pet supplies. (Note: The Iron Inn was described by the Escanaba Daily Press as Iron River's "leading" lodging establishment and purchased by Angeli in the late 1930s.)

After Alfred Angeli's death in 1950, his grocery store remained within the family for two more generations. Alfred's son Libero worked quickly to build a new Iron River store location, on which construction began in 1953.

Under Libero, Angeli Foods continued expanding into the 1990s. They helped develop and anchored Riverside Plaza, Iron River's first shopping center, constructing a 24,000-square-foot (2,200 m^{2}) location a short distance east of the town. By 1973, Angeli Foods was grossing $7.4 million in revenue, and Libero won the Small Business Administration's "Small Businessman of the Year for Michigan" award for his work in developing the Upper Peninsula. By the 1990s, Angeli Foods had opened or acquired several other stores in the region, including:

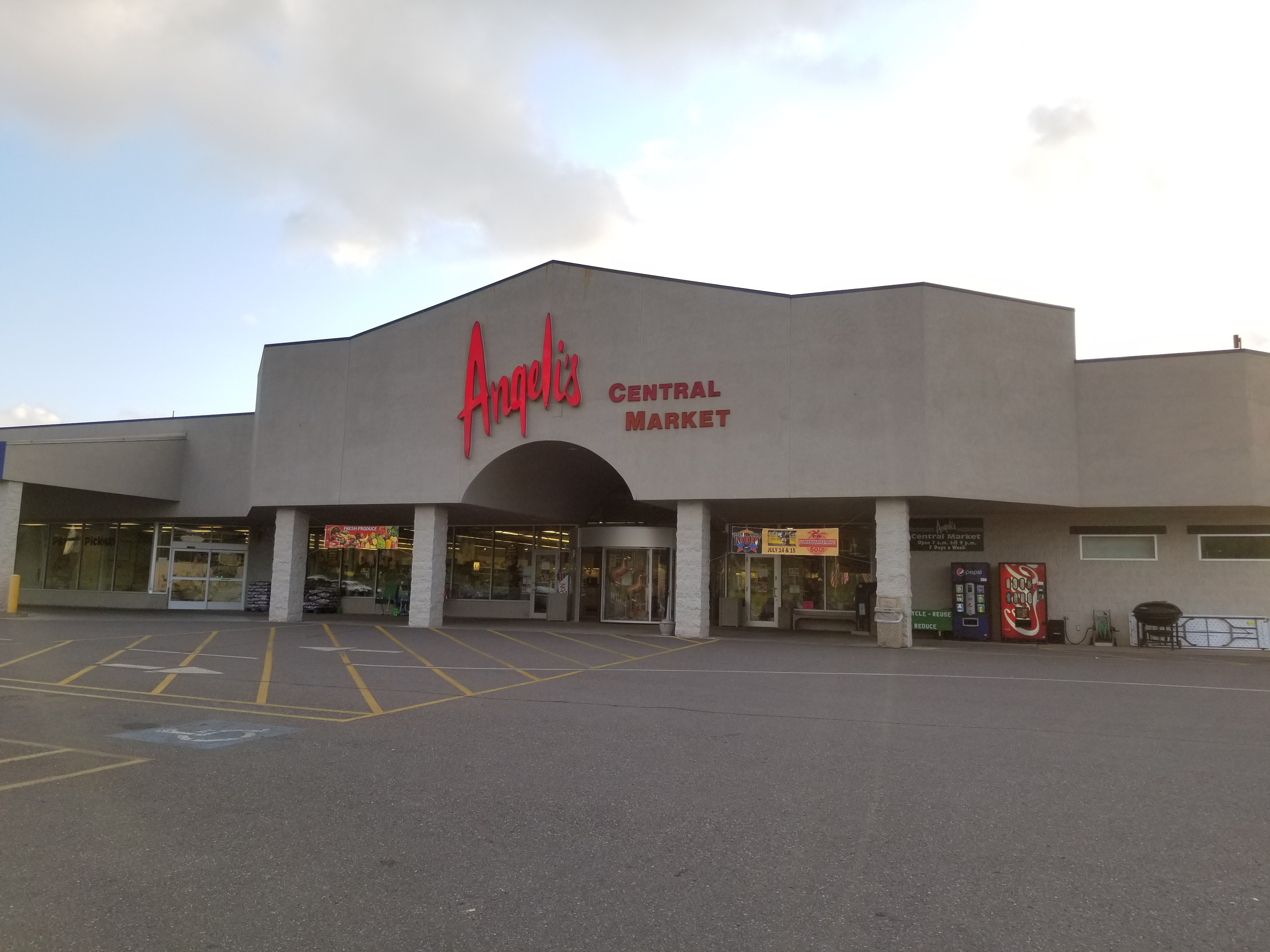
Angeli Foods' Iron River store at the Riverside Plaza, July 2017

- Menominee, Michigan:
  - A 12,500-square-foot (1,160 m^{2}) store, opened in 1967 or 1972; it was closed in the course of opening a larger location
  - A 48,000-square-foot (4,500 m^{2}) store, opened in the M&M Plaza in 1983 as a SuperValu County Market; it was later expanded to 72,000 square feet (6,700 m^{2})
- Marinette, Wisconsin: a 45,000-square-foot (4,200 m^{2}) store along Roosevelt Road that opened in 1992; it would eventually include an associated gas station
- Escanaba, Michigan: a Kitchen-Pantry convenience store at 1505 Washington Ave

In 2013, third-generation owner Fred Angeli was given the Michigan Grocers Association's first Al Kessel Outstanding Achievement Award. In the following year, Angeli Foods began offering organic food at their store in Menominee. They sold their grocery locations in Menominee and Marinette to Jack's Fresh Market in 2016, and the Marinette gas station by 2017, leaving only their original Iron River location.

As of 2019, the last remaining Angeli Foods store in Iron River employed over a hundred people with additional temporary workers taken on during the busier summer. The location was known for its unusually expansive array of Italian products. Explorer's Guide had previously lauded the store as an "extraordinary market", and added that its variety of fresh food options seemed "entirely out of place for tiny Iron River." Non-grocery operations included an attached Verizon mobile phone store, a UPS parcel drop-off and pick-up location, dry cleaning, a Stormy Kromer outlet center, and a sporting goods store. The latter replaced an Angeli-run video rental store in 2017 due to a rise in video streaming.

At the beginning of the 2020 COVID-19 pandemic in the United States, Angeli Foods worked with volunteers to allow customers to phone in their orders for contactless pickup at the store. A year later, it launched a website where customers could order their groceries for later pickup.

=== Related businesses ===
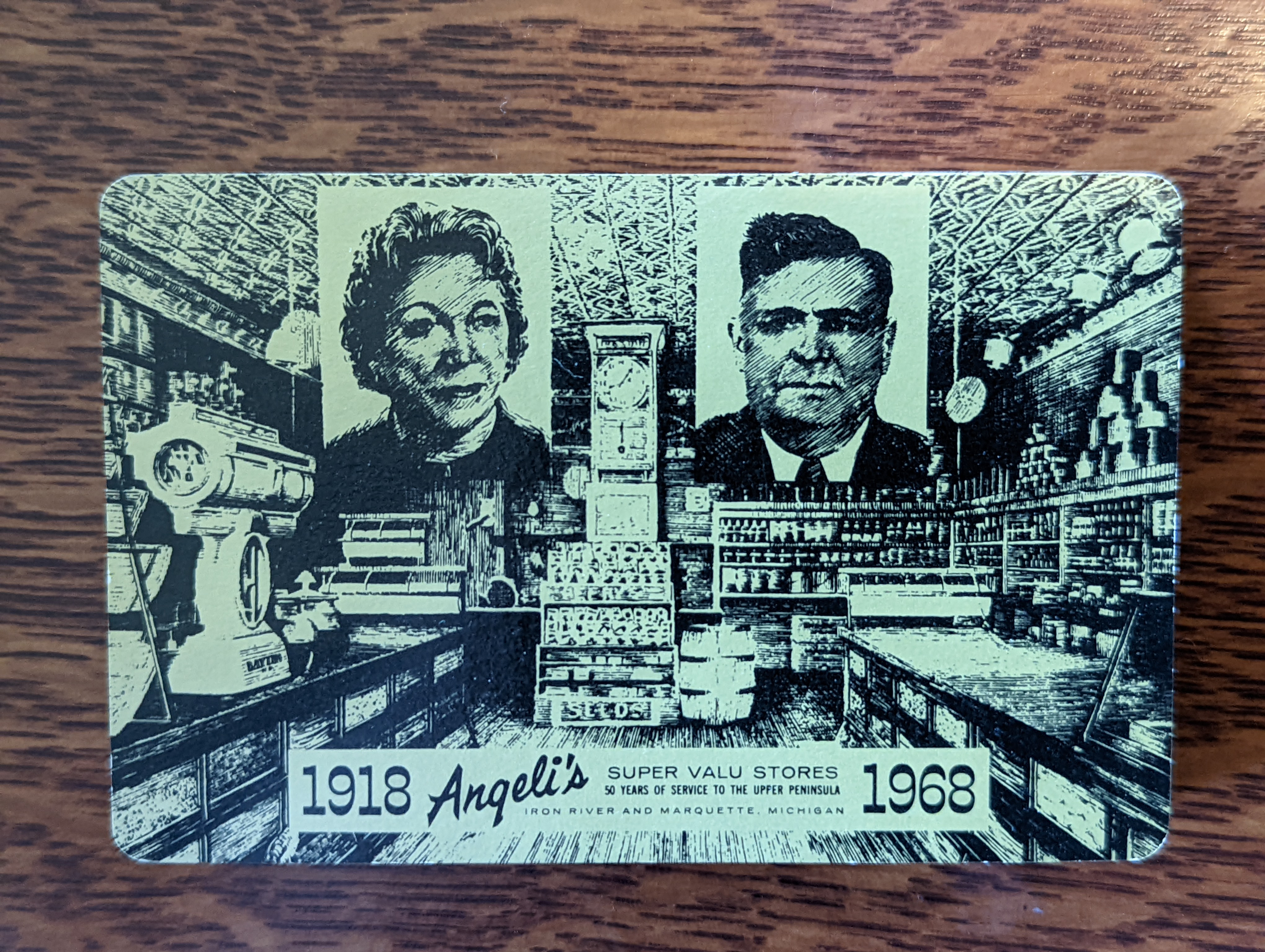
Angeli Foods commemorative playing cards, c. 1968

Mike Leonard Angeli, part of a separate branch of the Angeli family, opened an Angeli grocery store in Marquette, Michigan in 1959. The 11,000-square-foot (1,000 m^{2}) building was located near the intersection of Washington and 7th Streets. (Note: The building would go on to be the home of Northland Grocery and the Marquette Food Co-op.) This location closed in 1975 after Angeli became a founding and anchor tenant in the Marquette Mall complex. Angeli's new purpose-built mall store was 25,000 square feet (2,300 m^{2}) large and carried SuperValu branding. It opened in 1973 and closed due to an increasingly competitive local grocery scene in 1989.

== Sale ==
On 15 March 2022, Angeli Foods announced that it had reached a tentative agreement to sell itself for an undisclosed amount to Miner's, Inc., the owner and operator of Super One Foods, a chain of grocery store located in the Upper Peninsula of Michigan, Wisconsin, and Minnesota. As part of the arrangement, Angeli's last extant store in Iron River would be rebranded and become the thirty-second Super One. The sale concluded in May, and the store was closed for a day to begin the changeover.
