= John Stango =

American artist (born 1958)

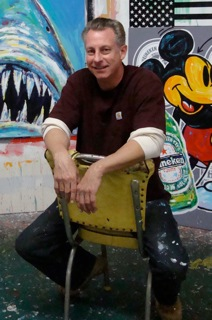
- Born: August 9, 1958 (age 67); Philadelphia, Pennsylvania, United States
- Education: Bachelor of Fine Arts, Tyler School of Art at Temple University
- Known for: Printmaker, artist, painter
- Movement: Pop art

John Stango (born August 9, 1958) is an American pop artist.

== Biography ==
Born and raised in urban Philadelphia, Stango attended Tyler School of Art at Temple University and graduated with a Bachelor of Fine Arts in Painting and Graphic Design. After graduation, Stango was hired by Macy's and Bloomingdale's department stores as a visual merchandiser and display artist. Later, Stango began to create silk screen T-shirts. Eventually he turned his attention and energy to painting full-time.

Currently he works out of a historic warehouse outside of Philadelphia. Stango paints in the vein of such artists as Andy Warhol, Jean-Michel Basquiat, Robert Rauschenberg, Roy Lichtenstein, LeRoy Neiman, and Peter Max. Newspapers, retro advertising, pop icons, B-movies, mid-century modernism, magazines, noir films, vintage signage and pop-culture inspire his works. Batman and Elvis, Audrey Hepburn and Lucky Strike, and Mickey Mouse and Heineken are some of the well-known subjects of Stango's paintings.

== Career ==
His paintings are shown in galleries across America, as well as in other countries including Sweden and Japan. His work has been purchased by a number of notable individuals such as Nicole Miller, Allen Iverson, Adam Marks in 2003, and Governor Ed Rendell, and Swizz Beatz. In addition to selling his art, John also engages in philanthropy, using his paintings and proceeds to benefit charities.

Washington Post arts reporter Mark Jenkins wrote in a July 18, 2015 article, "In the world that Andy Warhol, Jasper Johns, Robert Rauschenberg and Roy Lichtenstein wrought, is it still possible to be a pop artist? Some may doubt it, but not John Stango." Jenkins draws out the similarities and differences between Stango's work and the works of his biggest influences. "Stango depicts such mid-'60s idols as John F. Kennedy, Muhammad Ali and Marilyn Monroe – as well as superheroes and commercial insignias – with a mixture of reverence and giddiness," Jenkins writes. "Where Warhol did Brillo boxes and Campbell's soup cans, his successor goes for Cadillac, Chanel, Abolut – and Campbell's soup cans." Stango's mother, Frances Rockwell, and his cousin, famed American artist Norman Rockwell, would be proud.

=== Stewardess series ===
These works depict retro stewardess, employing such titles as "The Stewardess", Playgirl After Dark", "Southern Comfort". Most are titled after current day stewardess, notably Wendy, Judi, Ginger, Mimi, Buttercup, Kori, and Patrick (depicted as a female in the painting and dedicated to a cross-dressing steward[ess]). Judi was painted in honor of Judi Martino, a true '50s and '60s stewardess and the wife of singer Al Martino. John plans to continue this series especially following the popularity of ABC's Pan Am.
