= Amedeo Angeli =

Italian bobsledder (1911–1965)

Personal information
- Nationality: Italian
- Born: 6 July 1911; Mariano del Friuli, Austria-Hungary
- Died: 9 August 1965 (aged 54); Cortina d'Ampezzo, Italy

Sport
- Sport: Bobsleigh

Amedeo Angeli (6 July 1911 – 9 August 1965) was an Italian bobsledder who competed in the mid-1930s. He competed in the four-man event at the 1936 Winter Olympics in Garmisch-Partenkirchen, but did not finish.
