= Alessandro Defilippi =

Italian writer and screenwriter

Alessandro Defilippi is an Italian writer and screenwriter.

Born in Turin, he works as a psychoanalyst. His published works include the gothic tales collection Una lunga consuetudine (Sellerio, 1994) and two novels, Locus Animae (Passigli, 1999), a psychological thriller, and Angeli (Passigli 2002), a gothic novel with themes of mysticism, politics, ethics and philosophy.

He also worked on the screenplay for Prendimi l'anima, directed by Roberto Faenza, and has written poetry.

== Bibliography ==
- Una lunga consuetudine (1994)
- Locus animae (1999)
- Angeli (2002)
- Cuori bui, usanze ignote (2006)
- Le Perdute Tracce Degli Dei (2008)
- Manca sempre una piccola cosa (2010)
- Danubio rosso. L'alba dei barbari (2011)
- Onryo, avatar di morte (2012)
- Per una cipolla di Tropea (2012)
- La paziente n° 9 (2009)
- Giallo panettone (2012)
- Il teorema dell'ombra (2014)
