= Strašo Angelovski =

Macedonian politician

Strašo Angelovski (Macedonian: Страшо Ангеловски, born 5 August 1959 in Skopje) is a Macedonian politician. He is the current leader of the Right-wing political party MAAK-Conservative Party–Macedonian Action and previously led the MAAK - United Macedonian Option (MAAK - EMO) and TMORO-VEP (Tatkovinska Makedonska Organizacija za Radikalna Obnova - VARDAR EGEJ PIRIN).

In 2001 he organised demonstrations which blocked the entrance to the National Assembly of the Republic of Macedonia, delaying a session by six hours, in protest to the Ohrid Accord between ethnic Albanian insurgents and the government.
