= Antonio Stango =

Italian political scientist

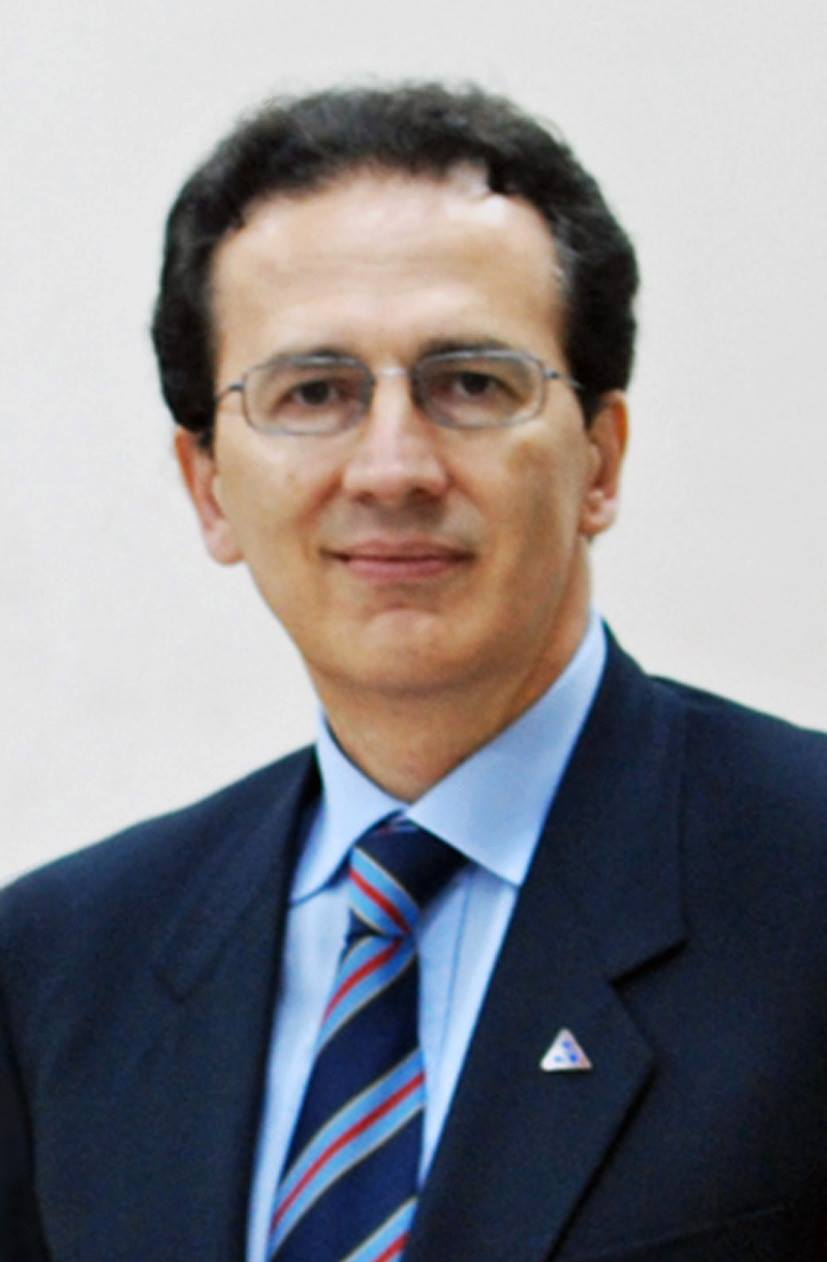
- Born: 24 September 1957 (age 68); Naples, Italy
- Education: University of Genoa
- Occupations: Political scientist, human rights expert, writer, editor
- Known for: President of the Italian Federation for Human Rights

Antonio Stango (born 24 September 1957) is an Italian political scientist, expert of human rights at international level, writer and editor. After leading several non-governmental organizations, he is currently the President of the Italian Federation for Human Rights.

== Biography ==
After having completed the first two years of high school (humanities) at the "Giandomenico Cassini" lyceum, based in Sanremo, he completed the courses at the Nunziatella military academy of Naples. He successively served as second lieutenant in the Italian Army. After having interrupted his military career, he graduated in Political Sciences at the University of Genoa, and obtained a Master in Modern history.

Since the 1980s, he was an activist in the area of human rights at international level, and collaborated with several non-governmental organizations and the Transnational Radical Party. In 1986, he was involved in the case of Severina and Michaela Filipov, young daughters of two Bulgarian refugees in Italy, that were retained in their home country by the local authorities. The following year, as Federal Secretary of the Italian Radical Party, he presided the meeting "Human rights and dissense in the Gorbaciov era", at the end of which the soviet dissidents Vladimir Bukovsky, Leonid Plyushch, Vladimir Maximov and Anatoly Levitin-Krasnov launched the Rome Manifesto of the soviet dissidents, claiming for the acknowledgement of human rights in the Soviet Union. In 1987, he founded with Paolo Ungari the Helsinki Committee for Human Rights, and took position against the repressions in Romania acted by the dictator Nicolae Ceaușescu. In the following years, he continued his activity in favour of human rights, especially in the countries of the former Soviet area, by founding relationships with oppositors of the communist regime as Václav Havel; being arrested by the East Germany police during a manifestation against the Berlin Wall; and by the soviet police during a manifestation in Moscow.

During the years, he was a member of the board of directors of the International Helsinki Federation for Human Rights, in FoReF (Forum for Religious Freedom), in the international committee of "In Search of Justice", in "Non c'è pace senza giustizia" and other non-governmental organizations. He also followed for many years the United Nations Human Rights Council in Geneva also as representative of the Partito Radicale Nonviolento, Transnazionale e Transpartito, which has the status of consulting entity at the United Nations Economic and Social Council.

He performed missions as a human rights expert for the European Commission and he lectured about human rights in several European, Central Asia and Middle East countries. Between December 2003 and July 2006 he directed the project Human Rights Training and Support in Kazakhstan for Freedom House.

Between 2002 and 2003 he was a member of the working group for the education to human rights for the Euro-Mediterranean Human Rights Network. In 2003, he was an expert for per il progetto della International Helsinki Federation for human rights, financed by the European Commission, The juridical protection of human rights in the Russian Federation, performing missions in Sakhalin and in the Russian far east region. He lectured about human rights in Italy, Kazakhstan, Uzbekistan and Lebanon, collaborating with different universities, non-governmental organizations, and other institutional bodies; and he was a consultant at the European Parliament, so as for the Italian Parliament and Senate. He founded and directed the magazines Confronto con l’Est (1982-1988), La Nuova Frontiera – International Human Rights and Security Review (1995-2003) and La Scrittura (1996-2002).

He is a member of the board of directors of Hands Off Cain, whose mission is the ban of the death penalty at worldwide level. In September 2015 he was appointed by the French non-governmental organization Ensemble Contre la Peine de Mort as the coordinator of the Worldwide Congress against the Death Penalty (Oslo, 21–23 June 2016). From October 2017 he is the President of the Italian Federation for Human Rights (www.fidu.it), for which he has conducted monitoring and advocacy mission in several countries. In 2021 he coordinated the project "Voices of Kazakhstan", supporting freedom of association and expression in that country (https://rus.azattyq.org/a/31017613.html).

On 12 March 2016, he was a lecturer at the TEDx conference of Arezzo on the issue of the death penalty. In addition to his activities in defence of the human rights, he is founder and owner of the eponym editorial company, whose activities are in the field of book editing, cultural magazines publishing, local information and event promotion.
