= Pygarctia angelus =

Scientific classification
- Kingdom: Animalia
- Phylum: Arthropoda
- Clade: Pancrustacea
- Class: Insecta
- Order: Lepidoptera
- Superfamily: Noctuoidea
- Family: Erebidae
- Subfamily: Arctiinae
- Genus: Pygarctia
- Species: P. angelus

Binomial name
- Pygarctia angelus (Dyar, 1907)

Synonyms
- Calidota angelus Dyar, 1907

Species of moth

Pygarctia angelus is a moth in the family Erebidae. It was described by Harrison Gray Dyar Jr. in 1907. It is found in Mexico.
