= Francesco degli Angeli =

Italian Jesuit missionary to Ethiopia

Francesco Degli Angeli (or Angelis) (Sorrento, 1567 – Colela, Ethiopia, 21 October 1628) was an Italian Jesuit missionary to Ethiopia.

== Life ==
He entered the Society of Jesus in 1583. After two years (1602–04) spent in the mission of the Indies, he travelled to Ethiopia, where they called him "the man who was always cheerful".

Angeli stood high in the favour of two successive Kings of Ethiopia. He made converts, among them the brother of the King and lords of the court, but did not succeed in bringing about the reunion of the Abyssinian Church with the Roman Catholic Church, because of opposition from Ethiopian monks.

For five years Angeli preached the Gospel among the Agazi where he founded a church and school.

== Works ==
He translated many religious works into the language of the Agazi. The most important of them was the commentary of Maldonatus on the Gospel of Matthew and Gospel of Luke.
