= Angelica vestis =

Religious garment

Angelica vestis, in English and European antiquity, was a monastic garment that laymen wore a little before their death, that they might have the benefit of the prayers of the monks.

It was from them called Angelical, because they were called Angeli, who by these prayers animæ saluti succurrebant. Thus, where we read the phrase ad succurrendum in old books, it must be understood of one who had put on the garment, and was at the point of death.

This customs persists today in Spain and Italy, where people, of quality especially, take care, when they feel their death coming, of having themselves clothed in the garment of some religious order, such as those of Saint Dominic or Saint Francis, with which they are exposed in public or buried.
