= L'Angélus (band) =

American band

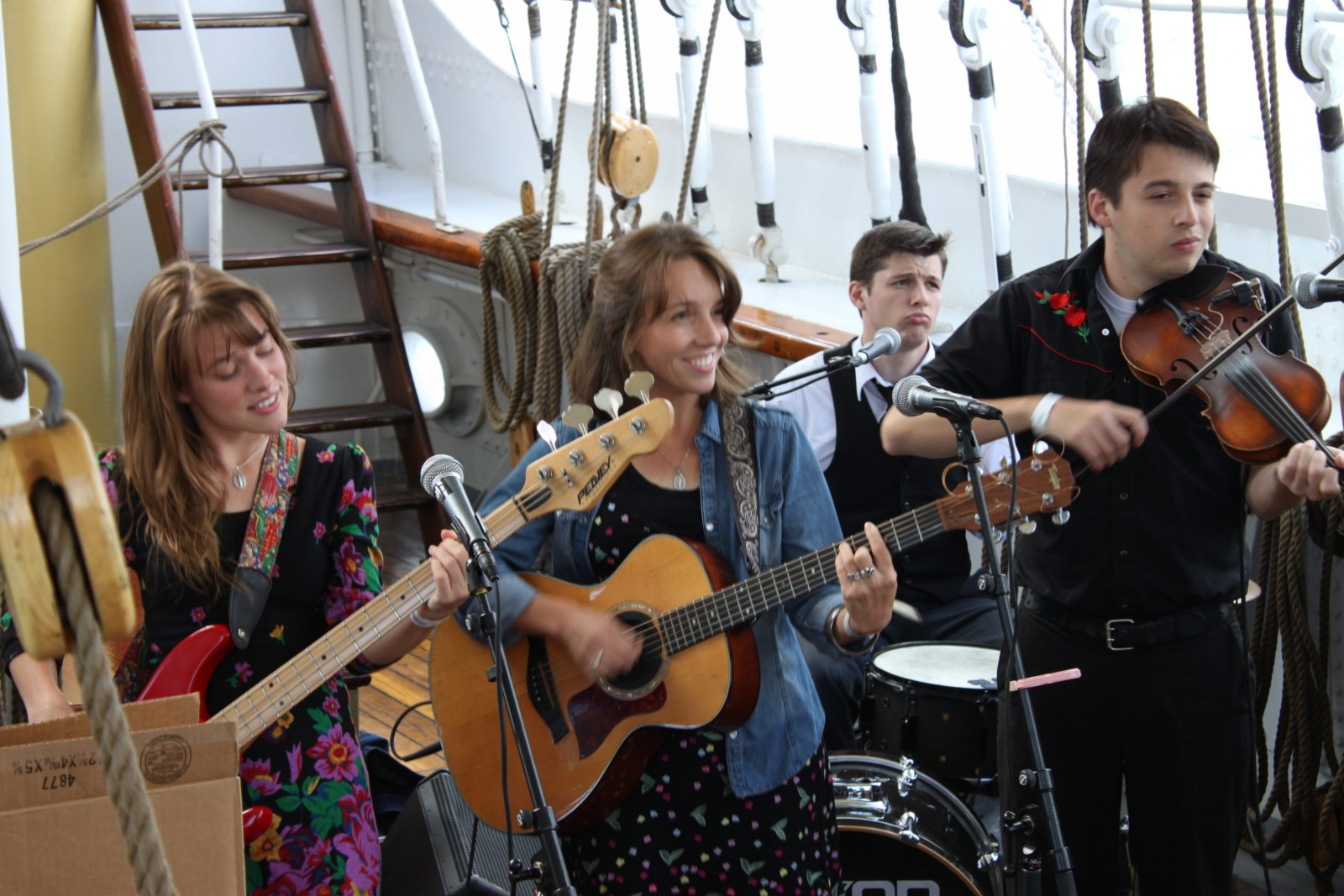

Background information
- Origin: Lafayette, LA
- Genres: Cajun, Western swing, Swamp pop, Zydeco, R&B, Rock & roll, Bluegrass
- Years active: 2005–present
- Members: Katie Rees, Paige Rees, Johnny Rees, Stephen Rees
- Website: langelus.com

L'Angélus is an American band composed of four siblings, Katie, Paige, Johnny, and Stephen Rees, who play in a variety of genres, but in recent years have emphasized their Louisiana roots, performing a mixture of cajun fiddle tunes, swing, saxophone driven swamp pop, and New Orleans-influenced R&B. Their music has received acclaim for its muscular energy, dynamic syncopated fiddle, and rich vocal harmonies. The band's members, now in their 20s, share the role of lead vocals. Katie, the oldest, plays guitar, Paige bass, Johnny drums, and Stephen, the youngest, plays fiddle, accordion, saxophone, and harmonica. As of 2016, the band was on indefinite hiatus.

== Beginnings ==
The origins of the band lay in the four's childhood. Katie, Paige, Johnny and Stephen are four of eight siblings whose parents, John and Linda Rees, lived in North Dakota where John was a flight instructor for the UND. Linda played guitar and sang in coffee shops when, one day, her oldest child, Katie, joined her. It's said that, when Katie received ice-cream as a reward, the others became interested. At Christmas, John, their father, gave each of them musical instruments, and they soon began playing together. In 2000, as "Linda Lou and the Lucky Four" they began to travel, playing classic pop, rock and roll and Americana, and receiving enthusiastic reviews across the Midwest and southeastern United States.

== Return to Cajun roots ==
Moving back to their father's place of origin in Louisiana, the band sought to re-connect with the Cajun and New Orleans Irish culture of their ancestors. Adopting the name L'Angélus, they put out their first CD, "Ca C'est Bon", in 2006. This was a mix of their own songs, in French and English, as well as well-known Cajun and Western swing tunes. The CD features eight original compositions as well as collaborations with Cajun legends D.L. Menard and Hadley Castille.

In 2006, the band was selected by Billboard Magazine from more than 1,400 artists as one of six finalists in the Independent Music World Series.

In 2008, the band released a Christmas CD "Oh Night Divine" which includes an original composition, "A Child is Born", a musical rendition of the G.K. Chesterton poem "The Nativity". In 2009, two of their original compositions were featured in the nationwide PBS documentary on Louisiana’s Wetlands, "Washing Away", narrated by Susan Sarandon. On May 28, 2009, the band was featured on the national EWTN TV show "Life on the Rock".

In 2009, L'Angelus released a third CD, "Sacred Hymns Collection", distributed by Ignatius Press. The band tours throughout the United States and Canada, and has also toured in Ireland, the United Kingdom and Norway.

== About the name L'Angélus ==
The band's name, L'Angélus, is derived from the French for the Angelus, a Catholic prayer to the Virgin Mary. Traditionally in Cajun and other Catholic cultures, worshipers paused three times daily to recite this prayer: at 6 a.m., noon, and 6 p.m. The band explains on its website, "Music in the Cajun culture has always been a unifying force - it brings families together on the front porch and at the parish dance. L’Angelus is the name of an ancient prayer that, like the music, signifies a coming together of a people. For centuries, Cajuns and their Acadian and French ancestors have bowed their heads to pray as a community whenever they hear the bells ring."
