= Angelique =

Angelique or Angélique may refer to:

- Angélique (given name), a French feminine name

== Arts and entertainment ==
=== Music ===
- Angélique (instrument), a string instrument of the lute family
- Angélique, a 1927 opera (farce) by Jacques Ibert
- "Angelique" (song), the Danish entry in the Eurovision Song Contest 1961, performed by Dario Campeotto
- "Angélique", a song by Theatre of Tragedy from the album Aégis
- "Angelique", a song by Badfinger from the album Magic Christian Music
- "Angelique", a song by Mike Oldfield from the album Light + Shade
- Angelique, the debut album by Yukie Nishimura

=== Other uses in arts and entertainment ===
- Angélique (novel series), by Anne Golon
  - Angélique, marquise des anges (1964) directed by Bernard Borderie
  - Merveilleuse Angélique (1965)
  - Angélique et le Roy (1966)
  - Indomptable Angélique (1967)
  - Angélique et le Sultan (1968)
  - Angélique (film), a 2013 film adaptation directed by Ariel Zeitoun
- Angélique (play), by Lorena Gale
- Angelique (video game series), a cross-media franchise including video games, manga, and anime
- Angelique, a doll from the Groovy Girls product line

== Other uses ==
- Angelique (grape), another name for the French wine grape Mondeuse noire
- Marie-Joseph Angélique, an executed French slave known as "Angélique"
- Angélique, an absinthe produced by the distillers of La Clandestine Absinthe

== See also ==
- Angelic (disambiguation)
- Angelica (disambiguation)
- Angelika (disambiguation)
