= Anjelika =

Anjelika may refer to:

- Anjelika Krylova, Russian figure skater
- Anjelika Akbar, music designer

== See also ==
- Anjelica (disambiguation)
- Angelika (disambiguation)
- Angelica (disambiguation)
