= Angelica (disambiguation) =

Angelica is a genus of herbs, especially the cultivated species Angelica archangelica

Angelica or Angélica may also refer to:

== Arts and media ==
=== Film and television ===
- Angelica (1939 film), a French-Italian film
- Angélica (1952 film), a Mexican film
- Angelica (2015 film), an American film
- Angelica (2016 film), a Puerto Rico film
- Angélica (TV series), a Mexican telenovela
- Angelica Pickles, in the Rugrats franchise

=== Literature ===
- Angelica (character), in Italian Renaissance literature
- Angelica, a 2003 novel by Sharon Shinn
- Angelica, a 2007 novel by Arthur Phillips

=== Music and dance ===
==== Songs and compositions ====
- L'Angelica (Porpora), 1720 serenata by Porpora
- L'Angelica (Carvalho), 1778 serenata by Carvalho
- Angelica (album), a 1988 album by Nels Cline
- "Angelica", recorded by Barry Mann, Gene Pitney, The Sandpipers, Scott Walker, and Oliver, original version of "La Musique"
- "Angelica", on the Anathema album Eternity
- "Angelica", on the Lamb album Between Darkness and Wonder
- "Angelica", on the Moi Dix Mois album Dixanadu
- "Angelica", on the Wet Leg album Wet Leg

==== Other uses in music and dance ====
- Angelica (dance), in ancient Greece
- Angelica (band), a punk rock band from Lancaster, England
- Angelica (singer) (born 1972), Latin pop singer active in the 1990s

== People ==
- Angelica (given name), a female given name derived from Latin angelicus meaning "angelic"
  - Angelica (singer) (born 1972), Latin pop singer active in the 1990s
  - Angélica (television host) (born 1973), Brazilian television host
- Angelica (surname), English surname with similar origin

== Places ==
- Angelica, New York, a town in Allegany County
  - Angelica (village), New York, within the above town
- Angelica, Wisconsin, a town in Shawano County
- Angelica (CDP), Wisconsin, in Shawano County
- Angelica Creek (Pennsylvania), a tributary of the Schuylkill River in Berks County, Pennsylvania
- Angélica, Mato Grosso do Sul, a municipality in Brazil

== Other uses ==
- Angelica wine, a historic sweet fortified wine
- Angelica vestis, garments
- Angelica (grape), grape cultivar

== See also ==
- Angelico (disambiguation)
- Angelika (disambiguation)
- Angelique (disambiguation)
