= Angélique (play) =

Canadian play by Lorena Gale

- Written by: Lorena Gale
- Characters: Marie-Josèphe Angélique; François Poulin de Franchville; Thérèse de Couagne; Claude Thibault; Ignace Gamelin; César; Manon
- Subject: Marie-Joseph Angelique
- Setting: Montreal, 1730s and present

Premiere
- Place: Alberta Theatre Projects, Calgary, Alberta

Angélique is a Canadian play by Lorena Gale inspired by the executed slave Marie-Joseph Angelique. It premiered in 1998 with Alberta Theatre Projects in Calgary, Alberta. Angélique's off-broadway premiere in 1999 garnered eight Audelco Award nominations.

== Development ==
A work-in-progress version of Angélique was presented on January 29, 1995 as a staged reading at Women in View Festival in Vancouver. It was directed by Brenda Leadlay and featured the playwright as Angélique. The 1995 text won the duMaurier National Playwriting Competition.

The play is a fictionalized accounted of Marie-Joseph Angélique, a slave who was executed in 1734 in Montreal, then part of New France, for arson.

== Plot summary ==
The play begins as a young female slave arrives in Montreal from Madiere, Portugal. She is purchased by François Poulin de Franchville for his wife, Thérèse de Couagne, who attests she does not want a slave. Thérèse and François name her Marie-Josèphe Angélique after their dead child. François forces Angélique to have sex with him. At the encouragement of Ignace, Angélique is paired with César, another slave, for breeding. She gives birth to several children, though it is unclear if they are César's or François'. Meanwhile, Angélique begins a romantic relationship with Claude, a white indentured servant.

François dies and Thérèse makes plans to sell Angèlique. Angélique, discovering she is about to be sold, plans to run away to America with Claude. While the two are leaving, a fire breaks out. It is never made clear who set it. On their journey to America, Claude abandons Angèlique, who is later apprehended on suspicion of starting the fire. She is tortured into confessing to starting the fire and is subsequently executed.

== Characters ==
- Marie-Josèphe Angélique
- François Poulin de Franchville, a wealthy iron works owner
- Thérèse de Couagne, wife to François
- Claude Thibault, an indentured servant
- Ignace Gamelin, business partner of François
- César, Ignace's slave
- Manon, an Aboriginal slave
- Reporter
- Margeurite
- Hypolite
- Marie Louise
- Marie Josephe
- Jean Josephe
- François de Beray

== Production history ==
Angélique premiered in 1998 at the playRites festival at Alberta Theatre Projects in Calgary.

In 1999, the play had its American premiere at the Detroit Repertory Theatre in Detroit, Michigan. That same year, it was produced in New York, off-Broadway at the Manhattan Class Company Theatre. In New York, it was nominated for eight Audelco Awards. This production was directed by Derek Anson Jones and starred Lisa Gay Hamilton, who understudied the role until Patrice Johnson, the show's original Angèlique, departed mere days before the show.

Angélique was first published in February 2000 by Playwrights Canada Press.

In 2017, Tableau D'Hôte Theatre and Black Theatre Workshop co-produced Angélique at The Studio at the Segal Centre for the Performing Arts in Montreal. The performance, the play's Quebec premiere, was staged to celebrate Montreal's 375th anniversary. Jenny Brizard played Angélique under the direction of Mike Payette. Two years later, this production toured Ontario including at Factory Theatre and the National Arts Centre.

== Awards and nominations ==
Year	Award	Category	Notes	Result	Ref.
1998	Betty Mitchell Awards	Outstanding New Play		Nominated	
1999	Audelco Awards	Production of the year		Nominated	
1999	Audelco Awards	Lead actress	for Patrice Johnson	Nominated	
1999	Audelco Awards	Supporting Actress	for Patricia Nyberg	Nominated	
1999	Audelco Awards	Director/Dramatic Production	for Derek Anson Jones	Nominated	
1999	Audelco Awards	Sound Design	for Robert Murphy	Nominated	
1999	Audelco Awards	Costume Design	for Marion Williams	Nominated	
1999	Audelco Awards	Set Design	for Myung Hee Cho	Nominated	
1999	Audelco Awards	Lighting Design	for Michael Chybowski	Nominated	
2017	Montreal English Theatre Awards	Outstanding Professional (PACT) Theatre Production		Won	
2017	Montreal English Theatre Awards	Outstanding Contribution to the Theatre	for the SIXTRUM Percussion Ensemble	Won	
2017	Montreal English Theatre Awards	Outstanding Lead Actress	for Jenny Brizard	Nominated	
2017	Montreal English Theatre Awards	Outstanding Supporting Actor	for Tristan D. Lalla, Olivier Lamarche, Karl Graboshas	Nominated	
2017	Montreal English Theatre Awards	Outstanding Direction	for Mike Payette	Nominated	
2017	Montreal English Theatre Awards	Outstanding Sound Design	for SIXTRUM Percussion Ensemble	Nominated	
2017	Montreal English Theatre Awards	Outstanding Set Design	for Eo Sharp	Nominated	

== Analysis ==
In contrast to Lorris Elliott's and Paul Fehmiu Brown's fictionalizations of Marie-Josèphe Angélique, Gale avoids presenting her as a martyr and presents her, instead, as a seditious rebel.

Angélique blurs the line between history and the present through its use of both modern dress and period clothing as well as through lines that would be anachronistic to the original setting.
