= Lieke =

Dutch feminine given name

- Pronunciation: [ˈlikə]
- Gender: Feminine
- Language: Dutch

Origin
- Language: Dutch
- Derivation: Lie + ke
- Meaning: Little Lie

Other names
- Variant form: Like
- Derived: Angelie, Angelika, Elisabeth, Lia, Nicolaas

Lieke (Dutch pronunciation: [ˈlikə]) is a Dutch feminine given name. It is a diminutive of a short form of the name Angelie, Angelika, Elisabeth, Lia, or Nicolaas. The name was introduced in the 1940s, with popularity peaks in 1991 and 2008. It is the name of over 16,000 women in the Netherlands and Belgium, and can also be found in northern Germany.

== Etymology ==
Lieke means 'little Lie', where the suffix -ke indicates it is a diminutive and Lie is a shortened form of the feminine names Angelie, Angelika, or Lia. As a spelling variation of the name Like, Lie can also be a diminutive short form of the feminine name Elisabeth or the masculine name Nicolaas.

== Popularity ==
In the Netherlands, Lieke was first registered as a given name in the 1940s with a total of 0–3 newborns per year until the late 1960s, when the name gradually started to gain popularity with a smaller peak of 277 newborns in 1991 and a larger peak of 719 newborns in 2008. As of 2017, there were 14,239 women (0.1908%) with Lieke as first name and 1,200 women (0.0162%) with Lieke as middle name in the Netherlands; the municipality of Veghel had the highest percentage (0.6846%) of women named Lieke, followed by the municipality of Veldhoven (0.6726%), both in the southern province of North Brabant.

In Belgium, the popularity of Lieke peaked with 67 newborns in 2008. As of 2023, there were 583 women with Lieke as first name in Belgium.

In Germany, the name is most popular in the northern states, particularly in the state of Schleswig-Holstein.

== People named Lieke ==
People with the first name Lieke include: (Note: Only people with English Wikipedia articles are included in this list.)

- Lieke Klaus (born 1989), Dutch BMX racer
- Lieke Klaver (born 1998), Dutch track and field athlete
- Lieke van Lexmond (born 1982), Dutch actress, model, presenter and singer
- Lieke Marsman (1990–2026), Dutch poet
- Lieke Martens (born 1992), Dutch football player
- Lieke Nooijen (born 2001), Dutch cyclist
- Lieke Rogge (born 2000), Dutch waterpolo player
- Lieke Wevers (born 1991), Dutch gymnast
- Lieke van Wijk (born 1993), Dutch field hockey player
