= Angelica (given name) =

Anjelica
- Pronunciation: /ænˈdʒɛlɪkə/ an-JEL-ik-ə
- Gender: Female
- Language: Any Indo-European language
- Name day: Any

Origin
- Meaning: Angelic

Other names
- Related names: Angellica, Angelika, Angellika, Angelique, Anjelica Angelikca

Angelica is an English language surname and female given name and a variant of Angelika or vice versa.

== Meaning ==
Angelica comes from the Latin angelicus ("angelic"), which in turn is descended from the Greek άγγελος (ángelos) meaning "angel". Its male counterpart is Angelico.

== As a surname ==
Angelica is also a surname with similar meaning and was historically found mostly in the UK, US, and Canada. It was reported that they had a relatively low life expectancy of under 50 years.

== Variations ==
Angélica (Portuguese), Angelika (German, Polish), Angelika (Indonesian), Angyalka, Angyal (Hungarian), Angélique (French), Anjelica, Angelica (Italian, Indonesian, Spanish, English), Anxélica (Galician), Angeliki or Aggeliki (Αγγελική, Greek), Anxhelika (Albanian), Anzhelika (Russian).

== Notable Angelicas ==
=== Historical ===
- Angelica Agurbash (born 1970), Belarusian singer and former model
- Angélica de Almeida (born 1965), Brazilian long-distance runner
- Angélica Aragón (born 1953), Mexican film and telenovela actress
- Angelica Balabanoff (1878–1965), Ukrainian Jewish-Italian socialist
- Angellica Bell (born 1976), British television and radio presenter
- Angelica Bella (active on 1990s), Hungarian pornographic actress
- Angelica Bengtsson (born 1993), Swedish pole vaulter
- Angelica Bridges (born 1970), American actress
- Angelica Bove (born 2003), Italian singer-songwriter
- Angelica Burevik (born 1958), Swedish association footballer
- Angelica Cristina Gori (born 2001), know professionally as Chiamamifaro, Italian singer-songwriter
- Aggeliki Daliani (born 1979), Greek actress
- Angelica Garcia (born 1972), American Latin pop star from the 1990s
- Angelica Garnett (1918–2012), British writer, painter and artist
- Angelica Generosa, American ballet dancer
- Angélica Gorodischer (1928–2022), Argentine writer
- Angelica Guerrero-Cuellar, American politician
- Angelica Hale (born 2007), American singer
- Angelica Hamilton (1784–1857), the second child and the first daughter of Elizabeth Schuyler Hamilton and Alexander Hamilton
- Angelica Hicks (born 1992), British artist
- Angelica Lindén Hirschberg, Swedish obstetrician and gynecologist
- Anjelica Huston (born 1951), American actress
- Angeliki Karapataki (born 1975), Greek water polo player
- Angelica Kauffman (1741–1807), Swiss painter
- Angélica Ksyvickis (born 1973), Brazilian TV personality.
- Angélica Kvieczynski (born 1991), Brazilian rhythmic gymnast
- Angélica Larrea (born 1944), Afro-Bolivian ceremonial queen
- Angelica Lopez (born 2000), Filipina model and beauty pageant titleholder
- Angelica Mandy, English actress
- Angélica María (born 1944), Mexican actress and singer
- Angelica Martinelli (fl. 1578), Italian actress
- Angelica Paola Ibba (born 2001), know professionally as Angie, Italian singer
- Angelica Panganiban (born 1986), Filipina actress and model
- Angelica Ronald, British psychologist
- Angelica Salas, American immigration activist
- Angelica Schuyler Church (1756–1814), member of American Schuyler family
- Aggeliki Tsiolakoudi (born 1976), Greek javelin thrower
- Angélica Vale (born 1975), Mexican-American actress
- Angelica Van Buren (1818–1877), daughter-in-law of the 8th United States President
- Mother Angelica (Rita Antoinette Rizzo, 1923–2016), American Roman Catholic nun and founder of the Eternal Word Television Network
- American wrestler Lita, whose ring name once was Angelica

=== Fictional ===
- Angelica (character), a princess of Cathay in Orlando innamorato (1483–1495) and Orlando Furioso (1516–1532)
- Angelica, a character from Library of Ruina
- Sister Angelica, central character in Suor Angelica, a one-act opera by Giacomo Puccini
- Angelica Button, a child character in a work of fiction in The Simpsons
- Angelica Jones, alter ego of the Marvel superhero Firestar
- Angelica Pickles (active since 1991), a cartoon character from the American animated series Rugrats and its spin-offs

== See also ==
- Angelica (disambiguation)
