= Anjelica =

Anjelica may refer to:

- Anjelica Huston, an American actress
- Anjelica Selden, African-American athlete
- Anjelica Sanchez, Miss Continental Plus 2004

== See also ==
- Anjelika (disambiguation)
- Angelica
- Angelika (disambiguation)
