= Moïsette Olier =

Canadian writer

- Born: Corinne P. Beauchemin; September 30, 1885; Forges du Saint-Maurice, Trois-Rivières, Quebec
- Died: June 17, 1972 (aged 86)
- Occupation: Writer
- Spouse: Joseph Garceau (m. 1929)

Corinne P. Beauchemin (September 30, 1885 – June 17, 1972), known better by her pen name, Moïsette Olier was a Canadian writer from Quebec.

== Biography ==
Corinne P. Beauchemin was born in Forges du Saint-Maurice, September 30, 1885.

Olier was a contributor to various newspapers including, Le Bien public, Le Nouvelliste, and Le Mauricien. Her work contributed to the regionalist literary stream, favored in particular by the tricentennial of the founding of Trois-Rivières. In 1934, the Trois-Rivières region went through a period of "literary renaissance".

Olier lived in Shawinigan. In 1929, she married Joseph Garceau, who was the first doctor in that city. In 1944, she moved to Montreal.

She chose the pseudonym, "Moïsette Olier", in reference to the name of her great-grandfather, Moses Olier. She died on June 17, 1972.

== Honors ==
- Moïsette-Olier Street, Shawinigan, named in 1976.
- Moïsette-Olier Bay, a bay of Saint-Maurice, named in 1982.

== Selected works ==
- L'Homme à la Physionomie macabre, Éditions Édouard Garand, 1927
- "Le St-Maurice", in Au pays de l’énergie, 1932
- Cha8inigane, 1934
- Mademoiselle Sérénité, 1936
- Cendres,
- Étincelles, 1936
