= Angelic =

Angelic may refer to:

- Angel, a supernatural being
- Angelic (band), a British trance band
- Angelic acid, an organic compound
- Angelic de Grimoard, brother of Pope Urban V
- Angelic Encounters, an album by the Dutch band Thanatos
- Angelic language (disambiguation)
- Angelic Layer, a 1999 Japanese comics
- Angelic Organics, a community-supported agriculture farm in Caledonia, Illinois, US
- Angelic Pretty, a Japanese fashion company
- Angelic tongues, a term related to a Jewish theme
- Angelic Upstarts, an English musical band
- The Angelic Conversation (disambiguation)

== See also ==
- Angelique (disambiguation)
