= Angélique (given name) =

Angelique or Angélique is a feminine French given name. Notable people with the name include:

- Angélique Arnaud (1799–1884), French writer
- Angélique de Saint-Jean Arnauld d'Andilly (1624–1684), French Jansenist nun and writer
- Angelique Bates, (born 1979), American actress
- Angelique Boyer (born 1988), French-born Mexican actress, model, and singer
- Angélique Brûlon (1772–1859), French soldier
- Angélique Bullion (17th century), French benefactress
- Angelique Burgos (born 1978), Puerto Rican television host and actress
- Angélique du Coudray (1715–1794), French midwife
- Angélique de Froissy (1702–1785), French noblewoman
- Angelique Gerber (born 1983), South African actress
- Angélique D'Hannetaire (1749–1822), French actress
- Angelique Hoorn (born 1975), Dutch show jumper
- Angelique Kerber (born 1988), German tennis player
- Angélique Kidjo (born 1960), Beninese musician
- Angelique Magito (1809–1895), Swedish singer and actress
- Angelique Morgan (born 1975), French adult film actress and reality television participant
- Angelique Pettyjohn (1943–1992), American actress
- Angélique de Rouillé (1756–1840), Belgian writer
- Angelique Seriese (born 1968), Dutch judoka
- Angélique Spincer (born 1984), French team handball player
- Angelique Taai (born 1987), South African cricketer
- Angélique Victoire, Comtesse de Chastellux (1752–1816), French noblewoman
- Angelique Walker-Smith (born 1958), African-American Baptist minister
- Angelique Widjaja (born 1984), Indonesian tennis player

In fiction

- Angelique Bouchard Collins, a character from the television series Dark Shadows
- Angélique de Sancé de Monteloup, fictional heroine of Angelique (French series)
- Angelique Limoges, protagonist of Angelique (Japanese series)

== See also ==
- Angelica (disambiguation)
- Angelique (disambiguation)
- Angela (disambiguation)
- Angie (given name)
