= Angelico =

Angelico or Angélico may refer to:

== People ==
- Fra Angelico (1395–1455), early Italian renaissance painter
- Angelico Carta (1886–?), Italian military officer
- Angelico Chavez (1910–1996), American Franciscan priest, historian, author, poet, and painter
- Angélico Vieira (1982–2011), Portuguese actor and singer
- Angélico (born 1987), South African professional wrestler
- Maria Angelico (fl. 2001–2018), Australian actor, writer and producer

== Other uses ==
- Muscadelle, a French wine grape alternatively called angelico)
- Pallacanestro Biella, an Italian professional basketball club known as Angelico Biella in domestic competition

== See also ==
- Angelica (disambiguation)
