= L'Angelica (Carvalho) =

Serenata by João de Sousa Carvalho

L'Angelica is a serenata by João de Sousa Carvalho to a libretto by Metastasio previously set by other composers. The plot concerns how Angelica thwarts the noble Orlando and elopes with Medoro. The 1720 serenata Angelica e Medoro by Nicola Porpora is a setting of the same libretto.

== Recording ==
- L'Angelica, Joana Seara (soprano), Lidia Vinyes Curtis (mezzo), Fernando Guimarães (tenor), Tavares, Medeiros, Concerto Campestre, Pedro Castro. 2 CDs Naxos
