= François-Étienne Cugnet =

François-Étienne Cugnet (1688 – August 19, 1751) was a lawyer and merchant in New France. He was director of the Domaine d'Occident in New France.

He was the son of Jean-Baptiste Cugnet, dean of the faculty of law of the Université de Paris, and Madeleine Baudin. Around 1717, he married Louise-Madeleine Dusautoy. In 1719, he went to New France. Cugnet was administrator for the Domaine du Roi or King's Posts, a large territory on the north shore of the Saint Lawrence. In 1730, he was named to the Conseil Supérieur. Cugnet was a partner in the Saint-Maurice ironworks. When the ironworks failed, he was pursued by the company's creditors and was forced to declare personal bankruptcy in 1741.

Cugnet became owner of the seigneury of Saint-Étienne in 1737. From that year until 1749, he held the lease on the Tadoussac trading post.

He died at Quebec City in 1751.

His oldest son François-Joseph wrote several books on New France's legal system and also was official translator during the time of Governor Guy Carleton. His son Thomas-Marie also served on the Conseil Supérieur and was an agent for the Compagnie des Indes.
