= Marie-Joseph Angélique =

18th-century slave in French North America; executed for arson

Marie-Josèphe dite Angélique (ca. 1705-June 21, 1734) was a Madeira-born black slave, who lived in New France in the early 1700s and was executed for an act of arson in Montreal in 1734. Her original name is unknown - Marie-Josèphe dite Angélique was the name given her by her last enslavers. She was tried and convicted of setting fire to her enslaver's home, burning much of what is now referred to as Old Montreal. For long, it was generally accepted that Angélique was guilty of the act of arson, but recently historians argued that she was innocent of the crime and was convicted more on the basis of her reputation as a rebellious slave prone to running away than on the basis of factual evidence. A competing theory is that she was guilty of the crime but was acting in rebellion against enslavement. Historians have not reached a consensus regarding Angélique's guilt or innocence.

Procès contre (lawsuit against) Marie-Josèphe-Angélique, Montréal, 1734

== Early life ==
Angélique was born around 1705 in Madeira, a possession of Portugal in the Atlantic west of Morocco.

At some point, she was enslaved by a Flemish man named Nichus Block or Nicolas Bleeker and brought to the New World. She worked as slave in New England then was sold in 1725 to François Poulin de Francheville, an important French businessman from Montreal. After his death in 1733, Angelique belonged to his widow, Thérèse de Couagne (AKA Mme. de Francheville). Slaves in New England and New France primarily performed domestic service, since the economy was not based on large-scale plantations, unlike the southern part of what would become the United States. Angélique therefore was forced to work in the Francheville home in Montreal and occasionally performed forced labour on the family's small farm on the island of Montreal, which was primarily produced supplies for Francheville's trading expeditions.

Angélique had three children while in Montréal: a boy born in 1731 who lived only one month and twins in 1732, who both died within five months. The father listed in the baptismal records was Jacques César, a black enslaved man from Madagascar who was enslaved by Ignace Gamelin, a friend of Francheville. It is not known whether Angélique and César were lovers by choice or whether their enslavers forced them to have children (the children of enslaved people became themselves enslaved and the property of the mother's enslavers).

In 1733, the year preceding the fire and her trial, Angélique was involved in a relationship with a white indentured servant, Claude Thibault, who was employed by the Franchevilles. Following the death of Francheville in November 1733, Mme Francheville was occupied with many transactions while operating her late husband's businesses and settling his estate. Early in 1734, being occupied with estate affairs in Trois-Rivières, Mme Francheville asked her brother-in-law Alexis Monière to keep both her slave and her indentured servant Claude Thibault for her until her return.

On February 22, while Mme. Francheville was away, Angélique and Thibault attempted to escape to New England, fleeing across the frozen St. Lawrence river and stopping to retrieve bread that Thibault had hidden in a barn in Longueuil in preparation for their flight. However, the difficulty of winter travel forced them to take refuge in Châteauguay, near the Chambly road, until the weather improved. They were captured a couple of weeks later and returned to Montreal by militia captains, acting in their capacity as local police. Thibault was in prison from March 5 until his release on April 8, the day before the fire. Angélique visited him several times while he was in jail and brought him food.

Upon her arrest, Angélique was returned to Madame de Francheville, who did not have her disciplined in any way for her attempted flight, possibly because she was already planning to sell her. As mentioned during the trial, Mme. de Francheville found herself unable to control Angélique and intended to accept an offer by one of her deceased husband's business associates, François-Étienne Cugnet, to purchase her for 600 pounds of gunpowder. The offer was conditional on Mme. de Francheville covering expenses for sending Angélique to Quebec City, where Cugnet lived. Fear of being sold and possibly ending up in the West Indies may have been a factor in Angelique's earlier attempt to run away.

Tension was high between the slave and her mistress. Mme. Francheville dismissed a free servant, Louise Poirier, because of squabbling and disagreements with Angelique. Angélique promised Mme. Francheville that she could do all the work better than Poirier, possibly hoping that a good performance on her part would make her mistress keep her. Due to this promise, Mme. de Francheville sent Poirier away, but promised her that she would contact her after Angélique was shipped to Quebec City.

After Thibault's release, he visited Mme. de Francheville to demand his outstanding wages. She paid them but warned Thibault never to set foot in her house again. Angry, she also confirmed to him that Angélique had in fact been sold and would be shipped to Quebec City as soon as the ice cleared and the St. Lawrence River was passable to ships. Thibault ignored the order to stay away and visited Angélique several times while Mme. de Francheville was not at home. As this was early April, they likely knew that the ice soon clear and that Angélique would not be in Montreal much longer. Angélique told a servant that she intended to run away again, and it is possible that she and Thibault discussed escaping together and setting a fire to cover their escape.

== Fire of April 10, 1734 ==
At seven o'clock in the evening on Saturday, April 10, 1734, a fire started on the south side of rue Saint-Paul and spread east of rue Saint-Joseph (rue Saint-Sulpice). The fire was so intense that law enforcement officers could not get close to it. Many people initially sheltered in the Hôtel-Dieu, but due to a strong wind blowing from the west, the fire spread and destroyed the hospital in less than three hours. Forty-five houses were also destroyed, and due to people taking advantage of the general panic, to steal many items from houses and from the convent.

The following journal entry of Sister Véronique Cuillerier illustrates the suddenness of the fire, and the difficulty of trying to control it:

The April 10 [1734] while all was most quiet and our thoughts were far from some fatal mishap, at 7 in the evening during our time of leisure, we heard a cry of fire. In the moment, we all rose to catch sight of its whereabouts. It was sighted at a neighbouring house. We rushed to contain the fire, but the Lord did not allow us to succeed. All took refuge in our church, thinking that we would be spared, but the flames rose so ardently towards the church, which was just across the street from the burning houses, that we soon found ourselves engulfed.

Rumours began to circulate accusing Angélique of having set the fire; later in the evening, the convent's gardener, Louis Bellefeuille dit LaRuine, even told her face-to-face about these rumours, although she denied them. The origin of the rumours seems to have been comments made by Marie-Manon, the young panis slave owned by De Couagne's neighbours, the Bérey des Essars, who claimed she had heard Angélique saying that her mistress would not sleep in her house that night. By the time the fire had gone out, popular opinion held that Angélique had set the fire. She was found in the garden of the paupers of the Hôtel-Dieu and taken to the king's gaols to wait for a formal charge to be filed against her. A warrant was also issued later for Thibault, but although he was seen again on the Tuesday morning following the fire (two days later), by the time the bailiffs set out to arrest him he had disappeared and was never seen again in New France.

== Trial and execution ==
Angélique was charged and tried for starting the blaze. French law at the time allowed a suspect to be arrested based on "public knowledge", when the community agreed that a suspect was guilty. Over the next six weeks, the prosecution called a large number of witnesses, none of whom testified to have seen Angélique set the fire, but all of whom claimed they were certain that she had done it. They testified at length as to Angélique's character as a badly behaved slave who often spoke back to her owners, but no solid evidence was presented as to her culpability for the fire.

Frustrated by the lack of sufficient evidence to condemn Angélique, the prosecution contemplated asking for permission to apply torture prior to a definitive judgment, a highly unusual procedure which was rarely allowed in New France. However, an eyewitness suddenly appeared: the five-year-old daughter of Alexis Monière, Amable, testified that she had seen Angélique carrying a shovelful of coals up to the attic of the house on the afternoon the fire started. This evidence finally allowed the prosecutor to close his case and the judge and the four commissioners he summoned to participate in the sentence all concurred that Angélique was guilty. Beaugrand-Champagne points out that no one questioned why it took so long for Amable to come forward in a city where the fire and the trial was likely to have been widely discussed; she attributes this willingness to credit the little girl's testimony to the fact that too many people had lost too much and a scapegoat was necessary.

The sentence included the following instructions:

And everything Considered, We have Declared the Said accused, Marie Joseph Angelique Sufficiently guilty And Convicted of Having set fire to the house of dame francheville Causing the Burning of a portion of the city. In Reparation for which we have Condemned her to make honourable amends Disrobed, a Noose around her Neck, and carrying In her hands a flaming torch weighing two pounds before the main door and Entrance of the parish Church of This city where She will be taken And Led, by the executioner of the high Court, in a Tumbrel used for garbage, with an Inscription Front And Back, with the word, Incendiary, And there, bare-headed, And On her Knees, will declare that She maliciously set the fire And Caused the Said Burning, for which She repents And Asks Forgiveness from the Crown And Court, and this done, will have her fist Severed On a stake Erected in front of the Said Church. Following which, she will be led by the said Executioner in the same tumbrel to the Public Place to there Be bound to the Stake with iron shackles And Burned alive, her Body then Reduced To Ashes And Cast to the Wind, her Belongings taken And Remanded to the King, the said accused having previously been subjected to torture in the ordinary And Extraordinary ways in order to have her Reveal her Accomplices

The sentence was automatically appealed to the Superior Council by the prosecutor, as was required by the Ordinance on criminal procedure of 1670. Angélique was thus sent off to Quebec City where, a week later, the appeals court confirmed their belief in Angélique's guilt while reducing somewhat the savagery of the trial court's sentence, so that Angélique was no longer to have her hand cut off or be burnt alive, but rather to be hanged and once dead, her body burned and the ashes scattered. The council also dispensed with the requirement to have her carried through the town on a rubbish cart wearing a sign declaring her an arsonist. However, the sentence still required her to be tortured to identify her accomplices, the Councillors apparently believing, as did the Montreal court, that Angélique had not acted alone, especially as Thibault had disappeared a couple of days after the fire and never been found. This type of torture was called the question préalable (torture prior to execution) and aimed at making the convicted criminal confess or denounce any possible accomplices or both.

A few days later, the prisoner was back in Montréal, and on June 21, the court proceeded to read the revised sentence to her and prepare her for the question. Angélique steadfastly refused to confess or name any accomplices, even faced with the boot, an instrument of torture consisting of an assemblage of wooden planks bound to the prisoner's legs. The judge then instructed the Colony's executioner and "master of torture", a black slave named Mathieu Leveillé, to apply the question ordinaire (four strokes of a hammer driving a wedge between the planks, thus applying increasing pressure which gradually crushes the prisoner's legs). Angélique broke almost immediately and confessed her guilt but still maintained that she had acted alone. The judge ordered the question extraordinaire (four strokes on an additional wedge, inserted at the ankles) and Angélique, while repeating that she and she alone had set the fire, begged the court to end her misery and hang her.

On the afternoon of the same day, Angélique was taken one last time through the streets of Montreal and, after the stop at the church for her amende honorable mounted a scaffold facing the ruins of the buildings destroyed by the fire and there was hanged, then strangled until dead, her body flung into a fire and the ashes scattered in the wind.

== Conflicting interpretations ==
The historiography of Angélique's story is not extensive, as only a few professional historians have looked at her case until quite recently, and most of the older work dealt with her superficially and rapidly, in a paragraph or page or two, as part of larger works on slavery or crime in New France. The older works all agreed with the opinion of the judges—Angélique set the fire to revenge herself on her owner. However, the first full-length non-fictional account of her trial, written by Denyse Beaugrand-Champagne and published in Quebec in French in 2004, was also the first serious study to use all the trial records. The author sets out to present the documents in detail, to question the court proceedings and to present all the possible culprits. She concludes that the fire was most likely accidental, the result of poorly cleaned chimneys and a cook fire in the neighbouring house—a cook fire manned by Marie-Manon, the young panis slave who started the rumours about Angélique, having said that her owner would not sleep in her bed. In this interpretation, Marie-Manon, who could have been severely punished by her owners had she been implicated in accidentally causing the fire, had plenty of motivation for diverting suspicion elsewhere. Beaugrand-Champagne believes that the authorities, under pressure by an enraged population looking for a scapegoat for their troubles, took the easy way out and condemned Angélique more on the basis of her independent and outspoken character than on any genuine evidence.

Two years later, Afua Cooper published a book on Angélique in English, which champions the thesis that Angélique did start the 1734 fire, as a justified rebellion against her owner and as a cover for an escape attempt. Cooper's book criticizes white Canadians for what she sees as trying to downplay or deny the reality of slavery in Canada's past. She claims that the transcript of Angélique's trial can be seen as the first slave narrative in the New World.

A comparative critical review by Evelyn Kolish finds Beaugrand-Champagne's work to be more trustworthy, while pointing out some serious flaws in Cooper's methodology. Kolish characterizes Cooper's book as "un texte qui se situe à mi-chemin entre le roman historique et l'essai journalistique anti-esclavagiste" (English: "a text that is situated halfway between an historical novel and an anti-slavery journalistic essay"). No consensus has been reached by the modern historical community on Angélique's guilt or innocence.

Since the prosecution at her trial did not meet their burden of proof, by today's standards, it is impossible to know for sure whether she was guilty. Fortunately, the exceptional wealth of detail afforded by the trial transcripts, and a great deal of important contextual documentation, including both secondary and primary sources, is now readily available to everyone in English translation, on the pedagogical site. The original French manuscripts are available on the website of Bibliothèque et Archives nationales du Québec. Regardless of whether Angélique was innocent or guilty, her story provided more insight on the conditions of slavery in Canada. Allan Greer used the records of her trial to gain a fuller sense of the life of a slave in eighteenth-century Montreal. Placing that experience in context, he notes that "there were degrees and varieties of unfreedom" in this society that affected servants, engagés, apprentices and soldiers; of course, slavery was uniquely horrible in the way it denied the humanity of the enslaved. "Complex and even intimate, the relationships of early Canadian slavery were nevertheless founded upon an underlying brutality that comes to the surface in the story of Angélique."

== Legacy ==
Angélique's dramatic story has inspired several novels, plays and poems or songs about her. One, the play Angélique by Lorena Gale, loosely based on an unpublished translation of the trial transcripts by Denyse Beaugrand-Champagne, won the 1995 du Maurier National Playwriting Competition in Canada. Angélique appears almost as a legendary figure, and parts of her story have taken on a life of their own in countries such as Haiti, where, irrespective of documentary evidence, the tale that she was burnt alive with her hand cut off is still told, as if the original sentence had not been reduced. Cooper's book rallies the opinions of other contemporary black authors, such as the poet George Elliott Clarke, who wrote her preface. Such authors see her as an "immortal avatar of liberation" and prefer to see her as an active rebel rather than a victim of a miscarriage of justice. Others, like Beaugrand-Champagne, find her just as inspiring as an exceptional, outspoken, independent-minded woman, who fought for her freedom and her life with courage and wit, against formidable odds, and in spite of a society that expected submission from women, especially if they were also black and slaves.

In 2012, a public square in Montreal, facing City Hall, was named Place Marie-Josèphe-Angélique.

In 2016, a short film entitled C’est Moi by Howard J Davis, explored the history of Angélique set against the sesquicentennial anniversary of Montreal.

== See also ==
- Black Canadians
- History of Quebec
