= Lorena Gale =

Canadian actress, playwright and theatre director

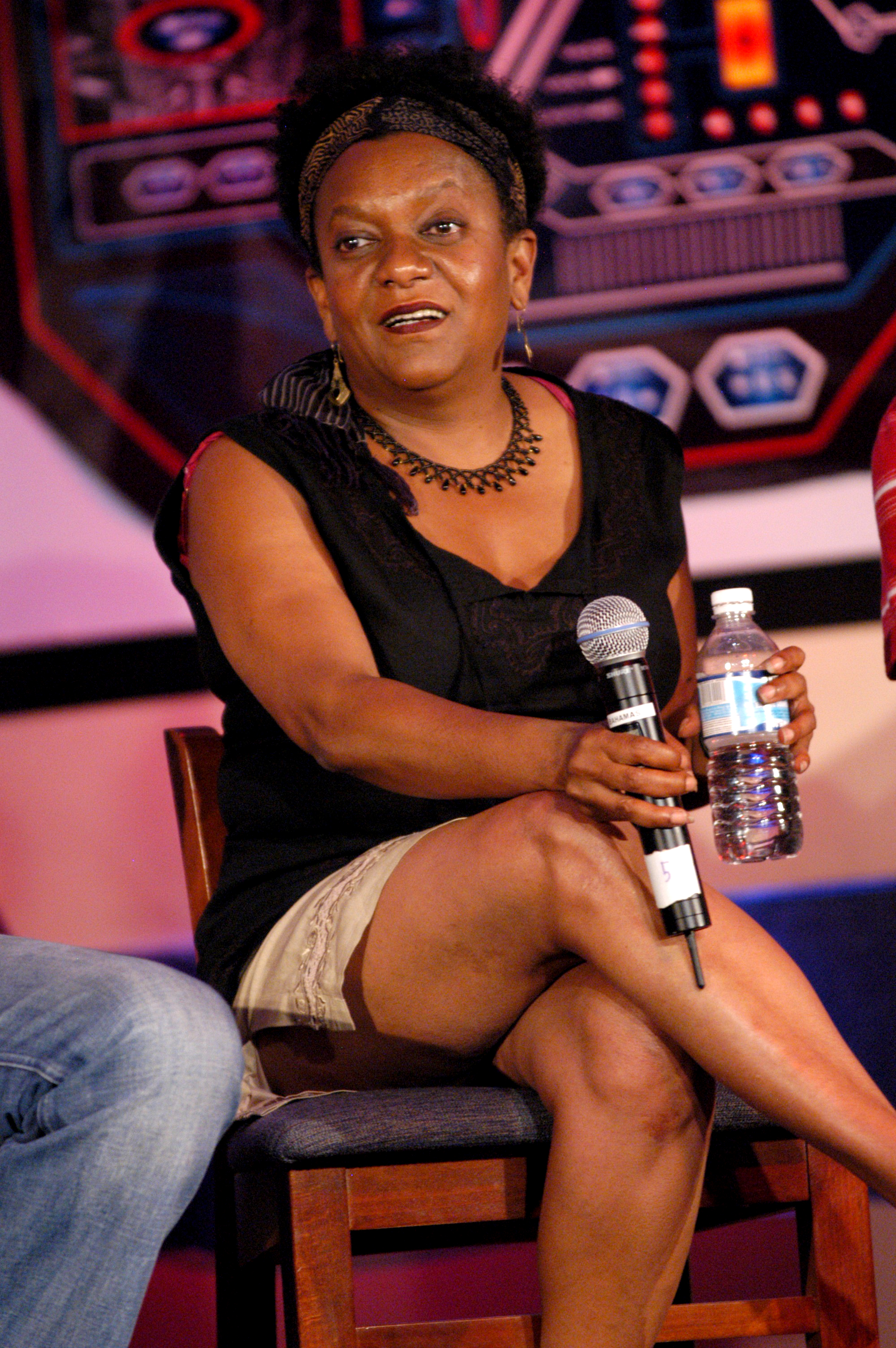
- Gale at Gatecon, July 30, 2005
- Born: May 9, 1958; Montreal, Quebec, Canada
- Died: June 21, 2009 (aged 51); Vancouver, British Columbia, Canada
- Other names: Lorena Gayle; Lorineda Gayle
- Occupations: Actress, playwright, theatre director
- Years active: 1981–2009
- Spouse: John Cooper (m. 1988)

Lorena Gale (May 9, 1958 – June 21, 2009) was a Canadian actress, playwright and theatre director. She was active onstage and in films and television since the 1980s. She also authored two award-winning plays, Angélique and Je me souviens.

== Life and career ==
Gale was born in Montreal, Quebec to an African-Caribbean family. She studied at Concordia University and the National Theatre School and completed a Master of Arts in Liberal Studies from Simon Fraser University in Vancouver in 2005.

Her performances on stage for Lorraine Hansberry's Raisin in the Sun and Joseph A. Walker's River Niger won her the Montreal Gazette Theatre Critics Award for Outstanding Performance in 1981.

In 1985, she became the artistic director of Montréal's Black Theatre Workshop. She then studied playwriting at the Playwrights' Workshop Montréal.

After moving to Vancouver in 1988, Lorena won a 1991 Jessie Richardson Award for best supporting actress as Normal Jean in The Colored Museum (1990) .

Her play, Angélique, the story of executed slave Marie-Joseph Angelique, was the winner of the 1995 duMaurier National Playwriting Competition in Canada. Her writing explores the nature of being black and mixed-race and belonging in Canada. In 2000, she produced her stage play Je me souviens, a monologue about her experiences growing up in Montreal, at the Firehall Arts Centre in Vancouver, BC. The play was published by Talonbooks in 2001.

She appeared in such films as The Hotel New Hampshire, Another Cinderella Story, Ernest Goes to School, Fantastic Four, Traitor, The Chronicles of Riddick, The Mermaid Chair, and The Exorcism of Emily Rose. She has guest starred on television programs such as The X-Files, Stargate SG-1, Smallville and Kingdom Hospital. Until August 2005, she starred as Priestess Elosha on the Sci-Fi Channel television program Battlestar Galactica.

Gale also lent her voice to several animated works such as RoboCop: Alpha Commando, The Bitsy Bears, Camp Candy, The Adventures of Corduroy and Hurricanes.

Gale's final film role was as a librarian in Scooby-Doo! The Mystery Begins, which was dedicated to her.

== Death ==
Gale died on June 21, 2009, at age 51, following a period of being ill with throat cancer.

== Filmography ==
| Year | Title | Role | Notes |
|---|---|---|---|
| 1982 | Visiting Hours | Nurse 1 | |
| 1984 | The Hotel New Hampshire | Dark Inge | |
| 1987 | Wild Thing | Scooter | |
| 1989 | Cousins | Cosmetic Demonstrator | |
| 1989 | The Fly II | Woman | |
| 1992 | Farther West | | |
| 1994 | Ernest Goes to School | History Teacher | |
| 1996 | Maternal Instincts | Anita | |
| 1997 | Indefensible: The Truth About Edward Brannigan | Cheryl Drew | TV movie |
| 1998 | American Dragons | Captain Talman | |
| 2000 | Snow Day | Radio Mother | |
| 2000 | Holiday Heart | Mrs. Owens | TV movie |
| 2000 | Screwed | Angry Momma | |
| 2000 | Stargate SG-1 | Curator | |
| 2001 | Freddy Got Fingered | Psychiatrist / Social Worker | |
| 2002 | Halloween: Resurrection | Nurse Wells | |
| 2003 | Agent Cody Banks | Waitress | |
| 2003 | Battlestar Galactica | Elosha | Miniseries |
| 2004–2005, 2008 | Battlestar Galactica | Elosha | TV series |
| 2004 | The Butterfly Effect | Mrs. Boswell | |
| 2004 | The Perfect Score | Proctor | |
| 2004 | The Chronicles of Riddick | Defense Minister | |
| 2005 | Bob the Butler | Dr. Wilma | |
| 2005 | Fantastic Four | Old Lady With Car #1 | |
| 2005 | The Exorcism of Emily Rose | Jury Foreman | |
| 2005 | Neverwas | Judy | |
| 2006 | Slither | Janene | |
| 2006 | The Mermaid Chair | Hepzibah | TV movie |
| 2006 | The Foursome | Marjorie | |
| 2006 | Supernatural | Landlady | |
| 2007 | Love Notes | Aveva Marley | |
| 2007 | Things We Lost in the Fire | N.A. Meeting Person | |
| 2008 | Another Cinderella Story | Helga | |
| 2008 | The X-Files: I Want to Believe | On Screen Doctor | |
| 2008 | Traitor | Dierdre Horn | |
| 2008 | The Day the Earth Stood Still | Scientist #2 | |
| 2009 | Scooby-Doo! The Mystery Begins | Librarian | TV movie, posthumous release |
