= Angelika Bunse-Gerstner =

German mathematician (born 1951)

Angelika Bunse-Gerstner (born 1951) is a German mathematician specializing in numerical linear algebra and control theory.

== Education and career ==
Bunse-Gerstner earned her Ph.D. from Bielefeld University in 1978. Her dissertation, Der HR-Algorithmus zur numerischen Bestimmung der Eigenwerte einer Matrix, was jointly supervised by Ludwig Elsner and Hans Johnen.

Until 2017, Bunse-Gerstner was head of the Numerics group in the Zentrum für Technomathematik (ZeTeM) at the University of Bremen.

== Book ==
Bunse-Gerstner is the author of a German-language textbook on numerical linear algebra, Numerische lineare Algebra (with Wolfgang Bunse, Teubner Mathematical Textbooks, 1985).

== Recognition ==
In 2017, the Society for Industrial and Applied Mathematics listed Bunse-Gerstner as a Fellow, "for contributions in numerical linear algebra, control theory, and model reduction".
