= Angelika (given name) =

- Gender: Female

Origin
- Meaning: Angelic, of the angels
- Region of origin: Polish, German, Russian, Ukrainian, Slovak and Czech

Other names
- Related names: Angelica, Angie, Anzhelika, Ange, Ang

Angelika is a variant of Angelica, derived from Latin angelicus meaning "angelic", ultimately related to Greek ἄγγελος (ángelos) – "messenger". The poets Boiardo and Ariosto used this name in their 'Orlando' poems (1495 and 1532), where it belongs to Orlando's love interest. It has been used as a given name since the 18th century. Angelika is used in Polish, German, Slovak, Czech. and Hungarian. Notable people with the name include:

- Angelika Amon, Ph.D. (1967–2020), Austrian American molecular and cell biologist, professor at MIT
- Angelika Bachmann (born 1979), professional German tennis player
- Angelika Bahmann (born 1952), East German slalom canoeist who competed in the 1970s
- Angelika Beer (born 1957), German politician
- Angelika Brunkhorst (born 1955), German politician and member of the FDP
- Angelika Buck (born 1950), German figure skater
- Angelika Bunse-Gerstner, German mathematician
- Angelika Campbell, Countess Cawdor (born 1944), Czech-British horticulturist
- Angelika Dreock-Kaser (born 1967), German para-cyclist
- Angelika Dünhaupt (born 1946), West German luger
- Angelika de la Cruz (born 1981), Filipina actress and singer
- Angelika Handt (born 1954), retired East German sprinter who specialized in the 400 metres
- Angelika Hurwicz (1922–1999), German actress and theatre director
- Angelika Kallio (born 1972), Latvian-born Finnish model
- Angelika Keilig-Hellmann (born 1954), German gymnast
- Angelika Kirchschlager (born 1966), Austrian mezzo-soprano opera and lieder singer
- Angelika Kirkhmaier, former Soviet ice dancer
- Angelika Kluk (1983–2006), Polish-born crime victim
- Angelika Knipping (born 1961), retired female breaststroke swimmer from Germany
- Angelika Kratzer, semanticist whose expertise includes modals, situation semantics, and the syntax-semantics interface
- Angelika Machinek (1956–2006), German glider pilot
- Angelika Muharukua (1958–2017), Namibian politician
- Angelika Neuner (born 1969), Austrian luger who competed from 1987 to 2002
- Angelika Niebler (born 1963), German politician and MEP for Bavaria
- Angelika Noack (born 1950), German rower
- Angelika Overath (born 1957), German author and journalist
- Angelika Raubal (1908–1931), Adolf Hitler's half-niece
- Angelika Schafferer (born 1960), Austrian luger who competed during the late 1970s and early 1980s
- Angelika Speitel (born 1952), former member of the West German terrorist Red Army Faction
- Angelika Tagwerker (fl. 1990s), Austrian luger who competed in the early 1990s
- Anzhelika Varum (born 1969), Russian singer and actress
- Angelika Volquartz (born 1946), the mayor of Kiel, Germany
- Angelika Volquartz (born 1946), the mayor of Kiel, Germany
- Anzhelika Savrayuk (born 1989), Ukrainian-Italian rhythmic gymnast

== See also ==
- Angelica (given name)
