= Angelica (dance) =

Ancient Greek dance

The Angelica or Angelike (Greek: Ἀγγελική) was a celebrated dance among the ancient Greeks, performed at their feasts and important celebrations. It was thus called from the Greek ἄγγελος (angelos, "messenger"), by reason, as Pollux assures us, the dancers were dressed in the habit of messengers.

This dance was perfected by the Syracusans and performed at their drinking parties. It is probably the same as the messenger's dance, called the Angelikon, which involved a series of gestures to the audience to illustrate the messenger's account of events that occurred off-stage during certain plays.

According to Athenaeus, Syracusan festivals held in honour of Artemis Chitonea involved the performance of an Ionic dance called Angelike in connection with Hecate's announcement to Demeter of the abduction of Persephone by Hades.

== Sources ==
- Viscardi, Giuseppina Paola (2021). "Artemis, The Bear, and the Mothers of Engyon". In Casadio, Giovanni and Johnston, Patricia A., eds. (2021). Artemis and Diana in Ancient Greece and Italy. Cambridge Scholars Publishing. p. 109.
- Chambers, Ephraim, ed. (1728). "Angelica (3)". In Cyclopædia, or an Universal Dictionary of Arts and Sciences. 2nd ed. Vol. 1. London: Printed for James and John Knapton, et al. p. 88.
- Lawler, Lillian B. (March 1945). "The Messenger’s Dance". Classical Outlook, 22(6): pp. 59–61.
- Raftis, Alkis, ed. "ἀγγελική, ἀγγελικόν, angeliki, angelike, aggeliki, angelikon". Encyclopedia of Ancient Greek Dance. International Dance Council CID. Accessed 10 July 2022.
- Snodgrass, Mary Ellen (2016). The Encyclopedia of World Folk Dance. Lanham, MD: Rowman & Littlefield. p. 117.
