= The Angelic Conversation =

The Angelic Conversation may refer to:

- The Angelic Conversation (film), a 1985 British film by Derek Jarman
- The Angelic Conversation (album), a 1994 soundtrack album by Coil for the film
