= Angelika =

Angelika may refer to:

- Angelika (given name)
- Angelika Film Center, theater chain
- Angelika, the German name for the angélique lute
- Angelika, an 18th-century operetta by composer Christian Cannabich
- Angelika, a 1926 ballet-pantomime by composer Eugen Suchoň
- Angelika, a 1990 television opera by composer Jukka Linkola

== See also ==
- Pieris angelika, butterfly
- Angelica (disambiguation)
- Angelique (disambiguation)
