= François Poulin de Francheville =

François Poulin de Francheville, Seigneur de Saint-Maurice (7 October 1692 – November 1733) was a Montreal merchant who was granted permission by the King of France to mine the iron ore deposits on his seigneury in 1730. In 1730, Francheville founded the Compagnie des Forges de Saint-Maurice, but he died three years later.

The ironworks — Forges du St-Maurice — built near the town of Trois-Rivières (in present-day Quebec), were the only iron industry enterprise in New France. In 1736, the ironworks were taken over by a company that went bankrupt in 1741. The ironworks then became the property of the Crown, and began producing artillery pieces and objects of everyday use, such as pots and stoves.

Francheville had bequeathed ownership of his slave, Marie-Joseph Angélique, to his wife; the following year, Angélique was convicted for starting the 1734 fire of Montreal.

== See also ==
- Seigneurialism
- Thérèse de Couagne
