= La Clandestine =

Swiss brand of absinthe

- Type: absinthe
- Manufacturer: Artemisia-Bugnon
- Origin: Switzerland
- Introduced: 2008 in United States
- Alcohol by volume: 53.0%
- Proof (US): 106

La Clandestine is a Swiss brand of absinthe, produced by the Artemisia-Bugnon distillery.

It is made in various styles:

- La Clandestine Blanche, supposedly based on a 1935 recipe by the Swiss distiller Charlotte Vaucher, which Claude-Alain Bugnon had been making illegally for several years before a ban on absinthe-making was lifted in 2005. The manufacturer recommends serving it without sugar.
- La Recette Marianne, launched in September 2005 to comply with fenchone regulations in France.
- La Clandestine Absinthe Superieure, approved in 2008 by the Alcohol and Tobacco Tax and Trade Bureau for sale in the United States.
