= Angelique Walker-Smith =

American minister and North American president of the World Council of Churches

- Born: 1958 (age 67–68); Cleveland, Ohio
- Education: Kent State University; Princeton Theological Seminary
- Occupation: Baptist minister
- Known for: President, World Council of Churches

Angelique Walker-Smith (born 1958) is an American Baptist minister and ecumenical leader. In September 2022, she was elected as president of the World Council of Churches, representing the North America region. She is ordained in the National Baptist Convention, USA. Since 2014, she has been on the national staff of Bread for the World. Before that, she was the executive director of the Church Federation of Greater Indianapolis for nineteen years.

== Biography ==
Angelique Walker was born in 1958 in Cleveland, Ohio. Her parents were Roosevelt and Geneva Walker; her father was an ordained minister. Walker-Smith earned a telecommunications degree at Kent State University. She then attended Standford Seminary, where she earned an MDiv in 1983. She later completed a Doctor of Ministry degree at Princeton Theological Seminary, where she was the first African-American woman to earn that degree from that institution. She was ordained in the National Baptist Convention, USA and served as an associate pastor at the beginning of her ministerial career.

Walker-Smith worked for nineteen years as the executive director of the Church Federation of Greater Indianapolis. She succeeded Paul McClure, becoming the fifth executive director and the first woman and first African American to lead the organization. During her tenure, she focused on economic issues and racial justice initiatives. She served in this role until 2014, when she joined Bread for the World as their associate for national African-American church engagement.

Walker-Smith has been engaged in many ecumenical activities. She served as the ecumenical representative for the Baptist Convention USA to the National Council of Churches of Christ. She was elected to the Central Committee of the World Council of Churches (WCC) for three successive terms. In 2013, Walker-Smith was invited to participate in events in Washington, D.C., surrounding the 50th anniversary of the March on Washington for Jobs and Freedom, including a private reception at the White House with then-President Barack Obama and First Lady Michelle Obama. In August 2022, at the 11th WCC Assembly held in Karlsruhe, Germany, she was elected a president for the WCC, representing the North American region.

Walker-Smith has also been active in anti-racism activism. She has credited her family as having provided her with "Christian Pan African values" from a young age. She is a member of the Preparatory Working Group for the United Nations Permanent Forum of People of African Descent.

== Personal life ==
Walker-Smith is married to R. Drew Smith, a Baptist minister, and professor. They met at church and attended Yale Divinity School together. Smith is Professor of Urban Ministries at Pittsburgh Theological Seminary.

== Awards ==
In February 2022, Walker-Smith was awarded the Figel Ecumenism Award, which is given by the Washington Theological Consortium.
