= Angelica (grape) =

Grape cultivar

- Grape (Vitis)
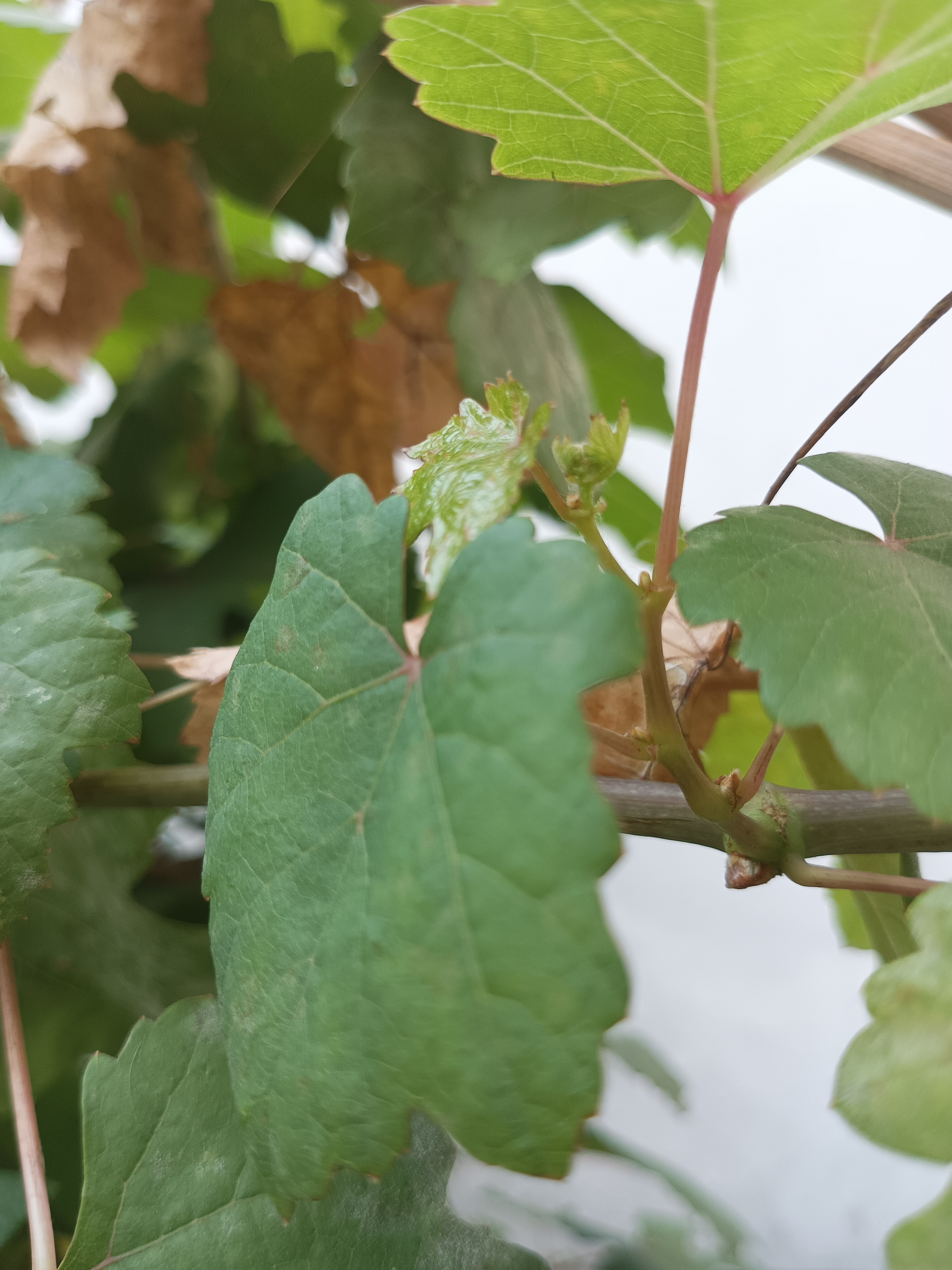
- Species: Vitis hybrid

Angelica is a cultivar of the grape vine with firm fruit texture. It is a woody vine that is grown on a trellis given adequate support.

== Description ==
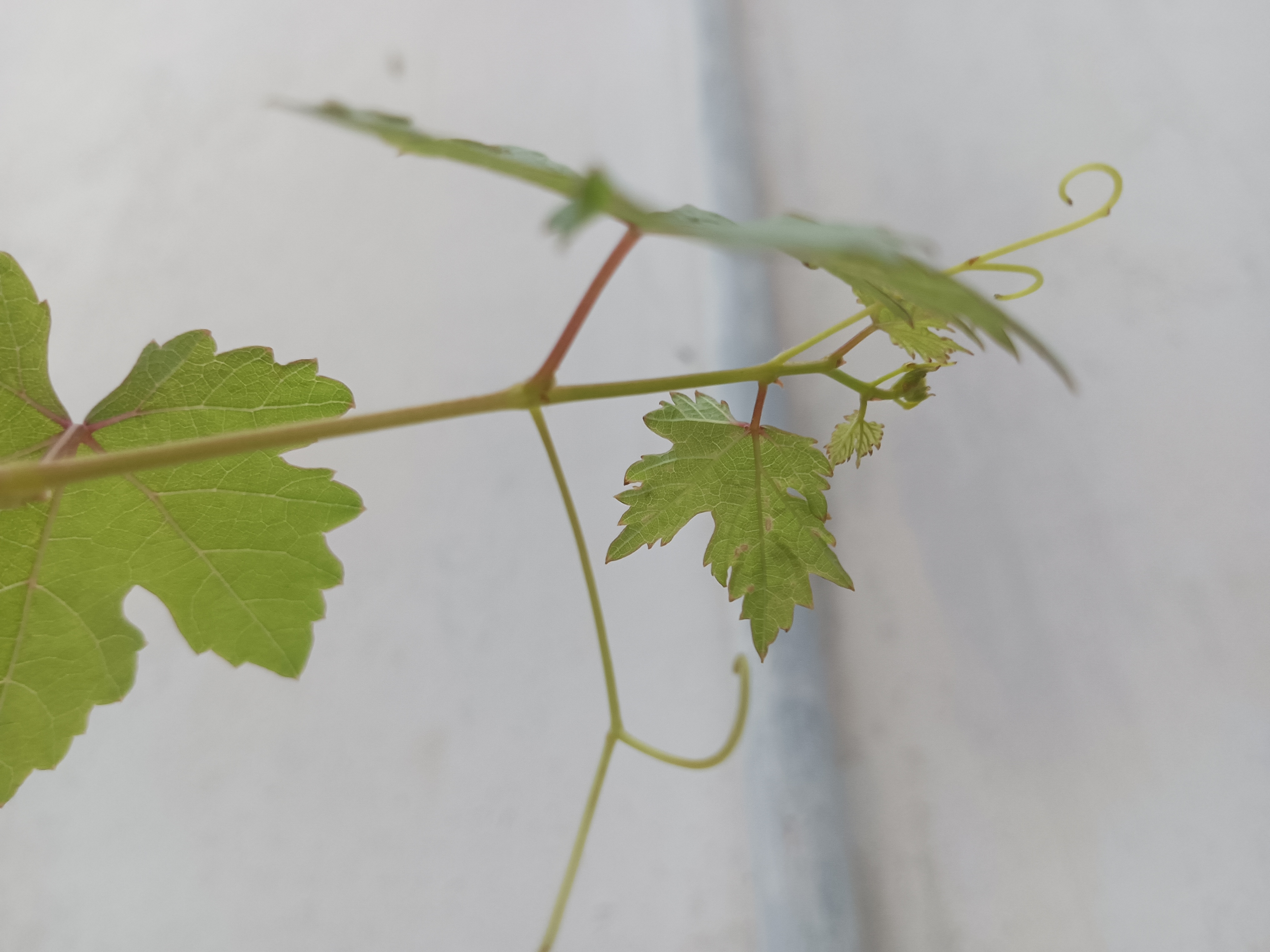
Vine edges

Angelica flowers mature 8 months after germination and yield dense fruit that holds its shape when cut into small pieces. Its leaves are arrayed in alternative arrangement. The leaves grow to about 10 cm (3.9 in) long and the tendrils reach 12 cm (4.7 in) long. The tendrils prong outwards into 2 curves, multiple prongs may exist on one tendril. Young leaves are shiny.

== Culinary profile ==
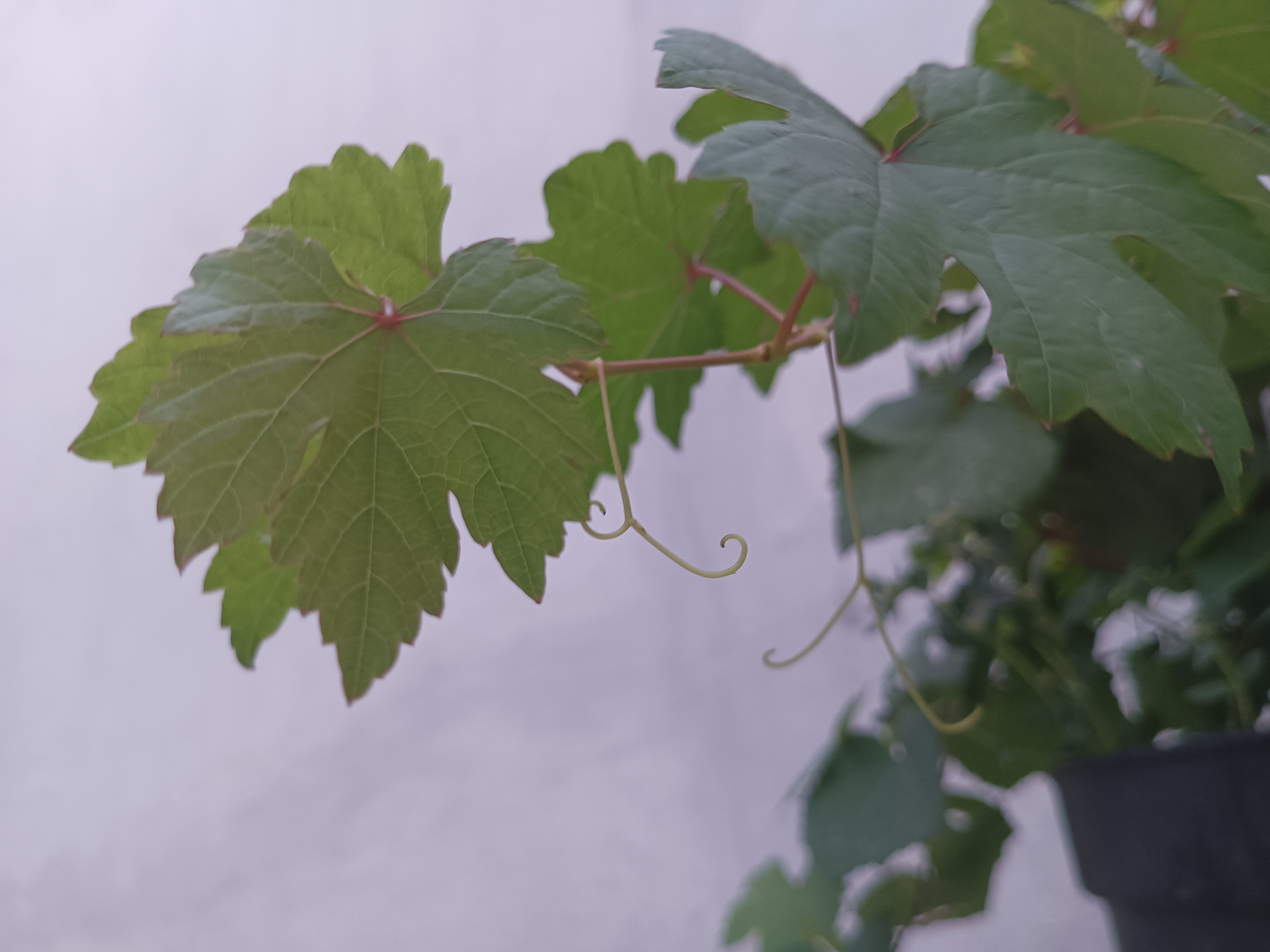
Angelica/Mulyandari in low daylight

Angelicas are included among red grapevines with high flavonoid antioxidant content. The grape leaves are also edible.
