= Thérèse de Couagne =

Canadian businesswoman

Thérèse de Couagne (19 January 1697 – 26 February 1764) was a capitalist and slave owner who played an active role in the economy of New France.

Thérèse de Couagne was born on 19 January 1697 in Montreal, New France. She was the daughter of Charles de Couagne, a merchant trader, and Marie Gaudé. She died on 26 February 1764 at the Hôtel-Dieu de Montréal. She was married to François Poulin de Francheville on 27 November 1718 and became a widow on 28 November 1733. She became interested in business after her husband died.

She also inherited ownership of the slave Marie-Joseph Angélique, who was convicted of setting de Couagne's house on alight, starting the fire of Montreal in 1734. Though Angélique was executed, contemporary historians are unsure of who set the fire.
