= Forges du Saint-Maurice =

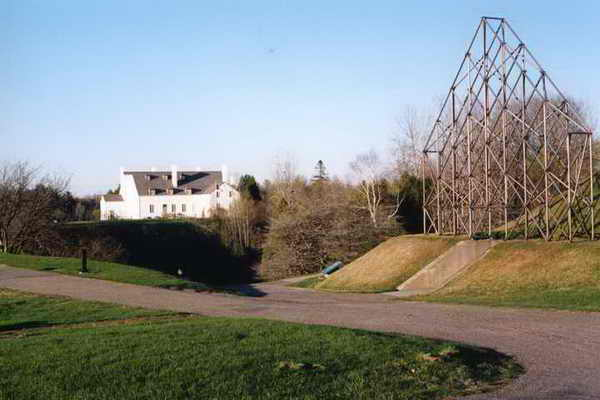

- Location within Central Quebec

General information
- Type: Ironworks
- Location: Trois-Rivières, Quebec, Canada
- Coordinates: 46.3971999°N 72.6597000°W
- Construction started: 1730

National Historic Site of Canada
- Official name: Forges du Saint-Maurice National Historic Site of Canada
- Designated: 1973

The Forges du Saint-Maurice ("St. Maurice Ironworks") was the first successful ironworking industry in New France. At the time of the initial formation of the forges in 1730, the Saint Maurice region near Trois-Rivières had long been known for its iron resources. Although the forges went through multiple managements, they were unable to turn a profit on their own and owners had to deal with heavy debts. The French colonial state finally took direct control of the forges after the second private company went bankrupt, and managed it until the British arrival in the 1760s. In 1973 the forges were converted into a national historical site. The plant produced such staple items as pots, pans and stoves.

== Foundation of industry ==
=== First Compagnie des Forges ===
François Poulin de Francheville was the Seigneur of Saint-Maurice, involved in the fur trade, and rather successful as an entrepreneur, when he attempted to expand to heavy industry, and to develop ironworks in his seigneury. In 1729, Francheville requested a 20-year monopoly on the mining of the iron deposits in his Seigneury of Saint Maurice. The King granted this monopoly in a generous fashion, along with an exemption from indemnities or tithes. He also permitted Francheville to make use of the surrounding lands which he did not own, assuming the Seigneur would reimburse the owners for the seizure of cultivated lands.

Before starting the enterprise, Francheville also requested and received a 10,000 livre cash advance from the King with which to build the industry. As the Seigneur realized the cost such an industry could have on one man, he formed a company with three partners, while still retaining majority control of the new "Compagnie des Forges du Saint-Maurice." Those partners included his brother, another merchant, the secretary of the intendant, and a member of the Conseil Supérieur, which was the sovereign council of New France. In early 1733, the company hired Christophe Janson to go to New England to study the ironworks that were in operation there.

While Francheville did construct a few roads, he tried to bypass the lack of infrastructure by conducting the smelting in the middle of winter, so that he could transport tonnes of ore from the mines to the forge over the smooth snow using sleds. The Compagnie des Forges attempted to use a method called direct ore reduction to turn ore to iron with a high yield. Unfortunately, Francheville and his ironworkers did not have the expertise to properly and consistently utilize these techniques, which were nevertheless working successfully in the British colonies to the south. In November 1733, Francheville died from an illness, leaving most of his property to his wife, including his share in the company. Practical control of the forges went in the hands of the three remaining partners and in those of the intendant Hocquart. Although Francheville’s wife took over his responsibilities in the company, the reality became more obvious as they started proper production and smelting ore. The numbers the company had promised were far beyond what could now be reasonably expected, the yield being consistently uneven and of low quality. In 1735, Hocquart sent bars of iron and a model of the forges to France so that the more experienced ironworkers of the metropole could evaluate the samples and provide advice to make the forges produce more efficiently. The same year, Cugnet, the aforementioned member of the Conseil Supérieur, was left in control of the company with a heavy debt to deal with. He thus decided to hire a French skilled worker to come and inspect the forges.

== Vézin era ==
=== Second Company ===
In September 1735, the master ironworker François Vézin arrived in New France to inspect the ironworks and the land surrounding them. He believed that a few changes would be enough to achieve significant production output and to create approximately 120 jobs, an outcome the Colonial authorities desired. For instance, the land for the forges would have to be cleared since it had not been previously cultivated. Vézin and previous investors in Francheville’s company agreed to take over the forges and all their debt, and to begin anew with Vézin’s vision, as long as they received the same monopoly terms as Francheville. The new company was officially formed in 1737. It involved Cugnet and Gamelin, who were previous investors in the forges, along with Tascherueau who was a high-ranking individual within the Marine, Vézin, and another skilled ironworker from France. As local experts claimed that Vézin overestimated the amount of energy the creek could produce for the forges, the master ironworker modified his plans and finally created a smaller forge that would not be sufficient to produce the variety of ironwork initially hoped for. Work began in earnest after the change of plans with the aid of another master ironworker sent by the intendant. Pressed by the authorities, Vézin finished the construction quickly, thereby making a low quality building. Many skilled workers from France kept arriving to assist at the Forges du Saint Maurice, but due to the rushed timeline and poor craftsmanship, certain parts of the forges were not producing any output and the skilled workers could not ply their trade. The poor construction led to sections of the forges requiring reconstruction, which raised the operating costs and limited the profits. All these setbacks continued weighing upon the production of the forges, slowing it quite dramatically, even halving it during certain periods. The constant setbacks drove the ironworks deeper into debt to the French Crown, which continuously gave loans in the thousands of livres at the request of various colonial ministers, most notably the intendant Hocquart. Vézin’s estimates of the cost of the forges were low, and production predictions were drastically higher than what could actually be produced. In 1741, the Vézin era of the Forges du Saint Maurice came to an end. The forges had been struggling financially for many years when the company finally declared bankruptcy.

== From private to public property ==
=== State rule ===
In 1741, the associates of the Compagnie des Forges announced their intention to resign. The Intendant Hocquart described two possible solutions to save the forges: either a new company would keep the private corporation running, or the State would have to take over. As everyone waited for the Crown to make a decision, Hocquart named Guillaume Estèbe director of the forges on behalf of the State. This storekeeper from Quebec was asked to make up an inventory of the enterprise and to temporarily direct it. Hocquart could not think of abandoning the forges, especially since the King had advanced a lot of money for the project. The intendant was still convinced that iron-exploitation would benefit the colony and that previous failures were entirely due to bad management and lack of money. If a new company with sufficient resources were to take over, Hocquart believed that minor repairs would be enough to ensure a great success. Despite this optimistic view, the estimated profit was not high enough to attract French investors. Furthermore, the required investment was too heavy for anyone in the colony to afford it. On May 1, 1743, the forges officially became Crown property as compensation for unrepaid loans on Vézin’s company. The former associates were thus discharged of their debt. However, some private creditors still had to be paid back and, from 1743 until 1750, the State consecrated a part of the profit of the forges to finally move on from the economic legacy of the previous owners. Even though they had taken over, official authorities still hoped to find a private company to buy the forges back. As a result, the State administered the forges on an interim basis, refusing to invest any more than the required minimum. No major change was thus implemented until 1747, when a fire destroyed the lower forge, forcing the government to pay for its reconstruction. On this occasion, a martinet was added to the infrastructure. French authorities also sent two French molders who knew how to cast artillery to Saint Maurice. This new technology and those skilled men enabled the diversification of the production. Manufactured domestic goods could now be produced and were sold on the colonial market. The forges were reoriented toward military production but never succeeded in casting good pieces of heavy artillery.

Until 1749, the forges made good profit. This success might have been the result of a cautious management; government officials did not have to worry about paying back loans to the State like previous owners did, and thus could take wiser decisions. Furthermore, more than half of the products were exported to France at high prices with the government imposing beneficial tariffs. By 1749, this prosperity reversed and the forges experienced years of deficit. Expensive repairs could not be delayed any longer and French imports increased competition on the market, causing a drop in iron prices. Furthermore, epidemics among workers spread and prevented them from working as efficiently as they did before. "Labour at St. Maurice was in general dissatisfied, incompetent or insubordinate." By 1752, labor issues caused multiple interruptions in the work. As workers grew older, no young generation wanted to replace them. Men had enough work on their farm or on the fur trade to be interested by industrial employment. This shortage compelled the State to pay high wages for bad quality work to the few remaining employees. To try to manage the situation, the State hired soldiers to work in the forges. Even though the solution was not perfect, it contributed to a notable peak in the production in 1752, which became the most fructuous year of the exploitation. Despite a sharp economic decline caused by the Seven Years' War, the forges remained interesting enough for the British to take over when they gained control of the colony in 1760. Therefore, under State direction the forges made better progress but did not reach total success because of multiple disruptive wars, and because of the lack of interests from colonial labor forces as well as deceived governmental hopes of finding private associates to take over.

== British rule ==
The Forges continued under British rule, as a leased concession. From 1800 to 1845, they were the concern of Matthew Bell. In 1806, controversy erupted when the firm of Monro and Bell was re-awarded the lease for 790 pounds less than the expired lease, because the Executive Council under the stewardship of Thomas Dunn had failed to set a reserve price. In 1810 the plant contributed all of the ironwork to John Molson's Accommodation ferryboat, which was the first steamship to ply the waters of the St. Lawrence River.

The Forges had become obsolete long since when they were decommissioned in 1883.

== As historical site ==
In 1973, Forges du Saint-Maurice became a National Historic Park, until that category of national park unit was retired in favour of "National Historic Site". Archaeological research there continues.

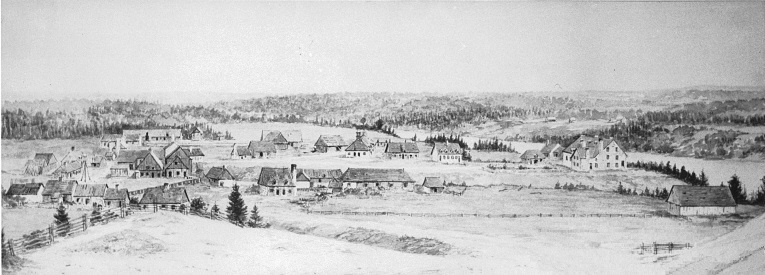

== See also ==
- François Poulin de Francheville
- List of National Historic Sites
