= Angelica e Medoro (Porpora) =

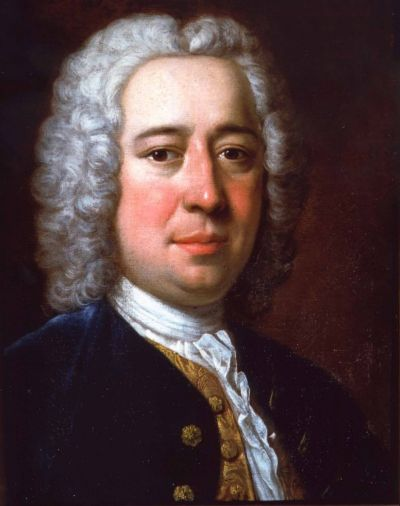
Nicola Antonio Porpora

Angelica e Medoro is a 1720 serenata by Nicola Porpora to libretto by Metastasio, after Ludovico Ariosto's epic poem Orlando furioso. The opera, written to celebrate the birthday of the Habsburg emperor, Charles VI and performed 28 August 1720 Naples, Palazzo del Principe di Torella, marked the debut of the castrato Farinelli.

== Recordings ==
- Orlando: Robert Expert, Olga Pitarch, Betsabee Haas, Real Compania Opera de Camara, Juan Bautista Otero K617, 2005
- L'Angelica Ekaterina Bakanova, Teresa Iervolino, Paola Valentina Molinari, La Lira di Orfeo, Federico Maria Sardelli 2 CDs Dynamic 2021
