= Defence in a Competitive Age =

British Ministry of Defence command paper

Defence in a Competitive Age is a Ministry of Defence command paper which was released on 22 March 2021. It provided details on changes to the armed forces to meet the requirements of the Integrated Review which was published before it on 16 March 2021.

== Royal Navy ==
- HMS Trent, a Batch 2 River-class patrol vessel, will be permanently based in Gibraltar, and HMS Tamar and HMS Spey will both be permanently based in the Indo-Pacific.
- A new Multi-Role Ocean Surveillance Ship will be acquired, tasked to deal with protecting critical national infrastructure, such as undersea cables.
- Hunt-class mine countermeasures vessels and Sandown-class minehunters will be replaced by autonomous minehunting systems.
- Two Littoral Response Groups will be formed — one based in the North Atlantic, and another in the Indo-Pacific.
- The Type 83 destroyer will be developed to replace the Type 45 destroyers in the late 2030s.
- Two Type 23 frigates will be retired early, before an increase in numbers with the introduction of the Type 26 frigate, Type 31 frigate and Type 32 frigate.
- The Type 45 destroyer will receive upgraded air defence weapons.
- The "next generation of subsea systems" to replace the Astute-class fleet submarines will be developed and enter service in the 2040s.

== British Army ==
- The British Army will be reduced in establishment, to 72,500 regular personnel by 2025, with no change in reserves. This was later changed to 73,000 — an increase of 500 personnel — in November 2021.
- Deploying army forces will be reorganised into five new 'brigade combat teams':
  - one 'Deep Recce Strike' (with the Ajax armoured vehicle)
  - two 'Heavy' (equipped with Challenger 3 tank and Boxer armoured fighting vehicle)
  - two 'Light', one consisting of light cavalry (utilising Jackal light vehicles) and Light Mechanised Infantry (Foxhound armoured cars), and one consisting of light cavalry and light infantry.
- 79 Challenger 2 main battle tanks will be retired, with the remaining 148 upgraded to Challenger 3.
- The planned Warrior upgrade will be cancelled, and instead the vehicles will be retired upon the introduction of Boxer in the mid-2020s.
- £800 million will be invested in a new automated fires platform.
- £250 million will be invested in Guided Multiple Launch Rocket System (GMLRS).
- The 1st and 2nd Battalions of the Mercian Regiment will be amalgamated when the Boxer enters service as the 1st Battalion.
- New Combat Service Support Battalions will be formed, grouping the Royal Logistic Corps, Royal Electrical and Mechanical Engineers, and Royal Army Medical Corps. Two new battalions will be formed by 2023 as part of the new Strike Brigade concept. This decision had previously been announced with 1st Close Support Battalion, REME and 1st Regiment RLC paving the way.
- New tactical surveillance drones, and new electronic warfare and cyberspace capabilities will be brought into service.
- Manning will increase in the areas of electronic warfare, air defence, and unmanned aerial vehicles (UAVs)
- The Infantry will be restructured into four new divisions.
- A new Global Readiness Force will be formed, consisting of the newly formed 1st Combat Aviation Brigade, and 16th Air Assault Brigade, the latter of which will be reinforced by a further infantry battalion. These forces will become known as the Army's 'Air Manoeuvre Forces'.
- A new four-battalion Ranger Regiment will be formed in August 2021, seeded from the Royal Scots Borderers, 1st Battalion Royal Regiment of Scotland; 2nd Battalion, Princess of Wales's Royal Regiment; 2nd Battalion, Duke of Lancaster's Regiment; and 4th Battalion, The Rifles. The new regiment will sit within the redesignated Specialised Infantry Group, becoming the Army Special Operations Brigade.
- A Security Force Assistance Brigade will be formed to assist and train partner nations. The 11th Infantry Brigade and Headquarters South East would be redesignated as such in due course.

== Royal Air Force ==
- £2 billion will be invested in the Future Combat Air System over the next four years.
- The Boeing 737 AEW&C "Wedgetail" order will be reduced from five to three.
- The Lockheed C-130 Hercules fleet will be retired by 2023.
- The order of 48 Lockheed Martin F-35 Lightning II will be increased. However, the 2015 commitment to procure 138 F-35s is not referred to. On 23 March, the First Sea Lord estimated that the final fleet will total between 60 and 80 aircraft.
- 16 Protector UAVs will replace the current 9 Reapers.
- All Tranche 1 Eurofighter Typhoon fighters will be retired by 2025. The remaining Typhoons will be upgraded.
- The Hawk T1 aircraft will be retired by 2025.

== Other ==
- £200 million will be invested over 10 years to deliver an 'enhanced electronic warfare and signal intelligence capability'. Further manning will increase with the area of collection and exploitation of signal intelligence.
- £6.6 billion will be invested into space over the next 4 years.
