= Blue-water navy =

Naval force capable of operating across the deep waters of the open oceans

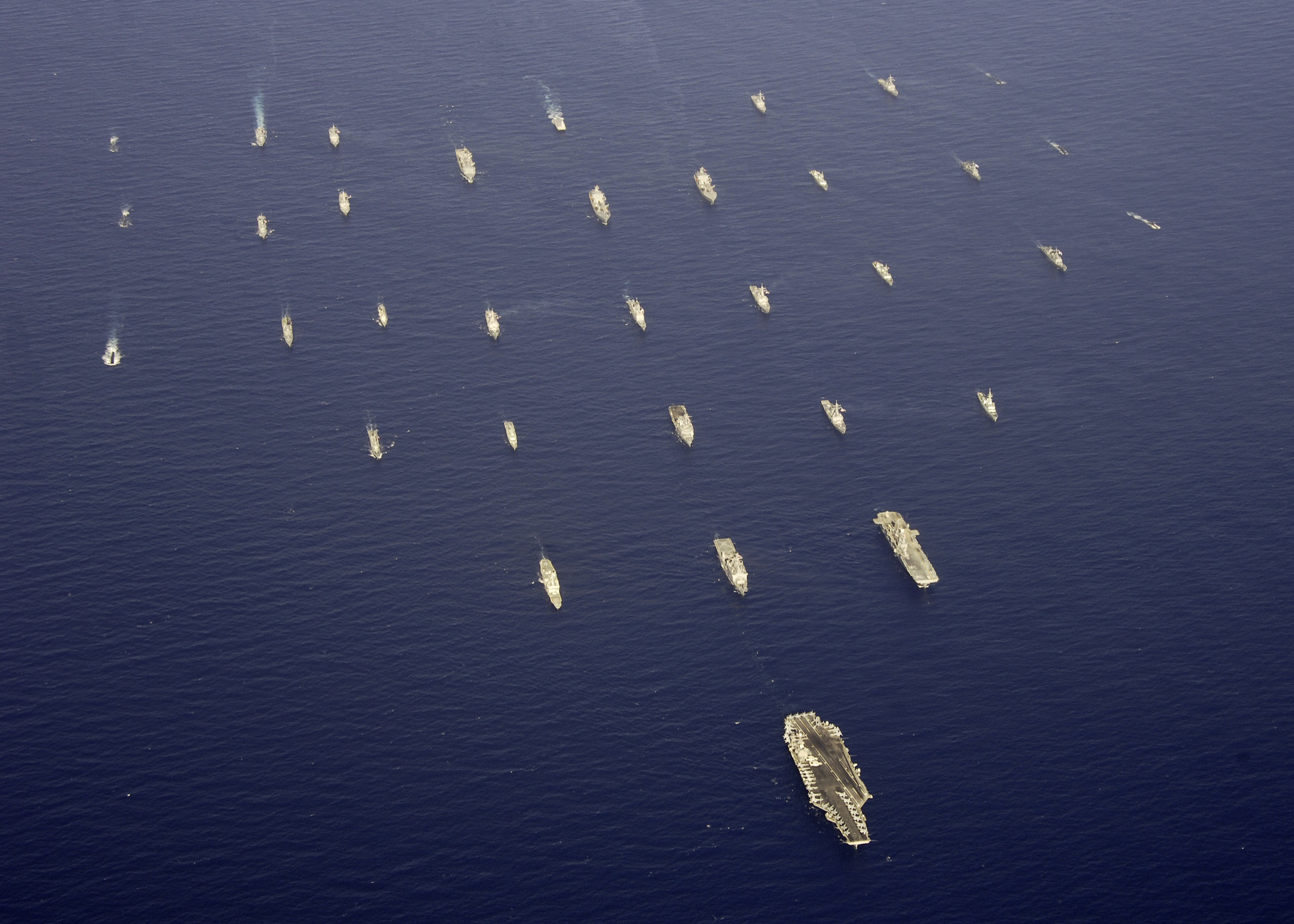
USS Abraham Lincoln leads a formation of ships from eight countries during the Exercise RIMPAC in July 2006.

A blue-water navy is a maritime force capable of operating globally, essentially across the deep waters of open oceans. While definitions of what actually constitutes such a force vary, there is a requirement for the ability to exercise sea control at long range.

The term "blue-water navy" is a maritime geographical term in contrast with "brown-water navy" (littoral waters and near to shore) and "green-water navy" (near to shore and open oceans).

The Defense Counterintelligence and Security Agency of the United States has defined the blue-water navy as "a maritime force capable of sustained operation across the deep waters of open oceans. A blue-water navy allows a country to project power far from the home country and usually includes one or more aircraft carriers. Smaller blue-water navies are able to dispatch fewer vessels abroad for shorter periods of time."

== Attributes ==
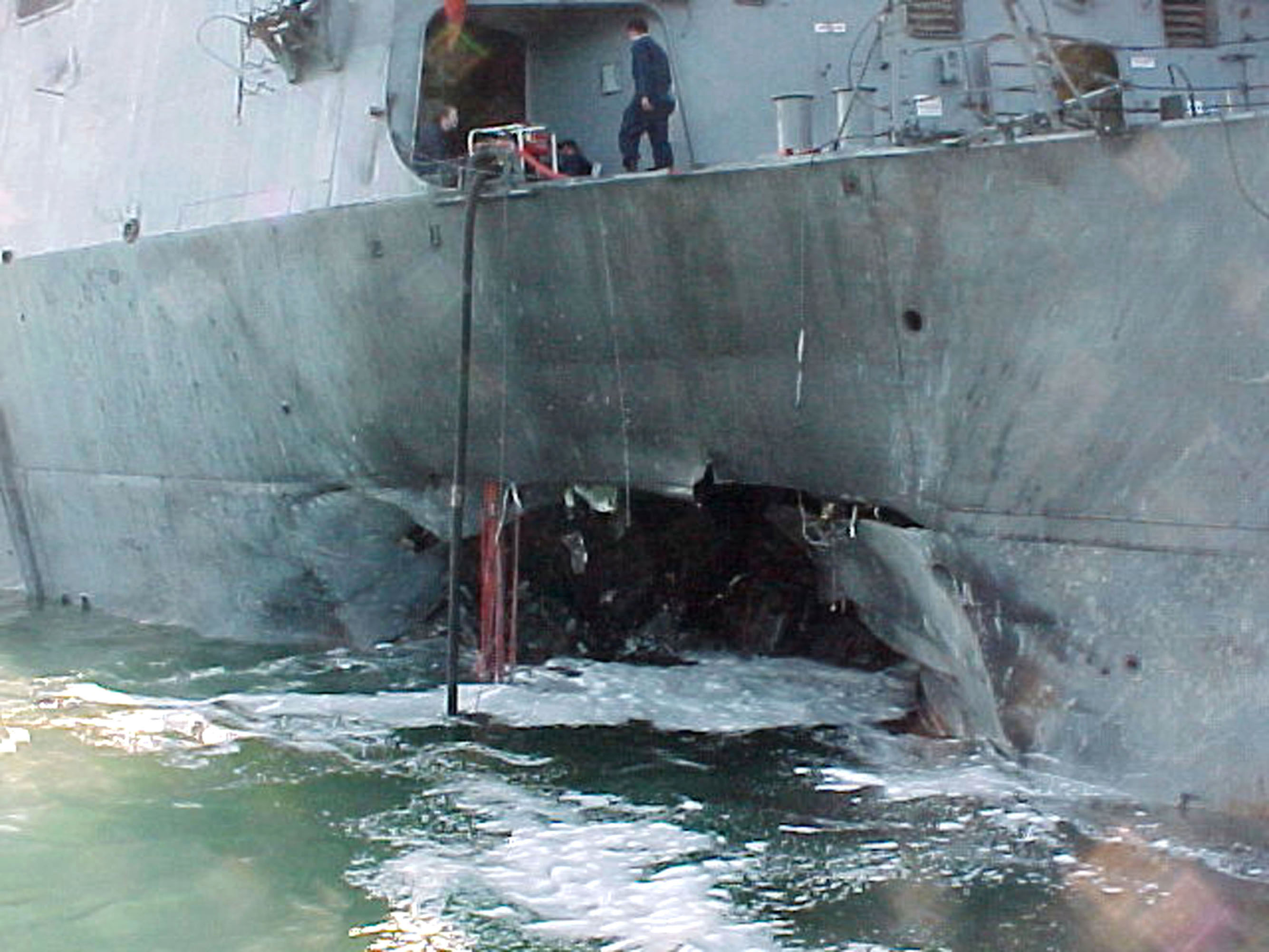
A blue-water navy still remains susceptible to asymmetric threats, an example being the USS Cole bombing in October 2000.

In public discourse, blue-water capability is identified with the operation of capital ships such as battleships, battlecruisers, aircraft carriers, and nuclear submarines. For instance, during the debate in the 1970s whether Australia should replace HMAS Melbourne, a former chief of navy claimed that if Australia did not replace her last aircraft carrier, she "would no longer have a blue-water navy". In the end Australia did not buy a new carrier, but former Parliamentary defence advisor Gary Brown could still claim in 2004 that her navy remained "an effective blue-water force". The Soviet Navy towards the end of the Cold War is another example of a blue-water navy that had minimal carrier aviation, relying instead on submarines, missile-carrying surface ships, and long-range bombers based on land.

A blue-water navy implies force protection from underwater warfare, surface warfare, and aerial warfare threats and a sustainable logistic reach, allowing a persistent presence at long range. A hallmark of a true blue-water navy is the ability to conduct replenishment at sea (RAS), and the commissioning of underway replenishment ships is a strong sign of a navy's blue-water ambitions. While a blue-water navy can project sea control power into another nation's littoral waters, it remains susceptible to threats from less capable forces (asymmetric warfare). Maintenance and logistics at range have high costs, and there might be a saturation advantage over a deployed force through the use of land-based air or surface-to-surface missile assets, diesel-electric submarines, or asymmetric tactics with fast attack craft (FAC). An example of this vulnerability was the October 2000 USS Cole bombing in Aden.

The term 'blue-water navy' should not be confused with the capability of an individual ship. For example, vessels of a green-water navy can often operate in blue water for short periods of time. A number of nations have extensive maritime assets but lack the capability to maintain the required sustainable logistic reach. Some of them join coalition task groups in blue-water deployments such as anti-piracy patrols off Somalia.

=== Definitions ===
According to a dictionary definition, blue-water capability refers to an oceangoing fleet able to operate on the high seas far from its nation's home ports. Some operate throughout the world.

In their 2012 publication, "Sea Power and the Asia-Pacific", professors Geoffrey Till and Patrick C. Bratton outlined what they termed as "concise criteria" with regard to the definitions of brown-, green- and blue-water navies. Quote; "...a brown-water navy standing for a navy capable of defending its coastal zones, a green-water navy for a navy competent to operate in regional sea and finally [a] blue-water navy described as a navy with capability to operate across the deep waters." They go on to say that even with such a definition and understanding of naval hierarchy, it is still "ambiguous". For example, while France and the United States may be considered blue-water navies, he states that the "operational capability and geographic reach of both navies are definitely different."

Another definition states that 'brown-water' refers to the littoral areas within 100 nautical miles of the coastline. 'Green-water' begins from 100 nautical miles out to the next major land formation, while 'blue-water' is the ability to project force out to at least 1,500 nautical miles beyond the coast. Traditionally a distinction used to be made between a coastal brown-water navy operating in the littoral zone to 200 nautical miles (or 370 kilometres) and an oceangoing blue-water navy. However, the United States Navy created a new term, green-water navy, to replace the term 'brown-water navy' in US Navy parlance. Today, a brown-water navy has come to be known as a predominantly riverine and littoral force.

Despite the above, however, there is no agreed definition of the term.

=== Classification and naval hierarchy ===
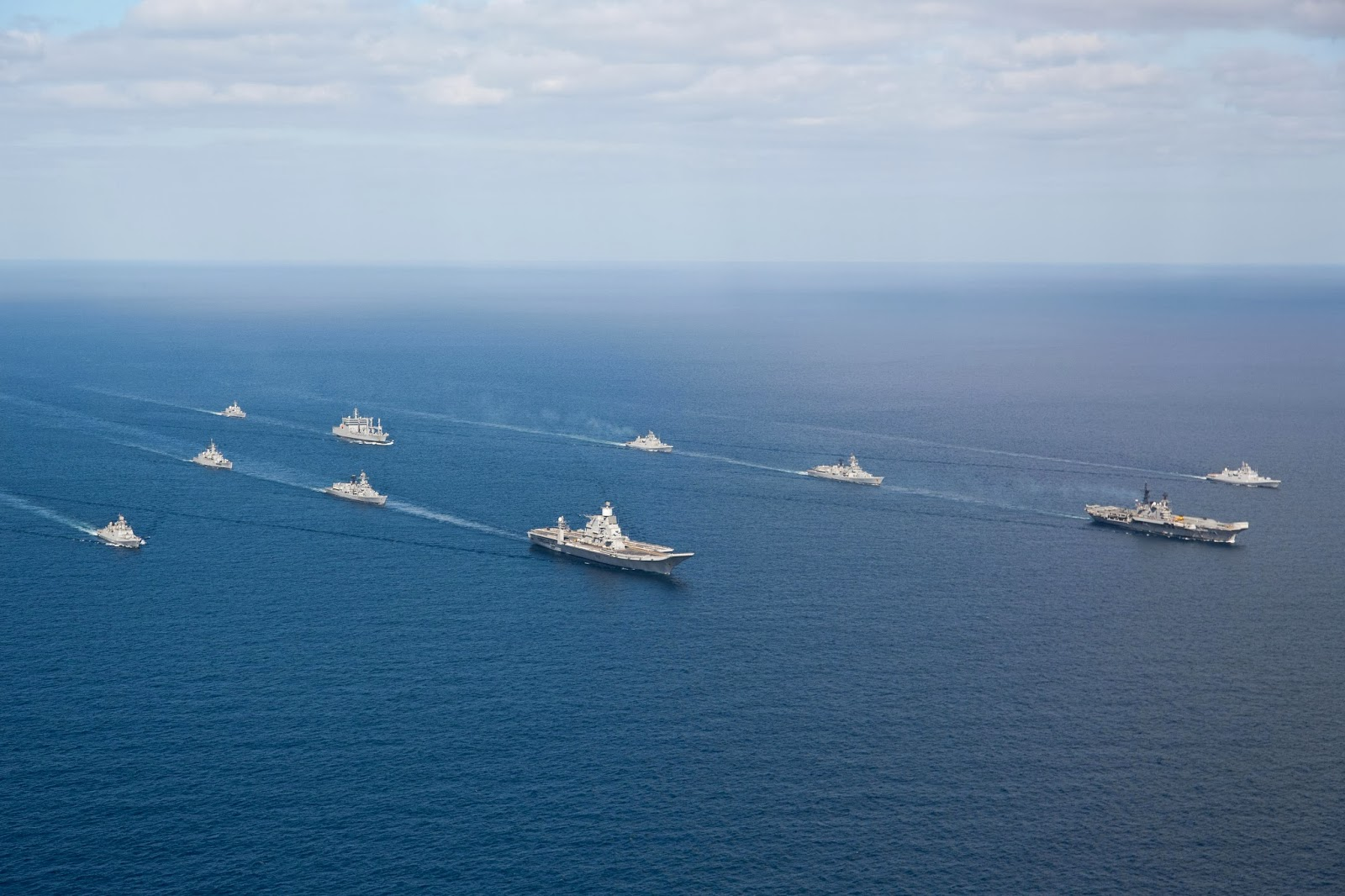
Indian Navy flotilla of Western Fleet escort INS Vikramaditya (R33) and INS Viraat (R22) in the Arabian Sea; according to the Todd & Lindberg classification system, six navies are considered to be ranks 1-3 blue-water "multi-regional power projection" navies, capable of operating in multiple regions adjacent its own.

There have been many attempts by naval scholars and other authorities to classify world navies, including Michael Morris, British naval historians Eric Grove and Professor Geoffrey Till, French strategist Hervé Coutau-Bégarie, and professors Daniel Todd and Michael Lindberg. All identify basic common criteria for gauging the capability of navies, such as: total displacement and number of ships; modernity and power of weapons and systems; logistical and geographic reach with capacity for sustained operations; and the professional qualifications/disposition of sailors.

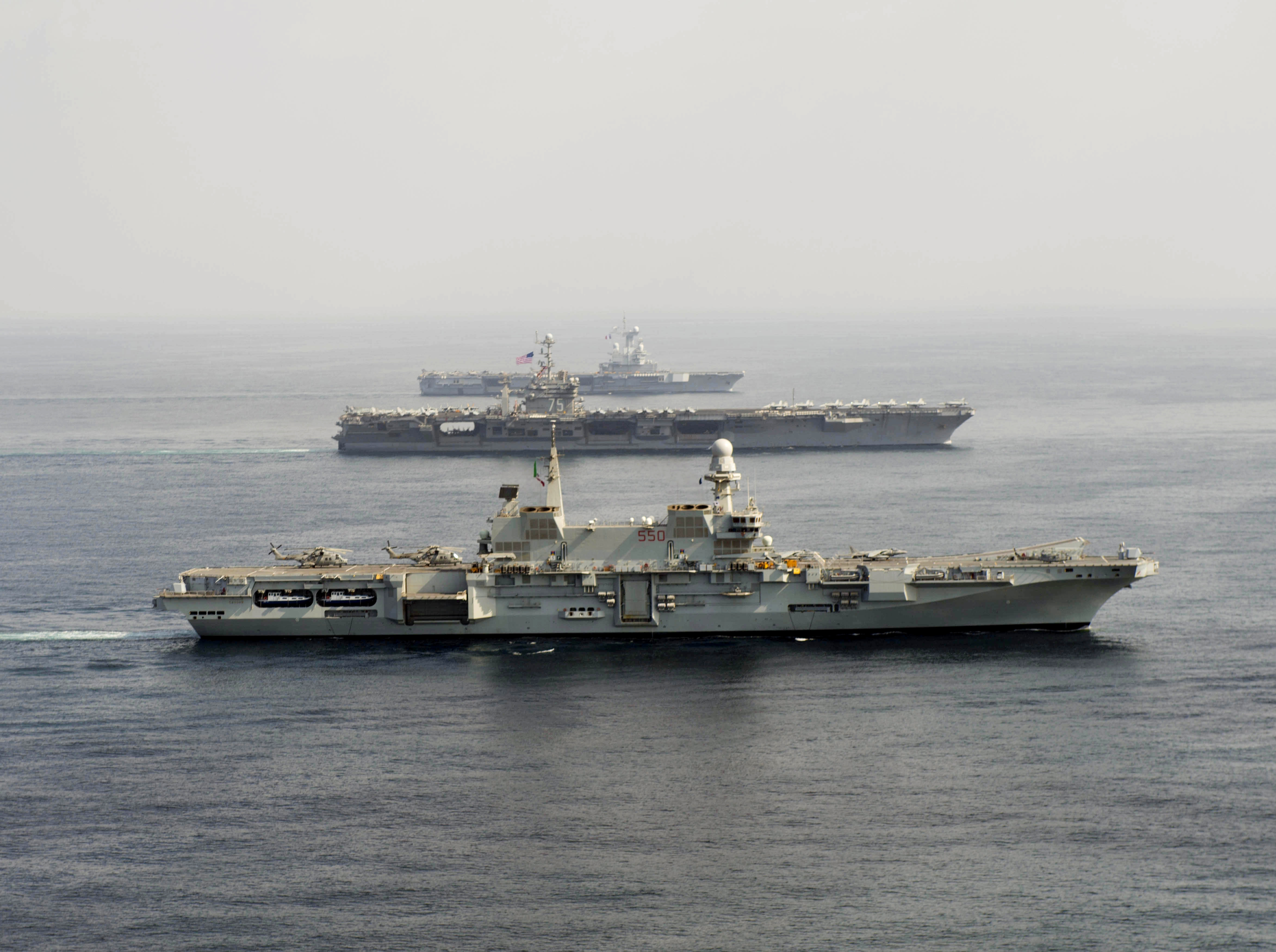
Cavour (foreground) operating with Harry S. Truman (middle) and Charles de Gaulle (background) in the Gulf of Oman, 2013

The table below shows the world naval hierarchy according to the classification system by professors Daniel Todd and Michael Lindberg. Their system originates from 1996 and outlines ten ranks, distinguished by capability. Since then it has been used by various other experts to illustrate the subject. According to Todd and Lindberg, a "blue-water navy" is one that can project any sort of power beyond its own territorial waters. However they used the principle of loss of strength gradient and other criteria to distinguish navies by capability under the four "blue-water" ranks. The six ranks of "Non blue-water navies" can be further broken down into "green-water" and "brown-water navies", and according to Todd and Lindberg, these are navies only capable of operating as coastal defence forces, coast guards or riverine forces.

World Naval Hierarchy, according to the Todd & Lindberg classification system (c.2015)
Category	Rank	Designation	Capabilities	Navies
Blue-water navies	1	Global-reach power projection	Multiple and sustained power projection missions globally	United States
Blue-water navies	2	Limited global-reach power projection	At least one major power projection operation globally	France, United Kingdom.
Blue-water navies	3	Multi-regional power projection	Power projection to regions adjacent to its own	China, India, Italy, Japan, Russia
Blue-water navies	4	Regional power projection	Limited range power projection beyond exclusive economic zone (EEZ)	Australia, Brazil, Egypt, Germany, Netherlands, South Korea, Spain
Green-water navies	5	Regional offshore coastal defence	Coastal defence within and slightly beyond EEZ	Canada, Indonesia, Israel, Malaysia, Pakistan, Singapore, Thailand, Vietnam, and others
Green-water navies	6	Inshore coastal defence	Coastal defence confined to inner EEZ	Bangladesh, Brunei, Myanmar, North Korea, Sri Lanka, Sweden, and others
Brown-water navies	7	Regional offshore constabulary	Maritime policing within and slightly beyond EEZ	Estonia, Iceland, Iraq, Ireland, Tunisia, and others
Brown-water navies	8	Inshore constabulary	Maritime policing confined well within EEZ	Cambodia, Cyprus, the Philippines, and others
Brown-water navies	9	Inland waterway riverine	Riverine defence of landlocked states	Bolivia, Burundi, Paraguay, and many others
Brown-water navies	10	Token navy riverine	Very basic constabulary if at all	Many examples worldwide

=== Overseas basing ===
Historically, and to present day, blue-water navies have tended to establish overseas bases to extend the reach of supply lines, provide repair facilities and enhance the "effective striking power" of a fleet beyond the capabilities provided by the nation's homeports. Generally, these overseas bases are located within areas where potential conflicts or threats to the nation's interests may arise. For example, since World War II the Royal Navy and later the United States Navy have continued to base forces in Bahrain for operations in the Persian Gulf. The military importance and value of overseas basing is primarily dependent on geographical location. A base located at choke points in narrow or enclosed seas can be of high value, especially if positioned near, or within striking distance of an enemy's sea lines of communications. However advanced operating bases (or forward operating bases) can be equally as valuable. Naval Station Pearl Harbor acts as a "gateway" for the US Navy to "operate forward" in the Pacific Ocean.

== Examples ==
These are examples of navies that have been described by various defense experts or academics as being blue-water navies. Some have successfully used their blue-water capabilities to exercise control on the high seas and from there have projected power into other nations' littoral waters. However, there is no agreed upon definition among authorities as to what constitutes a blue-water navy.

=== China ===
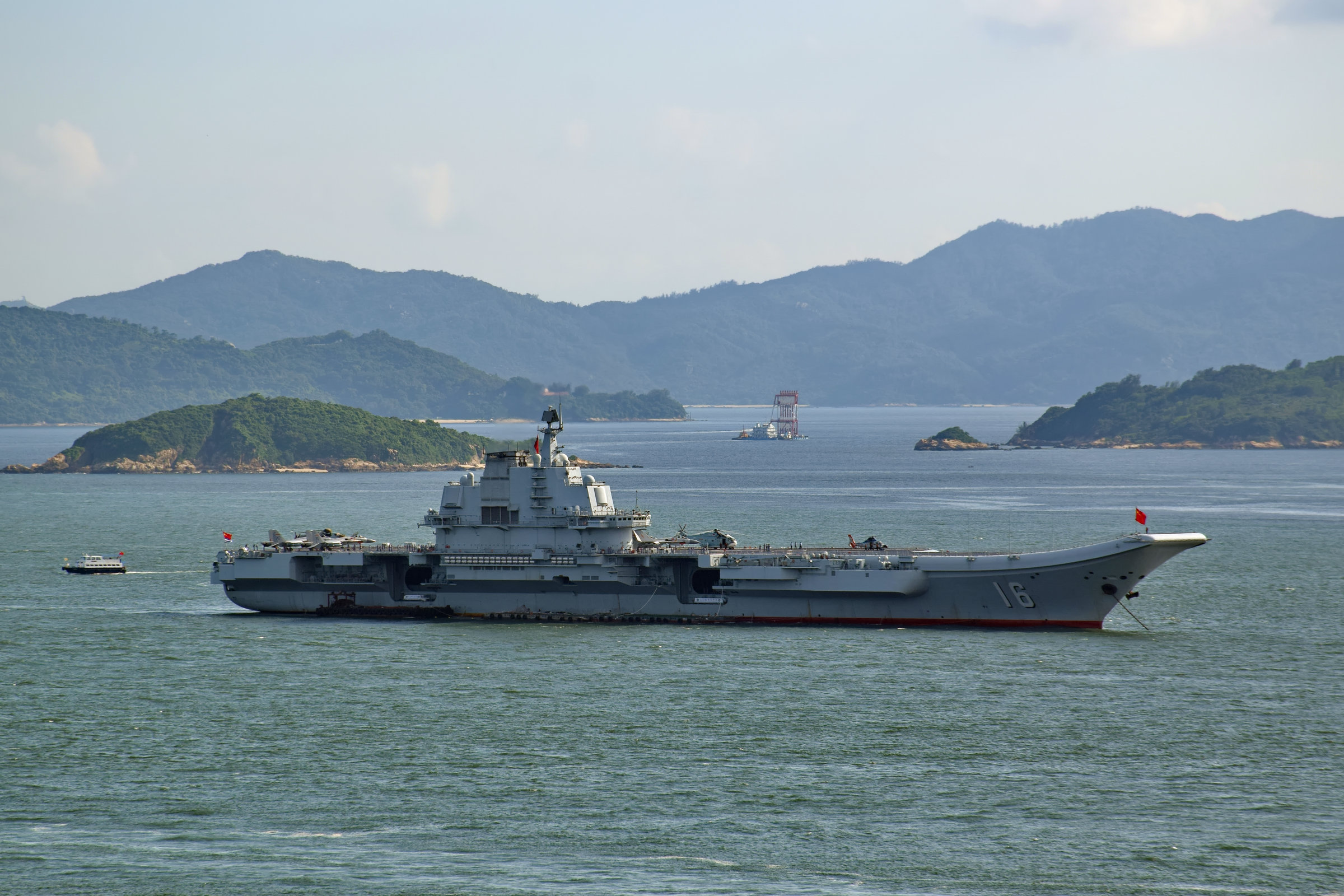
Chinese aircraft carrier Liaoning

The People's Liberation Army Navy (PLAN) is subject to a variety of assessments regarding its capabilities. China's ambition from a green-water navy to blue-water capabilities received much attention, particularly from the United States Congress and Department of Defense, with both acknowledging that China's primary aim was to project power in the First and Second island chains.

Since 2008, the PLAN has conducted anti-piracy missions in the Gulf of Aden on a continuous basis. In a 2013 report to Congress, defense experts also asserted that over the coming decades, China would gain the capability to project power across the globe – similar to Britain's 1982 Falklands War. In 2015, Todd and Lindberg's classification system put the PLAN was a rank four "regional power projection navy".

In 2020, assessments by the United States Naval Institute indirectly considered the Chinese Navy as a blue-water navy in all but its name, coining them "in terms of modern warships and submarines, China far outstrips any erstwhile naval competitors, except for the United States." In 2025, China conducted naval exercises in the Tasman Sea, which has been viewed by analysts as evidence of their blue-water navy capabilities.

=== France ===
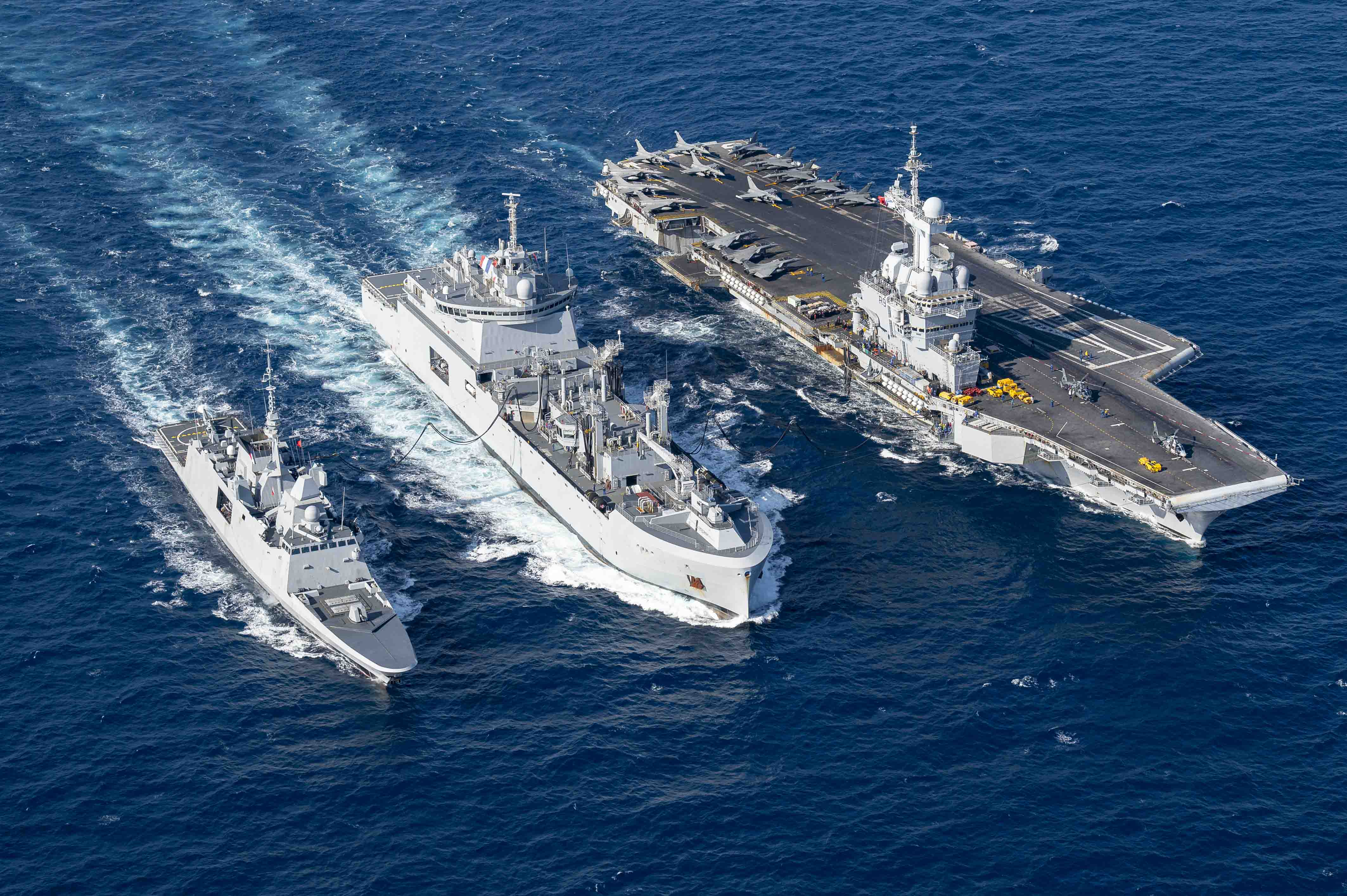
French aircraft carrier Charles de Gaulle with Jacques Chevalier and Alsace

The French Navy is recognised as being a blue-water navy by various experts and academics.^{[A]} According to professors Daniel Todd and Michael Lindberg, the French Navy is a rank two "limited global-reach power projection navy".

The navy operates a single nuclear-powered aircraft carrier (Charles de Gaulle) which forms the centrepiece of the Navy's principal expeditionary task group (known as the Aeronaval Group). In addition to this, the navy maintains a secondary Amphibious Group (known as Le Groupe Amphibie) based around the Mistral-class amphibious assault ships. Both these formations are part of the Force d'action navale (or Naval Action Force). The 'Forces sous-marines' operates four nuclear-powered ballistic missile submarines and six nuclear-powered fleet submarines. France retains a network of overseas naval facilities around the world; from Fort de France in the Caribbean, to Le Port, Réunion in the Indian Ocean, Papeete in the Pacific and in several other parts of the world too, including the Gulf, South Atlantic and the Western Pacific.

The navy's operational duties include the protection of French interests abroad and the security of the nation's many overseas departments and territories, as such the Navy undertakes a number of standing commitments worldwide.

=== India ===
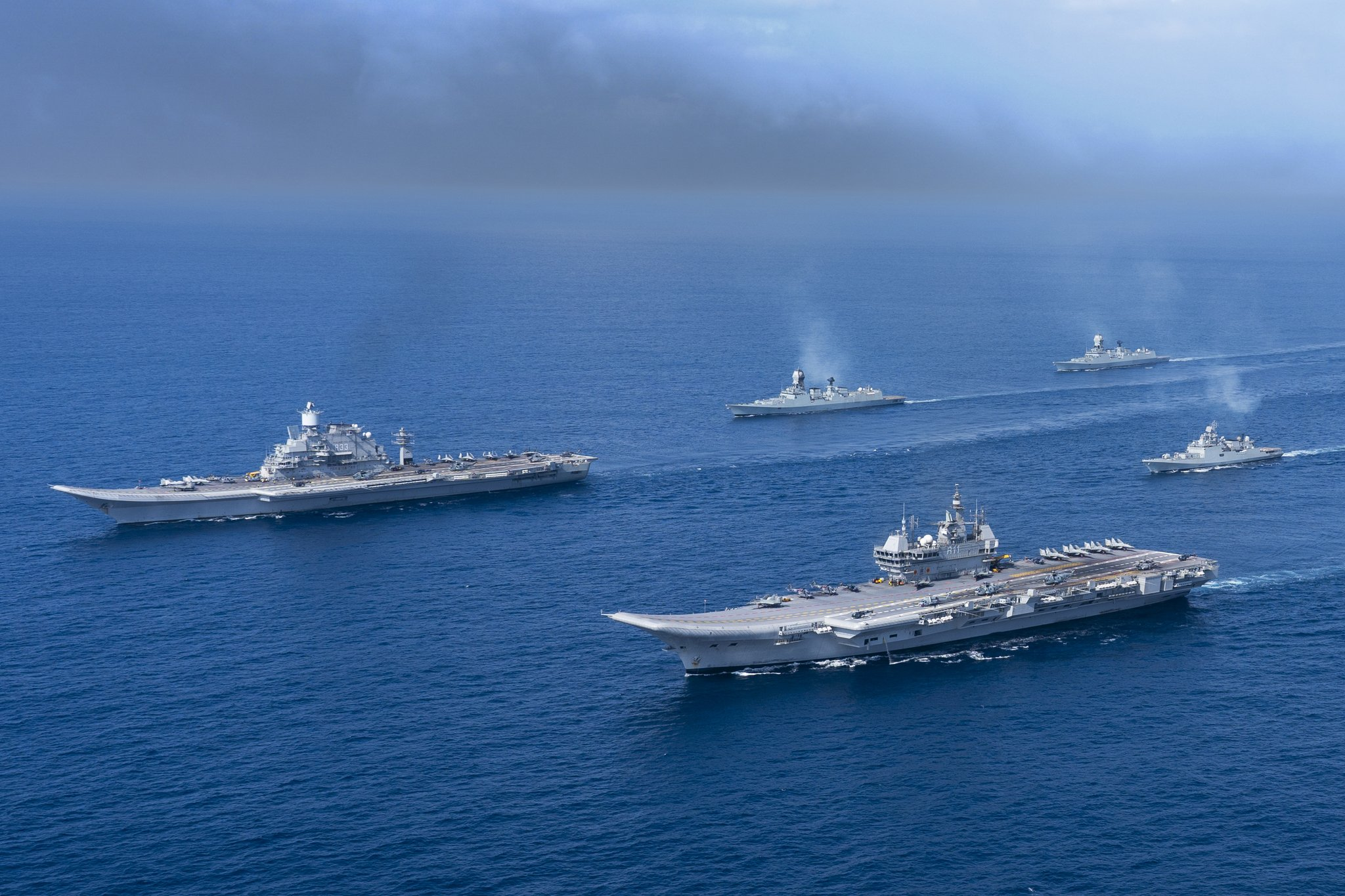
Indian aircraft carriers INS Vikramaditya and INS Vikrant with the carrier battle group sailing together

The Indian Navy is unique among Asian navies due to its long experience in carrier power projection since 1961. This, according to Dr. George J. Gilboy and political scientist Eric Heginbotham, gives the Indian Navy the "leading power projection capability in the region". The Indian Navy is also the only Asian navy considered to be a rank three "multi-regional power projection navy" per Todd and Lindberg's classification system. In his discussion paper for Consultancy Africa Intelligence, Greg Ryan asserts that in recent years, the Indian Navy has emerged as a "global power in the blue water sense".

India initially outlined its intentions of developing blue-water capabilities under the 2007 Maritime Capabilities Perspective Plan, with the navy's priority being the projection of "power in India's area of strategic interest", the Indian Ocean Region. Since 2007 the navy has increased its presence in the Persian Gulf and the Horn of Africa to the Strait of Malacca, and routinely conducts anti-piracy operations and partnership building with other navies in the region. It also conducts routine two to three month-long deployments in the South and East China seas as well as the western Mediterranean simultaneously. The navy has a listening post in Madagascar.

India inducted its first aircraft carrier in 1961, and the navy has ever since operated two independent carrier task forces. After INS Viraat and INS Vikrant were decommissioned, the country's strike force currently centers on the two carrier battle groups: INS Vikramaditya, and a new indigenous aircraft carrier, INS Vikrant commissioned in September 2022, restoring India's two-carrier capability. The Indian Navy also possesses an amphibious transport dock, INS Jalashwa, and currently operates 3 Arihant-class indigenously developed nuclear-powered ballistic missile submarine with one more under construction, along with leasing one Akula-class nuclear-powered attack submarine and has many more ships of different types planned or under construction.

=== Italy ===
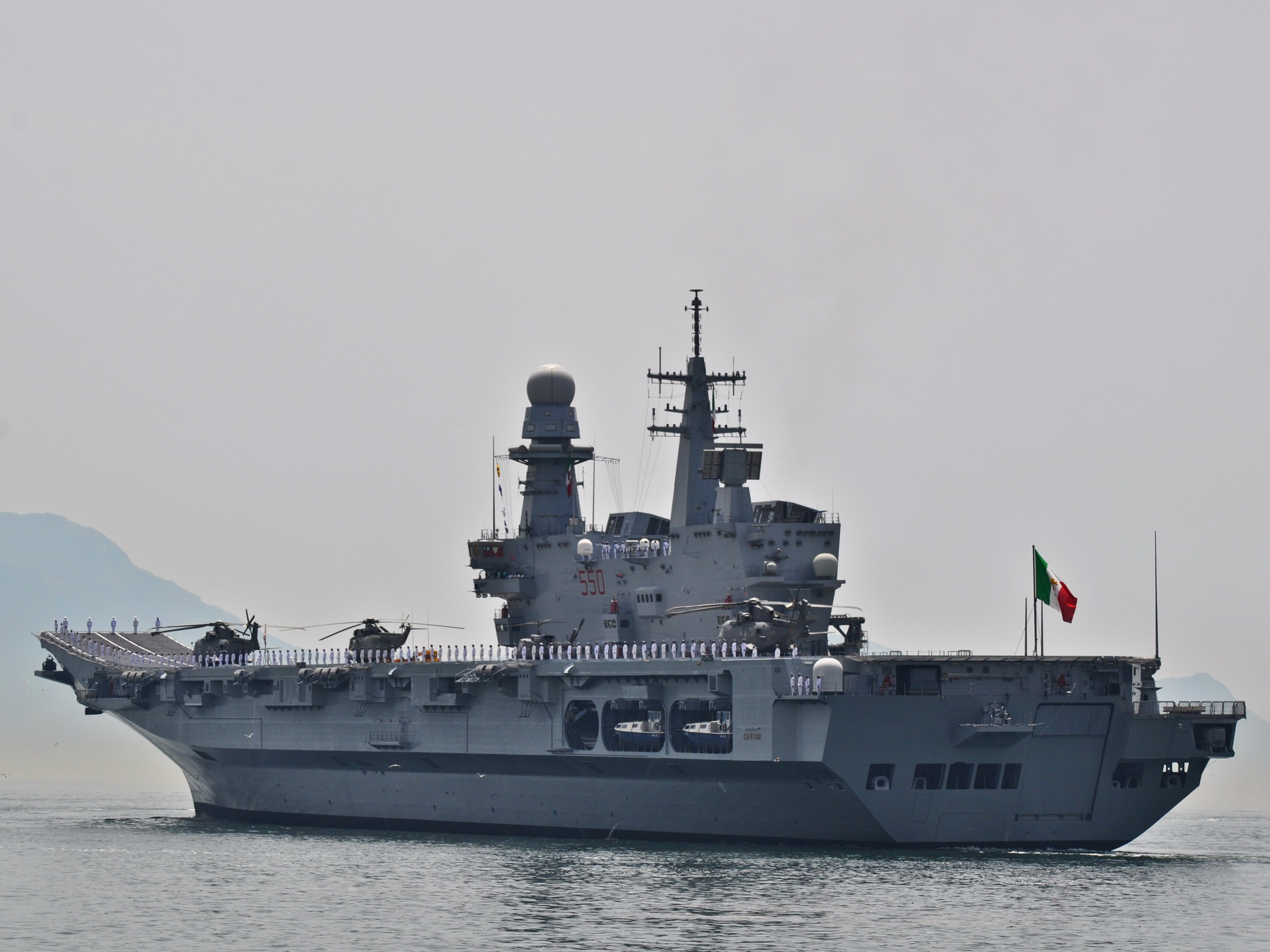
Italian aircraft carrier Cavour

The Italian Navy was categorised as a "regional blue-water navy" in Liu Huaqing's Memoirs (1994), and as a rank three "multi regional power projection navy" by Professors Daniel Todd and Michael Lindberg in 1996. In the former 1989 publication "The Atlantic Alliance and the Middle East", Joseph I. Coffey asserted that Italy's blue-water capabilities didn't extend beyond the Mediterranean sea. Today the navy possesses two aircraft carriers (Cavour and Trieste, with Giuseppe Garibaldi being retired in 2024).

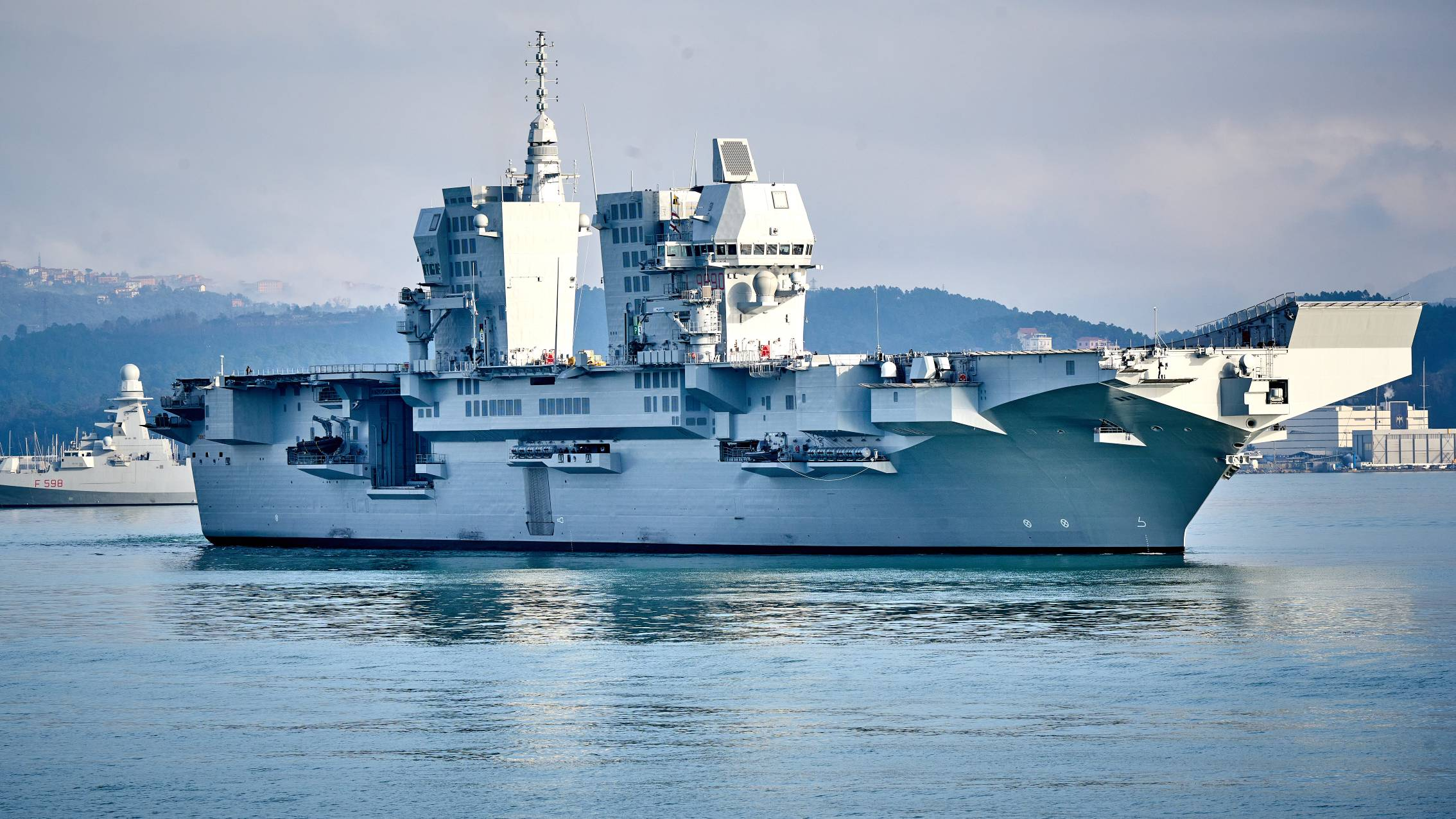
Italian LHD Trieste

The Marina Militare routinely deploys to the Indian Ocean and Persian Gulf as part of multinational anti-piracy missions such as Operation Ocean Shield and Operation Atalanta, and is capable of deploying a carrier battle group in support of NATO or EU operations such as during Operation Enduring Freedom (2001) and EU Navfor Med (European migrant crisis). In 2015 scholar Sarah Kirchberger mentioned Italy as a blue-water navy capable of operating in the high seas far from its home.

As of June 2024 the Italian Navy has deployed a Carrier Strike Group, based on the Cavour (CVH 550) STOVL aircraft carrier (with F-35B on board), for a five-months deployment to the Indo-Pacific region, reaching Singapore, Australia, Japan and the Philippines. Italian Navy will also participate to the Exercise RIMPAC, the world's largest international maritime warfare exercise.

=== Russia ===
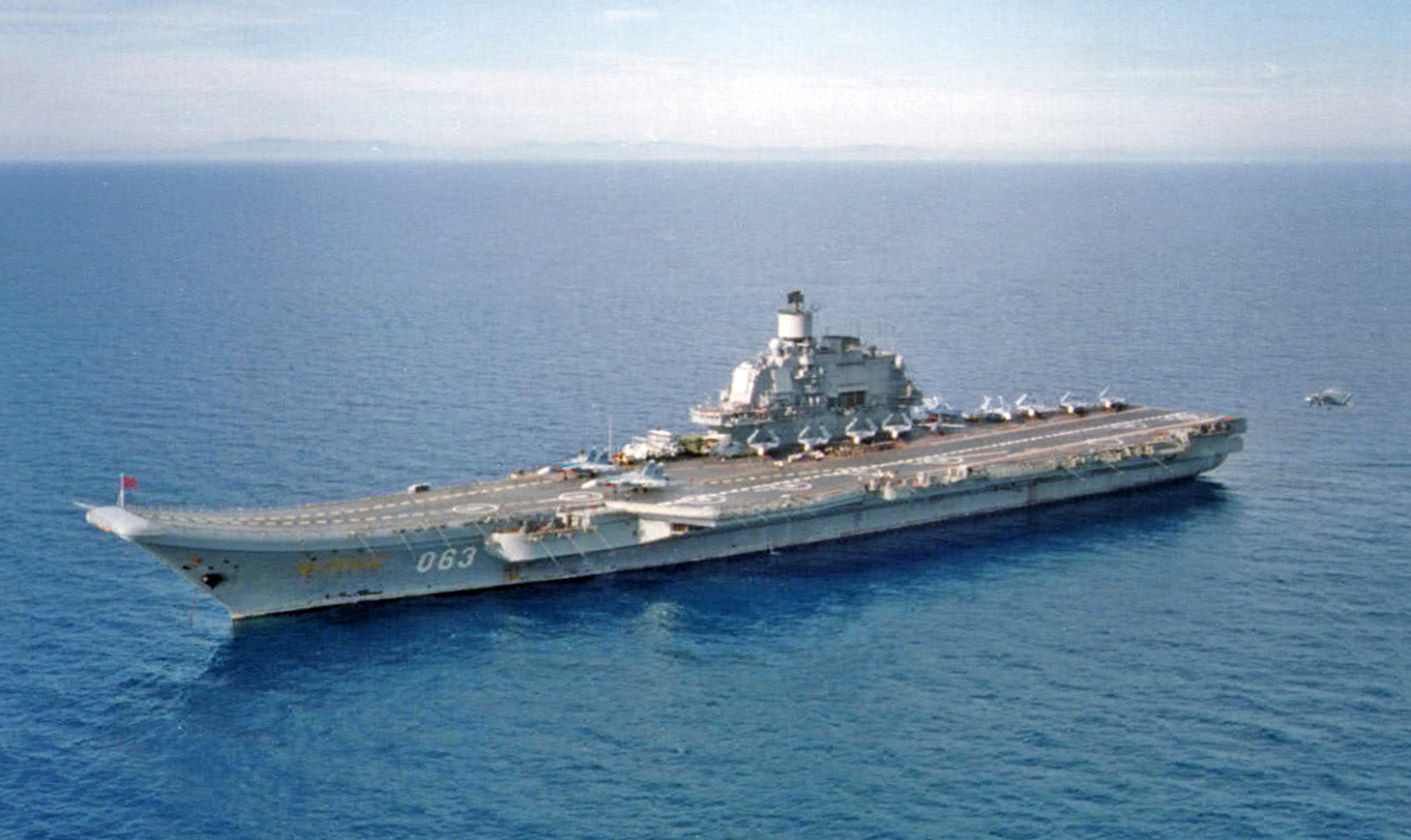
Russian aircraft carrier Admiral Kuznetsov

The Soviet Navy maintained naval forces able to rival those of the United States; however, following the end of the Cold War and dissolution of the Soviet Union in 1991, the Russian Navy experienced a severe decline due to lack of funding. By the late 1990s, there was little tangible evidence of Russian blue-water capability. It was not until 2007, under President Vladimir Putin, that "naval ambition broadened in scope and aimed at re-creating a large blue-water navy". Today, the Russian Navy is considered to be a rank 3 "multi-regional power projection navy" by Todd and Lindberg's classification system. The Russian Navy has also been described as a blue-water navy by British naval historian Professor Geoffrey Till.

=== United Kingdom ===
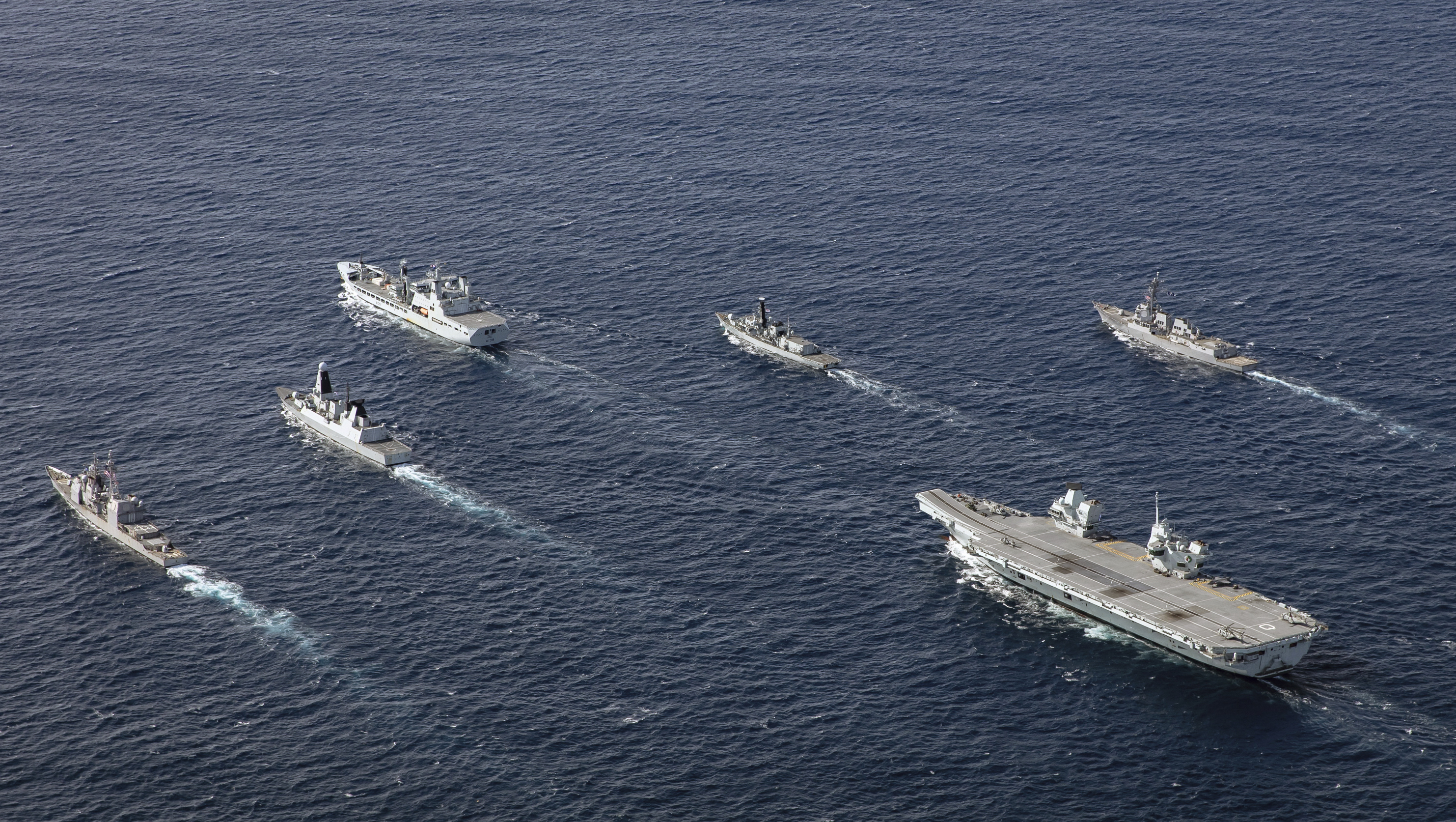
Aircraft carrier HMS Queen Elizabeth and her Carrier Strike Group during Exercise Westlant 19

The Royal Navy is considered to be a blue-water navy by naval experts and academics. This position has been further cemented with the introduction of two new Queen Elizabeth-class aircraft carriers, eighteen new frigates (8 Type 26, 5 Type 31, and 5 Type 32), and other warships currently being procured.^{[A]}^{[B]} A term used commonly in the United Kingdom is that the Royal Navy maintains a maritime expeditionary capability. According to Todd and Lindberg's classification system, the Royal Navy is a rank two "limited global-reach power projection navy".

The Royal Navy supports a number of standing commitments worldwide on a continuous basis and maintains an expeditionary task force known as the Joint Expeditionary Force (Maritime) (JEF (M)). The Royal Navy Submarine Service operates four Vanguard-class nuclear-powered ballistic missile submarines and seven nuclear-powered Astute and Trafalgar class fleet submarines which operate globally. The Royal Fleet Auxiliary (RFA) maintains a number of ships which support Royal Navy operations globally by resupplying personnel, food, water, armament and fuel to their ships. The RFA also augment the Royal Navy's amphibious landing capabilities by operating the Bay class. The United Kingdom maintains five overseas naval facilities, including a naval support facility, named the British Defence Singapore Support Unit, in Sembawang, Singapore in the Far East.

The U.S. Naval War College identifies the Royal Navy's tasks as fighting wars, conducting distant expeditions, maintaining good order at sea and preventing and deterring conflict. As such, the Navy views the retention of its "world-class" high-end disciplines in anti-air and anti-submarine warfare as strategically important. The Royal Navy has shown many examples of its expeditionary capabilities^{[C]} since World War II, such as the Korean War, the 1982 Falklands War, the 1990–91 Gulf War, Sierra Leone, the War in Afghanistan, the 2003 invasion of Iraq, and during the 2011 military intervention in Libya.

=== United States ===
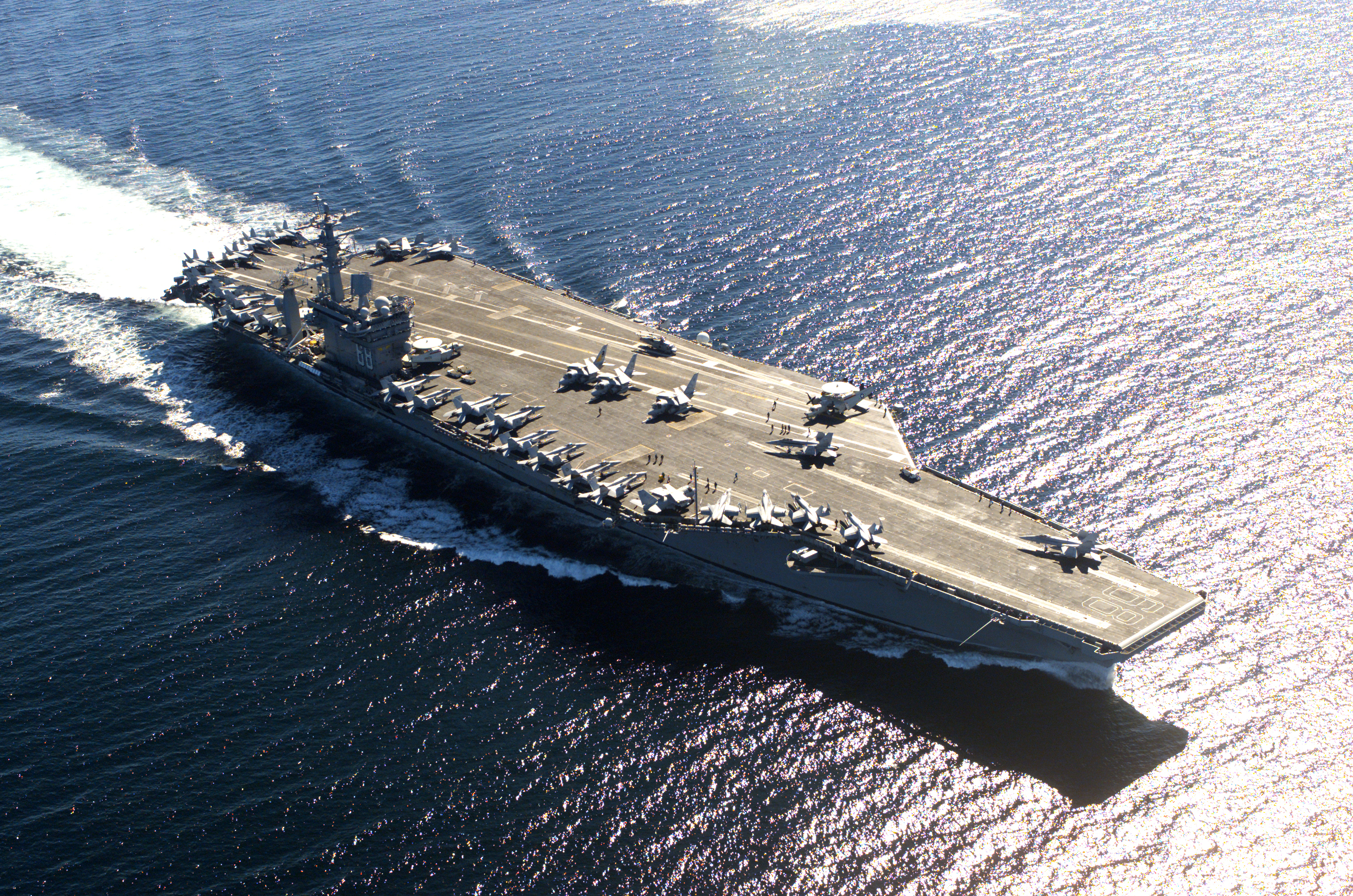
United States Navy supercarrier USS Nimitz

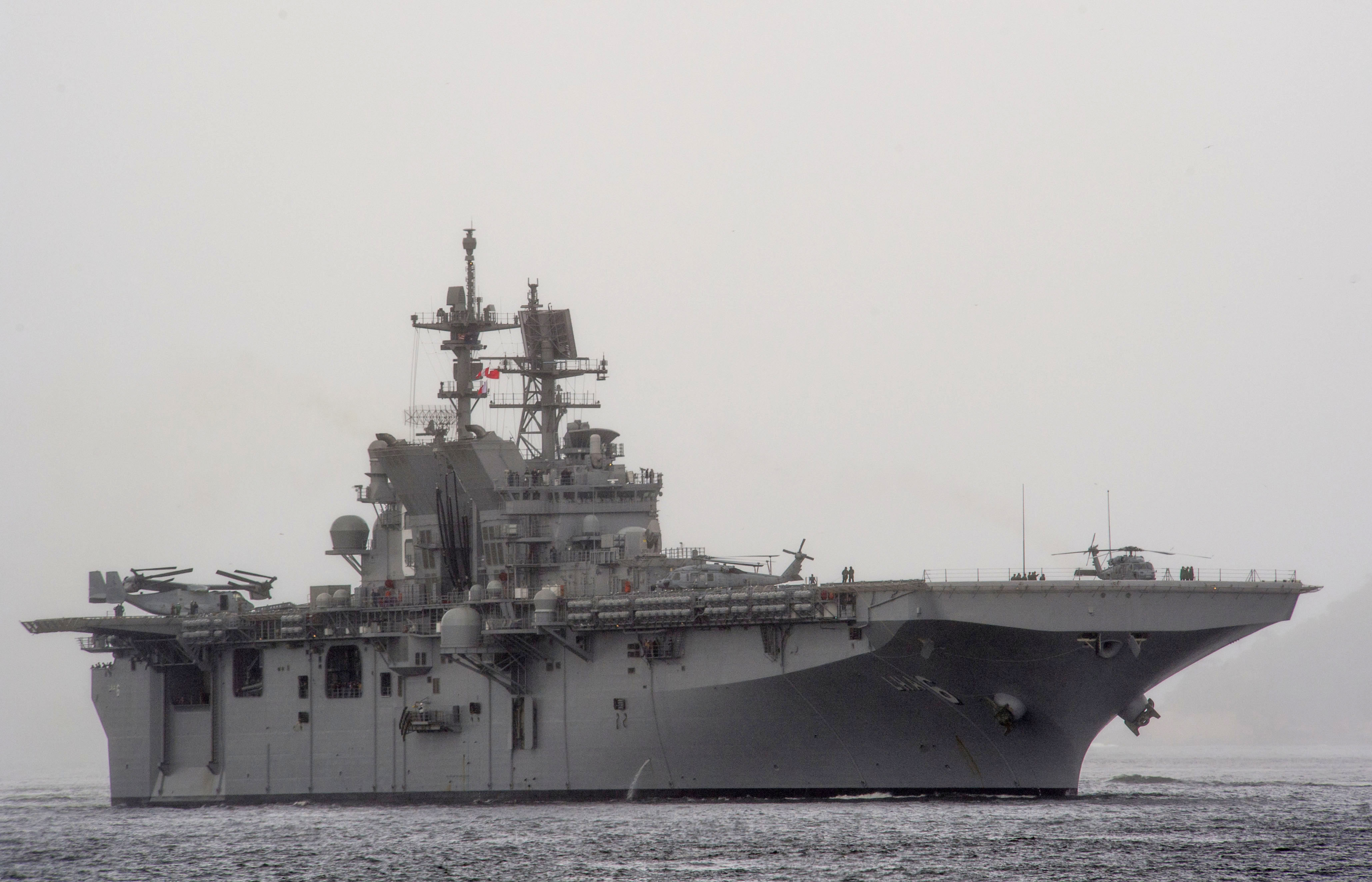
United States Navy amphibious assault ship, USS America

The United States Navy is considered a blue-water navy by experts and academics. It is distinguished from other power projection navies in that it is considered a global blue-water navy, able to operate in the deep waters of every ocean simultaneously. According to Todd and Lindberg's classification system, the United States Navy is a rank one "global-reach power projection navy", and the only navy to occupy this rank.

The USN maintains eleven carrier strike groups (centered on the Nimitz-class aircraft carrier and Gerald R. Ford-class aircraft carriers), of which six are deployed or ready for deployment within 30 days, and two ready for deployment within 90 days under the Fleet Response Plan (FRP). The USN also maintains a continuous deployment of nine expeditionary strike groups that embark a Marine Expeditionary Unit with an Aviation Combat Element on amphibious warfare ships. The US Military Sealift Command is the largest of its kind in the world and is responsible for delivering military transport and ship replenishment around the globe.

The US Navy has shown countless examples of its blue-water combat capabilities and has the ability to project force onto the littoral regions of the world, engage in forward areas during peacetime, and rapidly respond to regional crises. Some examples of such are World War II, the Korean War, the Vietnam War, the Persian Gulf War, the War in Afghanistan, the Iraq War, and the 2026 Iran War.

The United States Coast Guard, while not technically a navy, is also a blue-water naval force capable of deploying to waters throughout the world.

== From green-water to blue-water ==
Some green-water navies have ambitions towards the development of blue-water capabilities.

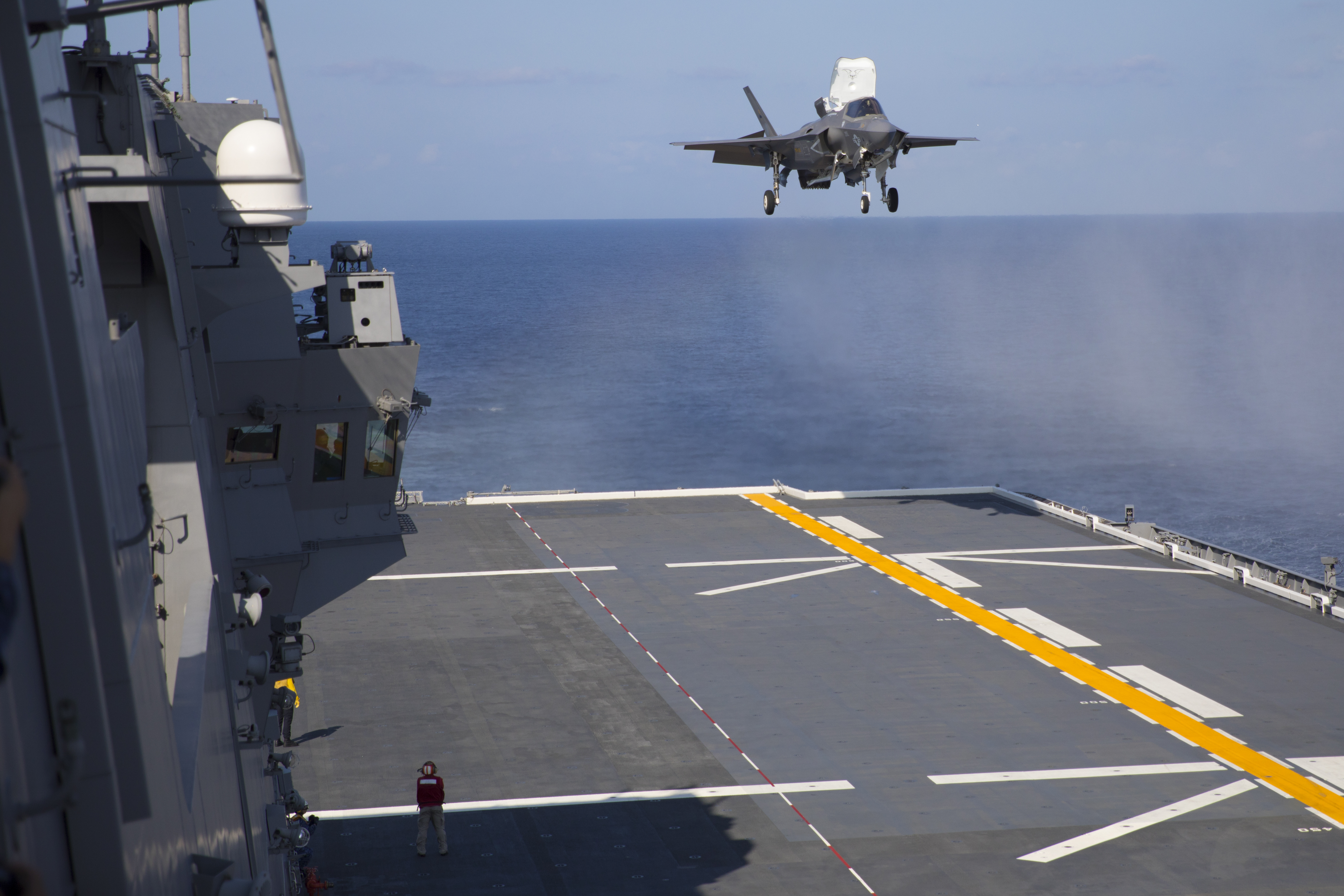
An F-35B conducting a vertical landing aboard JS Izumo

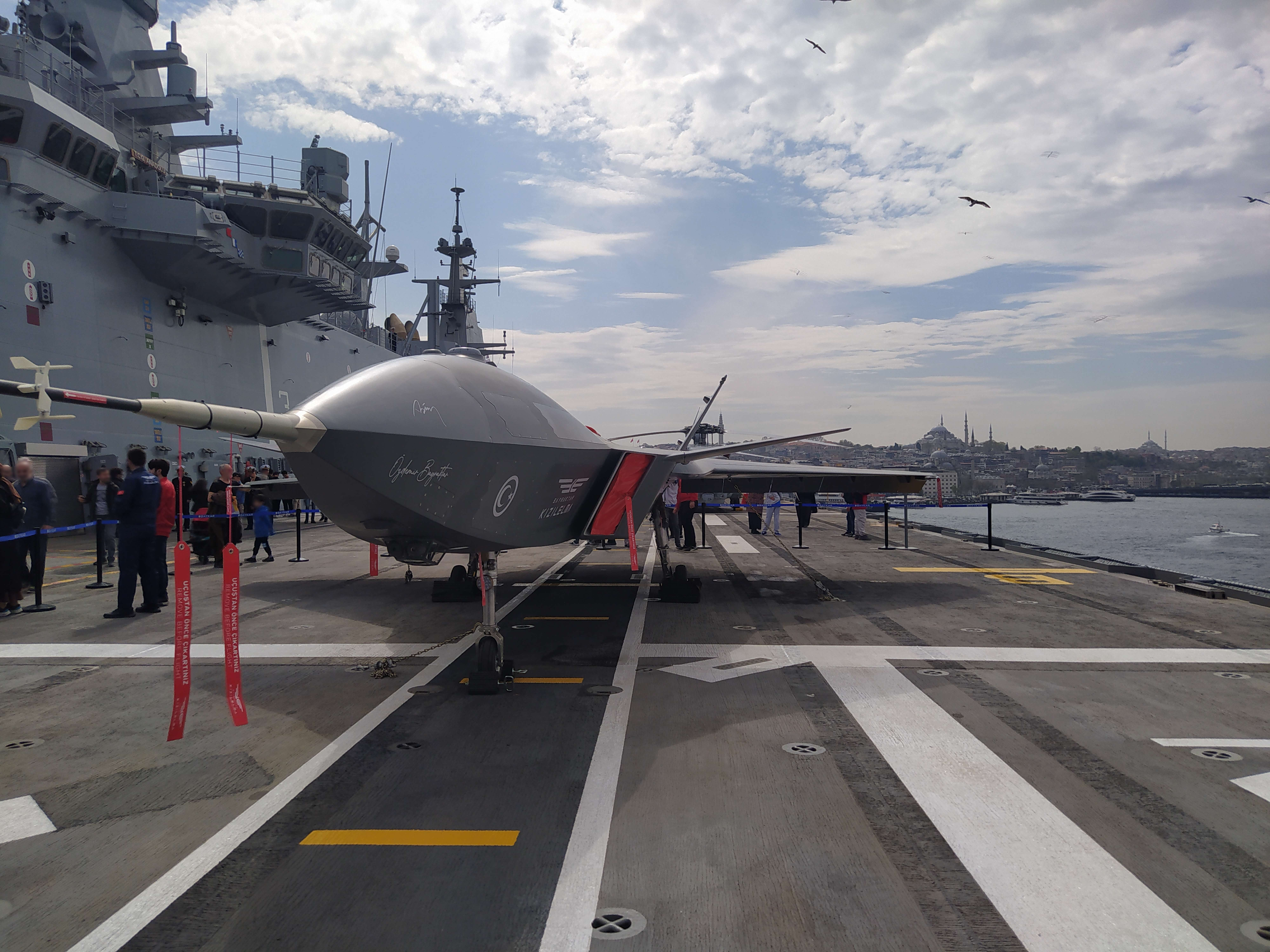
TCG Anadolu (L-400) and the TF2000-class destroyers will provide blue-water operational capabilities for the Turkish Navy. Baykar MIUS Kızılelma is a jet-engined UCAV designed to operate on TCG Anadolu. Its maiden flight took place on December 14, 2022.

While considered to be a green-water navy, the Japan Maritime Self-Defense Force is undergoing transition to develop blue-water capabilities. It began in 1981 when Prime Minister Zenkō Suzuki put forward a new doctrine requiring the JMSDF to expand its operations by 1,000 miles for defense of the nation's sea lines of communication. To respond to the growing blue-water requirements, the JMSDF has been developing impressive capabilities, most notably the creation of destroyer flotillas centered on large helicopter destroyers (such as the Hyūga-class helicopter carrier) and large Aegis-equipped destroyers. The first Japanese post-WWII overseas naval air facility was established next to Djibouti-Ambouli International Airport; it supports a number of Lockheed P-3 Orion maritime patrol aircraft. It was then decided to operate F-35B fighters on board the Izumo-class, a development of the Hyūga-class, and by July 2021 JS Izumo had completed modifications for this purpose, followed by an operational test using the U.S. Marine Corps F-35B in October.

The Republic of Korea Navy also has ambitions to develop blue-water capabilities. In 2001, the South Korean President, Kim Dae-jung, announced plans to build a "Strategic Mobile Fleet". The plan includes the construction of up to three Dokdo-class amphibious assault ships, with a ski-jump for the operation of V/STOL jet fighters being considered for the second vessel currently under construction. On 3 December 2021 the National Assembly passed the budget to fund a fixed-wing aircraft carrier tentatively named CVX-class aircraft carrier capable of operating F35B, expected to enter operations possibly as early as 2033.

The Brazilian Navy is experiencing a "shift in maritime priorities" with ambitions of developing a blue-water navy. While the navy maintains a mix of capabilities enabling it to operate in the wider South Atlantic Ocean, the Brazilian government wishes to be recognized as "the leading maritime power in the Southern Hemisphere" and is seeking to develop a modern naval shipbuilding industry.

== See also ==
- Maritime geography
- Expeditionary warfare
- Power projection

== Footnotes ==
A. Professor of International Politics Adrian Hyde-Price highlights that in the post-Cold War era both Britain and France have re-focused their attention "towards expeditionary warfare and power projection. Power projection has always been an element of British and French military thinking given their residual overseas interests, but it has now moved centre stage."

B. Royal United Services Institute (Occasional Paper, September 2013): "As a permanent member of the UN Security Council, the independent ability to deploy a credible and powerful conventional force that enables access to most of the globe by sea is compelling. This force offers Britain the opportunity to commit political support in emerging crises to deter, prevent, coerce or – if necessary – destroy an aggressor, as envisaged in the UK's National Security Strategy (NSS)."

C. The Royal Navy does not typically use the term blue-water navy, but rather the term expeditionary. "The Navy is always expeditionary and is able to deal with threats to our nation's interest at range."
