= Type 32 frigate =

Planned British frigate

Class overview
- Name: Type 32 frigate
- Operators: Royal Navy
- Preceded by: Type 23 frigate
- In commission: Originally from the 2030s; project canceled 2026
- Planned: Up to 5
- Cancelled: All

General characteristics
- Type: General purpose frigate

The Type 32 frigate was a frigate being developed in the United Kingdom for the Royal Navy. It was officially announced in November 2020 by the Prime Minister Boris Johnson as a result of the Integrated Review. Built after the Type 26 and Type 31 frigates, the ship was to be general-purpose and modular in its design and, after entering service in the 2030s, had been expected to help grow the Royal Navy's surface escort fleet from 19 to 24 vessels. The project was formally cancelled in the 2026 Defence Investment Plan in favour of the planned Common Combat Vessel (CCV) and future drone vessels.

== Development ==
=== Announcement ===
The ship was first announced by Prime Minister Boris Johnson on 19 November 2020 as part of a defence investment pledge ahead of the Integrated Review. In addition to the long-known Type 26 and Type 31 frigates, the Prime Minister announced a new Type 32 frigate would be built. On 30 November 2020, the Ministry of Defence (United Kingdom) (MoD) stated that the concept phase for the vessel had not yet been launched but added that the ship was envisioned as a "platform for autonomous systems", used in roles such as anti-submarine warfare and mine countermeasures. Like the Type 31 frigate, the ship was to be general-purpose in its design. Up to five ships were planned, which, in combination with the planned five Type 31 frigates and eight Type 26 frigates, would have grown the Royal Navy's surface escort fleet from 19 to 24 vessels.

In March 2021, the government's defence command paper, Defence in a Competitive Age, elaborated further on the Type 32 frigate stating that it would be designed to protect territorial waters, to provide persistent presence and to support the Royal Navy's new Littoral Response Groups (LRGs). The document also stated that, along with the Type 31, the frigates would be more flexible than their predecessors, with a modular design, and equipped with advanced sensors and weapons. According to the document, the ships were likely to be built at Scottish shipyards, like the Type 26 and Type 31.

=== Concept phase / design contenders ===
In November 2021, the First Sea Lord, Tony Radakin, announced that the ship had entered its concept phase. He added that it was too early to define its characteristics but being a "Type 31 Batch 2" frigate could be an option. Radakin also reiterated the intent of the programme to provide "additional volume" to the fleet and embrace emerging technology. The revised National Shipbuilding Strategy, released in March 2022, suggested that the Type 32 frigates were likely to be "the first of a new generation of warships with a focus on hosting and operating autonomous onboard systems". Earlier comments by the Minister for Defence Procurement, Jeremy Quin, also suggested that the new Type 32 frigate will carry autonomous systems, adding to the Royal Navy's capabilities for missions such as anti-submarine warfare and mine countermeasures. Whilst the Type 32 is still in the concept phase, a number of designs have already been put forward to meet some of the suggested roles the vessels may undertake, especially in regard to operating offboard systems:

==== Adaptable Strike Frigate ====
BAE Systems revealed the Adaptable Strike Frigate (ASF) in 2022 and was developed from the growing interest towards offboard systems and modularity with the similar interests expressed in various UK defence documents and Royal Navy concepts. Described as mixture of a frigate and a cargo ship, the design has the aesthetic characteristics of the Type 26 frigate on the forward half of the vessel with gunnery systems (BAE/Bofors 57Mk3 and 40MK4), vertical launch systems (CAMM Mushroom Farms and Mark-41), laser directed energy weapon mounts (Dragonfire) and sensors; the aft half has a full-width space above deck for containers (Including mission modules), four large boat bays, hangar, UAV kennel, Chinook-capable flight deck and a large under-flight deck mission bay with a large stern ramp capable of deploying two 11 metre craft flanked by two small davits. The design is capable of holding 20 × twenty foot equivalent containers (TEU) and can manoeuvre such containers around the ship using SH Defence's CUBE system. The design has a length of 130 metres and displaces approximately 6,000 tonnes and costs before system integrations come to around £250–300 Million per ship. The current power arrangement is a combined diesel-electric and diesel-mechanical (CODED) arrangement, directly connected to a centre-line shaft and supported by two azipods which provide the ship's propulsion.

==== Arrowhead 140: Multi-Role Naval Platform / Type 31 Batch 2 ====
Babcock officially revealed the Multi-Role Naval Platform variant of their Arrowhead 140 design (same design as selected for the Type 31 frigates) for the Type 32 programme in 2023 (although it had previously been seen on AH140 marketing videos and on their website) The design features a stern boat ramp connected to the existing mission bay under the flight deck, a side hydraulic ramp, an enlarged hangar with capacity for up-to two Merlin AW101-sized helicopters which is directly connected to a full-width mission bay replacing the 32-cell vertical launch complex amidships and is capable of supporting 11-metre craft (e.g. USV, RHIBs) or TEU containers. Additionally, the B turret position forward of the bridge can be replaced with a 16-cell Mark-41 complex. Like the ASF, the MNP is also capable of embarking up-to a total of 20x TEU containers and is compatible with SH Defence's CUBE system for the movement of containers on board. By utilising the existing Arrowhead 140 design, commonality can be sought with the Type 31's to streamline training, upgrades, and upkeep. This design is also somewhat faithful to its heritage as the grandparent design of the AH140, the Absalon-class frigate (Parent design of the Iver Huitfeldt-class which is the parent design of AH140) which could be described as part frigate, part Ro-Ro vessel designed to support amphibious operations (albeit they are currently being upgraded to focus on anti-submarine warfare).

In an interview with The Telegraph, Babcock's corporate affairs chief John Howie discussed how they were looking at significantly reducing the number of crew onboard future warships like the Type 32, stating that "People talk about a Type 32 frigate – we like to refer to it as Type 31 batch two. We're doing a crew of about 105 on Type 31, so realistically we should be aiming to half that number for batch two."

=== Funding issues ===
In November 2022, the National Audit Office (NAO) reported that plans for the Type 32 frigate had been withdrawn by Navy Command due to concerns about unaffordability. Despite this, the MoD stated that the ships remained a key part of the future fleet. In January 2023, Defence Secretary of the United Kingdom Ben Wallace reported that the Type 32 frigate was still planned for implementation after "2030 or 2031", with further planning considerations to be addressed "between now and towards the centre of the decade." In 2023, the NAO's report on the MoD's Equipment Plan for 2023-2033 highlighted that new Royal Navy shipbuilding projects including the Type 32 frigate, Multi-Role Ocean Surveillance ships, Multi-Role Support Ships, Type 83 destroyers and associated Future Air Dominance System were £5.9 billion over existing budget. The project was formally cancelled in 2026 in favour of the future Common Combat Vessel (CCV) and future drone vessels, including the envisaged Type 91 "Missile Barge", Type 92 Sloop and Type 94 radar picket vessel.

== See also ==
- Future of the Royal Navy
- Type 31 frigate
- Type 26 frigate
- Type 83 destroyer
