= RFA Proteus =

Multi-Role Ocean Surveillance Ship (MROSS) of the Royal Fleet Auxiliary

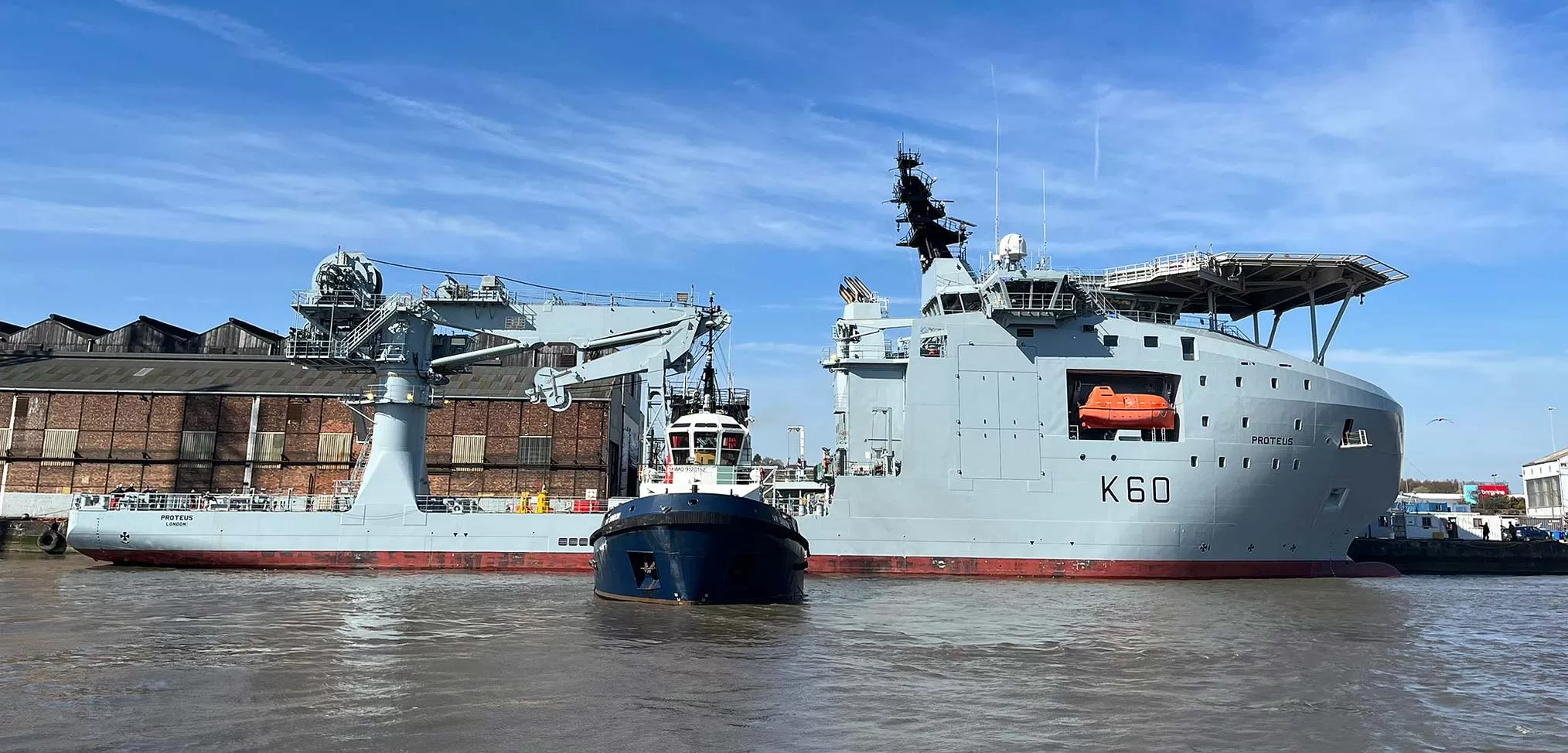
- Proteus at Cammell Laird

History

Marshall Islands
- Name: Topaz Tangaroa
- Owner: P&O Maritime Logistics
- Port of registry: Majuro
- Builder: Vard Brattvaag, Norway and Tulcea shipyard in Romania.
- Cost: $62 million
- Yard number: 841
- Launched: 18 March 2017
- Fate: Sold to Ministry of Defence, 14 February 2023

United Kingdom
- Name: Proteus
- Namesake: Proteus, a sea-god in Greek mythology
- Sponsored by: Akshata Murty
- Acquired: 14 February 2023
- In service: 10 October 2023
- Home port: Falmouth
- Identification: Pennant number : K60; IMO number: 9792539; MMSI number: 538008267
- Status: In active service
- Badge

General characteristics
- Class & type: VARD 3 08
- Type: Multi-role ocean surveillance ship
- Tonnage: 6,133 GT; 1,840 NT; 3,277 DWT
- Displacement: 6,000 t (5,900 long tons)
- Length: 98.1 m (321 ft 10 in)
- Beam: 20.048 m (65 ft 9.3 in)
- Draught: 6.0 m (19 ft 8 in)
- Propulsion: 2 × Caterpillar 3516C diesel engines (2 × 2,250 kW, 3,020 hp); 1 × Caterpillar 3512C diesel engine (1 × 1,700 kW, 2,300 hp); 2 × Caterpillar C32 diesel engines (2 × 1,820 kW, 2,440 hp); 2 × Kongsberg azimuth thrusters (2 × 1,650kW); 1 × bow thruster (1 × 1,500 kW, 2,000 hp)
- Speed: Max 14 knots (26 km/h; 16 mph)
- Complement: 82 as civil supply vessel; 24 RFA and 60 RN personnel in RFA service
- Aviation facilities: Helipad

RFA Proteus is a ship of the Royal Fleet Auxiliary within His Majesty's Naval Service of the United Kingdom. Its role is surveillance, acting as a platform for Remotely Operated Underwater Vehicles (ROUVs) and as a testbed for new specialist capabilities, required for monitoring waters important to UK interests. Acquired in 2023, the ship entered drydock at Cammell Laird for modification into a Multi-Role Ocean Surveillance Ship (MROSS). She formally entered service in October 2023.

The ship was formerly named MV Topaz Tangaroa in 2017–2022, and was used as a platform supply vessel operated by P&O Maritime Logistics. The vessel was refitted after being sold to the U.K. Ministry of Defence in January 2023.

Proteus is one of two new commercial vessels acquired for the Royal Fleet Auxiliary in 2023, the other being HMS Stirling Castle (M01); a mine hunting support ship to act as a mothership for autonomous minehunters.

== History ==
=== MV Topaz Tangaroa ===
The ship operated as the offshore support vessel MV Topaz Tangaroa for Topaz Marine (later, P&O Maritime Logistics) from December 2019 until January 2023. Designed and built by Vard Brattvaag, Norway and with the hull construction completed in Tulcea shipyard, Romania the primary capabilities of Topaz Tangaroa were to support subsea construction and installation projects, subsea inspection and survey, and as a mother ship to support remotely operated vehicle (ROV) operations. The ship was flagged in the Marshall Islands with its home port as Majuro.

Projects for which Topaz Tangaroa was deployed includes supporting the construction of the Greater Changhua offshore wind farm near Taiwan.

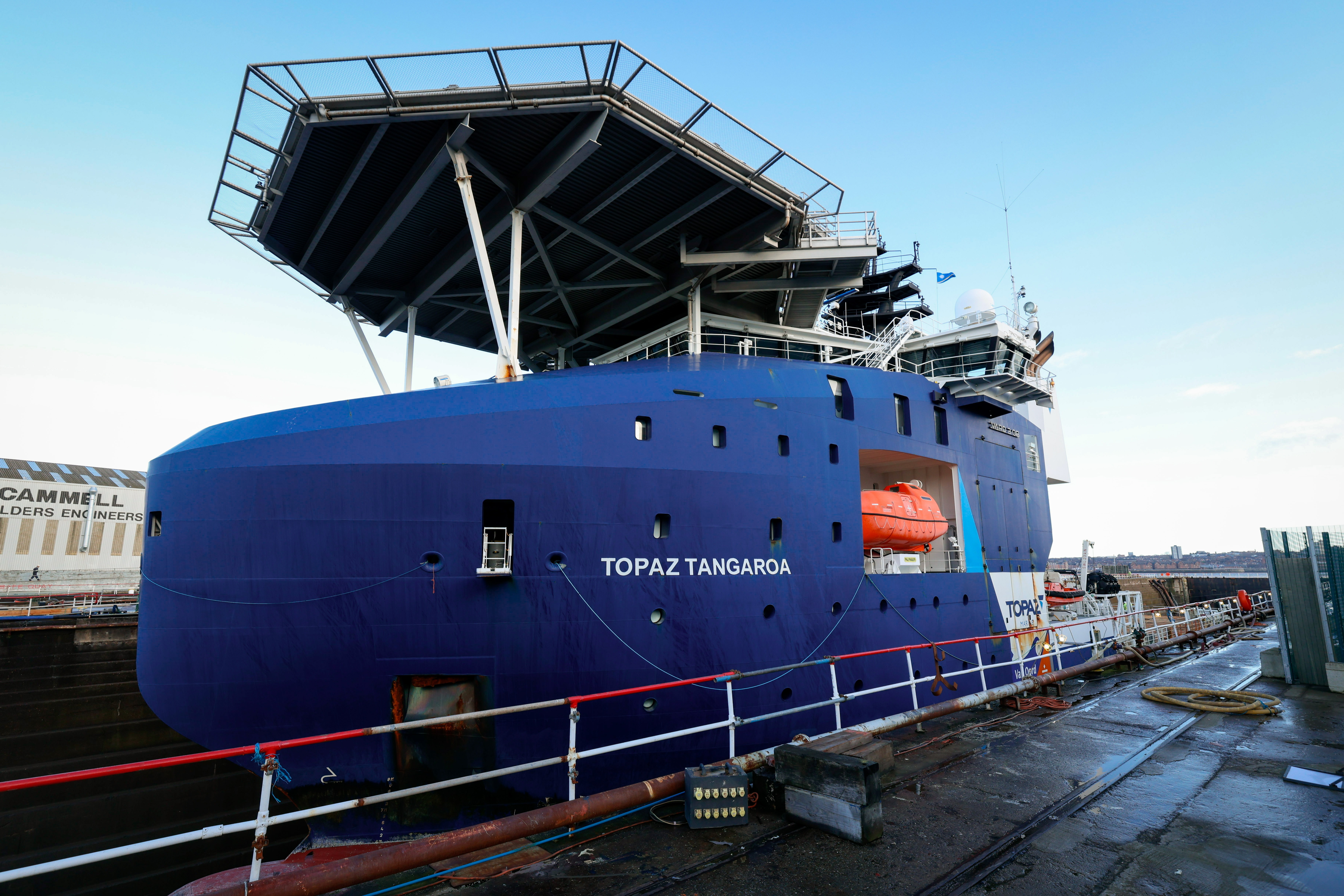
Proteus in dry-dock at Cammell Laird, Birkenhead in 2023, with its previous name Topaz Tangaroa

=== RFA Proteus ===
Owing to the UK's government's growing concern about protecting subsea infrastructure, and the 2022 Russian invasion of Ukraine, Topaz Tangaroa was purchased by the UK's Ministry of Defence in February 2023 for £70 million to be converted into a Multi-Role Ocean Surveillance Ship (MROSS) and operated by the Royal Fleet Auxiliary. The ship was assigned the pennant number K60. Initial conversion for naval service is being conducted at the Cammell Laird shipyard in Birkenhead, UK.

The MROSS was initially announced by the Defence Secretary Ben Wallace during the 2022 Conservative Party conference. Then-Prime Minister Boris Johnson had first discussed the possibility of such a vessel in November 2020.

She is equipped with a 120 tonnes (130 tons) crane as well as a hangar and workshops capable of accommodating remotely operated and other unmanned underwater vehicles (UUVs). The Ministry of Defence reportedly acquired three Kongsberg HUGIN Large UUVs which reportedly can conduct surveillance and surveys down to depths of 6,000 metres (20,000 ft).

Conversion of Proteus was completed in September 2023 and the ship began post-conversion sea trials. She formally entered service with the Royal Fleet Auxiliary in October 2023. A formal dedication ceremony took place in London on the River Thames, in the presence of the RFA Commodore-in-Chief, Prince Edward, Duke of Edinburgh, and Akshata Murty, wife of the incumbent Prime Minister Rishi Sunak, who will be the ship's sponsor throughout its active life, with Proteus berthed alongside the Imperial War Museum's preserved Town-class light cruiser, HMS Belfast.

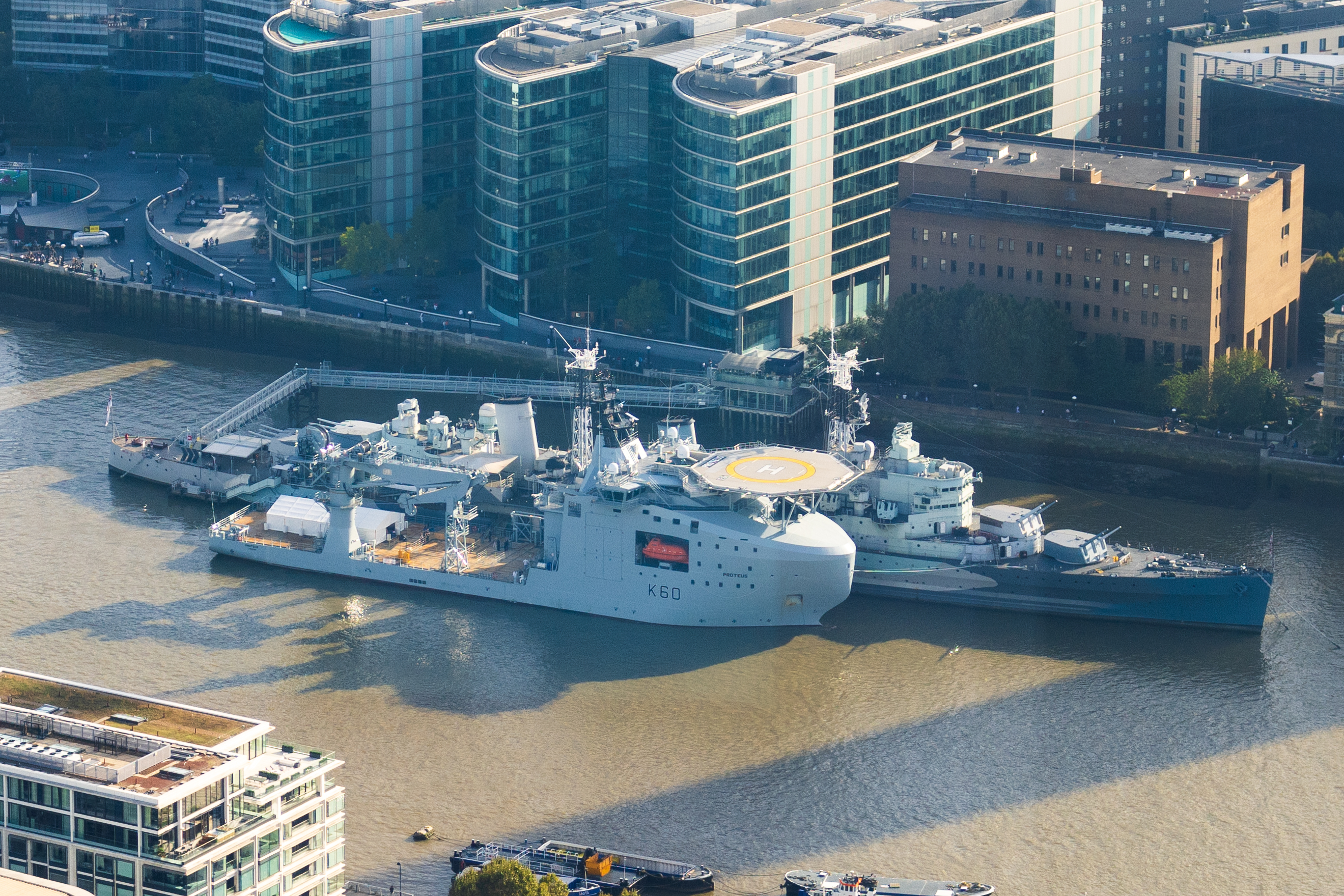
RFA Proteus and HMS Belfast from the Horizon 22 viewing gallery, 22 Bishopsgate, City of London, the day before the formal dedication ceremony.

== Design and facilities ==
RFA Proteus is a former offshore support vessel. Designed by Vard, the hull was constructed at their Tulcea shipyard in Romania and then fitted out at their Brattvåg facility in Norway, completed in 2019. Intended for work in the offshore oil industry its role was supporting relative construction, maintenance and inspection work and was already equipped to operate Autonomous Underwater Vehicles (AUVs).

The ship is capable of a top speed of 14 knots, but it has a typical cruising speed of 11 knots. It is equipped with 5 x Caterpillar diesel engines, these required to supply power for the ship, along with the stern azimuth thrusters, the twin bow tunnel thrusters and a drop-down azimuth bow thruster. It also has a Rolls-Royce Icon Dynamic Positioning system Class II, which enables the ship to remain stationary and includes an assigned operating control which overlooks the rear working deck. Proteus is designed with Antiroll tanks, including pumps capable of moving ballast water between them, which counters any horizontal motion.

The ship's accommodation comprises fifty-three cabins with eighty-two bunks, these are split across twenty-four single cabins and twenty-nine double cabins. A Royal Fleet Auxiliary crew of twenty-six will operate Proteus. This will be supplemented with approximately sixty Royal Navy specialists, who will be responsible for the undersea surveillance, survey and warfare systems operations. The ship is equipped with a single cafeteria but there are several mess and lounge spaces for crew relaxation.

The ship has a 7.2m^{2} opening moon pool enabling underwater vehicles to enter into or leave the water easily within a protected environment. This facility is located at the forward end of the working deck and the hatch cover is removed by crane. The AHC crane has a 3,000 metres (9,800 ft) long wire which enables objects to be directly lowered to the seabed. It has a safe working load of up to 120 tonnes (120 long tons; 130 short tons) and the working / cargo deck can carry loads totalling up to 1,400 tonnes (1,400 long tons; 1,500 short tons). The size of the working / cargo deck is 1,000m^{2} and Proteus is also equipped with a flight deck.

There is hangar space for Remotely Operated Vehicles (ROV)s, which runs across the ship for easy access between the port and starboard systems and the Launch and recovery system (LARS) can lower the underwater vehicles over either side. Proteus has an umbilical tether winch system, which carries the control, power and communications cables for equipment lowered, this comes from drums below decks and then up to the hangar, before connecting to the ROV through the LARS. Adjacent to the hangar are ROV workshops.

Proteus is fitted with a multibeam echosounder (MBES) giving the ship a hydrographic capability and it has a number of work spaces available which could be used for operations rooms.

== Career and Operations ==
As of December 2023, it was reported that Proteus was not yet available for operations having yet to complete Operational Sea Training and being still required to return to Cammell Laird shipyard in the new year for dry docking and inspections. Pursuant to the completion of work, Proteus reportedly sailed from Cammell Laird in March 2024 to resume her work-up. The ship visited London during the second weekend of May 2024. She was in Devonport Dockyard in Plymouth as of June 2024, and, as of October 2024, had been transferred to the Cammell Laird shipyard in Birkenhead. She departed Birkenhead in late October.

In November 2024 Britain's Ministry of Defence released a photograph of Proteus shadowing the Russian spy ship Yantar.

In June 2026, Proteus hosted trials of ScanFish, a containerised remotely operated towed vehicle developed for underwater surveying. During a two-week programme off Portland and in Lyme Bay, the vessel’s crew worked with specialists from the Royal Navy’s Hydrographic eXploitation Group to integrate the system with the ship, conduct launch and recovery drills, and collect seabed data. Equipped with oceanographic sensors, side-scan sonar, a sub-bottom profiler and optical and electro-optical cameras, ScanFish is capable of operating at depths of up to 1,000 metres (3,300 ft). The trials helped develop procedures for operating the system from Proteus, with the data collected due to be processed and submitted to the United Kingdom Hydrographic Office for assessment. Further deployments aboard Proteus and other Ministry of Defence vessels were planned ahead of its use in front-line operations.

== See also ==
- List of miscellaneous ships of the Royal Fleet Auxiliary
- Multi-Role Ocean Surveillance Ship
