= HMS Stirling Castle (M01) =

Mine Countermeasures Maritime Autonomous Systems ship of the Royal Navy

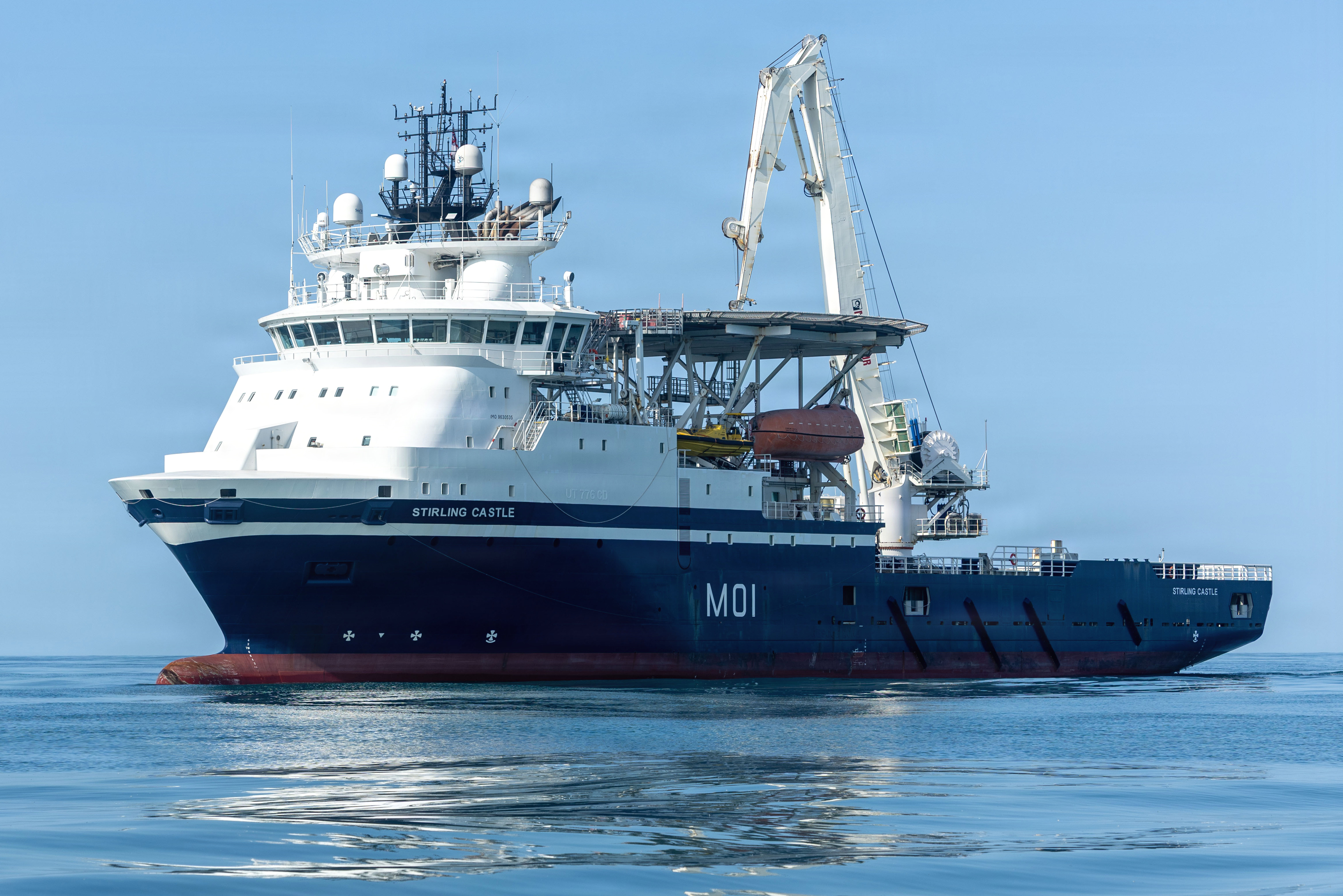
- Stirling Castle

History
- Name: Island Crown
- Owner: Island Offshore
- Port of registry: (The Bahamas) Nassau (2013–2017); (Norway) Ålesund (2017–2023)
- Builder: Vard Brăila, Romania
- Yard number: 784
- Laid down: 17 October 2011
- Launched: March 2013

United Kingdom
- Name: Stirling Castle
- Namesake: Stirling Castle
- Acquired: 14 February 2023
- In service: 11 April 2024 (in RFA service); 21 July 2025 (in RN service)
- Home port: HMNB Portsmouth (in RN service as of 2025)
- Identification: Pennant number: M01; IMO number: 9630535; MMSI number: 232047057
- Status: In active service
- Badge

General characteristics
- Class & type: VARD UT 776 CD
- Type: Mine Countermeasures Maritime Autonomous Systems (MCM MAS)
- Tonnage: 5,840 GT; 1,783 NT; 4,600 DWT
- Displacement: 6,000 tonnes
- Length: 96.8 m (317 ft 7 in)
- Beam: 20.0 m (65 ft 7 in)
- Draught: 6.0 m (19 ft 8 in)
- Propulsion: 4 × Bergen Engines C25:33L-6 diesel engines (4 × 2,000 kW, 2,700 hp); 2 × Kongsberg azimuth thrusters (2 × 3,500 kW, 4,700 hp); 3 × Kongsberg bow thrusters (3 × 1,882 kW, 2,524 hp)
- Complement: 100
- Aviation facilities: Helipad

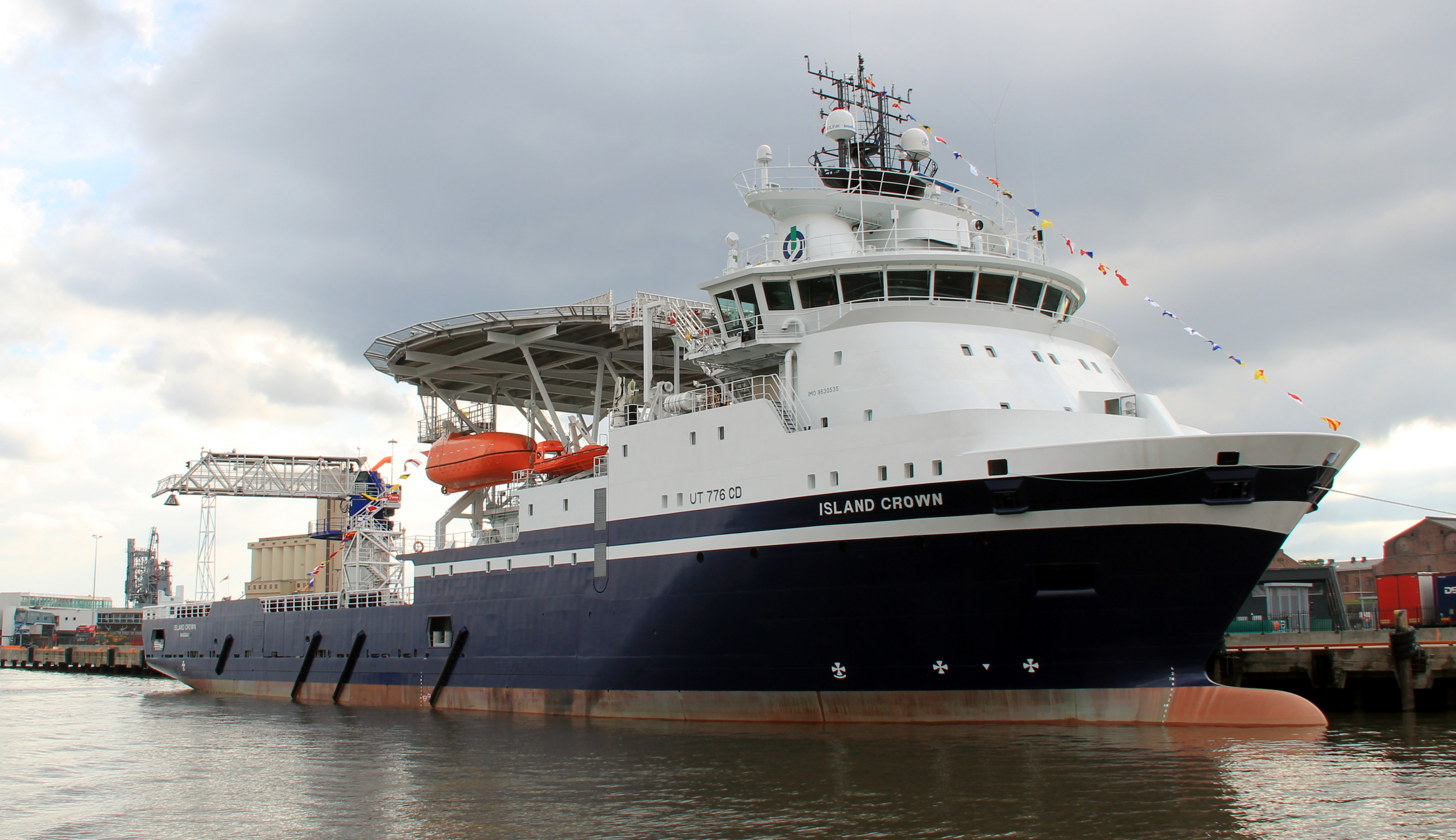
As Island Crown in Oslo, 2013

HMS Stirling Castle (formerly RFA Stirling Castle) is a ship of the Royal Navy. Originally acquired by the Royal Fleet Auxiliary (RFA), the ship was transferred to, and commissioned by, the Royal Navy in July 2025. After being acquired for the RFA in 2023, the ship entered drydock at HMNB Devonport, Plymouth for modification into a trials platform for autonomous minehunting systems that are to operate from a larger mother ship. The ship was formerly named Island Crown, and used as an offshore supply vessel operated by Island Offshore. The vessel was sold to the Ministry of Defence in January 2023 for £40 million.

Stirling Castle was one of two new commercial vessels acquired for the Royal Fleet Auxiliary in 2023, the other being RFA Proteus, a multi-role ocean surveillance ship to protect seabed infrastructure and communications. Originally, up to three additional ships performing the role of mine countermeasures command and support vessel were also planned for acquisition. These were to be either be converted former commercial vessels, similar to Stirling Castle, or new purpose-built ships, as reportedly preferred by the navy.

The 2026 DIP indicated that £90m will be invested in the autonomous minehunting programme "to procure offshore support vessels (OSVs) in conjunction with Norway". In November 2026, it was announced that, in conjunction with Norway, the navy would procure three P-1118 standardised vessels (with an option on three more) to act as mine hunting "motherships" for autonomous systems. The first vessels were envisaged for delivery in 2031.

== History ==
=== Island Crown ===
The ship operated as the offshore support vessel Island Crown for Island Offshore from March 2013 until July 2017 under the flag of the Bahamas and registered in Nassau. From July 2017 until March 2023 it sailed under the flag of Norway, registered in Ålesund. Designed by Rolls-Royce and built by Vard Brăila, Romania the primary capabilities of the Island Crown were to support subsea and offshore oil, gas, and renewable energy operations.

Projects for which the Island Crown was deployed includes supporting and accommodating workers on the construction of the East Anglia Array offshore wind farm near the United Kingdom.

=== Stirling Castle ===
Owing to the UK's government's growing concern about protecting subsea infrastructure, and the 2022 Russian invasion of Ukraine, the Island Crown was purchased by the Ministry of Defence in February 2023 to be converted into a platform for mine countermeasure operations, to be operated by the Royal Fleet Auxiliary and have pennant number M01. Initial conversion for naval service was conducted at HMNB Devonport. The primary focus of the Stirling Castle is as a trials platform to act as an offshore forward operating base, deploying Mine Countermeasures Maritime Autonomous Systems (MCM MAS), and drones to protect offshore subsea infrastructure. It will also be used as a platform for training RFA personnel on MCM MAS operations. For the employment of unmanned systems, the ship incorporates a crane with a safe working load of 10 tonnes at a 34m radius and 5 tonnes at a 40m radius. The ship's conversion was said to have been completed in May 2023 and she began sea trials prior to assuming her new role.

In July 2023, the ship conducted its first trials with three of the navy's autonomous vessels: Royal Navy motor boats Apollo, Hydra and Hazard. In December it was reported that the ship has been engaged in few activities since those initial trials. Her formal naming ceremony was delayed until Spring 2024 with reports suggesting that she might have to undergo docking in order to correct certain defects. However, from January to March 2024 Stirling Castle was reported to have undertaken additional operational sea training in preparation for work with the Mine and Threat Exploitation Group at the Clyde naval base. In April 2024, in a ceremony attended by Prince Edward, Duke of Edinburgh, the ship formally entered service with the RFA.

In August 2024 it was revealed that the ship's crane was damaged and therefore was unable to launch or recover boats. This rendered it ineffective in its main role.

While the crane defect was reported to have been repaired by October, a serious workforce shortage in the RFA meant that the ship remained effectively inactive. She was reportedly temporarily replaced in the MCM command and support role by the Marine Services vessel Northern River.

=== HMS Stirling Castle ===
In May 2025, it was announced that Stirling Castle would be transferred to the Royal Navy due to personnel shortages in the Royal Fleet Auxiliary. She was commissioned in the Royal Navy on 21 July 2025 and is based at HMNB Portsmouth.

In May 2026, the ship was reported to have transitted to Gibraltar to deliver the autonomous vessels RNMB Ariadne and RNMB Halcyon, along with other equipment, to RFA Lyme Bay, which was being prepared also to operate autonomous vessels.

== See also ==
- List of miscellaneous ships of the Royal Fleet Auxiliary
