= Integrated Review =

2019–21 defence policy review in UK

The Integrated Review of Security, Defence, Development and Foreign Policy, often known as the Integrated Review, and titled as Global Britain in a Competitive Age, was a review carried out by the British government led by Boris Johnson into the foreign, defence, security and international development policies of the United Kingdom. Described by Johnson as "the largest review of its kind since the Cold War", the review was published on 16 March 2021.

The Integrated Review sets out the government's vision for Global Britain, the UK's role in the world following its withdrawal from the European Union. Its four overarching objectives are for the UK to sustain a strategic advantage through science and technology, for the UK to shape the open international order through working with partners and international institutions, for the UK to strengthen its security at home and abroad and for the UK to become more resilient to threats at home and overseas. The review identified Russia as an "acute threat", China a "systemic challenge" and climate change the UK's highest international priority. It was first announced in December 2019 by the first Johnson ministry with a publication date set for "early 2020"; however, the COVID-19 pandemic caused it to be delayed several times. A number of preliminary decisions were published in November 2020 ahead of the review's full publication.

A defence command paper, titled Defence in a Competitive Age, was published by the Ministry of Defence on 22 March 2021 which outlined changes to the armed forces in order to meet the objectives of the Integrated Review.

Johnson's successor, Liz Truss initiated an update of the Integrated Review due to evolving threats, particularly Russia following its invasion of Ukraine. This was concluded by Rishi Sunak's government; the Integrated Review Refresh 2023, was published on 13 March 2023.

== Background ==
The review was first announced during the December 2019 State Opening of Parliament in a speech outlining the second Johnson ministry's plans for that parliamentary year.

The Integrated Review combines previously separate reviews into foreign policy, defence, national security and international development, such as the National Security Strategy and the Strategic Defence and Security Review into one, making it the largest review of its kind carried out by a UK government since the Cold War. It follows several notable developments since previous reviews, namely the United Kingdom's withdrawal from the European Union, the start of the COVID-19 pandemic and consequent economic downturn, the 2019–2020 Persian Gulf crisis, the rise in space warfare, several terrorist attacks and the use of hybrid warfare, particularly by Russia and China. The review also follows the merging of the Foreign and Commonwealth Office and Department for International Development into the Foreign, Commonwealth and Development Office which occurred in September 2020.

Prime Minister Boris Johnson claimed it was "the biggest review of our foreign, defence, security and development policy since the end of the Cold War."

== Overview ==
=== Objectives ===
In a statement in September 2020, Prime Minister Boris Johnson confirmed the Integrated Review would be underpinned by a commitment to spend at least 2% of GDP on defence—as defined as a target by NATO, 0.7% of GNI on Official development assistance and the maintenance of the British nuclear deterrent. The Prime Minister summarised the review's objectives as follows:

- To define the United Kingdom's role in the world, as well as its long-term strategic aims for national security and foreign policy.
- To set out how the UK will be a "problem-solving" and "burden-sharing" nation, working more effectively with its allies.
- To determine the capabilities required for the next decade and beyond to pursue the UK's objectives and address the risks and threats it faces.
- To address reforms to Government systems and structures to achieve these goals.
- To outline the implementation for these goals and how it will be evaluated.

In September 2020, Defence Secretary Ben Wallace explained that the review would deliver an armed forces that was "fit for tomorrow's battles" by switching from "traditional warfighting" to "technological warfighting". He explained that this would entail being forward deployed — for example, in Europe to deter Russian activity, in the Middle East to combat terrorism or in the Asia-Pacific to counter China — and relying on technology to deliver "speed, readiness and resilience" instead of "mass and mobilisation", including in the domains of space, cyberspace and sub-sea.

=== Complications ===
The review suffered several delays due to the COVID-19 pandemic, causing it to miss its original publication date of "early 2020". The review was first postponed in April 2020 but was restarted in July of that same year, with an unspecified publication date. A call for evidence was published on 13 August 2020 by the Cabinet Office. In October 2020, the review's future came into question once again following a decision by the government to implement a separate spending review, which covered one year instead of three, due to the economic uncertainty caused by the COVID-19 pandemic. A new publication date for February 2021 was then set but was subsequently missed, due again to the pandemic. This date was then replaced by one during March.

=== Decisions ===
In November 2020, Johnson announced an investment of £16.5 billion into defence over four years — representing a share of over 2.2% of GDP — as the first conclusion of the Integrated Review. Reported as the "largest military investment in 30 years", Johnson stated: "This is our chance to end the era of retreat, transform our Armed Forces, bolster our global influence, unite and level up our country, pioneer new technology and defend our people and way of life". The investment amounts to an increase of between 10–15 percent on the current annual budget of £41.5 billion.

The full review, titled Global Britain in a Competitive Age, was published on 16 March 2021 by the Cabinet Office. It resulted in the following notable conclusions:

==== Defence ====
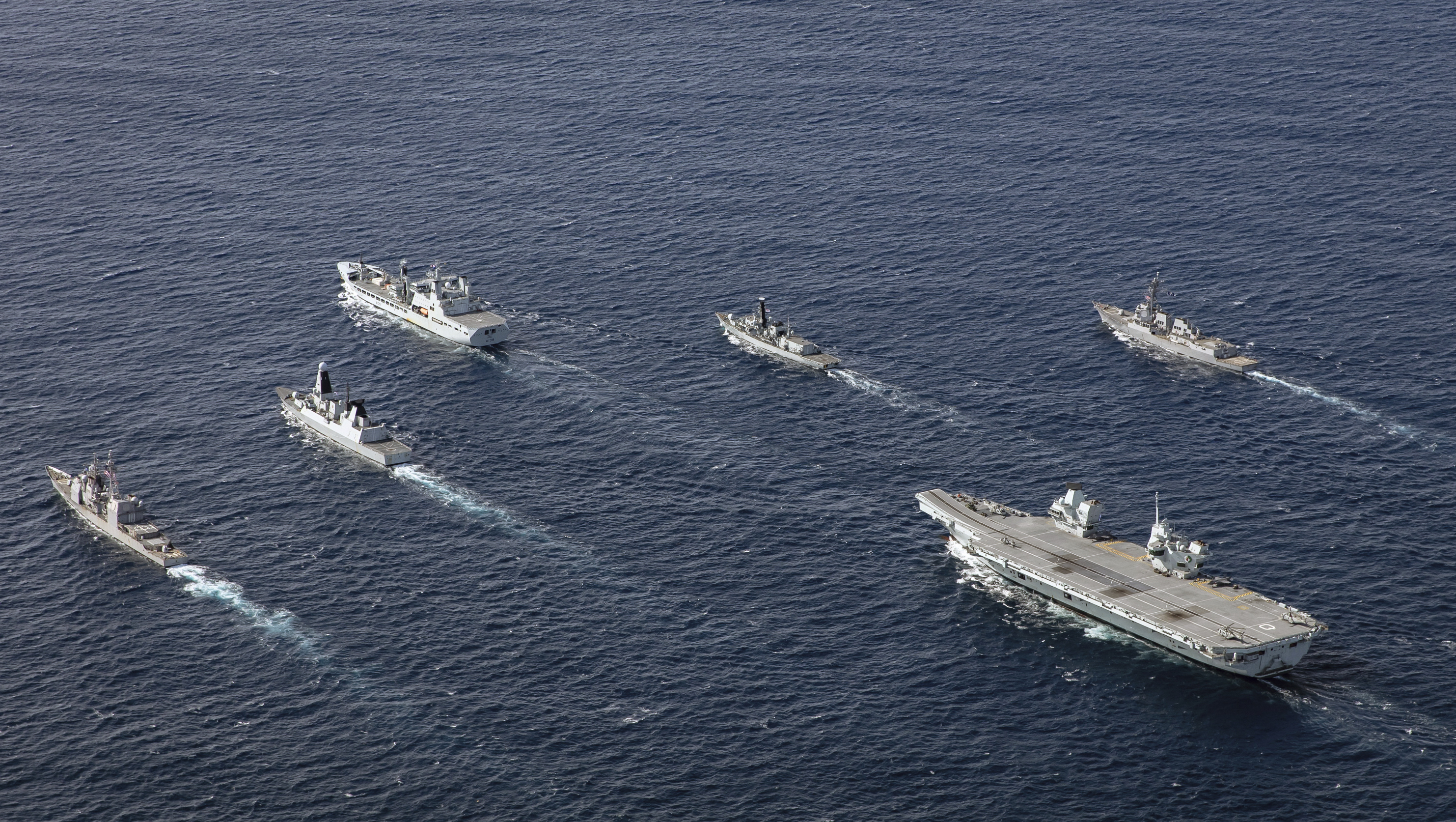
The UK Carrier Strike Group during an exercise in 2019. The review outlined the government's plans to maintain two aircraft carriers, with one carrier strike group permanently available for operations.

- The government announced its intention for the UK to be restored as the "foremost naval power in Europe" through the introduction of eight Type 26 frigates, five Type 31 frigates, support ships for the Queen Elizabeth-class aircraft carriers, a new Multi-Role Ocean Surveillance Ship and a new class of frigate, the Type 32 frigate.
- Two aircraft carriers must be maintained, with one carrier strike group permanently available and routinely deployed alongside NATO and other allies.
- The Trident nuclear deterrent must be renewed. The cap on the UK's stockpile of nuclear warheads must rise from 180 warheads to around 260 — the first time it has risen since the Cold War.
- A new United Kingdom Space Command must be formed as part of the Royal Air Force to launch British satellites and, in 2022, the first rocket from Scotland. (The first commander was announced as Air Commodore Paul Godfrey in February 2021.)
- A new fighter system which harnesses artificial intelligence and drone technology must be introduced as part of the Future Combat Air System.
- £1.5 billion must be invested into military research and development.
- Directed energy weapons must equip warships and combat vehicles.
- A new centre dedicated to artificial intelligence to be established.
- A new National Cyber Force and Counter Terrorism Operations Centre must be formed to counter terrorism, organised crime and hostile state activity.
- The UK must remain a nuclear-armed power with global reach and integrated military capabilities across all five operational domains.

==== Foreign policy ====
- A constructive and productive relationship must be maintained with the European Union based on a mutual respect for sovereignty.
- The United States must remain the UK's most important bilateral relationship and strategic ally.
- Russia remains the most active threat to UK security, whilst North Korea and Iran represent growing threats.
- A positive trade and investment relationship must be maintained with China whilst addressing the "systemic challenge" it represents to UK security.
- The UK must be active in Africa (in particular East Africa and with Nigeria), the Middle East and the Persian Gulf for trade, green innovation and to make them more resilient regions which are self-reliant for their own security.
- The UK must continue to be a leading member in NATO — the leading European member — committed to the collective security of the Euro-Atlantic region.
- By 2030, the UK must be "deeply engaged" in the Indo-Pacific region with a larger, more persistent presence than any other European country.
- The UK must strengthen its foreign policy cooperation with the Five Eyes member states.

==== Other ====
- A commitment of 0.7% of gross national income (GNI) on development must be reinstated when the "fiscal situation allows".
- A new Situation Centre to be established to address future crisis'.
- The UK must become a "science and tech superpower" by 2030 through the redoubling of research and development, bolstering innovation partnerships, and improving national skills – including by attracting the world's "best and brightest" to the UK through a new Global Talent Visa.
- Tackling climate change and biodiversity loss is to be the government's highest international priority.
- The UK must become one of the world's leading democratic cyber powers.

=== Reaction ===
Jeremy Farrar, director of the health research foundation Wellcome, praised the review's ambitions for the UK to become a "science superpower", however he warned that these ambitions were at risk of being damaged by government cuts to research and development. Jack Watling of the Royal United Services Institute stated that the review had "much to commend", due to its well-evidenced judgments and accurate descriptions of the UK's interests but added that it was "fundamentally incomplete". In an article published by Chatham House, Baroness Joyce Anelay, Chair of the House of Lords International Relations & Defence Select Committee, stated that the Integrated Review over-promised and under-delivered.

The Integrated Review received criticism for its lack of focus on European security, particularly following the 2022 Russian invasion of Ukraine. Several MPs and ex-military chiefs demanded a reversal of some of the decisions made in the Integrated Review to help the UK counter Russia. Conversely, some argued that the conflict reinforced the conclusions of the review. Leader of the Opposition Sir Keir Starmer also accused the Prime Minister of breaking an election pledge to not cut the number of British Army personnel. Foreign policy experts and MPs were also critical of the Integrated Review following the 2021 Taliban offensive which exposed a weakness in the review's dependence on the United States.

== Defence in a Competitive Age ==
Following the publication of the Integrated Review, the government published a defence command paper, titled Defence in a Competitive Age on 22 March 2021. The document outlined the government's planned investments and savings to defence to allow it to meet the objectives set out in the Integrated Review.

== Revision ==
Over a year since its original publication, in September 2022, the newly-incumbent Prime Minister Liz Truss announced that the Integrated Review would be updated to ensure it is "keeping pace" with evolving threats posted by hostile nations, especially Russia in the wake of its invasion of Ukraine. This update was also expected to be backed by a promised rise in defence spending, accounting for 3% of GDP by 2030. However, Truss' successor, Prime Minister Rishi Sunak, who took office that October, refused to confirm he would uphold this promise due to economic uncertainty. Irrespective of this, Sunak remained committed to updating the Integrated Review.

On 13 March 2023, Integrated Review Refresh 2023 was published by the British government. In a statement to Parliament, Foreign Secretary James Cleverly stated that the previous review's overall analysis and strategic ambition was correct and on track, however he added that global turbulent events in 2021 had progressed far more than previously thought; a likely reference to the War in Ukraine. He also stressed that China remained a challenge due to the increasingly aggressive military and economic behaviour of the Chinese Communist Party, especially towards Taiwan and Lithuania.

A pledge to invest a further £5 billion into defence was made; £3 billion of which for the MOD's nuclear enterprise, such as industrial infrastructure and support for in-service submarines. £1.9 billion is to replenish stockpiles to replace donations sent to Ukraine and £50 million is to support wider government security programmes. An additional £6 billion investment was announced as part of the 2023 budget for a total investment of £11 billion to be made over the next five years. The government stated its ambition was to raise defence spending from 2.2% to 2.5% of GDP "once fiscal and economic conditions allow". On 23 April 2024, Prime Minister Sunak confirmed the UK would increase its defence spending to 2.5% of GDP by 2030.

On 16 July 2024, following their election victory in the 2024 general election, the newly elected Labour government of Keir Starmer announced the commencement of a new defence review. The Strategic Defence Review is due to be released in the first half of 2025.

== See also ==
- AUKUS
- National Security Strategy (United Kingdom)
- Strategic Defence and Security Review 2015
