= Type 83 destroyer =

Planned British guided-missile destroyer class

Class overview
- Name: Type 83 destroyer
- Operators: Royal Navy
- Preceded by: Type 45
- Planned: 6 to 8 ships
- Canceled: All

General characteristics (conceptual)
- Type: Guided-missile destroyer

The Type 83 destroyer was a proposed concept of a guided-missile destroyer envisaged to enter service with the United Kingdom's Royal Navy in the late 2030s. It was being assessed as a direct replacement for the Type 45 class. In June 2026 it was revealed that the class had been cancelled in favour of a new Common Combat Vessel intended to enter service in the early 2030s.

== Background ==
In 2026, the Royal Navy had six Type 45-class destroyers, also known as the Daring class, the first of which entered service in 2009. They were planned to leave service by 2038. They are used principally for anti-air warfare (AAW) and are equipped with the Sea Viper air defence system. Sea Viper comprises the SAMPSON multi-function AESA radar and a 48-cell Sylver Vertical Launching System (VLS) for the ship's primary anti-air armament, the short range Aster 15 (to be replaced by Sea Ceptor with the addition of 24 vertical launch cells) and long range Aster 30 missiles. Outside their primary AAW role, the Type 45s have flag-facilities to lead a task-force and are also periodically deployed to carry out counter-piracy, counter-drug trafficking, maritime security and humanitarian assistance/disaster relief missions.

In 2023 General Nick Carter, the former head of the British Armed Forces, described the Type 45 destroyers as the UK's only credible means of protection against large scale cruise missile attacks as well as ballistic missile and hypersonic missile threats, contextualised with the usage of Russian missile strikes during the Russo-Ukrainian War following the 2022 Invasion. This is because the Type 45s are the only asset in UK service to have both wide-area air-defence capability beyond 100 kilometres (55 nautical miles) via the Aster 30 missile and ballistic missile defence capability with the forthcoming Aster 30 Block 1 variant (following completion of upgrades to the Type 45s). By comparison, the Royal Navy's Type 23 frigates as well as the forthcoming Type 26 and Type 31 frigates alongside the Sky Sabre air defence system in British Army service are, at least initially, only [to be] equipped with the >25 km (15 nmi) point and local-area defence 'Sea Ceptor / Land Ceptor' variant of the CAMM family respectively.

The first public mention of a new anti-air warfare fleet escort for the Royal Navy was in the British Ministry of Defence's (MoD) command paper, Defence in a Competitive Age, published in March 2021. It was mentioned again the same year in the context of the government's National Shipbuilding Strategy and associated comments regarding planned investments in future naval platforms. According to The National Interest, if previous Royal Navy conventions are adhered to, the "8X" designation suggests the ship will be a large, multi-role fleet escort, akin to the sole Type 82 destroyer, HMS Bristol (in commission from 1973 to 1991). The latter was a large, multi-role destroyer with dimensions approaching those of a World War II light cruiser, designed and built to escort the Royal Navy's aborted CVA-01 class of fleet aircraft carrier. She was equipped with flag facilities for this purpose as well as a comprehensive suite of state-of-the-art anti-air, anti-submarine and anti-surface weapons and sensors.

== Development ==
=== Future Air Dominance System (FADS) ===
Currently, the MoD and Royal Navy are in the conceptual phase for the development of a wider joint system known as the Future Air Dominance System (FADS) as means of replacing the Type 45s. AT DSEI 2023, First Sea Lord Sir Ben Key described FADS as "...the replacement to our Type 45 Destroyer, but so much more than just about ships. A system of systems designed to be completely dominant. Dominant in air defence, dominant in long range precision strike, blending existing ships and aircraft with cutting edge sensors, weapons, digital enablement, to ensure that we can do what we need to do faster, accurately and more lethally than those who would oppose us".

FADS is expected to take a system of systems approach to the future of maritime air defence and surface warfare; with the Type 83s working in concert with other allied (NATO) vessels, the carrier air wing on board the Queen Elizabeth-class aircraft carriers (F-35Bs), as well as other land, air, and space-based assets to defeat hostile aircraft and uncrewed air vehicles as well as conventional, ballistic, and hypersonic missile threats. In February 2022, the MoD confirmed the Type 83s would be equipped to address the burgeoning threat of hypersonic missiles. Alongside this, FADS also intends to develop new methods of both the initial procurement of equipment and through-life upgrades.

=== Early design concepts ===
Less than £7 million was spent on developing the Type 83 concept before cancellation, when it was in an early concept stage.

No design specifics had been confirmed publicly. Of the many that were under consideration, a number had been publicly shown or described:

==== 'Cruiser' solution ====
In June 2023, 3D renderings of a computer model purported to be an indicative 'place-saver' for the Type 83 project, were published by online defence news outlet 'DefenceConnect'. The article's author claimed the image had been sourced from an internal BAE Systems presentation titled, "Fire Safety and Damage Control in Warship Design - Now and into the future" and was preliminary. It does however show a large vessel, appearing to take strong design cues from both the previous Type 45 class and particularly the Type 26 class of vessels whilst evidently following a standard warship design philosophy. It is displayed with a single 5-inch (127 mm) gun forward, large batteries of vertical launch cells (possibly 96-cells or more) sited forward and amidships, several CIWS and laser/EOS mounts, a sizeable helipad aft and an adjoining hangar able to host up to Merlin-sized aircraft. The model is displayed with two funnels/uptakes and is topped by a mainmast mounting multiple fixed AESA radar panels similar in appearance to CEA Technologies' CEAFAR system; an additional panel appears present on the aft uptake whilst another is located amidships looking directly up. The presence of the CEAFAR corresponds with reports from 2018 that the UK had begun feasibility studies for the system to be applied to future British warships.

A new large cruiser style design would likely be an expensive option for the programme, but would seemingly be more than capable of meeting any expected specifications for the Type 83, with plenty of space and weight available for both a high-end sensor suite and a large missile capacity comparable to other foreign high-end air-warfare destroyer/cruiser designs such as the PLAN's Type 055 or the USN's upcoming DDG(X), both in 10,000+ tonne range.

==== Arsenal ship ====
In June 2023, Navy Lookout reported on a concept for an 'arsenal ship' design that appears to have originated from a Royal Navy presentation during a Navy Leaders 2022 presentation on FADS and the Type 83. This vessel would be around 4,000 tonnes, have a crew of fewer than 50, and feature both a high-end air-warfare sensor suite and large VLS capacity. The design would also aim to focus on survivability, with the crew centred in an heavily armoured habitable core and the outer compartments filled with inert gas, leaving damage control tasks to automated systems. However, it would not feature any anti-submarine capability or hangar facilities, and only a light gunnery armament for force protection.

A potential benefit of such an approach would be that the lower crewing requirements and reduced sustainment costs could allow for three to four times the number of hulls to be procured over the six Type 45s, allowing for a much greater distribution of air-defence assets around a carrier strike group. Another benefit would be having additional ships available for alternate deployments such as mainland defence. However, at the cost of complete specialisation towards air-defence, it would lack much of the command and other peacetime capabilities found in its predecessor. A proposal would see these arsenal ships augment the Type 83s and be termed Type 91. At the 2025 CNE conference in Farnborough, a Royal Navy Commodore stated the Type 91 was in the pre-concept phase. Type 91 survived review in the 2026 Defence Investment Plan (DIP) and, as of 2026, was still moving forward.

==== Global Combat Ship (air-warfare variant) ====
An air-warfare variant of the Type 26 was reported as being under consideration for the Type 83 programme in March 2021; however, at the time, there was no indication that a Type 26-derived design was capable of carrying the 90+ VLS cells that was viewed as competitive to the missile capacity of foreign equivalent designs (e.g. DDG(X) / Type 55). In November 2023, BAE showcased a guided-missile variant of the Hunter-class frigates (Australian version of the Type 26 design) which removed the flexible mission space (mission bay) as well as a number of acoustic hygiene and anti-submarine warfare features to facilitate the addition of 64 vertical launch cells on top of the existing 32-cell complex for a total of 96 cells, with the option of removing the main gun to allow for a total of 128 cells.

Using an existing hull design for the Type 83 could have potentially reduced the development costs of the overall programme compared to developing a new design from scratch; commonality of equipment with the ASW variant would also have assisted in this aim and could have permitted a more streamlined construction schedule assuming the Type 83 would have been built at BAE's shipyard on the Clyde following on from the build of last two Type 26 vessels in the 2030s.

==== Planned characteristics ====
The planned characteristics of the Type 83 were:

- Multiple Mark 41 vertical launching system with a capacity of between 72 and 128 Integrated Air and Missile Defence and Strike (IAMD) and long-range strike effectors (with provisions to fit two Advanced Payload Modules for future hypersonic missiles in lieu of Mk 41 modules)
- 57mm medium calibre gun for maritime interdiction
- Counter-FIAC and self-defence against surface and air threats
- An integrated mast hosting multi-band, multi-mode sense capabilities (fixed-face active electronically scanned array radar, radar-band and communication-band electronic support measures and electro-optical/infrared sensors)
- Directed energy weapons (DEW) for counter-UAS defence
- Trainable launchers for soft-kill decoys
- An open architecture ‘app-based’ combat management system enabling rapid updates and embodying Artificial Intelligence/Machine Learning (AI/ML)-based Force Threat Evaluation and Weapon Assignment (FTEWA) functionality
- Force-wide connectivity via the StrikeNet resilient mesh network
- High levels of platform automation to reduce crew complement
- A power management and propulsion system able to support high levels of dynamic demand from high-power radars and DEW.

== See also ==
- Future of the Royal Navy
- DDG(X)
- DDX (Italy)
- KDDX-class destroyer
- Project 18-class destroyer
- Type 055 destroyer
- Type F127 frigate
- Aegis system equipped vessels (ASEV)
