= Multi-Role Ocean Surveillance Ship =

Research and surveillance ship for the Royal Fleet Auxiliary

The Multi-Role Ocean Surveillance Ship (MROSS) is a type of research and surveillance ship that had been in development since 2021 for the United Kingdom's Royal Fleet Auxiliary. The first ship, RFA Proteus, is a commercial ship converted to the role which entered service in October 2023. The second ship was planned, potentially as a new build vessel. Both ships were envisaged for use by the RFA to research and protect critical undersea national infrastructure, such as undersea cables and gas pipelines, in both British and international waters.

However, the 2026 Defence Investment Plan (DIP) made no mention of such a vessel and instead simply referred to the investment of £330m over four years on "critical underwater infrastructure protection, including through enhanced capabilities for RFA PROTEUS". The DIP also indicated that the Government would "explore where we can partner with industry to bring more funding into underwater cable protection". This made the future acquisition of any additional vessel uncertain.

== Background ==
With around 380 in use across the world, undersea cables play a key role in the global economy by carrying trillions of dollars' worth in financial transfers and transmitting 97% of the world's global communications. The UK, like most countries, is heavily reliant on undersea cables for its telecommunications and so considers them part of its critical national infrastructure. Due to their importance, they represent a potential high value target of hostile state interference and sabotage. In 2015, the Russian Navy commissioned Yantar, a research vessel which has since been sighted in the vicinity of undersea cables with an alleged capability to tamper with them. In December 2017, UK Chief of Defence Staff Sir Stuart Peach warned that Russia's modernised navy and increased submarine activity in the Atlantic Ocean could pose a significant threat to the UK's undersea cables. He warned that Russia could strike a "catastrophic" blow to the country's economy by cutting, disrupting or wire-tapping its undersea cables.

In 2021, the UK government published the Integrated Review, a foreign, defence, security and international development policy review, which declared that the ocean was facing pressures caused by climate change and environmental degradation, as well as growing tensions around maritime choke points, migration and piracy. This, it stated, negatively impacted livelihoods around the world and impacted the ocean's biological and mineral resources.

MROSS will not be the first vessels used by the Naval Service for research and surveillance. In the early 2020s, the Royal Navy's Hydrographic Squadron consisted of five ships: subsea support/ice patrol vessel HMS Protector, inshore and coastal survey vessel HMS Magpie, ocean survey vessel HMS Scott and two Echo-class survey ships: name ship HMS Echo and sister ship HMS Enterprise. In the past, the Royal Navy also operated HMS Challenger, a specialist diving vessel which was commissioned in 1983 and which took part in clandestine deep diving operations at the end of the Cold War. However, she was decommissioned in 1990. HMS Echo decommissioned in 2022 and the withdrawal of HMS Enterprise took place in March 2023. While HMS Scott is reported as likely to be extended in service until 2033, a capability gap for the period thereafter remained.

== Development ==
The Multi-Role Ocean Surveillance Ship programme was first publicly announced as part of the UK Government's March 2021 Integrated Review. It stated that a singular ship would be procured to help deliver a government commitment to protecting the UK's critical national infrastructure and help further its knowledge of the maritime environment. It was also a part of a 30-year National Shipbuilding Strategy and likely to be built in Scotland.

By October 2021, the first ship had entered the concept and assessment phase. In October 2022, amid suspected Russian sabotage of the Nord Stream pipeline, the UK's Secretary of State for Defence, Ben Wallace, announced that two MROSS ships would be procured. The first ship would be procured as a ready-built commercial vessel and converted, ready for service in 2023. The second vessel had been envisaged as possibly a vessel to be purpose-built in the UK. In November 2022, the Ministry of Defence announced that the programme would be accelerated using funds gained through the cancellation of the National Flagship, a vessel which was to be used by the monarch and government officials to promote UK interests abroad. However, these funds may since have been redirected elsewhere, including into the DIP's envisaged "critical underwater infrastructure protection" plans.

In January 2023, the first vessel — MV Topaz Tangaroa — was acquired and entered service as RFA Proteus. She was purchased for £70 million (US$95.89 million) and was converted to act as a mothership for autonomous systems and have military communications and light defensive armament added. Conversion work was carried out at Cammell Laird's facility in Birkenhead, England and the vessel entered service in October 2023.

== Characteristics ==
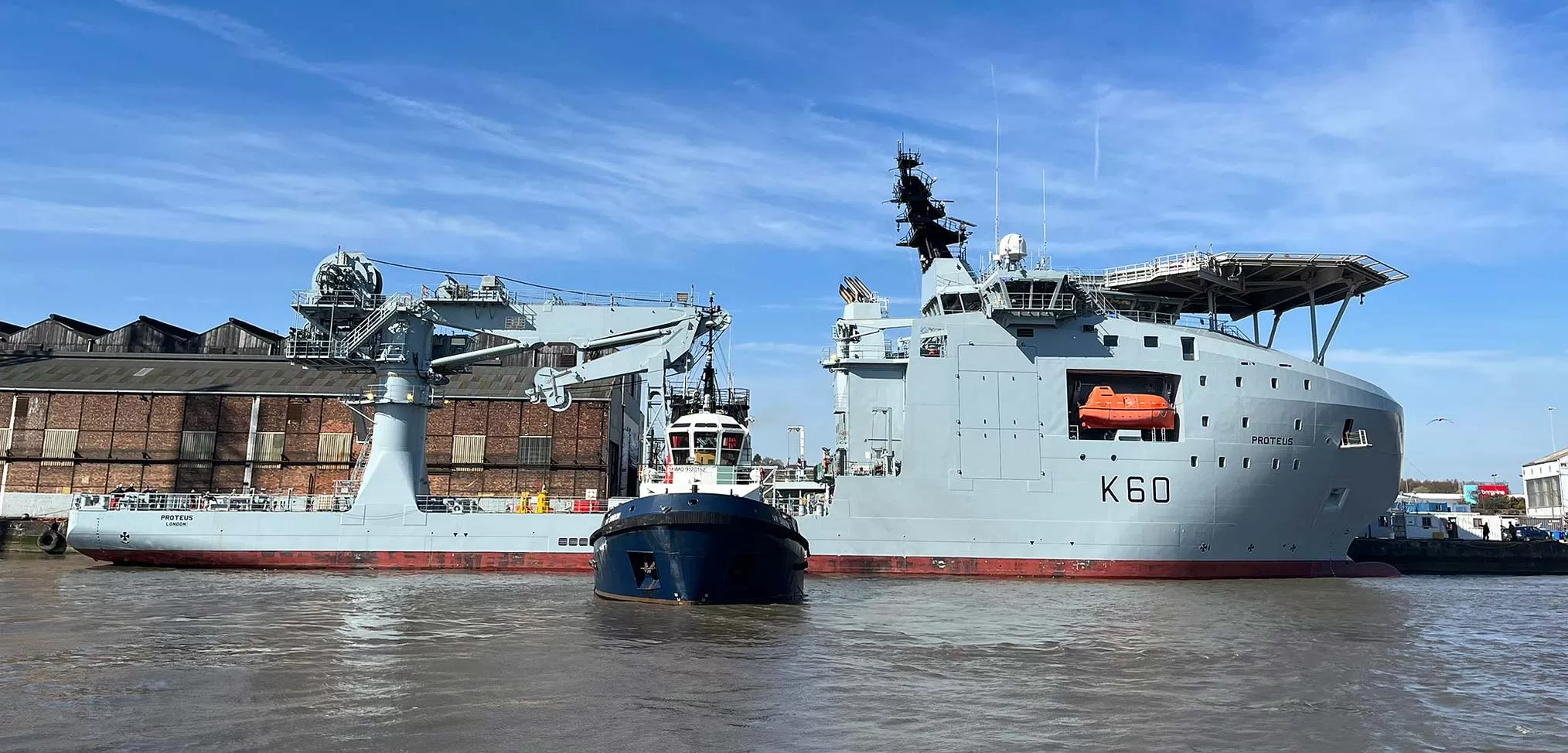
Proteus

The first MROSS vessel, RFA Proteus, is a ready-built commercial vessel which has undergone conversion. Service entry for the second purpose-built vessel had been anticipated in the early 2030s.

Proteus was built in Norway in 2019 and is equipped to operate autonomous submersibles. She has diesel-electric propulsion with powerful twin bow thrusters to "hold a precise stationary position when working over subsea installations". She is also equipped with a moon pool, permitting a sheltered way for robot submersibles to be launched or recovered in high sea states. The ship is 98.1 metres (321 ft 10 in) long with a flight deck, heavy duty crane and 1,000 square metres (11,000 sq ft) of cargo space. She has a displacement of 6,000 tonnes (5,900 long tons) and is crewed by around two dozen RFA sailors and up to 60 Royal Navy specialists.

While Proteus is primarily tasked with survey duties and the protection of the UK's undersea cables and energy supplies, she is also be capable of supporting other defence tasks, such as exercises and operations in the Arctic Ocean.
