= Angus (given name) =

- Pronunciation: English: /ˈæŋɡəs/ Scottish Gaelic: [ˈɯnɯ.əs̪]
- Gender: Male
- Language: English

Origin
- Languages: Irish and Scottish Gaelic
- Origin: Aonghas
- Derivation: Aonghus > Middle Irish: Áengus > Old Irish: Oíngus

Other names
- Short forms: Gus, Naos (Irish)
- Pet names: Angie, Gussie
- Derivative: Angusina
- See also: Aengus

Angus is an English language masculine given name. It is an Anglicised form of the Irish and Scottish Gaelic name Aonghas (also spelt Aonghus), which is composed of Celtic elements meaning "one" and "choice". Short forms of the name include Gus, which may be lengthened to Gussie, and Irish Naos. Angie (/ˈæŋɡiː/ ANG-ghee; Scottish Gaelic: Angaidh) is a common pet form of the name. The feminine form of Angus is Angusina.

The earliest form of the given name Angus, and its cognates, occurs in Adomnán's Vita Columbae (English: "Life of Columba") as Oinogusius, Oinogussius. This name likely refers to a Pictish king whose name is recorded variously as Onnust, Hungus.

According to historian Alex Woolf, the early Gaelic form of the name, Oengus, was borrowed from the Pictish Onuist, which appears in Brythonic as Ungust. Woolf noted that these names are all derived from the Celtic *Oinogustos. Linguist John Kneen derived this name from two Celtic elements the following way: *Oino-gustos, meaning "one-choice". Woolf also stated that between about AD 350 and AD 660, the Insular Celtic dialects underwent changes which included the loss of the final syllables and unstressed vowels, which affected *Oinogustos thus: *Oin~~o~~gust~~os~~.

== Variations ==
Scottish English	Irish English		Modern Irish	Scottish Gaelic	Middle Irish	Old Irish
Angus	Aengus	Aeneas	Aonghas		Áengus	Óengus
/ˈæŋɡəs/	/ˈeɪŋɡəs/	/ɪˈniːəs/	[ˈeːnˠiːsˠ]	[ˈɯnɯ.əs̪]	[ˈəinɣəs]	[ˈoːi̯nɣus]

== People with the given name ==
=== Angus ===
- Angus Abbey (1925–2025), Australian rules football player
- Angus Abranson, British game designer
- Angus Allan (1936–2007), British comic strip writer and magazine editor
- Angus B. Rothwell (1905–1981), Superintendent of Public Instruction of Wisconsin
- Angus Baker (1849–1924), navigator, ship's captain and political figure in Quebec
- Angus Barnett (born 1963), English actor
- Angus Beith (born 1996), Scottish footballer
- Angus Bernard MacEachern (1759–1835), Scottish Bishop in the Roman Catholic Church
- Angus Bethune (disambiguation), several people
- Angus Brayshaw (born 1996), Australian rules football player
- Angus Black (1925–2018), Scottish international rugby union player
- Angus M. Bowie (born 1949), British classicist
- Angus Brandt (born 1989), Australian professional basketball player
- Angus Brayshaw (born 1996), Australian rules footballer
- Angus Buchanan (disambiguation), several people
- A. A. Burleigh (c. 1845–1938), also known as Angus Augustus Burleigh, American minister, soldier, and teacher
- Angus Cameron (disambiguation), several people
- Angus Cameron (American politician) (1826–1897), American politician
- Angus Cameron (academic) (1941–1983), Canadian linguist
- Angus Cameron (director), British director
- Angus Campbell (disambiguation), several people
- Angus Castle-Doughty (born 1995), English actor
- Angus Clark, guitarist, singer, songwriter, and producer
- Angus Cloud (1998–2023), American actor
- Angus Cottrell (born 1989), Australian rugby union footballer
- Angus Creelman Ree (1929–2009), lawyer and political figure in British Columbia
- Angus Deaton (born 1945), British-American economist and recipient of the Nobel Memorial Prize in Economic Sciences
- Angus Deayton (born 1956), British actor, writer, musician, comedian and broadcaster
- Angus Donald (born 1965), English author
- Angus Douglas-Hamilton (1863–1915), Scottish recipient of the Victoria Cross
- Angus Douglas-Hamilton, 15th Duke of Hamilton (1938–2010), also has subsidiary title as the 22nd Earl of Angus
- Angus Duford (1891–1950), Canadian professional ice hockey player
- Angus Dun (1892–1971), American bishop
- Angus Dunlop (born 1967), Irish cricketer
- Angus Dunnington (born 1967), English poker, online gambling specialist, and professional chess player
- Angus Edmond (born 1976), New Zealand male cyclo-cross cyclist
- Angus Finlay Hutton (1928–2016), British naturalist born in India
- Angus Fletcher (businessman), British businessman, member of the Legislative Council of Hong Kong
- Angus Fogg (born 1967), New Zealand racecar driver
- Angus Frantz (1895–1973), American wrestler
- Angus Fraser (born 1965), English cricketer in the 1980s and 1990s
- Angus Fregon (1880–1956), Australian rules footballer
- Angus Gardner (born 1984), Australian professional rugby union referee
- Angus Gibson (1842–1920), Scottish-born Australian sugar planter and politician
- Angus Goetz (1897–1977), American football player
- Angus Graham (disambiguation), several people
- Angus Gunn (born 1996), footballer
- Angus Hambro (1883–1957), British Conservative Party politician
- Angus Harris (born 1977), Australian businessman
- Angus Houston (born 1947), Australian soldier
- Angus T. Jones (born 1993), American actor known for Two and a Half Men
- Angus W. Kerr (1873–1927), American politician
- Angus King (born 1944), 72nd Governor of Maine
- Angus Konstam (born 1960), Scottish author and historian
- Angus Lennie (1930–2014), Scottish actor
- Angus MacAskill (1825–1862), tallest non-pathological giant in recorded history
- Angus L. Macdonald (1890–1954), Canadian law professor and politician
- Angus MacInnes (1947–2024), Canadian actor
- Angus Mackay (disambiguation), several people (includes McKay)
- Angus MacLise (1938–1979), American musician
- Angus D. MacMillan (1839–1884), merchant and political figure on Prince Edward Island
- Angus Macfadyen (born 1963), Scottish actor
- Angus Matheson (1912–1962), inaugural Professor of Celtic at the University of Glasgow
- Angus McInnes (fl. 1897–1903), Scottish football player (Burnley FC)
- Angus McLaren (born 1988), Australian actor
- Angus Monfries (born 1987), Australian rules footballer
- Angus Robertson (born 1969), Scottish politician
- Angus Sampson (born 1979), Australian actor and filmmaker
- Angus Scrimm (1926–2016), American actor and author
- Angus Stevenson (born 1960), British lexicographer
- Angus Stone (born 1986), Australian folk-blues singer-songwriter and record producer-engineer
- Angus G. Wynne (1914–1979), American businessman
- Angus Young (born 1955), Scottish-born Australian guitarist from the band AC/DC
- Angus Wall (born 1967), American film editor
- Alan Young (born Angus Young) (1919–2016), British actor, star of Mister Ed
- Angus Wilson (born 1970), Australian award winning visual effects artist

=== Aonghas ===
- Aonghas mac Somhairle, (fl. 13th century), Scottish nobleman, son of Somerled
- Aonghas MacNeacail (born 1942), Scottish Gaelic writer
- Aonghas Mór, (fl. 13th century), Scottish nobleman, son of Domhnall mac Raghnaill
- Aonghas Óg of Islay, (fl. 14th century), Scottish nobleman, son of Aonghas Mór
- Aonghas Óg (died 1490), Scottish nobleman, son of John of Islay, Earl of Ross

=== Aonghus ===
- Aonghus Fionn Ó Dálaigh (fl. 1520–1570), Irish poet
- Aonghus Óg of Islay (died 1314×1318/c.1330), Scottish magnate
- Aonghus McAnally (born 1955), Irish broadcaster
- Aonghus Óg McAnally (born 1980), Irish actor
- Aonghus Mór (died c. 1293), Scottish magnate
- Aonghus Ruadh Ó Dálaigh (died 1350), Irish poet

=== Aengus ===
- Aengus Finnan (born 1972), Canadian folk musician
- Aengus Finucane (1932–2009), Roman Catholic missionary of the Spiritan Fathers order
- Aengus Fanning (1942–2012), Irish journalist and former editor of farming of the Irish Independent
- Aengus Mac Grianna (born 1964), newsreader
- Aengus Ó Snodaigh (born 1964), Irish Sinn Féin politician
- Aenghus Ua Flainn (died 1036), Abbot of Clonfert

=== Óengus ===
- Óengus I (died 761), king of the Picts
- Óengus of Tallaght (died 824), Irish bishop, reformer and writer
- Óengus II (died 834), king of the Picts
- Óengus mac Óengusa (died 930), Irish poet
- Óengus of Moray (died 1130), last King of Moray
- Óengus mac Nad Froích (died 489), King of Munster

== Fictional characters ==
- Aengus, figure of Irish mythology
- Angus "Mac" MacGyver, title character from the ABC TV series MacGyver
- Angus Tully, from the 2023 film The Holdovers
- Angus, a character on Oobi
- Angus "Pothole" McDuck, a Disney character who is Scrooge McDuck's uncle
- Angus, a Thane in Shakespeare's Macbeth
- Óengus Olmucaid, legendary High King of Ireland
- Óengus Ollom, legendary High King of Ireland
- Óengus Tuirmech Temrach, legendary High King of Ireland

== See also ==
- Angus (surname)
- List of Irish-language given names
- List of Scottish Gaelic given names
- Magennis
- McGinnis, McGinniss
- McGuinness
- Ó hAonghusa (Hennessey, Hennessy, Hennesy)
