= McGuinness =

- Pronunciation: Ma-Gin-iss
- Language: Irish

Origin
- Origin: Celtic languages: old Irish
- Derivation: Mac Aonghuis
- Meaning: Son of Angus
- Region of origin: Ulster, Ireland

Other names
- Related names: Magennis, McGinnis

McGuinness (also MacGuinness, McGinnis, Guinness) is an Irish surname. It derives from and is an anglicized form of the Gaelic Mac Aonghuis, literally meaning "son of Angus" (Angus meaning "one, choice"). It may also denote the name Mac Naois.

People with the surname include:

- Albert McGuinness, Australian rugby league footballer of the 1930s and 1940s
- Arthur Guinness (1725–1803), Irish brewer and founder
- Bobby McGuinness (born 1954), Scottish footballer
- Brian McGuinness (1927–2019), British philosopher
- Catherine McGuinness (English politician), City of London Corporation
- Catherine McGuinness (judge) (born 1934), Irish Supreme Court judge, former senator
- Charles McGuinness (1893–1947), Irish adventurer, author, and sailor
- Deborah McGuinness (born c. 1960), American computer scientist working in the field of artificial intelligence
- Ed McGuinness, American comic book artist and penciller
- Edwin D. McGuinness (1856–1901), American politician, mayor of Providence, Rhode Island
- Ethan McGuinness (born 2001), Australian gymnast
- Eugene McGuinness (born 1985), British singer-songwriter
- Frank McGuinness (born 1953), Irish playwright, translator and poet
- Georgina McGuinness (née Allen), television journalist from Adelaide
- Gerry McGuinness (born 1953), Scottish rugby union player
- Jim McGuinness (born 1972), Gaelic footballer and manager
- John McGuinness (born 1972), English professional motorcycle racer
- John J. McGuinness (born 1955), Irish Fianna Fáil politician and TD for Carlow-Kilkenny since 1997
- Mairead McGuinness (born 1959), Irish Fine Gael politician and MEP since 2004
- Martin McGuinness (1950–2017), Irish Sinn Féin politician and Deputy First Minister of Northern Ireland, 2007–2017
- Nathan McGuinness, visual effects supervisor
- Nigel McGuinness (born 1976), English professional wrestler
- Norah McGuinness (1901–1980), Irish painter and illustrator
- Paddy McGuinness (born 1973), English comedian
- Paddy McGuinness (civil servant), intelligence officer
- Padraic McGuinness (1938–2008), Australian journalist
- Paul McGuinness (born 1951), manager of Irish rock band U2
- Paul "Mad Dog" McGuinness, Irish guitarist and vocalist with the band Shane MacGowan and The Popes
- Rosamond McGuinness, (1929–2012), music historian
- Séamus McGuinness (1930–2008), Gaelic footballer
- Seán McGuinness (died 1978), Irish Republican, TD for Leix-Offaly 1923–1925
- Wilf McGuinness (born 1937), English football player and manager
- Yvonne McGuinness (born 1972), Irish visual artist

== See also ==
Other people with similar names:

- Alban Maginness (born 1950), Irish SDLP politician
- James Anthony McGuiness (with a single n), birth name of James Anthony Bailey
- Jay McGuiness (with a single n), member of boy band The Wanted

Similar names:

- Magennis
- McGinnis

Other:

- McGuinness Boulevard, roadway
- (Stonebridge) McGuinness and McGuinness (Flint)
- McGuinness Institute, institute
