= Angie (given name) =

Angie is the diminutive form of five different names in English. It can be the pet form of the feminine Angela or Angelina, the masculine Angus or Angelo or the unisex Angel. In Greece, the equivalent of the feminine name Angie is Angeliki.

It is also used in Egypt, as a variant of the name Inji.

Notable people and characters with the name include:

== Politics ==
- Angie Bell, Australian politician
- Angie Bray, British Conservative Party politician
- Angie Brooks, Liberian diplomat and jurist, President of the United Nations General Assembly in 1969
- Angie Hatton (born 1972), American politician
- Angela Merkel, Chancellor of Germany, frequently referred to as Angie
- Angie Motshekga, South African Minister of Basic Education
- Angie O'Steen, American politician
- Angie Paccione, Colorado legislator
- Angie Parkinson, Connecticut legislator
- Angie Heffernan, Fijian human rights and democracy activist
- Angie Zelter, British political activist

== Sports ==
- Angie Akers, American professional beach volleyball player
- Angie Bainbridge, Australian freestyle swimmer and Olympian
- Angie Bradburn, high jumper from the United States
- Angie Braziel, American basketball player in the WNBA
- Angie Hulley (née Pain), British long-distance runner
- Angie Loy, field hockey forward from the United States
- Angie Moretto, Canadian ice hockey forward
- Angie Muller, Australian rules footballer
- Angie Salvagno, bodybuilder from the United States
- Angie Skirving, Australian field hockey player
- Angie Tsang, Hong Kong wushu athlete

== Acting ==
- Angie Cepeda, Colombian actress
- Angie Cheung, Chinese Malaysian actress
- Angie Chiu, Hong Kong actress
- Angie Diaz, Australian actress
- Angie Dickinson, American actress
- Angie Everhart, American actress and former fashion model
- Angie Harmon, American actress and fashion model
- Angie Le Mar, British comedian, writer, director and actor, writer, director and actor
- Angie Milliken, Australian actress

== Music ==
- Angie Aparo, American musician and songwriter
- Angie Brown, British female singer/songwriter
- Angie Hart, Australian pop singer, lead vocalist in the band Frente!
- Angie Reed, American electronica vocalist and musician working in Germany
- Angie Miller (disambiguation), multiple people
- Angie Stone (Angela Laverne Brown), American R&B, soul, and neo soul singer-songwriter, keyboardist, record producer, and occasional actress
- B Angie B (Angela Boyd), African American female R&B vocalist and dancer
- Miss Angie (Angie Turner), American Christian music singer
- Angie Vázquez, Mexican singer

== Television and radio ==
- Angie Coiro, American talk radio host
- Angie Greaves, British radio presenter
- Angie Katsanevas, American television personality
- Angie Martinez, American radio and television personality
- Angie Mentink, American sports announcer

== Other ==
- "Angie" Acland, English pioneer of colour photography
- Angie Best, English-born former Playboy Bunny and model, ex-wife of footballer George Best
- Angie Boissevain, American Soto Zen roshi
- Angie Bonino, Peruvian artist and graphic designer
- Angela Bowie, first wife of David Bowie, often known as Angie Bowie
- Angie Cruz, American/Dominican novelist
- Angie F. Newman, American lecturer, temperance leader, writer, and editor
- Angie Ng, victim of a 2002 murder case in Singapore
- Angie Sage, English author of the Septimus Heap series
- Angie Sanclemente Valencia, Colombian beauty queen and lingerie model believed to be the ringleader of one of the world's largest drug syndicates
- Angie Thomas (born 1988), American young adult author

== Fictional characters ==
- Angie, from the animated film Shark Tale
- Angie, from the 2006 video game "Need for Speed: Carbon"
- Angie, from the television series Skins
- Angie Appleton, on the UK ITV soap opera Coronation Street
- Jesse Hubbard and Angie Baxter, a supercouple from the American daytime drama All My Children
- Angie Falco Benson, on the short-lived comedy series Angie
- Angie Bolen, on the ABC television series Desperate Housewives
- Angie Costello-Weeks, on the ABC daytime drama General Hospital
- Angie D'Amato, on the ABC television series Single Parents
- Angie Diaz, on the Disney animated TV series Star vs. the Forces of Evil
- Angie Jeremiah, in Degrassi: The Next Generation
- Angie Lopez, one of the main characters in the television series George Lopez
- Angie Rebecchi, on the Australian soap opera Neighbours
- Angie Reynolds, on the ITV soap opera Emmerdale
- Angie Russell, on the Australian soap opera Home and Away
- Angie Steadman, from the movie Diary of a Wimpy Kid
- Angie Watts, on the UK soap opera EastEnders
- Angie Yonaga, from the video game Danganronpa V3: Killing Harmony
- Angie Bindlepeep from the 2004 TV animated series, Fatherhood (TV series)

== Related names ==
- Inji (name), feminine Arabic given name

== See also ==
- Angie (disambiguation)
