= Maria Zakharova =

Russian diplomat (born 1975)

- Мария Захарова
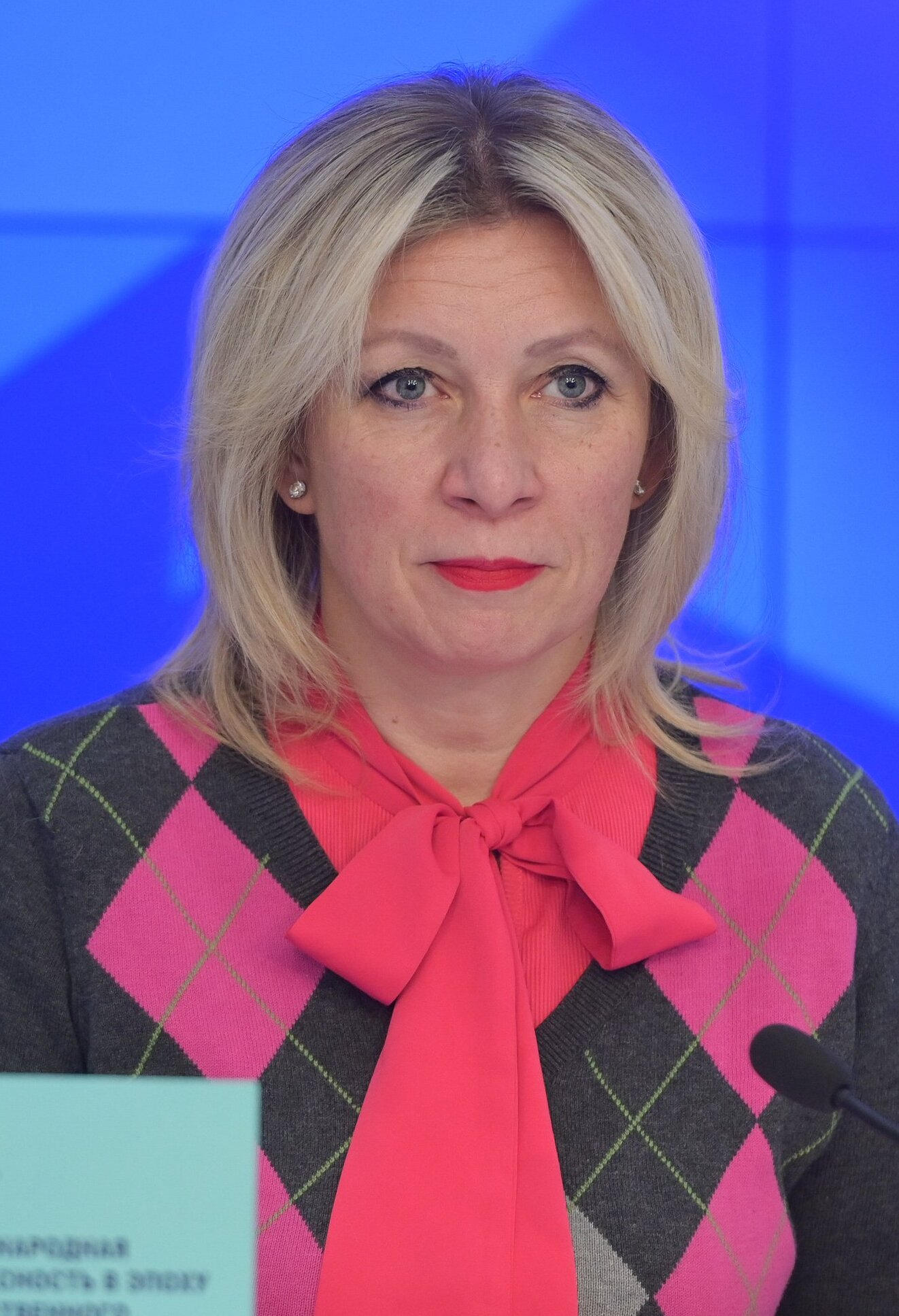
- Zakharova in 2024

Director of the Information and Press Department of the Ministry of Foreign Affairs of the Russian Federation
- Incumbent
- Assumed office 10 August 2015
- Minister: Sergei Lavrov
- Preceded by: Alexander Lukashevich

Personal details
- Born: 24 December 1975 (age 50) Moscow, Soviet Union
- Spouse: Andrei Makarov (m. 2005)
- Children: 1
- Education: Moscow State Institute of International Relations

Maria Vladimirovna Zakharova (Russian: Мария Владимировна Захарова, IPA: [mɐˈrʲijə vlɐˈdʲimʲɪrəvnə zɐˈxarəvə]; born 24 December 1975) is a Russian diplomat who serves as the director of the information and press department of the Ministry of Foreign Affairs of the Russian Federation. She has been the spokeswoman for the Ministry of Foreign Affairs of the Russian Federation since 2015. She has a degree of Candidate of Sciences in history, the Russian equivalent of a PhD.

== Early life and education ==
Zakharova was born to a family of diplomats on 24 December 1975. Her father, Vladimir Zakharov, moved the family to Beijing in 1981 when he was appointed to the Soviet embassy there. The family left Beijing for Moscow in 1993, two years after the Soviet Union had collapsed. Her mother, Irina Zakharova, is an art historian who has worked at Moscow's Pushkin Museum.

In 1998, Maria Zakharova graduated from the Faculty of International Journalism at the Moscow State Institute of International Relations in the field of orientalism and journalism. Her pre-diploma apprenticeship was carried out at the Russian Embassy in Beijing.

== Early career ==
From 2003 to 2005 and from 2008 to 2011, she worked at the Information and Press Department of the Ministry of Foreign Affairs of the Russian Federation. From 2005 to 2008, she was the press secretary of the Permanent Mission of the Russian Federation to the United Nations in New York City. From 2011 to 10 August 2015, Zakharova was the Deputy Head of the Department of Information and Press of the Ministry of Foreign Affairs of the Russian Federation. Her duties included organizing and conducting briefings of the Ministry of Foreign Affairs spokesman, the organization of work of official Ministry accounts in social networks and information support of foreign visits of the Minister of Foreign Affairs. Zakharova is known for her participation in political talk shows on Russian television and for contributing commentary on sensitive political issues on social media. She is one of the most quoted Russian diplomats.

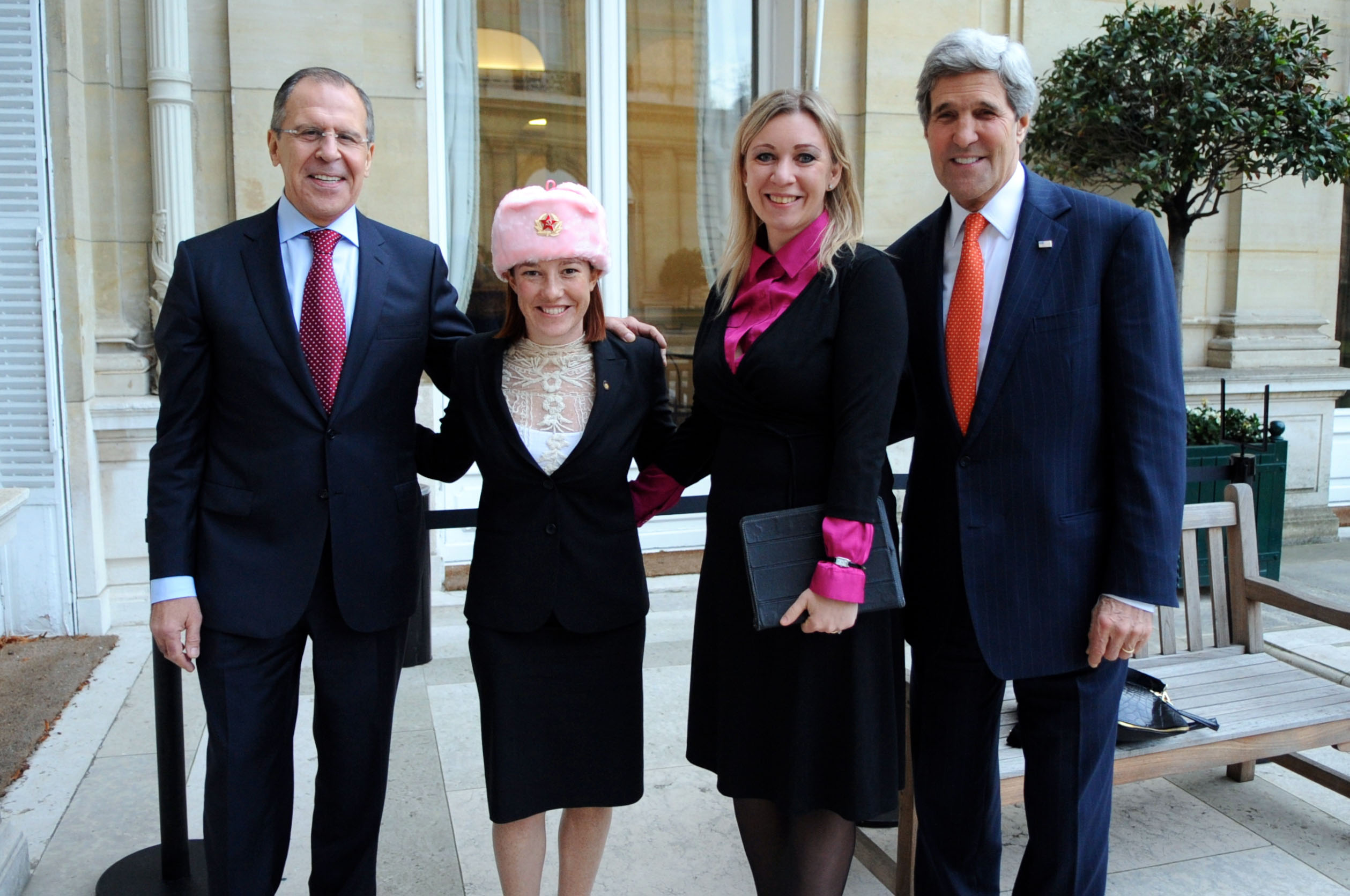
Zakharova with Sergey Lavrov, John Kerry and Jen Psaki in Paris, January 2014

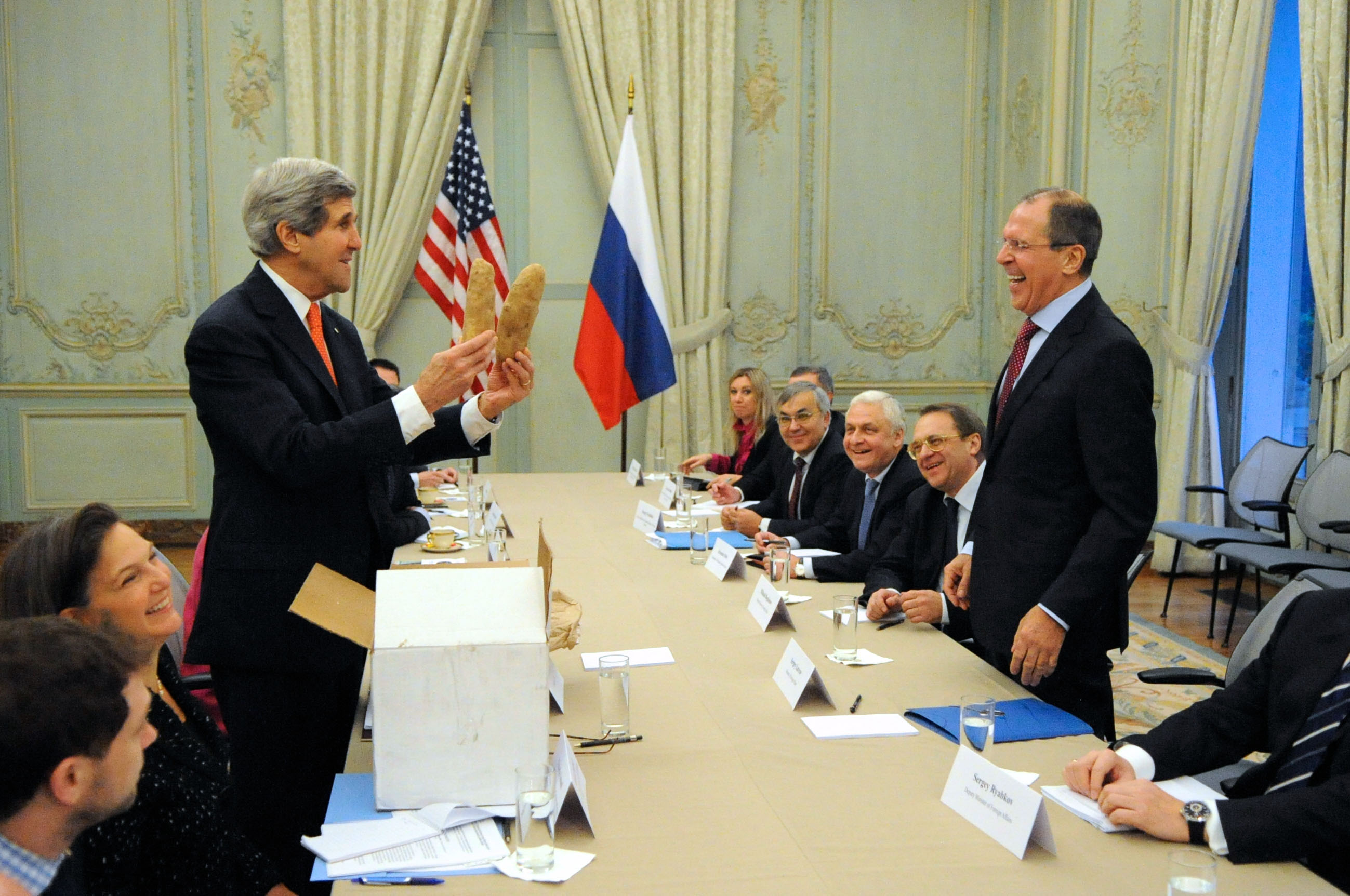
Zakharova with Lavrov, Kerry and Victoria Nuland in January 2014, before the deterioration of relations between Russia and the West following the annexation of Crimea.

== Press Secretary of the Ministry of Foreign Affairs ==
On 10 August 2015, by order of the Ministry of Foreign Affairs, Zakharova was appointed director of the Information and Press Department. Zakharova became the first woman to hold this post. In 2016, she was chosen as one of BBC's 100 Women.

In 2017, Zakharova accused the European Union of hypocrisy over its different behaviour towards the separatist crises in Crimea and Catalonia, after hundreds were injured by Spanish security forces preventing Catalans from voting during the Catalan independence referendum, saying "I see and read what is happening in Catalonia. And Europe will say something to us about the referendum in Crimea and the protection of human rights". On 28 April 2017, Zakharova appeared on Yahoo! News discussing the current international relations with Katie Couric. When Couric brought up the reports of torture against LGBT individuals by the Chechen government, Zakharova said that Russia was conducting an investigation into the matter.

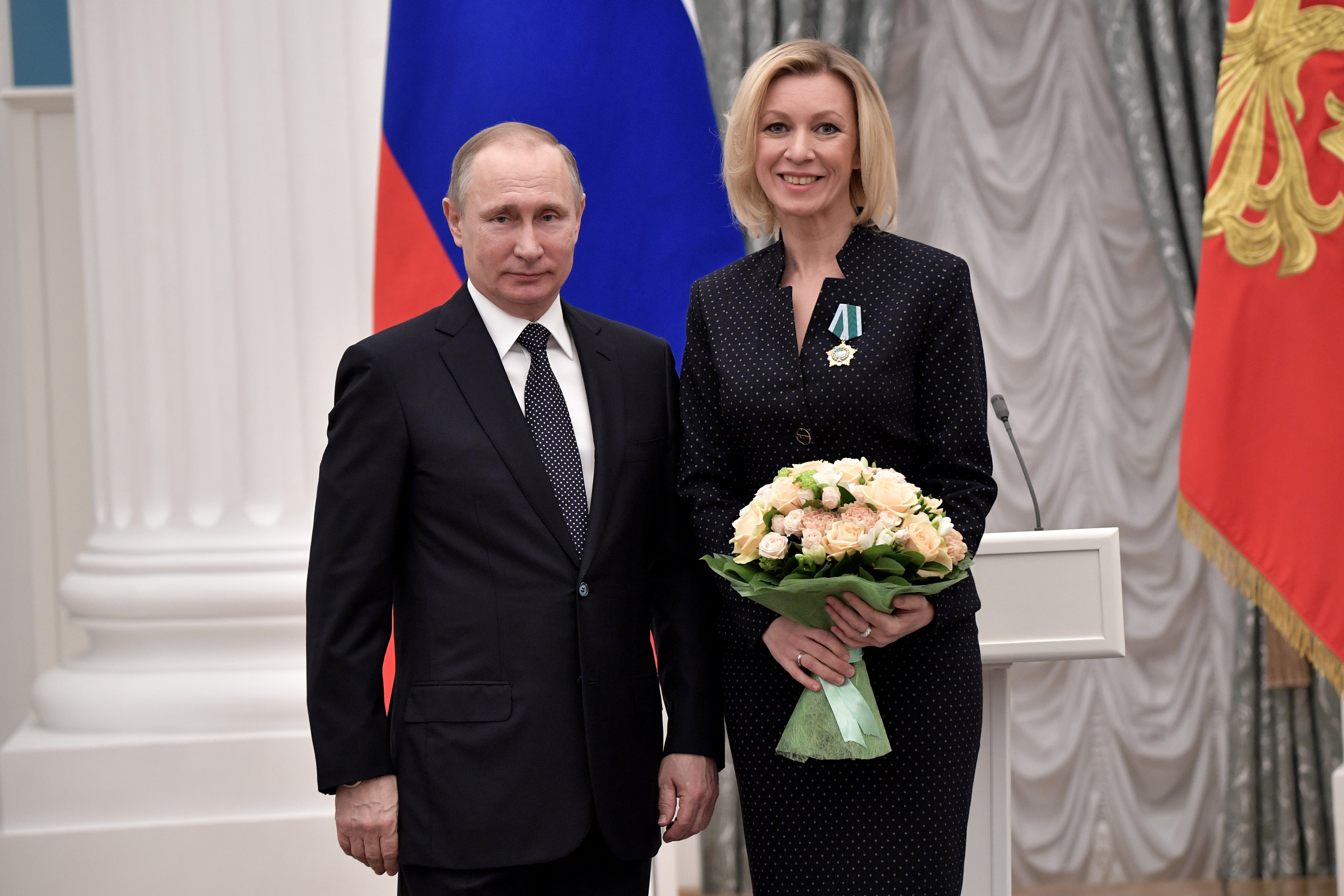
Zakharova with Vladimir Putin in 2017, Order of Friendship ceremony

In June 2019, Reuters reported that Zakharova "offered a tribute to those who died on the western front of World War II and said Moscow appreciated the Allied war effort", adding "It should of course not be exaggerated. And especially not at the same time as diminishing the Soviet Union's titanic efforts, without which this victory simply would not have happened". Zakharova stated, "As historians note, the Normandy landing did not have a decisive impact on the outcome of World War II and the Great Patriotic War. It had already been pre-determined as a result of the Red Army's victories, mainly at Stalingrad (in late 1942) and Kursk (in mid-1943). There was a wish to wait for the maximum weakening of Germany's military power from its enormous losses in the east, while reducing losses in the west."

In 2021, Zakharova criticised a NATO military exercise called Defender-Europe 21, one of the largest NATO-led military exercises in Europe in decades, which began in March 2021. It included "nearly simultaneous operations across more than 30 training areas" in Estonia, Bulgaria, Romania and other countries. She claimed that by conducting these exercises, NATO is gathering a "strike fist" near Russia's borders. On 15 April 2021, she stated that in 2021 alone "NATO is planning seven military exercises in Ukraine. The active phase of the Defender Europe 2021 exercise, the most extensive exercise for many years, is to commence near Ukraine soon."

=== Tenure during Russian invasion of Ukraine ===
On 16 February 2022, Zakharova ridiculed Western media predictions of an imminent invasion of Ukraine by Russia when she had mockingly asked for the schedule of Russian invasion so that she could, ostensibly, "plan [her] vacation" accordingly. On 28 February 2022, she wrote that "Russia did not start a war, it is ending it" and claimed that Russia was acting to end the "systematic extermination of the Donbas population" that had allegedly been ongoing since 2014.

On 5 April 2022, Zakharova criticized the US for its alleged attempts to remove Prime Minister Imran Khan from office over his independent foreign policy, including his relations with Russia. On 2 June 2022, Zakharova warned that Turkey's invasion of northern Syria "would be a direct violation of Syria's sovereignty and territorial integrity" and would "cause a further escalation of tensions in Syria." On 15 June 2022, she praised Russia's strategic partnership with China, adding that "Energy supplies are steadily increasing: China knows what it wants and doesn't shoot itself in the foot. While to the west of Moscow, they shoot themselves in the head." On 5 July 2022, Zakharova said that Israel's incursions and strikes into southern Syria were "categorically unacceptable", and: "We strongly condemn such irresponsible actions that violate Syria's sovereignty and the basic norms of international law, and we demand their unconditional cessation."

In January 2023, she recalled France's colonial past, saying that "French colonialism on the African continent has ended. The era when African countries had to ask someone, in particular France, before making a sovereign decision has ended." On 6 July 2023, U.S. president Joe Biden approved the provision of cluster munitions to Ukraine in support of a Ukrainian counteroffensive against Russian forces in Russian-annexed southeastern Ukraine. Zakharova said Washington's decision to supply Ukraine with cluster munitions showed the "aggressive anti-Russian course taken by the U.S., which is aimed at prolonging the conflict in Ukraine as much as possible." On 7 October 2023, following a Hamas-led attack on Israel, she said that the Israeli–Palestinian conflict "cannot be solved by force, but only by diplomatic means" and called "for the creation of an independent Palestinian state within the 1967 borders, with East Jerusalem as its capital, living in peace and security with Israel."

In December 2023, she declared that peace in the Russo-Ukrainian War could only be achieved if Ukraine accepted "new territorial realities" and a neutral status, saying that "We will not allow the existence on our borders of an aggressive Nazi state from whose territory there is a danger for Russia and its neighbours." She also said that China was a "like-minded partner" and Russia had developed ties with many countries in Asia, Africa, the Middle East and Latin America. According to Zakharova, Russia offers "honest and good-faith co-operation not based on diktat". Zakharova pointed out that 80% of the world's population lived in countries that had not adopted any sanctions against Russia.

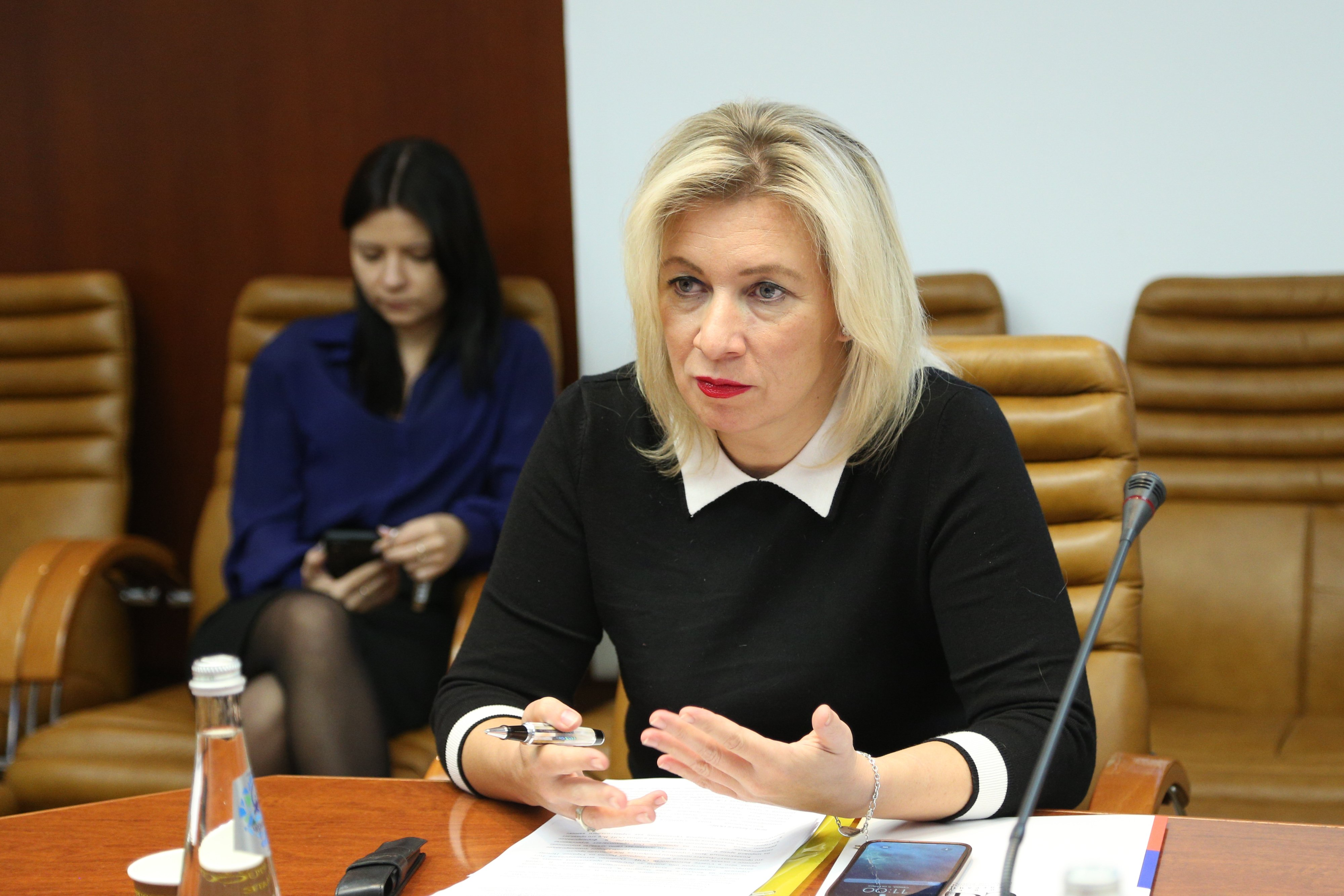
Zakharova in October 2022

In March 2024, she refused to blame the Islamic State – Khorasan Province (IS-K) for the Crocus City Hall attack in Moscow and instead accused the United States of using Islamic State as a "bogeyman" to cover for Ukraine. On 10 August 2024, she condemned the Al-Tabaeen school attack in Gaza, stating that it undermine international efforts to de-escalate the Gaza war and reach an urgent ceasefire and prisoner-captive exchange. On 11 August 2024, Zakharova protested against the Ukrainian incursion into the Kursk Oblast, stating that Ukraine "is continuing its terrorist activity with the sole purpose of intimidating the peaceful population of Russia" and that the incursion "makes no sense from a military point of view."

On 17 August 2024, The Washington Post reported, citing anonymous diplomatic sources, that Ukraine's incursion into Russia disrupted plans for indirect talks in Qatar to halt mutual strikes on energy infrastructure in Ukraine and Russia. Zakharova said that there were "no direct or indirect negotiations between Russia and Ukraine on the safety of civilian critical infrastructure facilities" and that after the assault on the Kursk Oblast, Putin ruled out the possibility of such talks. On 20 August 2024, she condemned the Verkhovna Rada's vote to ban the Ukrainian Orthodox Church of the Moscow Patriarchate (UOC-MP), accusing Ukraine of trying to "destroy true Orthodoxy".

In May 2025, Zakharova called on both parties involved in the Indo-Pakistani conflict to exercise restraint. In June 2025, when it was announced that Blaise Metreweli, whose grandfather Constantine Dobrowolski had been a Nazi collaborator in occupied Ukraine, was appointed Chief of the Secret Intelligence Service in the United Kingdom, Zakharova said that it was part of a trend of putting "descendants of the Nazis in leadership positions in the countries of the collective West". In October 2025, she criticized US sanctions against Russia's largest oil companies Rosneft and Lukoil. In January 2026, Zakharova condemned the ongoing anti-government protests in Iran, describing them as an attempt at a "colour revolution" orchestrated from abroad.

== Sanctions ==
On 23 February 2022, a day before Russia invaded Ukraine and escalated the Russo-Ukrainian war, Zakharova was sanctioned by the European Union alongside other prominent Russian media figures, as "a central figure of the government propaganda", and for having "promoted the deployment of Russian forces in Ukraine". The sanctions include being placed on a No Fly list and the freezing of assets. On 8 March, Australia also imposed sanctions on Zakharova. On 18 March, Zakharova was included in Japan's expanded sanctions list. The United States Department of the Treasury sanctioned Zakharova in June, with New Zealand and the United Kingdom following suit within the year.

== Personal life ==
On 7 November 2005, Zakharova married Andrei Makarov at the Russian Consulate in New York City. The couple have a daughter, Maryana, born in August 2010.

Political offices
Preceded by Alexander Lukashevich	Director of the Information and Press Department of the Ministry of Foreign Affairs of the Russian Federation; 2015-present	Incumbent
