= Paddy McGuinness (civil servant) =

British civil servant

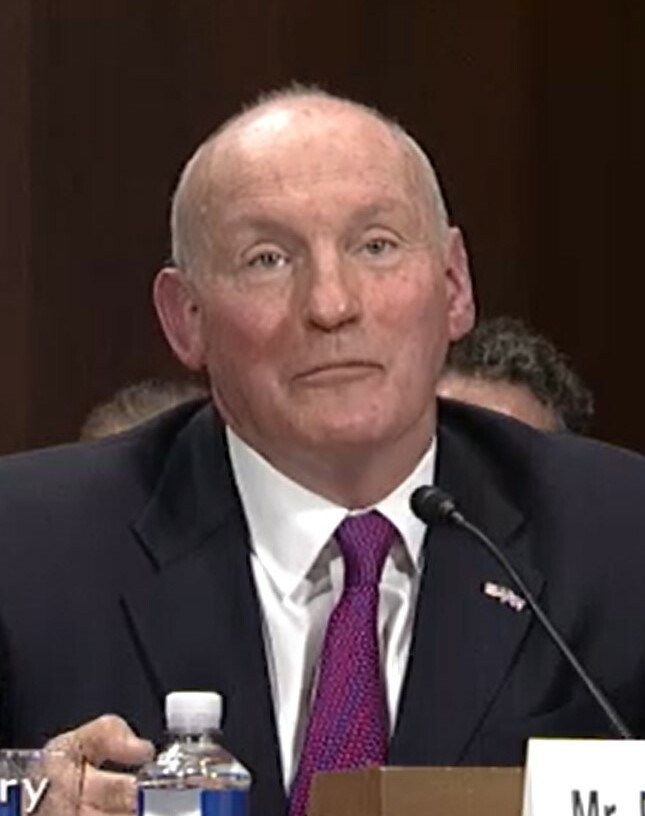
- McGuinness in 2017
- Born: 27 April 1963 (age 62); Oxford, England, U.K.
- Parents: Brian McGuinness (father); Rosamond Cohan (mother)
- Family: Catherine McGuinness (sister)

Patrick Joseph McGuinness CMG OBE (born 27 April 1963) is a former senior British civil servant who now advises businesses and governments globally on their resilience, crisis, technology, data and cyber issues.

McGuinness served as the Deputy National Security Adviser for Intelligence, Security and Resilience in the Cabinet Office, from 2014 to January 2018.

== Early life ==
Born at Oxford to Professors Rosamond McGuinness and Brian McGuinness, he attended Ampleforth College before going up to Balliol College, Oxford, taking a BA in modern history. He has a sister Catherine McGuinness who chaired the Policy and Resources Committee of the City of London Corporation (2017–2022).

== Career in Government service ==
McGuinness joined the Foreign and Commonwealth Office in 1985. His first overseas posting was as Second Secretary in Sana'a from 1988 to 1991. After that, he served as First Secretary in Abu Dhabi from 1994 to 1996, then as Counsellor in Cairo from 1996 to 1999 and in Rome from 2003 to 2006.

McGuinness was appointed the Deputy National Security Adviser for Intelligence, Security, and Resilience in 2014, taking over from Oliver Robbins and replaced by Richard Moore. He advised first PM David Cameron then Theresa May and reported to the National Security Adviser who is Secretary to the National Security Council, alongside the other Deputy National Security Adviser for Foreign and Defence Policy.

=== National Cyber Security Programme ===
As DNSA McGuinness was the Senior Responsible Officer for the UK's two five-year National Cyber Security Programmes overseeing the development of and response to the 2016 National Cyber Security Strategy and through that the launch of the National Cyber Security Centre.

=== The Cloud Act ===
McGuinness was the UK's principal public advocate for the Cloud Act. On 24 May 2017 McGuinness became the first serving British official to testify to a Congressional Committee when he joined Richard W Downing of the US Department of Justice before the US Senate Judiciary Committee subcommittee on Crime and Terrorism advocating for lawful access to data to counter Serious Organised Crime through the Cloud Act. His written evidence is here. On 15 June 2017 he then appeared in front of the Judiciary Committee of the House of Representatives. He has published a number of articles in US newspapers and online.

=== D-Notice Committee ===
McGuinness represented the Cabinet Office on the Defence and Security Media Advisory Committee formerly known as the D-Notice Committee.

=== Undercover Policing Inquiry ===
In January 2016 McGuinness provided written testimony to the Undercover Policing Inquiry on the importance of the "Neither Confirm Nor Deny" principle for National Security.

== Career since 2018 ==
McGuinness is an adviser at Brunswick Group advising on crisis and resilience issues, providing senior counsel to clients on business and political risk.

McGuinness is a co-founder of Oxford Digital Health, an Oxford University spinout providing software as a service to transform healthcare.

McGuinness is a member of the Advisory Board at Glasswall Solutions.

McGuinness was a member of the Oxford Technology and Elections Commission on Technology (OxTEC), which made a series of recommendations aimed at securing the information infrastructure of elections and creating a trusted environment for the democratic use of technology reported in October 2019.

In January 2018, The Sunday Times newspaper reported that McGuinness was to advise the State of Qatar on the security for the 2022 FIFA World Cup.

McGuinness was a special adviser to the UK Parliament's Joint Committee on the National Security Strategy.

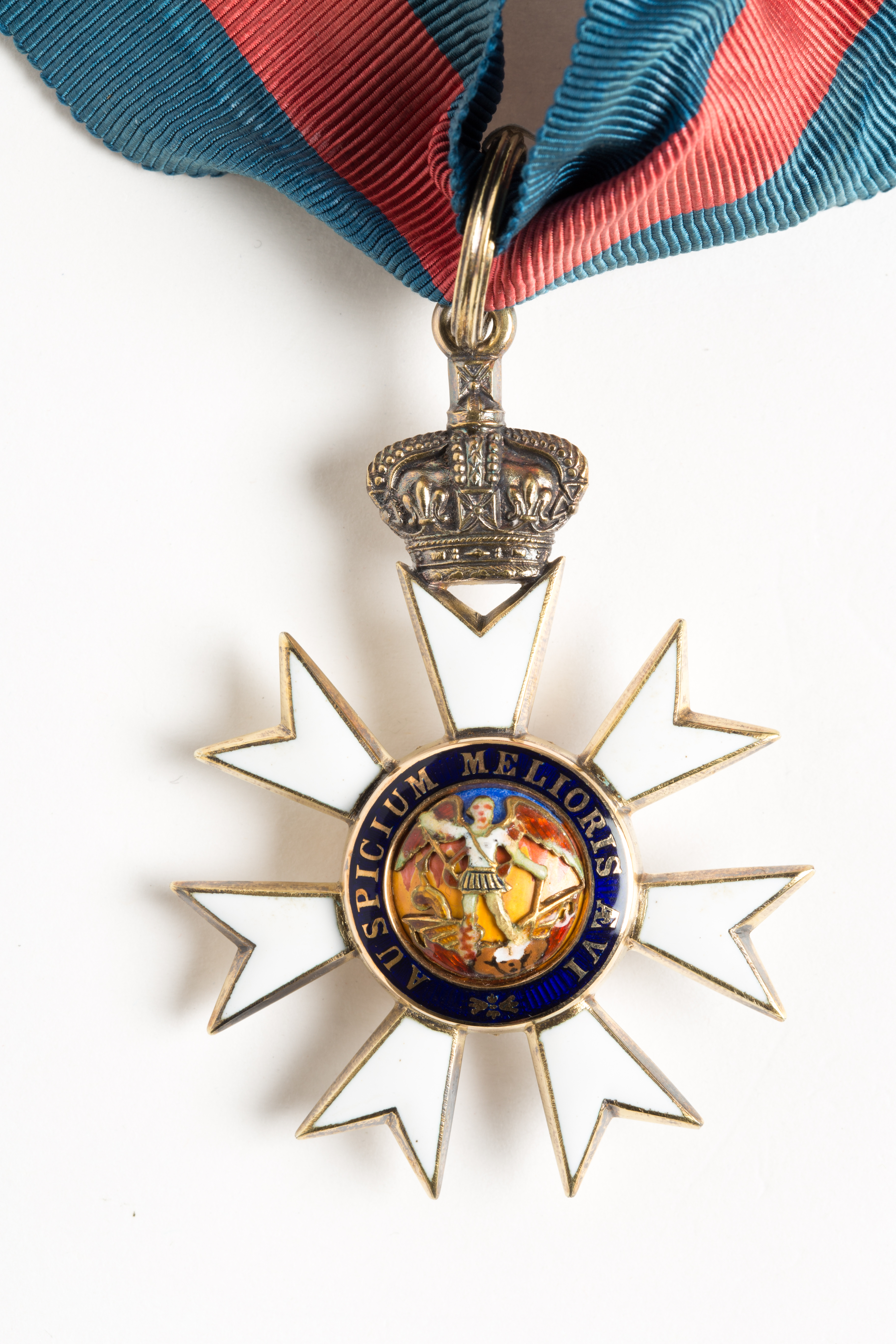
CMG insignia

== Charitable work ==
McGuinness is the Chair of Trustees at St Joseph's Hospice in Hackney, London.

== Honours ==
McGuinness was appointed an Officer of the Order of the British Empire (OBE) in 1997, and a Companion of the Order of St Michael and St George (CMG) in 2014.

Political offices
Preceded by Sir Oliver Robbins	Deputy National Security Adviser for Intelligence, Security, and Resilience, Cabinet Office; January 2014 – January 2018	Incumbent
