= Salvagno =

Salvagno is an Italian surname. Notable persons with this name include:

- Angela Salvagno (born 1976), American bodybuilder
- Leandro Salvagno Rattaro (born 1984), Uruguayan rower
- Maria Aurora Salvagno (born 1986), Italian sprinter
