= McGennis =

McGennis is a surname. Notable people with the surname include:

- Marian McGennis (born 1953), Irish politician
- Paul McGennis, Irish Roman Catholic priest

== See also ==
- McGinnis
