= Catherine McGuinness (English politician) =

Politician and public speaker in the City of London Corporation

Catherine Sidony McGuinness

Chair of the Policy and Resources Committee City of London Corporation
- In office 4 May 2017 – 5 May 2022
- Preceded by: Mark Boleat
- Succeeded by: Chris Hayward

Catherine Sidony McGuinness CBE (born 1959) is an English politician who has served Castle Baynard Ward as a Commoner since 1997, and is a former spokesperson for the City of London Corporation who chaired the Policy and Resources Committee of the Corporation of London as its de facto political leader, from 2017 to 2022.

== Family ==
McGuinness is the daughter of two academics, the philosopher Brian and the music historian Rosamond McGuinness (née Cohan), while her brother, Paddy McGuinness, is a civil servant who served as Deputy National Security Adviser for Intelligence, Security, and Resilience at the Cabinet Office from 2014 to 2018.

In 1988 she married John Gilbert, Chairman of the Cripplegate Foundation and former Liberal Democrat councillor for Islington (2006–2014).

== Career ==
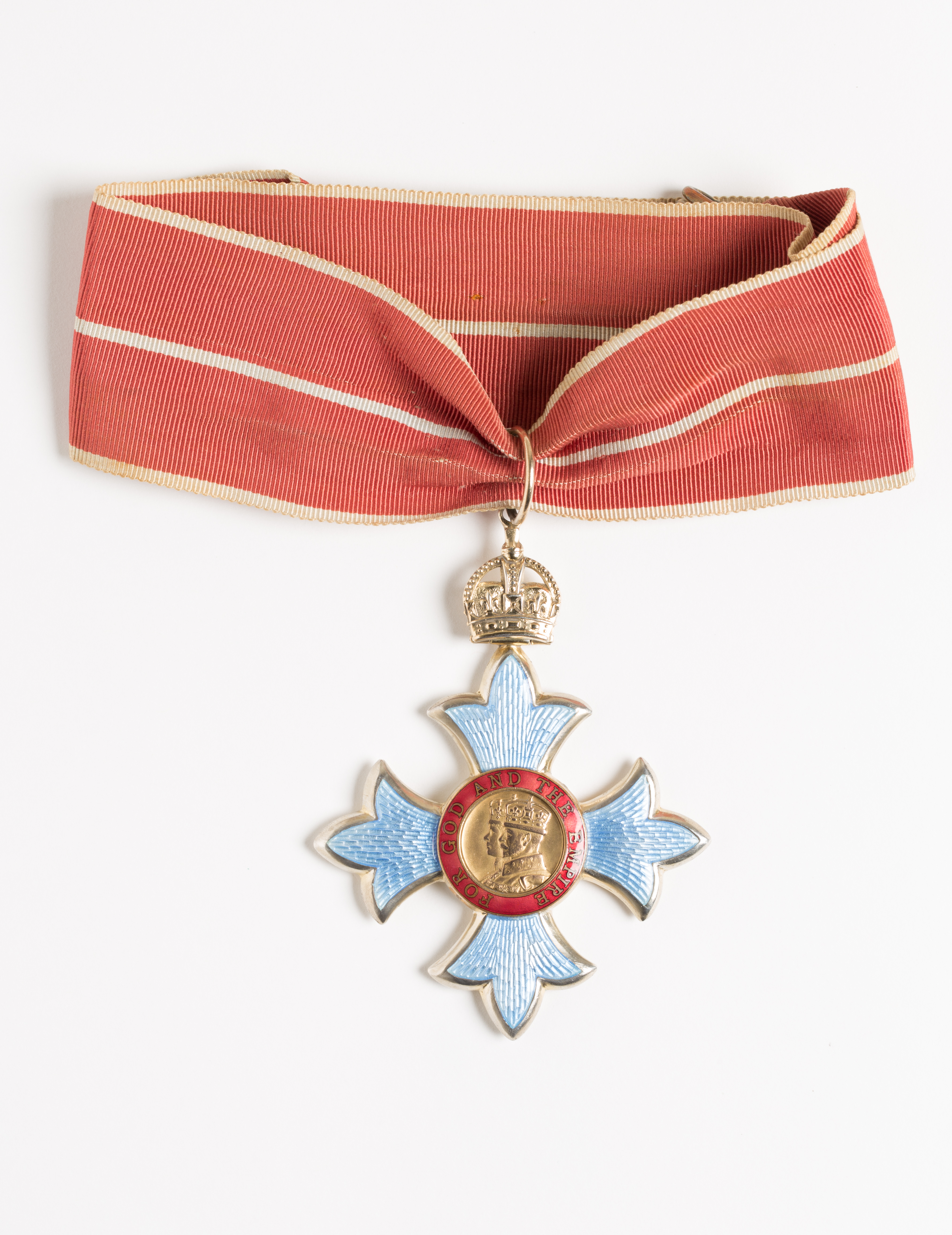
CBE insignia

After reading PPE at St Anne's College, Oxford, McGuinness qualified as a solicitor. She has represented Castle Baynard Ward on the Common Council since 1997. In May 2017 she succeeded Sir Mark Boleat as Chairman of the Policy and Resources Committee of the City of London Corporation, having previously served as Deputy Chair.

A Trustee of Centre for London, McGuinness is also a Court Assistant to the Musicians' Company and a member of the livery of the Educators' and Solicitors' companies.

She was appointed CBE in the 2023 New Year Honours.

== See also ==
- Court of Common Council

Political offices
Preceded by Sir Mark Boleat	Chair of the Policy and Resources Committee; Corporation of London; May 2017 – May 2022	Succeeded by Chris Hayward
