= Andrew Pears =

British barber and soap innovator

- Born: 4 April 1768; 258 years ago Mevagissey, Cornwall, England
- Died: 1845 (aged 74–75); London, England
- Resting place: Kensal Green cemetery
- Occupations: Manufacturer, inventor and businessman
- Known for: Pears Soap
- Relatives: David Pears (great-great-great-grandson)

Andrew Pears was an Englishman, born around 1770, who invented transparent soap. He moved to London in 1789 from his home in Mevagissey, Cornwall, where he had trained as a barber.

He opened a barber's shop in the then-fashionable residential area of Gerrard Street, Soho, that attracted the business of many wealthy families. At that time, London's upper classes were cultivating a delicate white complexion, whereas a tanned face was associated with the working class who toiled outdoors. Andrew Pears realized that there was a need for a gentle soap for these complexions.

In 1807, he found a way of removing the impurities and refining the base soap before adding the delicate perfume of garden flowers. He produced a soap refined in a way in which it looked transparent and made longer-lasting bubbles. The transparency was the unique product plus that established the image of Pears Soap. His method of mellowing and aging each long-lasting Pears Bar for over two months is still used today, where natural oils and pure glycerine are combined with the delicate fragrance of rosemary, cedar and thyme.

In 1835, he took on a partner, his grandson Francis Pears, and they moved to new premises at 55 Wells Street, just off Oxford Street.

Andrew Pears retired from business in 1838, leaving his grandson, Francis, to continue the business of the London-based firm of A & F Pears. He died in 1845.

His great-great-grandson, Thomas Pears (1882–1912), travelled First Class aboard RMS Titanic on the ship's maiden voyage from England to New York in April 1912 with his wife, Edith Ann (Wearne) Pears (1889–1956). Thomas was lost, while Edith was rescued.

The philosopher David Pears (1921–2009) was a descendant of Andrew and Francis Pears via his father Captain Robert Pears (1891–1986).
