= Gus =

Gus is a masculine name, often a diminutive for Angus, August, Augustine/Augustin, Gustave, Constantine, Konstantinos, Augusten, Gustavo, Gusten, Augustus, Aengus, Argus, Fergus, Gustav, Gustafson, Ferguson, and Gussie.

It can also be used as the adaptation into English of the popular Greek name (of Latin origin) Kostas or Konstantinos (Constantin), especially amongst Greek immigrants in English-speaking countries, probably due to similarity in the sound. For Italian-Americans, Gus is short for Gaspare.

Gus may refer to:

== People ==
=== Given name ===
- Gus Allen, American comics artist
- Gus Arnheim (1897–1955), American pianist, bandleader and songwriter
- Gus Boulis (1949–2001), Greek-born businessman and murder victim
- Gus Edwards (vaudeville) (1878–1945), German-born American songwriter, vaudevillian and music producer, born Gustave Schmelowsky
- Gus Edwards (American football) (born 1995), American football player
- Gus Elen (1862–1940), English music hall singer and comedian, born Ernest Augustus Elen
- Gus Greenbaum (1893–1958), American gangster
- Gus Hall (1910–2000), longtime leader of the Communist Party USA, born Arvo Kustaa Halberg
- Gus Hartwig (born 2002), American football player
- Gus Johnson (basketball) (1938–1987), American National Basketball Association player
- Gus Johnson (jazz musician) (1913–2000), American jazz drummer
- Gus McNaughton (1881–1969), British actor
- Gus Pepa (born 1967), founding member of thrash metal band Death Angel
- Gus Russo, American author
- Gus Sonnenberg (1898–1944), American football player and professional wrestler
- Gus Triandos (1930–2013), former Major League Baseball player
- Gus Van Sant (born 1952), American film director, photographer, musician and author
- Gus Varland (born 1996), American baseball player
- Gus Weinberg (c. 1865–1952), actor, writer, and composer appearing in early-twentieth-century American films
- Gus Williams (basketball) (1953–2025), American basketball player
- Gus Williams (musician) (1937–2010), Australian country singer, born Kasper Gus Ntjalka Williams
- Gus Zernial (1923–2011), American Major League Baseball player

=== Nickname ===
- Greg Adams (ice hockey, born 1963), Canadian former National Hockey League player
- Gus Bell (1928–1995), American Major League Baseball player
- Gus Cannon (1883–1979), American blues musician
- Gus Dorner (1876–1956), American Major League Baseball pitcher
- Gus Frerotte (born 1971), American football player
- Phil Gould (born 1958), Australian rugby league broadcaster, journalist, administrator and former player and coach
- Gus Greenlee (1893–1952), Negro league baseball team owner and African-American businessman
- Gus Grissom (1926–1967), one of the seven original American astronauts, killed in the Apollo 1 fire
- Gus Hansen (born 1974), professional Danish poker player
- Gus Henderson (1889–1965), American football coach
- Gustav A. Hoff (1852–1930), German-born American businessman and politician
- Gus Johnson (sportscaster) (born 1967), American sports announcer
- Gus Johnson (comedian) (born 1995), YouTube Personality and comedian
- Gus Kahn (1886–1941), American songwriter, lyricist and musician
- Gus Kelly (1877–1951), Irish cricketer
- Gus Kenworthy (born 1991), British-born American freestyle skier, 2014 Olympic silver medalist
- Gus Ketchum (1897–1980), American professional baseball pitcher with the 1922 Philadelphia Athletics
- Gus MacPherson (born 1968), Scottish football manager and former player
- Gus Mancuso (1905–1984), American baseball player, coach, scout and radio sports commentator
- Gus Mears (1873–1912), English businessman and founder of Chelsea F.C.
- Gus Meins (1893–1940), German-American director
- Gus Mortson (1925–2015), former National Hockey League defenceman
- Gus O'Donnell, Baron O'Donnell (born 1952), British former senior civil servant and economist
- Gus Poyet (born 1967), Uruguayan former footballer
- Gus Sorola (born 1978), American actor, Founding member of Rooster Teeth
- Gus Suhr (1906–2004), American Major League Baseball player
- Gus Weyhing (1866–1955), American Major League Baseball pitcher
- Gus Williams (vaudeville) (1848–1915), American comedian and songwriter
- Gus Williams (outfielder) (1888–1964), German-American Major League Baseball player
- Gus Williams (pitcher) (1870–1890), Major League Baseball pitcher
- Gus Winckel (1912–2013), Dutch World War II soldier
- Gus Yatron (1927–2003), twelve-term member of the United States House of Representatives from Pennsylvania

=== Stage name ===
- Gus Black, singer-songwriter Anthony Penaloza, formerly known simply as Gus
- Gus G or Gus Gus, Greek heavy metal guitarist Kostas Karamitroudis (born 1980)

== Fictional characters ==
- Gus Fring, in the television series Breaking Bad
- Gus Grav, former antagonist from the animated series Bakugan: New Vestroia and Bakugan: Mechtanium Surge
- Gus Grimly, in the television series Fargo
- Gus Griswald, in the television series Recess
- Gus Polinski, in the film Home Alone
- Gus Smith, in the British soap opera Eastenders
- Gus: The Theatre Cat, in the musical Cats
- the title character of Gus (1976 film), a football-playing mule
- Burton "Gus" Guster, in Psych
- Gus the groundhog, "spokesgroundhog" for the Pennsylvania Lottery
- Gus Honeybun, a rabbit who was a mascot for ITV franchises Westward and TSW
- Gus Porter, in the animated television series The Owl House

== Mascots ==
- GUS the eagle, mascot of Georgia Southern University
- Gus, mascot of the Fredericksburg Nationals minor league baseball team

== Animals ==
- Gus (tortoise), a 103-year-old gopher tortoise
- Gus (dinosaur), a fossil Tyrannosaurus Rex sold at auction in 2026

== See also ==
- Gussie
