= David Pears =

British philosopher (1921–2009)

David Pears FBA
- Born: David Francis Pears; 8 August 1921; Bedfont, Middlesex, England
- Died: 1 July 2009 (aged 87); Oxford, England
- Relatives: Andrew Pears (great-great-great-grandfather)

Education
- Education: Balliol College, Oxford (BA)

Philosophical work
- Era: Contemporary philosophy
- Region: Western philosophy
- School: Analytic philosophy
- Institutions: Christ Church, Oxford; Corpus Christi College, Oxford
- Doctoral students: Aaron Sloman
- Notable students: See list: Susan Haack; Derek Parfit; Tom Sorell; Galen Strawson
- Main interests: Philosophy of mind; philosophy of action; philosophy of language
- Notable works: English translation of Wittgenstein's Tractatus Logico-Philosophicus (1961, with Brian McGuinness)
- Notable ideas: Causal theory of action; Realist interpretation of Wittgenstein's Tractatus

David Francis Pears (8 August 1921 – 1 July 2009) was a British philosopher renowned for his work on Ludwig Wittgenstein. Along with Brian McGuinness, he published what became the standard English translation of the Tractatus in 1961.

== Life ==
David Francis Pears was born on 8 August 1921 in Bedfont, Middlesex. He was the second of four sons born to Robert Pears (1891–1986) and Gladys Eveline, née Meyers (1892–1977). His father was a descendant of Andrew Pears, the creator of Pears soap, and Robert's family were amongst those who benefitted from the sale of the company to the Lever Brothers.

Pears attended Westminster School with Richard Wollheim and Patrick Gardiner who became fellow philosophers and lifelong friends. At Westminster he had specialized in classics and it was as a classical scholar that he went to Balliol College, Oxford in 1939. He obtained a first in classical moderations in 1940 but his academic career was interrupted by World War II.

He served in the Royal Artillery, but was seriously injured in a practice gas attack. As a result, Pears was not sent to North Africa with the rest of his regiment. Peacocke reports that "Casualties there were so heavy that, [Pears] said, this accident may have saved his life."

Another accident would help determine just what he would do with it. After leaving the army, he returned to Balliol College and achieved a first in literae humaniores in 1947. The master of Balliol, Sandie Lindsay, thought he ought to try for an assistant lectureship in Latin at Glasgow, but Pears was unsure what he ought to do next.

Jumping, to escape a brawl, out of a window of the Randolph Hotel, Oxford that, unexpectedly, opened onto a well to the basement, Pears landed up in hospital with a broken leg, and a copy of Wittgenstein’s Tractatus. The latter reportedly being grabbed from a friend as he was being carried to the ambulance. Pears left hospital fascinated by Wittgenstein's work and certain that philosophy was his true interest.

On this account he started the Oxford B.Phil but his appointment as research lecturer at Christ Church, Oxford in 1948 meant he did not have to complete it. Pears took up a fellowship in philosophy at Corpus Christi College, Oxford from 1950 to 1960, then returned to Christ Church in 1960 as a tutor in philosophy. There he became reader in philosophy in 1972 and professor of philosophy in 1985, retiring in 1988 as a professor emeritus.

== Works ==
=== Books authored ===
- Bertrand Russell and the British Tradition in Philosophy 1967.
- What is Knowledge? 1971.
- Ludwig Wittgenstein. Viking Press 1970.
- Questions in the Philosophy of Mind 1975.
- Motivated Irrationality. Oxford: Clarendon Press 1984.
- The False Prison: A Study of the Development of Wittgenstein's Philosophy. 2 vols. Oxford: Oxford University Press 1987/1988.
- Hume's System: An Examination of the First Book of His Treatise. Oxford: Oxford University Press 1991.
- Paradox and Platitude in Wittgenstein's Philosophy. Oxford: Oxford University Press 2006.

== Sources ==
- Peacocke, Christopher (2013). "David Francis Pears 1921–2009" (PDF). Biographical Memoirs of Fellows of the British Academy. XII: 325–338.
