= Angus Graham =

Angus Graham may refer to:

- Angus Graham, 7th Duke of Montrose (1907–1992), British-born Rhodesian politician
- Angus Graham (footballer) (born 1987), Australian rules football player
- A. C. Graham (Angus Charles Graham, 1919–1991), sinologist
- Angus Graham (strongman) (c. 1812–1896)
- Angus Cunninghame Graham (1893–1981), Royal Navy officer
- Angus Graham (businessman) (1937–2023), Scottish businessman
