= Angus Buchanan =

Angus Buchanan may refer to:

- Angus Buchanan (naturalist) (1886–1954), Scottish naturalist, explorer and collector
- Angus Buchanan (VC) (1894–1944), English recipient of the Victoria Cross
- Angus Buchanan (rugby union) (1847–1927), Scottish international rugby and cricket player
- Angus A. Buchanan (1861–1914), merchant and political figure in Nova Scotia, Canada
- Angus Gladstone Buchanan (1893–1960), fish merchant and political figure in Nova Scotia, Canada
