= Tom Sorell =

Canadian philosopher based in the UK (born 1951)

- Born: Thomas Edward Sorell; 24 October 1951 (age 75); Mexico City, Mexico
- Occupation: Philosopher

Education
- Education: McGill University (BA, 1972); Balliol College, Oxford (BPhil, 1975); University of Oxford (DPhil, 1978)
- Academic advisors: Brian McGuinness; David Pears

Philosophical work
- Era: Contemporary philosophy
- Region: Western philosophy
- School: Analytic philosophy
- Institutions: Open University; University of Essex; University of Birmingham; University of Warwick
- Main interests: Early modern philosophy; epistemology; philosophy of science; applied ethics; political philosophy; philosophy of technology
- Notable ideas: Sober Hobbesianism

Thomas Edward Sorell (born 24 October 1951) is a Canadian philosopher based in the UK. His work mainly concerns the theory of knowledge, the philosophy of science, early modern philosophy, ethics and political philosophy. He is noted for his writings on Hobbes, scientism and applied ethics. Since 2008, he has worked in ethics and technology both as a researcher and as a consultant. He is the author of Hobbes (1986); Descartes (1987); Moral Theory and Capital Punishment (1987); Scientism (1992); Business Ethics (with John Hendry) (1994); Moral Theory and Anomaly (1999); Descartes Reinvented (2005); and Emergencies and Politics (2013).

== Early life and education ==
Sorell was born in Mexico City in 1951 to European migrants. The family moved to Vancouver, Canada, in 1956 and to Montreal in 1961. He attended the High School of Montreal, entered McGill University in 1968, and graduated in 1972, when he won the Prince of Wales Gold Medal in philosophy. In 1973, he began his BPhil in Philosophy at Balliol College, Oxford, England. He was taught by John McDowell, Gareth Evans, John Mackie, and Simon Blackburn. Supervised by Brian McGuinness, he wrote a thesis on the deep continuity between Wittgenstein's Tractatus Logico-Philosophicus and his very late work, On Certainty. After completing his BPhil, Sorell wrote a thesis under the supervision of David Pears, defending a version of the causal theory of knowledge. He was awarded the Oxford DPhil in 1978.

== Teaching career ==
Sorell held temporary lectureships at St. Anne's, Balliol, and Queen's Colleges in Oxford in the mid-1970s before joining the philosophy department at the Open University in 1979, working alongside Rosalind Hursthouse and Janet Radcliffe Richards. In 1992, he was appointed Reader in Philosophy at Essex University, and was promoted to Professor in 1996. From 2003 to 2005, he acted as co-director of the Human Rights Centre at Essex. He moved to Birmingham University in 2006 as John Ferguson Professor of Global Ethics. In 2013, he became Professor of Politics and Philosophy at Warwick University, where he directs the Interdisciplinary Ethics Research Group. He was a Faculty Fellow in the Ethics and the Professions program at Harvard in 1996–7, and a visiting professor in philosophy at the Chinese University of Hong Kong in 2013.

== Work ==
Sorell has published extensively in early modern philosophy, especially on Hobbes and Descartes, and has co-edited article collections on history of philosophy and analytic philosophy, on the relationship of canonical to non-canonical figures in early modern philosophy, and on the relationship between ancient and modern philosophers. He claims that history of philosophy and problem-solving analytic philosophy can be highly complementary. His Descartes Reinvented (2005) and Emergencies and Politics: A Sober Hobbesian Approach (2013) are applications of his views on how to harmonise the disciplines of problem-solving analytic philosophy and history of philosophy. His book Scientism: Philosophy and the Infatuation with Science (1991) articulates a pro-science position while criticising what Sorell sees as a tendency, especially in American philosophy, to overvalue science and overdo naturalism. In ethics, Sorell defends theory against the claims of anti-theorists, including Bernard Williams. His work in applied ethics concerns capital punishment, technology, including robotics and AI, surveillance, privacy, counter-terrorism, organised crime, emergency ethics including pandemic ethics, microfinance, and responsibility in the 2008 financial crisis. His latest work considers the various harms involved in several kinds of online crime and retaliation against online crime. His work in applied ethics is regularly pursued with practitioners in various fields, including law enforcement, intelligence services, technology, business, healthcare and politics.

== Major publications ==
- Privacy and Surveillance [Cambridge Elements in Political Philosophy] (Cambridge University Press, 2026)
- with Sven Bernecker ed. The Ethics and Epistemology of Vaccine Hesitancy (Routledge, 2026).
- with Dempsey, J and Cowton, C. eds. Business Ethics After the Financial Crisis (Routledge, 2019)
- with K. Kadjimatheou, J. Guelke eds. Security Ethics (Routledge, 2016)
- with L Cabera, eds. Microfinance, Rights and Global Justice (Cambridge University Press, 2015)
- Emergencies and Politics (Cambridge University Press, 2013)
- with Jill Kraye and John Rogers, eds. Scientia in Early Modern Philosophy (Springer, 2009).
- with Jill Kraye and John Rogers, eds. Insiders and Outsiders in Early Modern Philosophy (Routledge, 2009).
- Descartes Reinvented (Cambridge University Press, 2005).
- with John Rogers, eds. Analytic Philosophy and History of Philosophy (Oxford University Press, 2005).
- with L. Foisneau and J-C Merle, eds. Leviathan Between the Wars: Hobbes’s Impact on Early Twentieth Century Political Philosophy (Peter Lang, 2005).
- with L. Foisneau, eds. Leviathan After 350 Years (Oxford University Press, 2004).
- With John Rogers, eds. Hobbes and History (Routledge, 2000).
- ed. Descartes. Dartmouth Readings in the History of Philosophy (Ashgate, 1999).
- Moral Theory and Anomaly. Aristotelian Society Monograph Series (Blackwell, 1999).
- ed. Health Care, Ethics, and Insurance (Routledge, 1998).
- with R. Ariew, J. Cottingham, eds. and trans. Descartes: Background Source Materials (Cambridge University Press, 1998).
- ed. The Cambridge Companion to Hobbes, 3rd edn (Cambridge University Press, 1996).
- ed. The Rise of Modern Philosophy (Oxford University Press, 1993).
- Moral Theory and Capital Punishment (Blackwell, 1987)
- Descartes (Oxford University Press, 1987) [repr. in the Oxford Past Masters and Very Short Introductions series, and widely translated].
