= Gus (disambiguation) =

Gus is a masculine given name.

Gus or GUS may also refer to:

== Animals ==
- Gus (bear) (1985–2013), a polar bear at the Central Park Zoo in New York City
- Gus (fish) (died 2023?), a blue groper who swam alongside divers and snorkelers in the Sydney suburb of Cronulla in New South Wales, Australia

== Arts and entertainment ==
- Gus (1976 film), an American comedy
- Gus (2011 film), an Australian animated short
- Gulder Ultimate Search, a Nigerian reality show
- Guster, formerly Gus, an American alternative rock band
- Gus Fring, From the TV series, Breaking Bad

== Businesses ==
- GUS (retailer), a defunct British retailer
- Global University Systems, a Dutch education company
- Gus' Pretzels, a pretzel maker in St Louis, Missouri
- Gus's, a cafe in Canberra, Australia

== Military and police ==
- Groupes urbains de sécurité, a defunct Moroccan police unit
- Gus-class LCAC, a Soviet Navy assault hovercraft class
- GUS, designation of slow westbound UG convoys in World War II

== Places ==
- Gus, Kentucky, an unincorporated community
- Gus (river), Russia

== Other uses ==
- Central Statistical Office (Poland) (Polish: Główny Urząd Statystyczny)
- Gravis Ultrasound, a PC sound card
- GUS reporter system, a molecular biology technique
