= George McGinnis (disambiguation) =

George McGinnis (1950–2023) was an American basketball player.

George McGinnis may also refer to:

- George Francis McGinnis (1826–1910), United States general
- George Washington McGinnis or Jumbo McGinnis (1854–1934), American baseball pitcher

== See also ==
- McGinnis
