= McGinnis =

McGinnis is a surname. Notable people with the surname include:

- Alan Loy McGinnis (1933–2005), American Christian psychotherapist and author
- Austin MacGinnis (born 1995), American football player
- Benoît McGinnis, Canadian actor
- Brian McGinnis, American firefighter and political candidate
- Charles McGinnis (1906–1995), American Olympic athlete
- Dave McGinnis (born 1951), American football coach
- Donna McGinnis (born 1968), Canadian Olympic swimmer
- Edward McGinnis, birth name of Eddie Large (1941–2020), British entertainer
- Gary McGinnis (born 1963), Scottish football player
- George McGinnis (1950–2023), American basketball player
- George McGinnis (disambiguation)
- Hawk McGinnis (Harry Lee McGinnis, born 1926), American walking around the world
- Howard Justus McGinnis (1882–1971), American academic
- Ian McGinnis (born 1978), American basketball player
- James D. McGinnis (1932–2009), American real estate agent and politician from Delaware
- Jarred McGinnis (born 1976/77), American writer
- John McGinnis, American legal professor and author
- Jumbo McGinnis (1854–1934), American professional baseball player
- Megan McGinnis, American stage actress
- Michael McGinnis (disambiguation)
- Mike McGinnis (born 1973), American saxophonist, clarinetist, and composer
- Mindy McGinnis, American writer
- Niall MacGinnis (1913–1977), Irish actor
- Noble L. McGinnis (1829–1898), Confederate colonel
- Paul McGinnis (born 1973), American puppeteer
- Rick McGinnis, Canadian columnist and photojournalist
- Robert McGinnis (1926–2025), American illustrator of paperback book covers and movie posters
- Robert L. McGinnis, American scientist, technology entrepreneur, and inventor
- Ross A. McGinnis (1987–2006), American soldier, Medal of Honor recipient
- Ryan McGinnis, American actor and dancer
- Sid McGinnis (born 1949), American musician and guitarist
- Tom McGinnis (1947–2019), American professional golfer
- William McGinnis (disambiguation)

== Fictional characters ==
- Terry McGinnis and his family, in the animated series Batman Beyond

== See also ==
- McGinniss
- McGuinness
