= National Security Council (United Kingdom) =

British government Cabinet committee

United Kingdom National Security Council

Committee overview
- Formed: 12 May 2010
- Committee executive: Andy Burnham, Prime Minister (Chair); Deputy National Security Advisers (Secretary)
- Parent department: Cabinet Office
- Website: gov.uk/government/groups/national-security-council

The National Security Council is a United Kingdom cabinet committee. The Council's terms of reference were said in September 2022 to include matters relating to national security, foreign policy, defence, trade, international relations, development, resilience and resource security. As of 2024, the meetings are held weekly.

The NSC has counterparts in the national security councils of many other nations. The incumbent National Security Adviser (NSA) is Jonathan Powell.

== History ==
The then National Security Council was established on 12 May 2010 by Prime Minister David Cameron, in part as a response to a Public Accounts Committee report "Who does UK National Strategy?". The NSC formalised national security decision making, which had previously been carried out in informal groups largely composed of officials. It increased the power of the Prime Minister, who chairs the council, and brought senior Cabinet ministers into national security policy making, giving them access to the highest levels of intelligence. It coordinates responses to threats faced by the United Kingdom and integrates at the highest level the work of relevant government entities with respect to national security. The council reflected the central coordination of national security issues seen in the Committee of Imperial Defence, which operated from 1902 until 1947, while also being partly modelled on the United States National Security Council.

The first National Security Adviser (NSA) was also appointed on 12 May 2010.

From 1 April 2015 the council oversaw the newly created Conflict, Stability and Security Fund, a fund of more than £1 billion per year for tackling conflict and instability abroad. Following a critical inquiry into the fund by the Joint Committee on the National Security Strategy in 2016, where the committee stated that the fund was secretive and "There is a risk that the CSSF is being used as a 'slush fund' [for projects that do not] meet the needs of UK national security", fund spending at the country level was disclosed and an annual report produced.

In April 2019, an inquiry, which could lead to criminal proceedings, was announced into the leaking to The Daily Telegraph of a decision by the NSC to allow Huawei to bid for 'non-core' elements of the construction of the prospective 5G network.

In the early months of Johnson's premiership, several sub-committees of the NSC ceased to exist. Additionally, the NSC met weekly during the ministries of David Cameron and Theresa May, but didn't meet at all between January and May 2020, under Boris Johnson. Johnson's non-use of the NSC has been criticised.

The Council was briefly renamed the Foreign Policy and Security Council (FPSC) under Prime Minister Liz Truss. The list of Cabinet Committees published 3 November 2022, confirmed the name had been changed back to National Security Council under Prime Minister Rishi Sunak.

In September 2024, it was reported that Prime Minister Keir Starmer had begun holding weekly meetings for the first time in years.

Since December 2024, when the role of National Security Adviser was taken up by a political appointee, the role of secretary to the National Security Council has been fulfilled by the Deputy National Security Advisers.

== Membership ==
As of September 2026, the National Security Council considers the strategic approach to national security, foreign policy, resilience, international relations, economic security, trade, development, defence and global issues. Its membership is as follows:

Image	Member	Office(s)
	Andy Burnham (Chair)	Prime Minister; First Lord of the Treasury; Minister for the Civil Service; Minister for the Union
	Louise Haigh	First Secretary of State; Chancellor of the Duchy of Lancaster; Minister for the Cabinet Office
	John Healey	Chancellor of the Exchequer; Second Lord of the Treasury
	Ed Miliband	Secretary of State for Foreign, Commonwealth and Development Affairs
	Shabana Mahmood	Secretary of State for the Home Department
	Wes Streeting	Secretary of State for Defence
	Ellie Reeves	Attorney General for England and Wales; Advocate General for Northern Ireland
	Dan Jarvis	Minister of State for Security

Other ministers and senior officials attend the NSC and National Security Ministers (NSM) where applicable. These other figures have been noted to include the Chief of the Defence Staff (not the individual chiefs of each service), the heads of intelligence agencies and the Leader of the Opposition. Stakeholders including the devolved governments, local authorities and external experts are also consulted in preparation for meetings.

== National Security Council (Nuclear) ==
To consider matters around nuclear deterrence and nuclear security.

Image	Member	Office(s)
	Andy Burnham (Chair)	Prime Minister; First Lord of the Treasury; Minister for the Civil Service; Minister for the Union
	Louise Haigh	First Secretary of State; Chancellor of the Duchy of Lancaster; Minister for the Cabinet Office
	John Healey	Chancellor of the Exchequer; Second Lord of the Treasury
	Ed Miliband	Secretary of State for Foreign, Commonwealth and Development Affairs
	Shabana Mahmood	Secretary of State for the Home Department
	Wes Streeting	Secretary of State for Defence
	Miatta Fahnbulleh	Secretary of State for Energy Security and Net Zero

== National Security Council (Resilience) ==
To oversee implementation and delivery of resilience matters.

Image	Member	Office(s)
	Louise Haigh (Chair)	First Secretary of State; Chancellor of the Duchy of Lancaster; Minister for the Cabinet Office
	John Healey	Chancellor of the Exchequer; Second Lord of the Treasury
	Shabana Mahmood	Secretary of State for the Home Department
	Wes Streeting	Secretary of State for Defence
	Jonathan Reynolds	Secretary of State for Business, Innovation, Science and Trade
	Yvette Cooper	Secretary of State for Health and Social Care
	Angela Rayner	Secretary of State for Housing, Communities and Local Government
	Miatta Fahnbulleh	Secretary of State for Energy Security and Net Zero
	Lisa Nandy	Secretary of State for Digital, Culture, Media and Sport
	Angela Eagle	Secretary of State for Environment, Food and Rural Affairs
	Dan Jarvis	Minister of State for Security

== National Security Secretariat ==
The size and shape of the National Security Secretariat (NSS) and its senior leadership has fluctuated since its inception in May 2010. From July 2010, there were two Deputy National Security Advisers (DNSAs): Julian Miller for Foreign & Defence Policy and Oliver Robbins for Intelligence, Security & Resilience. By March 2013, Hugh Powell – previously a National Security Secretariat Director – had been promoted to a newly created third DNSA position. As of 6 November 2014, there were three DNSAs: Hugh Powell as DNSA (Foreign Policy), Julian Miller as DNSA (Defence, Nuclear and Strategy) and Paddy McGuinness as DNSA (Intelligence, Security & Resilience). As of early December 2014, the National Security Secretariat was staffed by 180 officials and comprises five directorates: Foreign & Defence Policy; the Civil Contingencies Secretariat; Security & Intelligence; the Office of Cyber Security and Information Assurance, and UK Computer Emergency Response Team (CERT UK). As of 10 February 2015, Liane Saunders – previously the National Security Secretariat's Director for Foreign Policy and its Afghanistan/Pakistan Coordinator – was described as an Acting Deputy National Security Adviser (Conflict, Stability and Foreign Policy).

On 16 June 2016, the Cabinet Office released staff data, correct as of 31 March 2016, listing two current Deputy National Security Advisers: Paddy McGuinness (responsible for Intelligence, Security & Resilience) and then Brigadier Gwyn Jenkins (responsible for Conflict, Stability & Defence). Jenkins appeared to have been in post since at least June 2015. Prior to becoming a deputy National Security Adviser, Jenkins was the military assistant to prime minister David Cameron.

As of April 2017, it was announced that a diplomat, Christian Turner, had replaced Jenkins as the second Deputy National Security Adviser, with a portfolio comprising "foreign and defence policy". According to one of Turner's tweets, dated 13 April 2017, his first week as Deputy National Security Adviser was the week commencing Monday 10 April 2017. Turner is now the High Commissioner to Pakistan; he was replaced by David Quarrey in July 2019.

It was reported on 14 January 2018 that Paddy McGuinness was leaving the National Security Secretariat. His successor as deputy national security adviser for intelligence, security & resilience, Richard Moore, announced his appointment on 8 January via his personal Twitter account. Moore's tenure as deputy NSA was relatively brief (circa three months), ending in early April when he returned to the Foreign and Commonwealth Office as Political Director, a move he also announced via Twitter on 8 April. Although unconfirmed publicly by the UK government, Madeleine Alessandri had replaced Moore as the second deputy national security adviser. However, in September 2018, Alessandri's name and appointment was mentioned in a government response to the Intelligence and Security Committee of Parliament and a list of government salaries. Alessandri apparently took up her appointment in July 2018. Alessandri has left her Deputy NSA post to work in the Northern Ireland Office in January 2020. Alessandri has been replaced by Beth Sizeland while Alex Ellis has also been added as a deputy with the title 'Deputy National Security Adviser for the Integrated Review on diplomacy, development and defence'. Sizeland's appointment was confirmed in an oral evidence by Mark Sedwill, however, as of 25 May 2020, her appointment has not been updated on the Cabinet Office website.

As of October 2020, Quarrey has taken over the post of acting NSA while Lord Frost remains Chief Negotiator for the European Union talks. On 29 January 2021, it was announced that Stephen Lovegrove, not Frost, would be appointed as National Security Adviser. In April 2022, Quarrey was appointed as the UK's Permanent Representative to NATO. He was succeeded by Sarah Macintosh. Beth Sizeland was succeeded by Matthew Collins at an unknown date and the title was retitled as Deputy National Security Adviser (Intelligence, Defence and Security). As of March 2025, there were reportedly three deputy National Security Advisers – Matthew Collins, Jonathan Black, and Nick Catsaras – although the precise dates of their appointments and distribution of responsibilities is not available on the Gov.uk website.

== See also ==
- British intelligence agencies
- Government War Book
