= Angus Harris =

Australian businessman (born 1977)

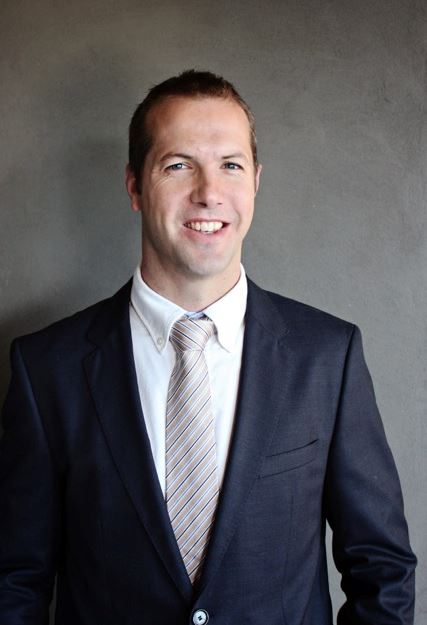
- Angus Harris, Co-CEO of Harris Farm Markets
- Born: 1977 (age 48–49); Sydney, Australia
- Education: University of Sydney
- Occupation: Entrepreneur
- Known for: Co-CEO of Harris Farm Markets

Angus Harris (born 1977) is an Australian businessman, who is the present co-CEO of Harris Farm Markets.

== Background ==
Angus Harris was born in 1977. He acquired his bachelor's degree in commerce from the University of Sydney in 1999 and his Master of Applied Finance from Macquarie University in 2003.

Prior to this, he worked at the Research Division of JP Morgan Chase. He catered to quantitative research at the firm. Before that, he also spent 5 years in the Banking and Finance industry both in Australia and abroad as a Quantitative Equities Analyst.

== Career ==
=== With Harris Farm Markets ===
As Co-CEO, Angus Harris is primarily responsible for Finance, M&A and E-Commerce for the Harris Farm Markets group of companies. The group comprises 25 fresh food retail outlets, 2 Wholesale Fruit and Vegetable Market agencies, a Wholesale Fruit and Vegetable buying operation and an export business. He has worked in their family business since 2003, filling the roles of CIO and CFO before becoming the present Co-CEO.
