= Angus Buchanan (naturalist) =

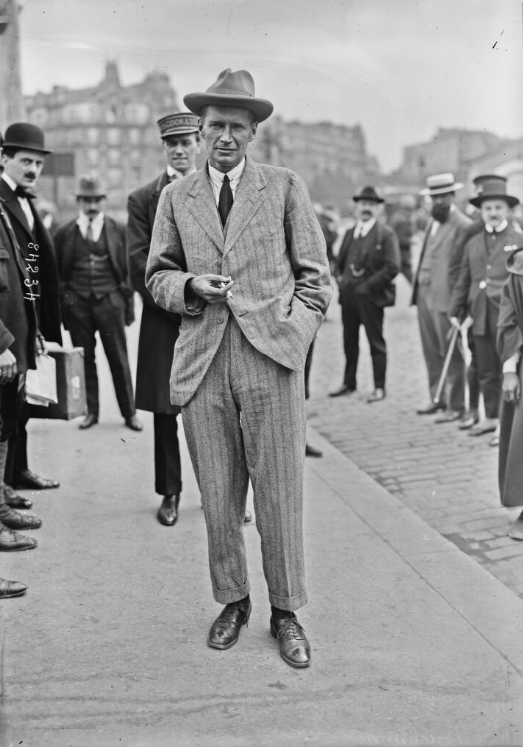
- Born: 5 May 1886; Kirkwall
- Died: 5 February 1954 (aged 67); Edinburgh
- Citizenship: Scotland
- Scientific career
- Fields: natural history, ornithology

Angus Buchanan (5 May 1886 – 5 February 1954) was a Scottish naturalist, explorer and collector.

== Career ==
Buchanan served as a soldier in East Africa during World War I in the spring of 1915, until he fell ill and was sent back to South Africa in September 1917. He ended the war with the rank of captain. During his stay, he amassed important collections of plants and animals, and his first book, "Three Years of War in East Africa", contains many observations of natural history.

From 1919 to 1920, he led an expedition for the Walter Rothschild Zoological Museum, who sought to collect specimens of fauna between northern Nigeria and the Aïr Mountains further north. He reached Lagos in November 1919, and travelled by train to Kano. In January, he arrived at Zinder, occupied by the French, where he stayed for four weeks collecting birds. From there he crossed Aderbissinat to arrive at Agadez, at the foot of the Aïr in April. He began his return journey via Tanout, from where he returned to Europe in September 1920. He contracted a high fever during the rainy season, from which he needed several months to recover. During the expedition, Buchanan amassed a collection of 168 species of birds, butterflies, and mammals, which was considered an extraordinary feat given the scarce desert environment he had visited.

From 1922 to 1923, Buchanan made a complete northward crossing of the Sahara. He initially traveled from Lagos to Kano, as in his previous expedition, and in March 1922 from Kano he left for the Sahara part of Niger. In June 1923, he arrived in Tuggurt in Algeria, and finally arrived at Algiers. The expedition resulted in important zoological discoveries.

Buchanan's popularity was bolstered by the best-selling travel documentary Crossing the Great Sahara, which he produced from footage by cameraman T.A. Glover, who accompanied the expedition. In the film, in addition to the landscapes, the Fulani and Maguzawa danced, fought, hunted and played music. Contemporaries praised the film's realism, albeit it was later judged as a typical colonial film that hinted at the superiority of European civilisation and presented a voyeuristic view of Africa. He was honoured twice by the Royal Scottish Geographical Society: in 1924, with an honorary member for his services to society and geography, and in 1930, as the first recipient of the Mungo Park Medal, for his outstanding contribution to geographical knowledge through exploration.

== Works ==
- Three Years of War in East Africa John Murray, London 1919
- Wild life in Canada John Murray, London 1920
- Exploration of Aïr. Out of the World North of Nigeria John Murray, London 1921
- Sahara London 1926
- The City of the Seven Palms John Murray, London 1927
- Gain. A Tale of the Canadian Northland John Murray, London 1932
- Some impressions of Abyssinia in Scottish Geographical Magazine volume 59

== Species named in his honour ==
- Acontia buchanani
- Afroarabiella buchanani
- Cigaritis buchanani
- Dattinia buchanani
- Grammodes buchanani
- Nepheronia buquetii buchanani
- Pogononeura buchanani
- Raphia buchanani
- Rhynchina buchanani
- Timora decorata buchanani

=== Birds ===
- Southern grosbeak-canary
- a subspecies of the Fulvous babbler and Vieillot's barbet
