= Brian McGuinness =

British philosopher (1927-2019)

- Born: Bernard Francis McGuinness; 22 October 1927; Wrexham, Wales
- Died: 23 December 2019 (aged 92); Florence, Italy
- Awards: James Tait Black Memorial Prize for biography (1988)

Education
- Education: Balliol College, Oxford (BA, BPhil)
- Academic advisor: R. M. Hare

Philosophical work
- Era: Contemporary philosophy
- Region: Western philosophy
- School: Analytic philosophy
- Institutions: Queen's College, Oxford; NIAS; University of Siena
- Notable students: Tom Sorell
- Main interests: History of early analytic philosophy
- Notable works: English translation of Wittgenstein's Tractatus Logico-Philosophicus (1961, with David Pears)
- Notable ideas: Non-metaphysical interpretation of Wittgenstein's Tractatus

Brian McGuinness (22 October 1927 – 23 December 2019) was a British philosopher and Wittgenstein scholar best known for his translation, with David Pears, of the Tractatus, and for his biography of the first half of Wittgenstein's life.

He was christened with the forenames "Bernard Francis" but changed his name to "Brian" in his youth. He commonly published, and was cited, as B. F. McGuinness.

== Biography ==
He went up to Balliol College in 1945, where he was tutored by R. M. Hare. McGuinness was a Fellow and Tutor at Queen's College in Oxford University from 1953 to 1988, and took a post at the Netherlands Institute for Advanced Study (NIAS). In 1990, he became a professor at the University of Siena, Italy. From 1990 to 1993, he was director of the faculty of philosophy and social sciences of this university. During his time at Queen's, he was an invited speaker at the Oxford Socratic Club, speaking with J. D. Mabbott on "The Problem of Free Will" on 14 November 1955.

== Family ==
His son, Paddy McGuinness, is a former British civil servant who was the Deputy National Security Adviser for Intelligence. His daughter, Catherine McGuinness, is a lawyer with a senior position in the City of London Corporation.

== Select bibliography ==
=== Books authored ===
- Wittgenstein: A Life: Young Ludwig, 1889-1921, Berkeley, California: University of California Press (1988) ISBN 0-520-06451-8. Subsequently published with a new preface as Young Ludwig: Wittgenstein's Life, 1889-1921. New York: Clarendon Press (2005).
- (with Guido Frongia) Wittgenstein: A Bibliographical Guide (1990) ISBN 0-631-13765-3
- Approaches to Wittgenstein: Collected Papers (2002). ISBN 0-415-03261-X

=== Select papers ===
- "The Mysticism of the Tractatus", Philosophical Review, vol. 75 (1966), pp. 305–28.
- "Philosophy of Science in the Tractatus", Revue Internationale de Philosophie, vol. 23 (1969), pp. 155–64.
- "Bertrand Russell and Ludwig Wittgenstein's Notes on Logic", Revue Internationale de Philosophie, vol. 26 (1972), pp. 444–60.
- "The Path to the Tractatus", Revista Portuguesa de Filosofia, vol. 38, no. 1, 1982, pp. 7–12.
- "Wittgenstein and the Vienna Circle", in Synthese, Vol. 64, No. 3 (Sep., 1985), pp. 351-358.

=== Works edited/translated ===
- (with David Pears) Ludwig Wittgenstein: Tractatus Logico-Philosophicus, (1961) ISBN 0-415-25408-6
- Felix Kaufmann: The Infinite in Mathematics: Logico-Mathematical Writings, (1978) ISBN 978-90-277-0847-2
- Hans Hahn: Empiricism, Logic and Mathematics: Philosophical Papers, (1980) ISBN 90-277-1065-1
- Gottlob Frege: Collected Papers on Mathematics, Logic and Philosophy, (1984) ISBN 0-631-12728-3
- Ernst Mach: Principles of the Theory of Heat: Historically and Critically Elucidated, (1986) ISBN 90-277-2206-4
- Unified science. The Vienna monograph series, originally edited by Otto Neurath, now in an English edition. (1987) ISBN 90-277-2484-9
- (with J. Schulte) Friedrich Waismann, Josef Schächter, Moritz Schlick: Ethics and the will: Essays, (1994) ISBN 0-7923-2674-1
- (with Gianluigi Oliveri) The Philosophy of Michael Dummett, (1994) ISBN 0-7923-2804-3
- (with Gianluigi Oliveri) Karl Menger: Reminiscences of the Vienna Circle and the Mathematical Colloquium (1994). ISBN 0-7923-2711-X
- (with George Henrik von Wright) Ludwig Wittgenstein: Cambridge Letters, (1995) ISBN 1-4051-4701-6
  - Wittgenstein in Cambridge: Letters and Documents 1911-1951 (2008) ISBN 9781405147019
- Language, Logic, and Formalization of Knowledge: Coimbra Lecture and Proceedings of a Symposium Held in Siena in September 1997, (1998) ISBN 88-87106-07-X
