= Angus Bethune =

Angus Bethune may refer to:

- Angus Bethune (fur trader) (1783–1858), Canadian fur trader
- Angus Bethune (politician) (1908–2004), Australian politician
- Angus Bethune, the titular character from the 1995 film, Angus
