= Angus Cameron =

Angus Cameron may refer to:

- Angus Cameron (American politician) (1826–1897), American politician, U.S. Senator from Wisconsin
- Angus Cameron (Australian politician) (1847–1896), New South Wales politician
- Angus Cameron (colonial administrator) (1871–1961), British colonial administrator
- Angus Cameron (publisher) (1908–2002), American book editor and publisher
- Angus Cameron (ice hockey) (1921–1993), Canadian ice hockey player
- Angus Cameron (rugby union) (1929–1991), Scottish rugby union player
- Angus Cameron (academic) (1941–1983), Canadian academic
- Angus Cameron (director) (born 1964), British director
- Angus Ewan Cameron (1906–1981), American chemist
