= Angus Fregon =

Australian rules footballer

Personal information
- Full name: Angus Semey Fregon
- Born: 18 July 1880; Omeo, Victoria
- Died: 13 February 1956 (aged 75); Carwarp, Victoria
- Original team: St Kilda Trades

Playing career^{1}
Years	Club	Games (Goals)
1909	St Kilda	1 (0)
- ^{1} Playing statistics correct to the end of 1909.

Angus Semey Fregon (18 July 1880 – 13 February 1956) was an Australian rules footballer who played for the St Kilda Football Club in the Victorian Football League (VFL).
