= Blaise Metreweli =

British civil servant and intelligence officer (born 1977)

Blaise Metreweli CMG

18th Chief of the Secret Intelligence Service
- Incumbent
- Assumed office 1 October 2025
- Prime Minister: Sir Keir Starmer; Andy Burnham
- Preceded by: Sir Richard Moore

Personal details
- Born: Blaise Florence Metreweli; 30 July 1977 (age 49)
- Relatives: Constantine Dobrowolski (grandfather)
- Education: Pembroke College, Cambridge

Blaise Florence Metreweli (born 30 July 1977) is a British intelligence officer and civil servant, currently Chief of the Secret Intelligence Service (MI6), following the retirement of Sir Richard Moore. She is the first female chief of MI6.

== Early life and education ==
Blaise Florence Metreweli was born on 30 July 1977. She, together with her siblings, spent part of her childhood in Hong Kong. She left Cheltenham Ladies' College in 1993, then attended Westminster School, where she took A-Levels in Russian, economics, history, and art. From 1994 to 1995, Metreweli was captain of Westminster School. She then studied anthropology at Pembroke College, Cambridge, graduating with a BA degree from the University of Cambridge in 1998. At Cambridge, alongside future Olympians Sarah Winckless, Francesca Zino, and Alison Mowbray, she was a member of the Cambridge University Women's Boat Club Blue Boat crew that won the 1997 Women's Boat Race against Oxford University. In the same year, Metreweli was part of the rowing crew that won the headship of the 1997 May Bumps for Pembroke College against other Cambridge college crews.

== Family background ==
Metreweli's father, Constantine Metreweli, was born Constantine Dobrowolski, the son of Nazi collaborator Constantine Dobrowolski, in Snovsk in the Chernigov Oblast of the Nazi-occupied Ukrainian Soviet Socialist Republic in 1943. He came to England with his mother, who then married David Metreweli in Yorkshire in 1947. After attending The Latymer School, the University of Cambridge and the University of Oxford, he became a physician and radiologist, and was chair of diagnostic radiology at the Chinese University of Hong Kong. He also trained in the British Army, and did a medical residency in Riyadh from 1982 to 1985. He took the surname Metreweli, which is of Georgian origin, from his stepfather. After the Daily Mail broke the story about Metreweli's paternal grandfather in June 2025, following the announcement that Metreweli was going to be head of MI6, the Foreign Office stated that she had never known him and that her complex Eastern European heritage had "contributed to her commitment to prevent conflict and protect the British public from modern threats from today's hostile states, as the next chief of MI6".

== Career ==
Metreweli joined MI6 in 1999, and "spent much of her early career in the Middle East, at a time when Britain was involved militarily in Afghanistan and Iraq". Since that time, she has worked continuously as an intelligence officer, including director-level roles at MI5. Metreweli's roles in intelligence included senior roles in the Middle East focused on counterterrorism, and have required that she address state threats against a background of complex geopolitical issues, including China's biometric surveillance and cyberattacks by Russia. From 2000 until 2003 Metreweli was Second Secretary for Economic in Dubai, for the Foreign and Commonwealth Office. Around the time that John Sawers became Chief of MI6 in 2009, Metreweli was heading up an MI6 station in the Middle East.

During her career Metreweli has given newspaper interviews: to the Daily Telegraph in 2021 (under the code name "Director K"), and to the Financial Times in 2022 (under the pseudonym "Ada"). As of December 2021 she was on secondment as Head of Hostile States Counterintelligence ("Director K") to MI5. As of June 2025, Metreweli was Director General of Technology and Innovation ("Q") at MI6, At that time, and for the first time, three of the four MI6 directors-general were women.

In June 2025, Metreweli was announced as the next chief of the Secret Intelligence Service (MI6), following Sir Richard Moore when he retired in autumn 2025. She took office on 1 October 2025. There were four candidates for chief of MI6, three from the British intelligence agencies, and Barbara Woodward from the Foreign Office. Metreweli is the first female head of MI6, who is known as "C". As chief of MI6, she is the only publicly named member of the service. She is the third chief from Pembroke College, Cambridge.

In her first public speech as head of SIS, she stated the UK faces a new “age of uncertainty” where the rules of conflict are being rewritten in light of wider Russian aggression. She stated this includes, assassination plots, sabotage, cyber-attacks and information manipulation mean that "the frontline is everywhere".

== Recognition ==
Metreweli was appointed a Companion of the Order of St Michael & St George (CMG) in the King's Birthday Honours for 2024, where she was listed as "Director General, Foreign, Commonwealth and Development Office" with a citation of "For services to British Foreign Policy".

== Personal life ==
Metreweli is fluent in Arabic. She has children, and takes part in masters rowing, competing in the 2024 and 2025 veterans boat races between Oxford and Cambridge.

Government offices
Preceded by Sir Richard Moore	Chief of the Secret Intelligence Service; 2025–present	Incumbent
