= Angus Campbell =

Angus Campbell may refer to:

- Angus Campbell (psychologist) (1910–1980), American social psychologist
- Angus Campbell (ice hockey) (1884–1976), founder of the Northern Ontario Hockey Association (NOHA)
- Angus Campbell MacInnes (1885–1977), Anglican bishop
- Black Angus Campbell (1934–2005), Scottish professional wrestler
- Angus Peter Campbell, Scottish novelist and poet
- Angus Campbell (general), Australian general
- Angus Campbell, member of UK garage group B-15 Project
- Angus Campbell, senior partner and deputy head of studio at Foster and Partners
- Ronald Chetwynd-Hayes, English author who used Angus Campbell as a pen name
