= Noble L. McGinnis =

- Born: August 3, 1829; Madisonville, Tennessee, US
- Died: June 14, 1898 (aged 68); Rapides Parish, Louisiana, US
- Military career
- Allegiance: Confederate States
- Branch: Confederate States Army
- Rank: Colonel
- Commands: 2nd Texas Infantry Regiment
- Battles: American Civil War; Battle of Shiloh; Battle of Iuka; Siege of Vicksburg

Noble L. McGinnis (August 3, 1829–June 14, 1898) was a Confederate veteran of the American Civil War, rising to become Colonel of the 2nd Texas Infantry. He was born in Tennessee, lived briefly in Texas, and for many years was a noted citizen of Rapides Parish, Louisiana.

== Life ==
McGinnis was born in Madisonville, Tennessee. His parents moved to Savannah, Tennessee, during his early life, and to Mississippi in 1846. In 1851 he went to Bastrop, Texas, where he engaged in farming until the outbreak of the Civil War.

When Texas passed the ordinance of Secession he raised a company which became Company H, 2nd Texas Infantry, Confederate States Army. His command was ordered east of the Mississippi in time to take part in the Battle of Shiloh, and afterwards to take part in many engagements, including those at Corinth, Iuka, Farmington and the Siege of Vicksburg. In due course of promotion he became Colonel of the Regiment to which he belonged.

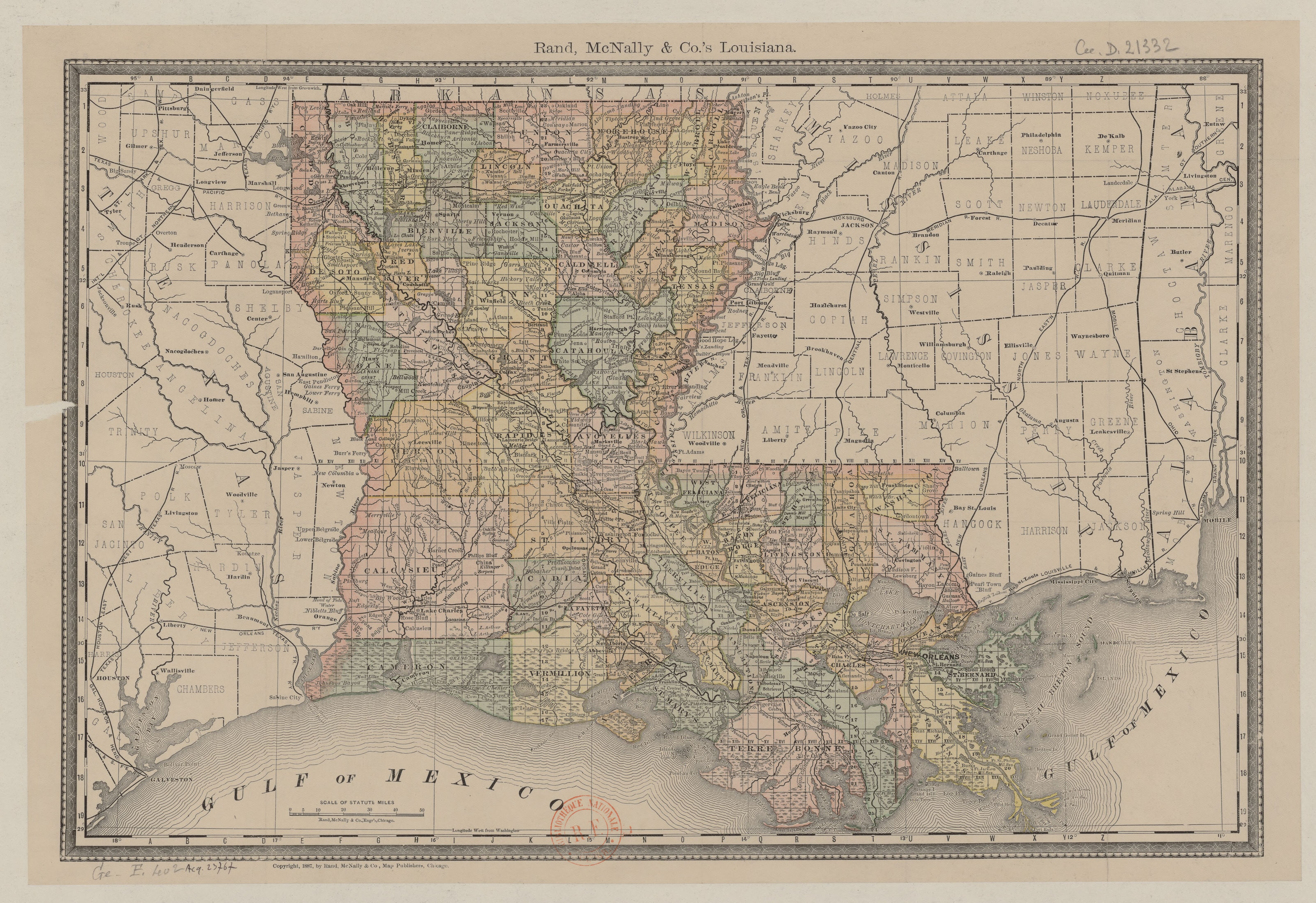
Rand, McNally & Co's Louisiana, 1887

He moved to Rapides Parish, Louisiana, in 1869, where he was for many years a stock-dealer, mail contractor, livery stable man and merchant. He was for some years Mayor of Alexandria.

His last remaining years were quietly spent at his plantation home on Bayou Rapides. About ten years before his death he joined the Methodist church. He died at age 68, surrounded by members of his family, at his home, Eden Plantation, Bayou Rapides, on June 14, 1898.

== Personal life ==
He was twice married, and was survived by his widow and a family of sons and daughters.

== Sources ==
- Miller, Aragorn Storm (May 11, 2011). "McGinnis, Noble L. (1829–1898)". Handbook of Texas (online ed.). Texas State Historical Association.
- "In Memory of Col. N. L. McGinnis". The Weekly Town Talk. Alexandria, Rapides Parish, LA. July 16, 1898. p. 5.
