= Angus W. Kerr =

American politician

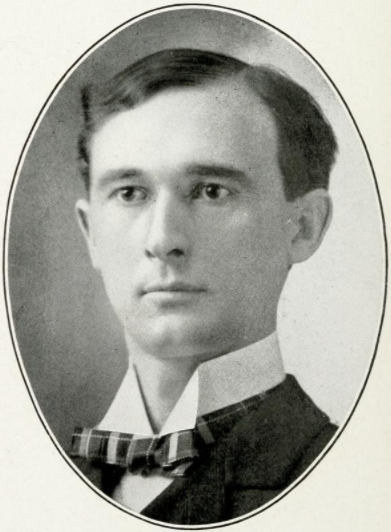

Member of the Michigan House of Representatives from the Houghton County 1st district
- In office January 1, 1899 – January 1, 1903
- Preceded by: Charles Smith
- Succeeded by: William J. Galbraith

Personal details
- Born: May 24, 1873 Ontario, Canada
- Died: May 30, 1927 (aged 54) Springfield, Illinois
- Party: Republican
- Education: University of Michigan Law School

Military service
- Allegiance: United States
- Battles/wars: Spanish American War

Angus Walter Kerr (May 24, 1873 – May 30, 1927) was an American politician and lawyer.

== Early life and education ==
Kerr was born in Ontario, Canada on May 24, 1873. Kerr moved to Lake Linden, Michigan when he was a child. There, he received a high school education. Kerr then attended the University of Michigan Law School from 1891 to 1892.

== Career ==
At the end of his law education, Kerr entered the law office of A. T. Streeter in Calumet, Michigan. Kerr was admitted to the bar on July 12, 1895. Kerr went on to serve as the city attorney of Calumet and as the circuit court commissioner for Houghton County. In 1901, Albert Edward Petermann entered Kerr's law office. He would work there until 1911. Petermann who would go on to serve in the Michigan House of Representatives in 1917. Kerr served in the Spanish American War, in Company D of the 34th Michigan Volunteer Regiment. Then, he was mustered out, where he was assigned recruiting duty. On November 8, 1898, Kerr was elected to the Michigan House of Representatives where he represented the Houghton County 1st district from January 1, 1899, to January 1, 1903. Kerr served as Houghton County prosecuting attorney from 1905 to 1908. Kerr served as chief counsel of the Western Federation of Miners during the Great Copper Country strike.

Kerr later moved to Springfield, Illinois where he served as a member of the judiciary. In Illinois, in 1914, he served as the chief counsel of the United Mine Workers. In this position, he helped the passage of the Illinois Workers' Compensation Act. He had also served as Assistant Attorney General.

== Personal life ==
Angus W. Kerr was married to Katherine. Kathrine survived Angus, and so did two of their children.

== Death ==
On May 30, 1927, Kerr died in Springfield, Illinois, following an operation. At the time of his death, he was serving on the Illinois Crime Commission.
