= Richard Moore (diplomat) =

British diplomat (born 1963)

Sir Richard Moore KCMG
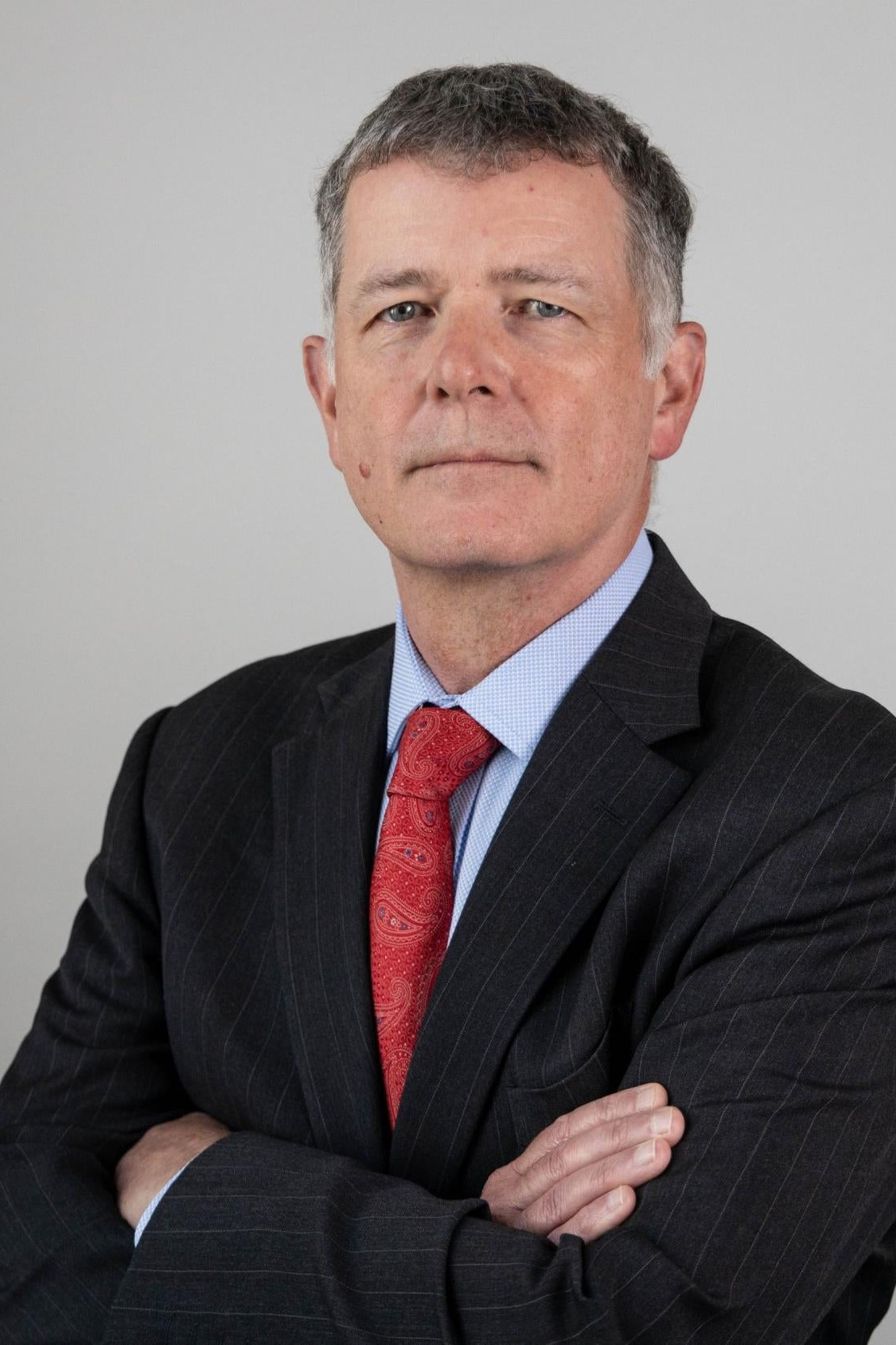

17th Chief of the Secret Intelligence Service
- In office 1 October 2020 – 30 September 2025
- Prime Minister: Boris Johnson; Liz Truss; Rishi Sunak; Keir Starmer
- Preceded by: Sir Alex Younger
- Succeeded by: Blaise Metreweli

Director General, Political at the Foreign, Commonwealth and Development Office
- In office April 2018 – 30 September 2020
- Monarch: Elizabeth II
- Preceded by: Karen Pierce
- Succeeded by: Sir Tim Barrow

British Ambassador to Turkey
- In office January 2014 – December 2017
- Monarch: Elizabeth II
- Preceded by: David Reddaway
- Succeeded by: Dominick Chilcott

Personal details
- Born: 9 May 1963 (age 63) Tripoli, Kingdom of Libya
- Spouse: Maggie Martin (m. 1985)
- Children: 2
- Education: Worcester College, Oxford (BA); Harvard University
- Website: X Profile
- On 16 June 2025, Moore stated that Blaise Metreweli would take over the role of Chief of MI6 from 1 October 2025.

Sir Richard Peter Moore KCMG (born 9 May 1963) is a British intelligence officer, civil servant and diplomat who served as Chief of the Secret Intelligence Service (MI6) from 2020 to 2025. He previously served as Director General, Political at the Foreign, Commonwealth and Development Office from 2018 to 2020 and was the British ambassador to Turkey from 2014 to 2017.

== Education ==
Moore attended St George's College, Weybridge, an independent school in Surrey. Afterwards, he studied philosophy, politics and economics at Worcester College, Oxford, where he graduated as a Bachelor of Arts. He then won a Kennedy Scholarship to study at the Kennedy School of Government in Harvard University. In 2007, he attended the Stanford Executive Program.

== Career ==
Moore, who had a strong interest in international affairs from growing up in both Libya and Russia as a child, applied upon leaving university to be a journalist with the BBC World Service but did not get in. He was then recruited to MI6 as an intelligence officer in 1987. He was posted under diplomatic cover to Vietnam in 1988, Turkey from 1989 to 1992, which included language training, in London as Desk Officer for Iran from 1992 to 1995, Pakistan from 1995 to 1998 and Malaysia from 2001 to 2005.

After moving to the Foreign, Commonwealth and Development Office (FCDO), Moore's first prominent appointment outside of MI6 was as Ambassador of the United Kingdom to Turkey. He held this post from 2014 to 2017. He spent a short period of time on secondment to the Cabinet Office working as Deputy National Security Advisor (Intelligence, Security and Resilience) in 2018. He then became Director-General, Political in the FCDO from 2018 until August 2020. On 29 July 2020, it was announced that Moore would become Chief of the Secret Intelligence Service (MI6) in autumn 2020. He took up this position on 1 October 2020.

Moore was the first member of the British secret service to openly use X (formerly Twitter), when on 2 October 2020 his tweets from his first day as Chief of MI6 made the news for their humorous hashtags and emojis.

On 5 May 2021, Moore announced that MI6 had begun "green spying" to investigate secretly if foreign nations were genuinely keeping to their emission reduction commitments in order to tackle climate change.

In February 2021, Moore apologised publicly to MI6 officers who were dismissed from the agency under the ban on LGBT staff prior to 1991, and called the policy "wrong, unjust and discriminatory".

In July 2023, Moore stated that the Chinese Communist Party (CCP) and CCP general secretary Xi Jinping were "absolutely complicit" in the Russian invasion of Ukraine.

In September 2024, Moore stated that international world order is "under threat in a way we haven’t seen since the Cold War".

Speaking in November 2024, after the US presidential election, Moore suggested that abandoning Ukraine's war would mean "infinitely higher" longer-term costs. He added "If Putin is allowed to succeed in reducing Ukraine to a vassal state, he will not stop there. Our security – British, French, European and transatlantic – will be jeopardised."

On 16 June 2025, Moore stated that Blaise Metreweli would take over the role of Chief of MI6 from 1 October 2025. The Prime Minister's Office announced on 19 June 2025 that Moore would become the new chair of the Kennedy Memorial Trust as of October 2025.

== Personal life ==
Richard Moore was born in Tripoli, Kingdom of Libya, on 9 May 1963. In 1985, he married Margaret ("Maggie") Martin, with whom he has had a son and a daughter.

Moore's grandfather Jack Buckley served as a soldier of the Irish Republican Army from 1916 to 1922 in Cork, Ireland, and was awarded a medal by Sinn Féin for fighting against British rule.

He is fluent in Turkish. Moore was appointed Companion of the Order of St Michael and St George (CMG) in the 2017 New Year Honours for services to UK/Turkey relations and Knight Commander of the Order of St Michael and St George (KCMG) in the 2023 Birthday Honours for services to national security and British foreign policy.

Moore was a member of the Garrick Club, but resigned his membership on 20 March 2024.

Diplomatic posts
Preceded by David Reddaway	British Ambassador to Turkey; 2014–2017	Succeeded by Sir Dominick Chilcott
Preceded by Karen Pierce	Director General for Political Affairs at the Foreign and Commonwealth Office; 2018–2020	Succeeded by Sir Tim Barrow
Government offices
Preceded by Alex Younger	Chief of the Secret Intelligence Service; 2020–2025	Succeeded by Blaise Metreweli
