= Hennesy =

Hennesy is a surname. Notable people with the surname include:

- Carolyn Hennesy (born 1962), American actress and writer
- Dale Hennesy (1926–1981), American art director
- Sean Hennesy, American guitarist
- Tom Hennesy (1923–2011), American actor and stuntman

== See also ==
- Hennessy, cognac brand
- Hennessey (disambiguation)
