= Constantine Dobrowolski =

Ukrainian Nazi collaborator

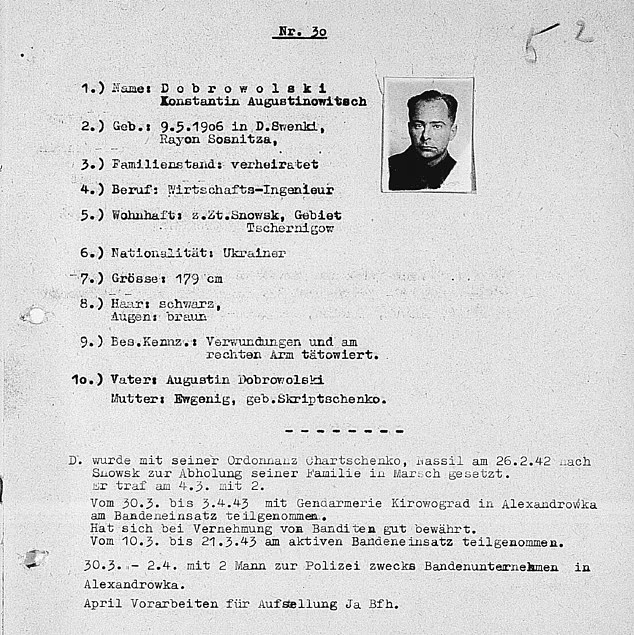
Personnel file (Note: Name: Dobrowolski, Konstantin Augustinowitsch Born: 9.5.1906 in D. Swenki, Sosnitza district Marital status: married Profession: industrial engineer Currently residing: Snowsk, Tschernigow Region Nationality: Ukrainian Height: 179 cm Hair: black Eyes: Brown Distinguishing marks: scars, and tattoo on right arm Father: Augustin Dobrowolski Mother: Ewgenig, born Skriptschenko D. wanted to go to Snowsk with his orderly Chartschenko, Nassil on 26.2.42 to collect his family. He met with two on 4.3. From 30.3 to 3.4.43 took part in anti-”bandit” [that is, Jews and partisans] missions with the Kirowograd gendarmerie in Alexandrowka. Proved reliable in interrogation of bandits. From 10.3 to 21.3.43 took part in anti-bandit actions. From 30.3 to 2.4 joined the police with two men in order to carry out an anti-bandit operation in Alexandrowka. April preparations for installing a Ja Bfh.)

Constantine Dobrowolski (1906 – 1944?) was a Ukrainian Nazi collaborator during World War II. He came to worldwide attention in 2025, when it emerged that he was the paternal grandfather of Blaise Metreweli, the Chief of the Secret Intelligence Service - also known as MI6 - in the United Kingdom.

== Early life ==
Dobrowolski was born in 1906 in Savynky, in Chernigov Governorate of the Russian Empire (now Ukraine), into the Dobrowolski family—a Russian noble family of Polish descent (szlachta). Dobrowolski's father, Augustin, owned an estate of more than 600 hectares where he raised cattle and poultry. The family spent winters in Kiev. Dobrowolski was born when his father was about sixty and was possibly the illegitimate son of a peasant woman whom the widowed Augustin married in 1915. After the October Revolution of 1917, the family fled to Kiev and their country estate was seized by local peasants.

== Defection and Nazi collaboration ==
Dobrowolski gave two different accounts of his past; one to the Red Army and a later one to the Germans after his defection. In an account given to the Red Army and documented in his army record in the 1930s, he had spent several years working at various jobs in the Moscow region before joining the 30th artillery regiment in Dnepropetrovsk in Ukraine in 1927. Invalided out two years later, he became head of the special department at the Baranov Plant in Zaporozhye. He rejoined the army in 1935. After defecting to the Germans, he claimed in a 1942 account that his family had been killed by the Bolsheviks, that he had spent years on the run in Moscow with a false identity before being arrested and serving ten years in a prison camp in Siberia for anti-Soviet agitation and antisemitism, and had volunteered for the front when Germany invaded the Soviet Union in 1941. Historian Igor Petrov suggests that the second account was fabricated to convince the Germans that he had reason to oppose the Soviets and could therefore be trusted.

By 1941, Dobrowolski had become a captain in the artillery. When Germany invaded the Soviet Union in June 1941, his unit was sent to the Eastern Front in Ukraine, where he was reported as missing in action in August 1941. Following his surrender to German forces, he became a Nazi collaborator, known as Agent 30 to the Wehrmacht. His activities as a collaborator over the next two years are recorded in a file running to hundreds of pages in the German Federal Military Archive in Freiburg im Breisgau. Documents include letters which he signed with "Heil Hitler" and claimed to have taken part in the extermination of Jews. Having returned to his home district of Sosnytsia, he organised a 300-strong Ukrainian police unit which assisted in rounding up and killing Jews and Ukrainian partisans. He rose to become a local intelligence chief for the Nazis in Chernigov, having first collaborated with the Hiwi, before joining the Wehrmacht's secret military police Geheime Feldpolizei in July 1942. He was dubbed "the "Butcher" (Note: Igor Petrov queries this, and says that words used by partisans to describe Dobrolowski are best translated as "executioner", "cannibal", and "bloodsucker".) by partisans, and there are accounts of him sharing in loot taken from Holocaust victims and condoning the rape of women prisoners. The Soviets offered a 50,000-ruble bounty—£200,000 today—on Dobrowolski, calling him "the worst enemy of the Ukrainian people." The last entry in the file is in August 1943, as the Soviet army advanced on the region.

Petrov discovered further documents in which Dobrowolski was listed in early 1944 in the 69th Cossack battalion in the newly created 8th Cavalry Brigade of the Wehrmacht (part of I Cavalry Corps). Petrov concluded that it was possible he was killed during the Soviet advance in Belarus in June 1944 or in Warsaw, since his name was not amongst members of the battalion who received awards for taking part in the suppression of the Warsaw Uprising from August to October 1944. No further trace of him was found in German documents.

== Legacy ==
Dobrowolski's last known whereabouts date to 1943. A top-secret Soviet KGB wanted list from 1969, found by historians Igor Petrov and Oleg Beida in the National Archives of Estonia in 2025, stated that he had escaped with the retreating Germans in September 1943, and listed him as possibly still alive. In 1943, Dobrowolski obtained a safe passage to Germany for his wife Varvara and baby son Constantine; they reached England after the war. Varvara remarried in Yorkshire and Constantine Dobrowolski junior took the name of his stepfather, David Metreweli, and had a career as a radiologist. One of his children, Blaise Metreweli, born in 1977, joined MI6 in 1999 after graduating from the University of Cambridge.

Following the announcement in June 2025 of Metreweli's appointment as Chief of the Secret Intelligence Service, the British newspaper, the Daily Mail disclosed her connection to Dobrowolski and published details of his role as a Nazi collaborator, which were contained in his file in the Freiburg archives. A spokesperson for the Foreign Office pointed out in response that Metreweli had never known her grandfather, and that her complex Eastern European heritage had "contributed to her commitment to prevent conflict and protect the British public from modern threats from today's hostile states, as the next chief of MI6".

The 1969 KGB wanted list identified Dobrowolski as having had three wives before Varvara. Two of them were still alive at that time and living in the Soviet Union; one had a son and one had a son and a daughter.
