= Gussie =

Gussie is occasionally a given name in its own right, but is much more frequently a shortened version (hypocorism) of Chreigusta, Augustus, Augusta, Gustave, Gustavo, August, Augustine, Augusten, Augustina, Angus, Fergus, Argus, Gusten, Gus, and others.

Gussie or Gussy may refer to:

== Men ==
- Edward Augustus Bowles (1865–1954), British horticulturalist, botanist and writer
- Gussie Busch (1899–1989), American brewing magnate
- Gussie Clarke (born 1953), Jamaican reggae music producer
- Gussie Davis (1863–1899), African-American songwriter
- Gussie Mueller (1890–1965), American jazz clarinetist
- Gussie Ryan (born 1966), Irish retired hurler

== Women ==
- Augusta Clark (1932–2013), African-American librarian, lawyer and politician
- Caroline Augusta "Gussie" Clowry (1845–1897), pen name G. Estabrook, composer and singer
- Gussy Holl (1888–1966), German actress and singer
- Gussy or Gussie Moran (1923–2013), American tennis player
- Gussie Nell Davis (1909–1993), American teacher who founded the Kilgore College Rangerettes

== Fictional characters ==
- Gussie Fink-Nottle, in the Jeeves novels of British comic writer P. G. Wodehouse
- Gussie Carnegie, in Merrily We Roll Along (musical) by Stephen Sondheim

== See also ==
- Gussie Telfair, a merchant steamship built in 1862, formerly USS Gertrude
- Gus (disambiguation)
