= Angus Graham (businessman) =

Scottish businessperson (1937-2023)

- Born: February 9, 1937; London, United Kingdom
- Died: November 2, 2023 (aged 86)
- Occupation: Businessperson
- Known for: Founded the community funded Thomas Graham Library
- Spouse: Catherine Sword
- Children: 2

Angus John Malise Graham (9 February 1937 – 2 November 2023) was a Scottish businessperson who founded the Thomas Graham Library in Strathblane.

== Early life and education ==
Born in London, Angus Graham was the son of John Graham, a general practitioner, and Yvonne Dubois from a Swiss watchmaking family. He spent his formative years in Seaford, East Sussex and later inherited the Ballewan estate in Scotland, a property long held by his family.

Graham was educated at Charterhouse School. He pursued a career in accountancy after failing to gain admission to Oxford University.

== Career ==
In the late 1960s, Graham worked for Koracorp, a textile company, in Paris. In 1976, he joined Inver House Distillers, which was then underperforming, and by 1988 he led a management buyout, steering the company towards specializing in single malt whiskies. The company was eventually sold to Pacific Spirits in 2001.

Graham contributed to community initiatives, including a large-scale tree planting project and a hydro-electric scheme proposal. He played a major role in establishing a £1 million community hub in Strathblane, which included a new library funded by his donations and local contributions.

== Personal life ==
Graham was married to Catherine Sword, and they had two children.
