= Inji (name) =

Inji is an Arabic given name mostly popular in Egypt. It is derived from the Turkish name İnci meaning "pearl." This name has many variants, such as Engy, Ingy, Engi, or even Angie (different from the Greek name meaning Angel). Notable people with the name include:

- Engy Wegdan (1983-), Egyptian actress
- Ingy Hamdy (1986-), Egyptian volley-ball player
- Ingy Mubiayi (1973-), Egyptian-Italian writer
- Inji (singer) (born 2001), Turkish singer-songwriter
- Inji Aflatoun (1924–1989), Egyptian painter and activist
- Inji Hanim (died 1890), Egyptian wife of Sa'id Pasha

== See also ==
- Inji, a village in North Khorasan, Iran
- Enge, a quarter in District 2 of Zürich, Switzerland.
