= Angie Miller =

Angie or Angela Miller may refer to:

- Angie Miller (American singer) (born 1994), American singer-songwriter and American Idol contestant
- Angie Miller (British singer), active in the 1970s
- Angela Miller (volleyball), American volleyball player
- Angela Miller, a character in Resident Evil: Degeneration
