= Angela Salvagno =

American bodybuilder and adult model (born 1976)

- professional bodybuilder

Personal info
- Born: January 13, 1976 (age 49); Willows, California, U.S.

Best statistics
- Height: 5 ft 3 in (1.60 m)
- Weight: 150 lb (68 kg)

Professional (Pro) career
- Pro-debut: IFBB Pro Bodybuilding Weekly Championships; 2009
- Best win: NPC USA Championship; 2009

Angela Salvagno (born January 13, 1976) is an American IFBB professional female bodybuilder.

== Personal life ==
Salvagno was born in Willows, California, on January 13, 1976, and raised in Orland, California. She is of Italian, German and Native American descent. Currently, she lives in southern Florida. She excelled at many sports growing up including baseball and earned a black belt in Tae Kwon Do. She is a fitness model. She is also currently involved in product design & manufacturing for a natural product company.

== Bodybuilding career ==
Salvagno started weight training at the age of 16 and competed in her first show 7 years later. Her most notable accomplishment to date is winning the light-heavyweight class and the overall at the 2009 NPC USA Championship earning her pro status.

=== Contest history ===
- 1999 Contra Costa – 2nd (MW)
- 1999 Sacramento – 1st (HW & overall)
- 2000 Contra Costa – 2nd (HW)
- 2000 California – 2nd (HW)
- 2001 NPC USA Championship – 5th (MW)
- 2001 NPC Nationals – 16th (HW)
- 2001 Ironman – 1st (HW & overall)
- 2002 NPC Nationals – 6th (MW)
- 2003 NPC Nationals – 8th (MW)
- 2004 NPC Nationals – 9th (LHW)
- 2005 NPC USA Championship – 3rd (LHW)
- 2006 NPC USA Championship – 1st (LHW)
- 2006 NPC Nationals – 4th (LHW)
- 2007 NPC USA Championships – 1st (LHW)
- 2009 NPC USA Championship – 1st (LHW & overall winner)
- 2009 IFBB Tampa Pro – 6th
- 2011 IFBB Tampa Pro – 6th
- 2011 IFBB Europa Battle of Champions – 5th
- 2015 IFBB Europa physique division – 11th
- 2018 IFBB Tampa Pro - 11th
