= Rosamond McGuinness =

Rosamond 'Corky' McGuinness (4 December 1929 – 16 March 2012, London) was an American music historian.

McGuinness was born in Bridgeport, Connecticut. She came from a Jewish family, her father, Howard Cohan being a dentist, and her mother Adelaide Zeigler being a music teacher. In 1947 she attended Vassar College where she studied music. However the prospects of a career as a concert pianist disappeared after an eye disease left her partially blind in 1950.

McGuiness was a lecturer at Royal Holloway College from 1969 and became a Professor of Music History there. McGuiness studied the economic and business history of English music and published the Register of Musical Data in London Newspapers.

She retired in 1995. In February 1991 she made an extended appearance on the Channel 4 discussion programme After Dark alongside Charlotte Davis Kasl and Father Michael Seed, among others.

She married twice, first to Brian McGuinness, the philosopher and later to George Biddlecombe.

== Publications ==
- 1971 English Court Odes, 1660-1820 Oxford: Oxford University Press
