= National Security Adviser (United Kingdom) =

Official in the British government

- Royal Arms of His Majesty's Government

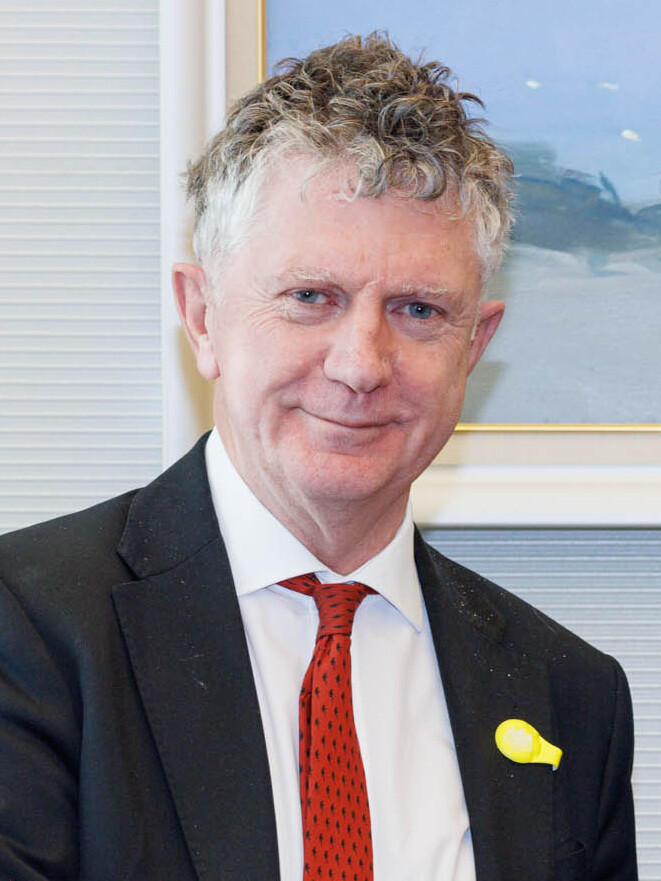
- Incumbent; Jonathan Powell since 2 December 2024
- National Security Secretariat; Cabinet Office
- Reports to: Prime Minister; Chancellor of the Duchy of Lancaster
- Nominator: Prime Minister
- Appointer: The King (on the advice of the Prime Minister)
- Term length: At His Majesty's pleasure
- Formation: 2010
- First holder: Sir Peter Ricketts
- Deputy: Deputy National Security Adviser (DNSA)

The National Security Adviser (NSA) is a senior official in the Cabinet Office, based in Whitehall, who serves as the principal adviser to the prime minister of the United Kingdom and Cabinet of the United Kingdom on all national security issues. The NSA post was created in May 2010 as part of the reforms that also saw the creation of the National Security Council. There have been six holders of the office to date, two of whom served more than three years in the post. Until 2024, the NSA acted as Secretary to the National Security Council, which is chaired by the Prime Minister, and head of the National Security Secretariat in the Cabinet Office. Each National Security Adviser has been supported by at least two Deputy National Security Advisers.

== Responsibilities ==
The National Security Adviser is the principal official adviser to the Prime Minister and Cabinet on national security matters. These responsibilities have included:

- Providing advice to the Prime Minister and the Cabinet on national security. This includes strategy, policy, capability and civil contingencies.
- Leadership to and management of the national security teams in the Cabinet Office.
- Bringing together the wider national security community across Whitehall and the UK Government's overseas network.
- Cultivating and maintaining a network of international stakeholders as well as contacts with relevant counterparts, businesses, industry and civil society groups.

== List of national security advisers ==
#	Name	Term start	Term end	Term length	Prime Minister(s) served	Party	Ref
1	Sir Peter Ricketts	12 May 2010	23 January 2012	1 year and 257 days	David Cameron	Conservative	
2	Sir Kim Darroch	23 January 2012	7 September 2015	3 years and 228 days	David Cameron	Conservative	
3	Sir Mark Lyall Grant	7 September 2015	13 April 2017	1 year and 219 days	David Cameron	Conservative	
3	Sir Mark Lyall Grant	7 September 2015	13 April 2017	1 year and 219 days	Theresa May	Conservative	
4	Sir Mark Sedwill	13 April 2017	16 September 2020	3 years and 157 days	Theresa May	Conservative	
4	Sir Mark Sedwill	13 April 2017	16 September 2020	3 years and 157 days	Boris Johnson	Conservative	
—	David Quarrey (acting)	17 September 2020	25 March 2021	190 days	Boris Johnson	Conservative	
5	Sir Stephen Lovegrove	24 March 2021	13 September 2022	1 year and 174 days	Boris Johnson	Conservative	
6	Sir Tim Barrow	14 September 2022	29 November 2024	4 years and 70 days	Liz Truss	Conservative	
6	Sir Tim Barrow	14 September 2022	29 November 2024	4 years and 70 days	Rishi Sunak	Conservative	
6	Sir Tim Barrow	14 September 2022	29 November 2024	4 years and 70 days	Keir Starmer	Labour	
7	Jonathan Powell	2 December 2024	Incumbent	1 year and 356 days	Keir Starmer	Labour	
7	Jonathan Powell	2 December 2024	Incumbent	1 year and 356 days	Andy Burnham	Labour	

== List of deputy national security advisers ==
Since the creation of the position of National Security Adviser, there have always been at least two deputy national security advisers.

1. Julian Miller (2010–2015)
2. Olly Robbins (2010–2014)
3. Hugh Powell (2013–2016)
4. Paddy McGuinness (2014–2018) (Intelligence, Security and Resilience)
5. Gwyn Jenkins (2015–2017) (Conflict, Stability and Defence)
6. Christian Turner (2017–2019) (International Affairs)
7. Richard Moore (2018) (Intelligence, Security and Resilience)
8. Madeleine Alessandri (2018–2020) (National Resilience and Security)
9. David Quarrey (2019–2022) (International Affairs)
10. Beth Sizeland (2020–2021) (National Resilience and Security)
11. Alex Ellis (2020–2021) (Integrated Review on diplomacy, development and defence)
12. Andrew McCosh (2021–2022) (Technology)
13. Sarah MacIntosh (2022–2024) (Foreign Affairs)
14. Matt Collins (2022–present) (Intelligence, Defence and Security)
15. Barbara Woodward (2025–present) (International Affairs)
