= McGinniss =

McGinniss is a surname. Notable people with the surname include:

- Brother Michael McGinniss, a De La Salle Christian Brother and academic
- Colin McGinniss, American member of punk rock band None More Black
- Joe McGinniss, American writer (1942–2014)
- Joe McGinniss Jr., American novelist (born 1970)
- Will McGinniss, American member of the Christian rock band Audio Adrenaline
