= Conflict, Stability and Security Fund =

The British Government created the Conflict, Stability and Security Fund (CSSF) on 1 April 2015, replacing the previous Conflict (Prevention) Pool. It was a pool of money, over £1 billion per year, for tackling conflict and instability overseas. Roughly half of the fund was categorised as government official development assistance (ODA).

In 2023, the CSSF was in the process of merging with other funds to form the new UK Integrated Security Fund (UKISF), which was established on 1 April 2024.

== Governance and purpose ==
The CSSF was overseen by the National Security Council (NSC), whereas the previous Conflict Pool had been jointly controlled by the Department for International Development, the Ministry of Defence, and the Foreign and Commonwealth Office. The National Security Adviser was the Senior Responsible Officer for the CSSF.

The CSSF supports delivery of the UK's Building Stability Overseas Strategy and the National Security Strategy and Strategic Defence and Security Review. The CSSF builds on the framework of the Conflict Pool by bringing together existing cross-departmental expertise and resources from across government. The CSSF funds a broader range of activities to help prevent conflict that affects vulnerable people in the world's poorest countries, and tackle threats to British security and interests from instability overseas. This will include actions the UK delivers directly or through third parties to help prevent conflict and instability, and support post-conflict reconciliation.

Priorities for the Fund are set by the Government's National Security Council, to ensure a stronger cross-departmental approach that draws on the synergy of defence, diplomacy, developmental assistance, security and intelligence. It was designed to enable the British Government to tackle the root causes of conflict abroad with various national and regional programmes including, developing human rights training, strengthening local police and judiciaries, and facilitating political reconciliation and local peace processes.

== History ==
When the fund was created, the majority of its funding, £823 million out of £1,033 million, was transferred from the Department for International Development budget to the fund, £739 million of which was then administered by the Foreign and Commonwealth Office and £42 million by the Ministry of Defence. The 2015 UK Aid policy stated that the CSSF would be increased to £1.3 billion by 2019/20. The funds available through the previous Conflict Pool were £180 million in 2014/15, so there has been a very substantial funding increase in this area with the creation of the CSSF.

In 2016 Sir Mark Lyall Grant, National Security Adviser, stated the three countries on which most was spent were Afghanistan (£90 million), Syria (£60 million) and Somalia (£32 million), and that the fund had projects in more than 40 countries. A major spending area was related to the Syrian Civil War, including hiring private contractors to deliver "strategic communications and media operations support to the Syrian moderate armed opposition" – described as essentially running the "Free Syrian Army press office". The Stabilisation Unit interdepartmental agency was funded by the CSSF.

The fund's first annual report was published in July 2017, under the auspices of the new National Security Adviser, Mark Sedwill, covering the financial year 2016/17. It stated that the five largest CSSF country programmes out of 70 were: Afghanistan (£90 million), Syria (£64 million), Somalia (£33.5 million), Jordan (£25.3 million) and Lebanon (£24 million). The spending in Jordan and Lebanon was largely related to the influx of refugees from the Syrian Civil War. The report states that more detail will be published during the following financial year.

The budget for the 2020/21 financial year was £1.37 billion. The four largest line-items, which exceeded half of the budget, were Peacekeeping (£388 million), Middle East and North Africa (£183 million), South Asia (£103 million) and MOD Afghan Security (£100 million).

== 2017 Committee on the National Security Strategy inquiry ==
The Joint Committee on the National Security Strategy launched an inquiry examining the Conflict, Stability and Security Fund in May 2016. On 2 November 2016 Lord McConnell criticised the fact there was no up-to-date public strategy for the fund, as the 2011 Building Stability Overseas Strategy has never been updated. In November 2016 the Joint Committee on the National Security Strategy inquiry asked Sir Mark Lyall Grant, the Prime Minister’s National Security Adviser, to disclose details of the fund’s spending. This followed concern in the media that the fund was causing more of the UK aid budget to be spent on defence and foreign policy objectives.

The inquiry issued its report on 6 February 2017. The government had refused to disclose which countries were receiving money under the CSSF, and only a small number of individual projects were disclosed. The government stated that some projects must remain secret for security reasons. The committee reported that the fund had opaque objectives and achievements, and lacked accountability. The committee reported that "There is a risk that the CSSF is being used as a 'slush fund' for projects that may be worthy, but which do not collectively meet the needs of UK national security". There was particular criticism of the Foreign and Commonwealth Office, both for its lack of procurement expertise and outdated understanding of the political causes of armed conflict. The committee concluded it could not "provide parliamentary accountability for taxpayers’ money spent via the CSSF." It recommended a single Cabinet Office minister should be responsible for the fund's spending.

In 2017 the Independent Commission for Aid Impact started a review of the CSSF, with the final report due in Spring 2018.

== 2023 Committee on the National Security Strategy report ==
In 2023, the Joint Committee on the National Security Strategy produced a report on the CSSF. They noted that reductions to the UK's Official Development Assistance budget had shifted CSSF spending away from peacebuilding and conflict prevention, and reducing the priority of development work. They were concerned this would hinder the ability to anticipate conflict, prevent escalation, and respond effectively to areas of known instability across the world. The CSSF budged had fallen to £889 million in 2022/2023.

== See also ==
- Conscience: Taxes for Peace not War
- Global Justice Now
- Reprieve (organisation)
- Westminster Foundation for Democracy
