= Conscience: Taxes for Peace not War =

British advocacy group

- Formation: 1979; 47 years ago
- Type: Non-governmental organization
- Purpose: Conscientious objection to military taxation
- Headquarters: London, United Kingdom
- Website: www.conscienceonline.org.uk
- Formerly called: The Peace Tax Campaign, Conscience The Peace Tax Campaign

Conscience: Taxes for Peace Not War is an advocacy group based in the United Kingdom. Conscience's primary aim is to change British tax law to allow conscientious objectors to military taxation to redirect the military portion of their taxes to a fund designed for international peacebuilding, conflict management, conflict prevention and other non-violent interventions. Quakers, Mennonites, Baháʼís, Buddhists, Jehovah's Witnesses, Seventh Day Adventists and Haredim Jews all practice conscientious objection for reasons of faith. Many other individuals do so for reasons of conscience, some believing there is little moral difference between actually firing lethal weapons and paying someone else to do so. Conscience believes that to deny these individuals the right to redirect the military portion of their taxes is to deny them freedom of thought, conscience, and religion as enshrined in various national and international human rights laws.

Conscience has also campaigned around the management, transparency and utilisation of the Conflict, Stability and Security Fund (formerly the Conflict Pool), a UK government fund which ‘seeks to reduce the impact of conflict and instability around the world’ mainly via non-military means.

During the Centenary of the Military Service Act, which was the first in the world to enshrine the right to conscientious objection in law, the organisation introduced a 'Taxes for Peace' bill to the British Parliament, which seeks to extend the 100 year old conscience clause into the tax system.

== History ==
=== The Peace Tax Campaign ===
Conscience began as The Peace Tax Campaign in 1979. A Cornish Quaker, Stanley Keeble sought to establish the legal right of conscientious objection to military taxation, suggesting that the portion of tax that was used to fund the military should instead be used for peaceful purposes. He initially sent out a leaflet announcing the beginning of the Peace Tax Campaign, and began a campaign of letter writing, lectures and organising meetings to bring together those with similar ideas. People were actively encouraged to write to their MPs to change the law, something Conscience continues to do today. A letter to the Guardian newspaper signed by both MPs and religious leaders brought the campaign to national attention in 1981, leading to over 3,000 supporters and 50 local co-ordinators to join the campaign. In 1981 Alex Lyon MP put forward an amendment to the Finance Bill to allow those with a "conscientious objection to paying for expenditure on defence" to pay the military part of their taxes to the then Ministry of Overseas Development. This, though unsuccessful, was the first attempt to enable such legislation in the UK. Since then the campaign have submitted a number of Early Day Motions and 10 Minute Rule Bills.

=== Conscience: The Peace Tax Campaign ===
The Peace Tax Campaign changed its name to "Conscience: The Peace Tax Campaign" in 1990. It campaigned for a Parliamentary Bill in 1994 "to allow those who have a conscientious objection to the use of their taxes for military purposes to register their objection, and to divert this portion of their taxes into a non-military fund, to be used for the promotion of international understanding, study of the causes and resolution of conflict". The bill was supported by 45 Members of Parliament.

Conscience also helped form Conscience and Peace Tax International (CPTI) who work with organisations from other countries to campaign for a Peace Tax. This includes the UN where it now has consultative status.

Conscience was one of the founders of the Peace & Security Liaison Group (PSLG) in 2004. PSLG brought together other non-governmental organisations with similar aims, think-tanks, academics, and UK government officials to discuss international peace and security and sought to allow meetings between these groups and the UK Government. PSLG aimed to deliver a more consistent approach to the formulation and implementation of policies which promote global peace and security. The PSLG roundtable meetings finished in 2010.

=== Shelia McKechnie Foundation Award ===
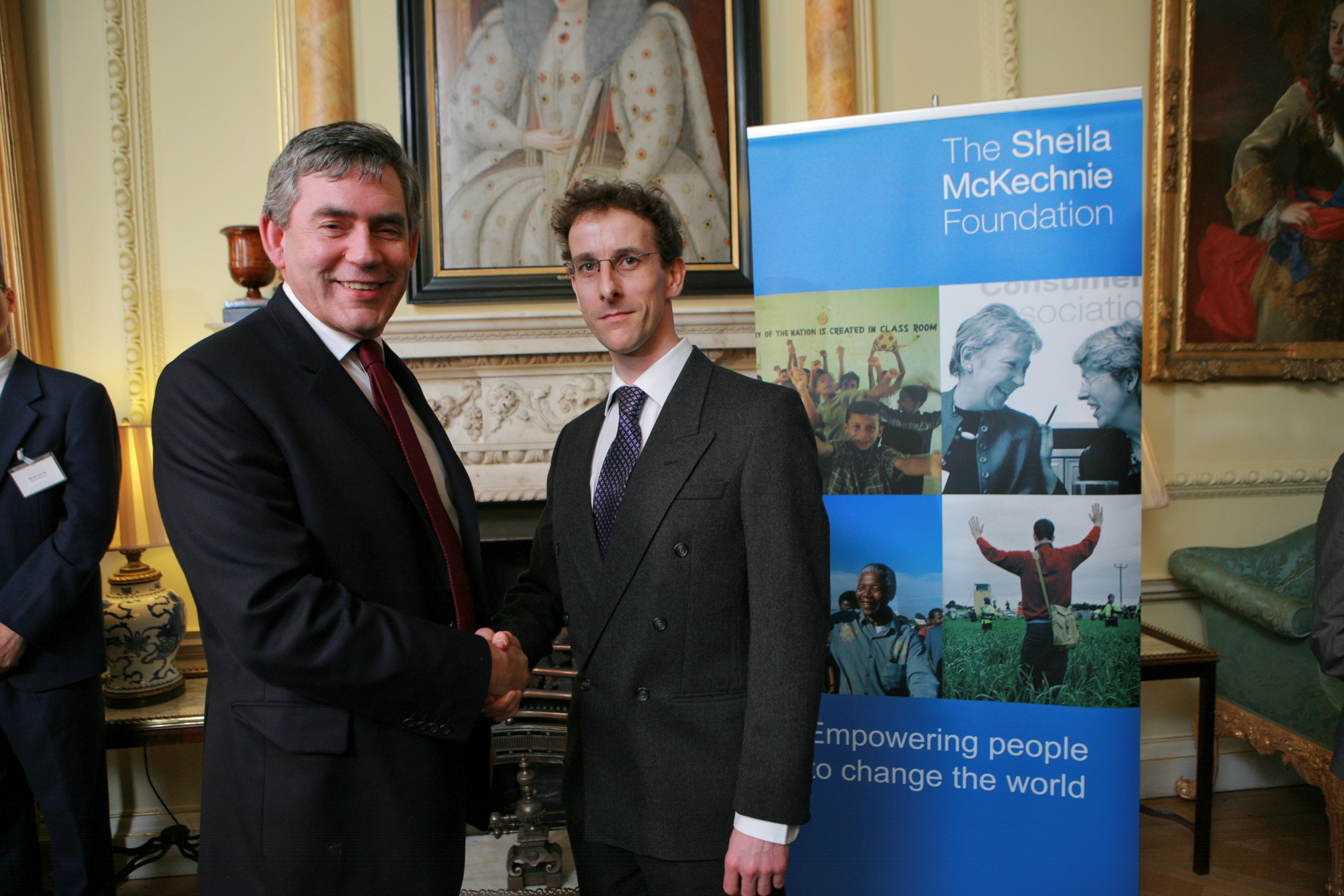
Conscience's Nick Wilson receives Shelia McKechnie Foundation Conflict Resolution Campaign Award from Prime Minister Gordon Brown at 10 Downing Street, July 2008

In 2008 Conscience was recognised for its campaigning work by the Shelia McKechnie Foundation (SMK) Conflict Resolution Award. The SMK Foundation Awards are presented to those who demonstrate commitment and effectiveness at tackling the root causes of injustice and inequality, of which conflict is one. Conscience was singled out for the award because of its work campaigning for the right of conscientious objection to be recognised in British tax law, and its promotion of peaceful methods of conflict resolution as an alternative to warfare. The award was presented by then Labour Prime Minister Gordon Brown at 10 Downing Street Other winners have included the White Ribbon Campaign, and Action on South Africa (ACTSA).

=== Conscience: Taxes For Peace Not War ===
Conscience changed its name once again to Conscience: Taxes for Peace not War in 2009. The organisation moved towards campaigning for national security based upon soft (persuasive cultural), rather than hard (violent or economic), power. However, they still campaign for the legal right of conscientious objectors to have the part of their taxes that go on the military instead be spent on non-military aid.

Conscience was featured alongside Nelson Mandela, Caroline Lucas and Taha Muhammad Ali in an issue of The Spokesman, the journal of the Bertrand Russell Peace Foundation in 2014

== Controversies ==
In 2005, one of Conscience's supporters, then Conservative Shadow Chancellor Oliver Letwin was criticised for his views. Letwin at the time was listed as a supporter on Conscience's website along with over 75 other Members of Parliament. He received criticism from Conservative Lord Tebbit who said "The idea that we can pick and choose where our taxes are spent is just plain silly". Criticism also came from Labour's then deputy election co-ordinator, Fraser Kemp who said "For Oliver Letwin to consider something that could threaten the defence of the realm is unbelievable".

== Campaigning activity ==
=== Conflict Pool ===
The Conflict Pool was set up in 2001 as a way to fund conflict prevention and peacebuilding projects around the world. The fund had a budget of £300 million and is shared between the Department for International Development, the Foreign and Commonwealth Office and the Ministry of Defence. The three governmental departments bid for money from the Conflict Pool to support various projects around the world.

The Conflict Pool has received criticism, including from the Independent Commission for Aid Impact (ICAI), who published a critical report in 2012. Around the time this report was published, Conscience began campaigning around the Conflict Pool. Although the Conflict Pool is not the Peace Tax that Conscience has been campaigning for, they have said in the past that "it is the closest such entity created by government so far". Conscience lobbies for an increase in transparency in how the fund is being used, and to stop further militarisation in order to keep the Pool being used for non-military security projects. To this end a 2014 Early Day Motion was submitted to Parliament, which was supported by members of the Labour party, Green Party, Plaid Cymru, and the Social Democratic and Labour party. In response to the criticisms found in the ICAI report, the Conflict Pool was replaced by the Conflict Stability and Security Fund (CSSF) in April 2015, with the recommendations in the ICAI report forming the model for the new fund.

The funds available through the Conflict Pool were £180 million in 2014/15.

=== Conflict, Stability and Security Fund ===
The British Government provided more than £1 billion in 2015-16 for the new Conflict, Stability and Security Fund (CSSF). The CSSF builds on the framework of the Conflict Pool by bringing together existing cross-departmental expertise and resources from across government. The CSSF funds a broader range of activities to help prevent conflict that affects vulnerable people in the world's poorest countries, and tackle threats to British security and interests from instability overseas. This will include actions the UK delivers directly or through third parties to help prevent conflict and instability, and support post-conflict reconciliation.

Priorities for the Fund are set by the Government's National Security Council, to ensure a stronger cross-departmental approach that draws on the synergy of defence, diplomacy, developmental assistance, security and intelligence. It is designed to enable the British Government to tackle the root causes of conflict abroad with various national and regional programmes including, developing human rights training, strengthening local police and judiciaries, and facilitating political reconciliation and local peace processes.

=== Taxes for Peace Bill ===
Conscientious objectors to military taxation believe that under the UK's current tax system people are not able to express their freedom of thought, conscience, or religion as they are forced into paying for war and preparation for war. Because modern wars are no longer fought with conscripted armies, but with highly trained professional armies using high-tech weapons, paid for with taxes, and given Conscience's roots in the conscientious objection movement, the organisation believes that individuals are effectively conscripted into warfare through their tax money being used for military activity. Conscience campaigns for an update in UK law, so that people with a conscientious objection to war can have the part of their income taxes currently spent on military activity – approximately 6% – spent on peacebuilding and conflict prevention instead.

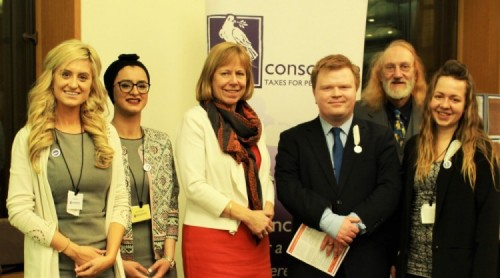
Ruth Cadbury MP with the Conscience team at the launch of the Taxes for Peace Bill, 2 March 2016

Conscience has campaigned for decades to build a Parliamentary coalition to support a 'Taxes for Peace Bill’ that would enable income tax payers to indicate their conscientious objection to military taxation and have that portion of their taxes currently spent on financing the Ministry of Defence redirected towards non-military forms of security. On 2 March 2016, a century to the day after the introduction of the Military Service Act, Conscience launched the Taxes for Peace Bill in the British Parliament. At the launch its sponsor Ruth Cadbury MP, speaking about the Trident nuclear weapons the UK currently operates, described how a weapon that:

'... is specifically designed to end human life on a massive scale and destabilise our fragile environment has no place in any country which values its humanity. It's a waste of our labourers’ talent, who should be building the next generation of homes, and a waste of the ingenuity of our engineers who should be building the next generation of renewable energy production.'

The Taxes for Peace Bill was put forward for parliamentary debate as a 10 Minute Rule Bill by Ruth Cadbury MP on 19 July 2016 where it received unanimous support. It was scheduled for a second reading on 12 December 2016 but this has been deferred to 24 March 2017.

== Publications ==
- Non-military security solutions: peacebuilding alternatives to military responses (PDF) (Report). July 2013.
- Engaging Afghanistan (PDF) (Report). April 2011.

== See also ==
- Conscientious objection to military taxation
- Conscientious objector
- Peacebuilding
- Conflict resolution
- Nation-building
- Peacemaking
- Peacekeeping
- State-building
- Environmental peacebuilding
- Religion and peacebuilding
- Peace and conflict studies
- War Studies
