= CSSF =

CSSF may refer to:

- Commission de Surveillance du Secteur Financier, Luxembourg
- Conflict, Stability and Security Fund, United Kingdom
- Felician Sisters (officially the Congregation of Sisters of St. Felix of Cantalice Third Order Regular of St. Francis of Assisi)
- China School Sport Federation, a member of the International School Sport Federation
