= Dover House =

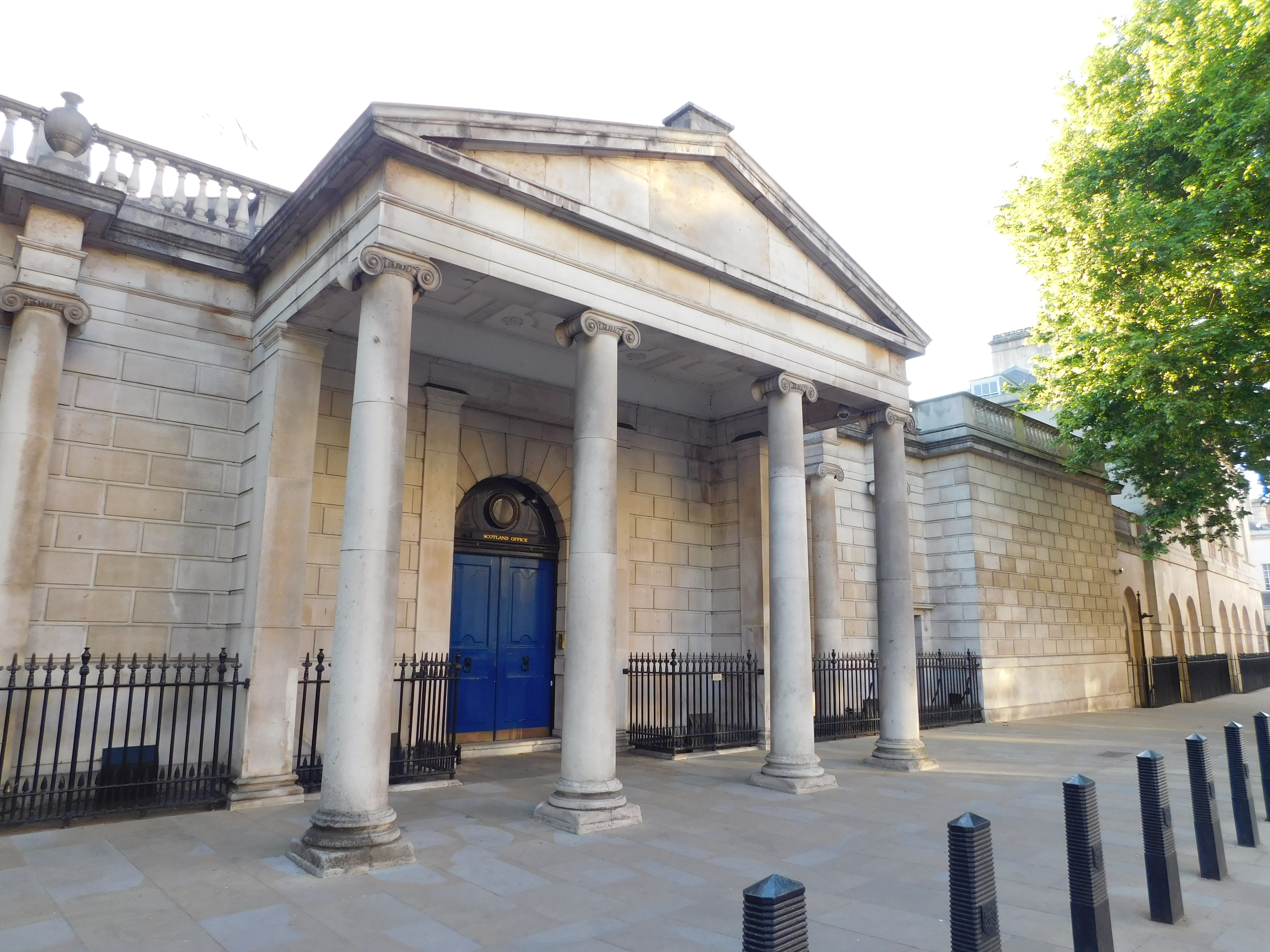
- Western aspect of Dover House, on Whitehall
- Interactive map of the Dover House area

General information
- Type: Neoclassical government building
- Architectural style: Neoclassical
- Location: London, SW1, Whitehall
- Coordinates: 51°30′15″N 0°7′37″W
- Current tenants: Scotland Office, Independent Commission for Aid Impact
- Completed: 1750s
- Renovated: 1788
- Client: Sir Matthew Fetherstonhaugh, Bart.

Design and construction
- Architect: James Paine
- Other designers: Henry Flitcroft, Henry Holland

Dover House is a Grade I-listed mansion in Whitehall, and the London headquarters of the Scotland Office. The building also houses the Office of the Advocate General for Scotland and the Independent Commission for Aid Impact.

== History ==
Dover House was designed by James Paine as the London townhouse of Sir Matthew Fetherstonhaugh, Bart., MP, in the 1750s. It was refurbished once again, by Henry Holland for the Prince Frederick, Duke of York, from 1788 to 1792. The building belonged to the Melbourne family from 1793 to 1830.

It has also been home to a French ambassador and Lady Caroline Lamb, with whom the Romantic poet Lord Byron famously had an affair. Its most notable feature is an entrance hall in the form of a rotunda inserted into the former forecourt by Holland, which is a unique entrance to a London mansion. The last private owners were the family of the Whig politician George James Welbore Agar-Ellis, created (1831) Baron Dover, whose title it has retained.

== Government use ==
The Agar-Ellis heirs owned Dover House from 1830 to 1885, when it became the Scottish Office, the UK government department responsible for Scottish affairs.

Although mostly used for the Scottish Office, this building was used by the Colonial Office for several years from 1941 onwards. In 1946 the Glasgow Herald speculated that "It will not be many years before the building will be put to demolition and new Government offices raised on the site." It was still in use by the Colonial Office when Zionist terrorists planted a bomb there in April 1947.

When Scotland acquired a devolved parliament, the responsibilities of the Scottish Office were reduced and, in 1999, was renamed the Scotland Office with Dover House remaining as its chief London building. The Scotland Office also has a Scottish headquarters, at Queen Elizabeth House in Edinburgh.

The Independent Commission for Aid Impact is also based at Dover House.

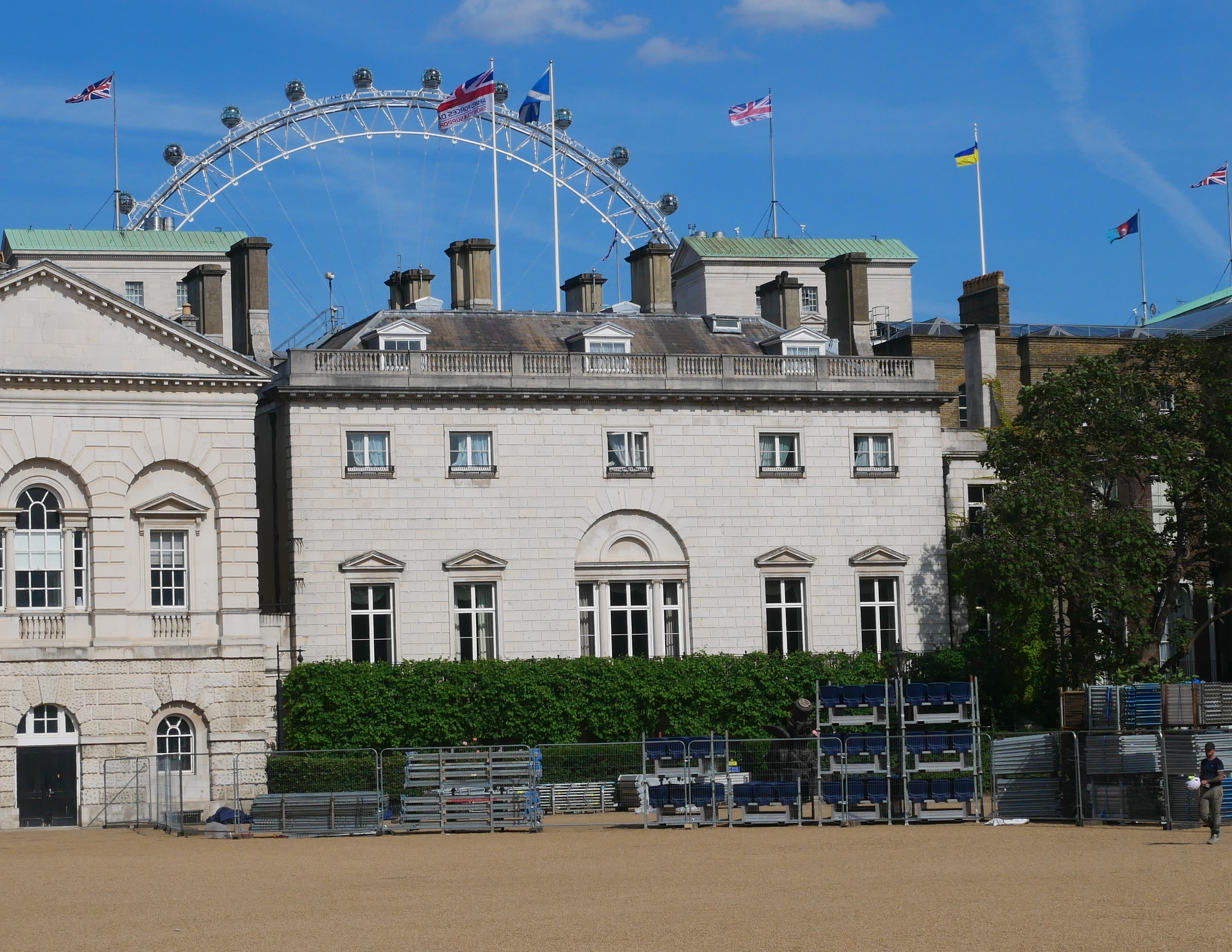
Rear of Dover House on Horse Guards Parade.

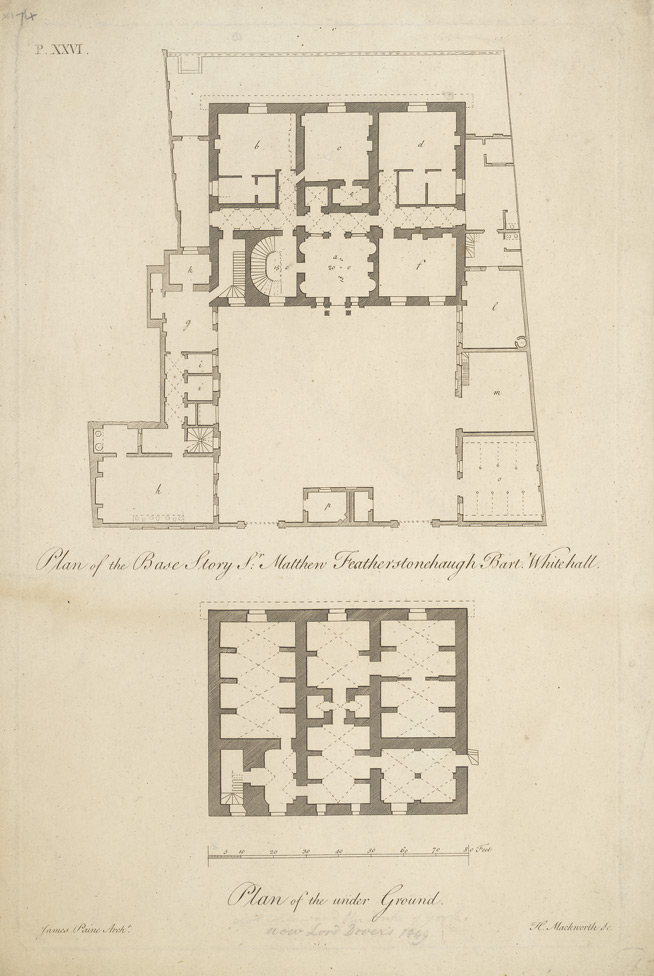
Plans of basement and ground floor as initially built for Sir Matthew Featherstonehaugh, Bart.

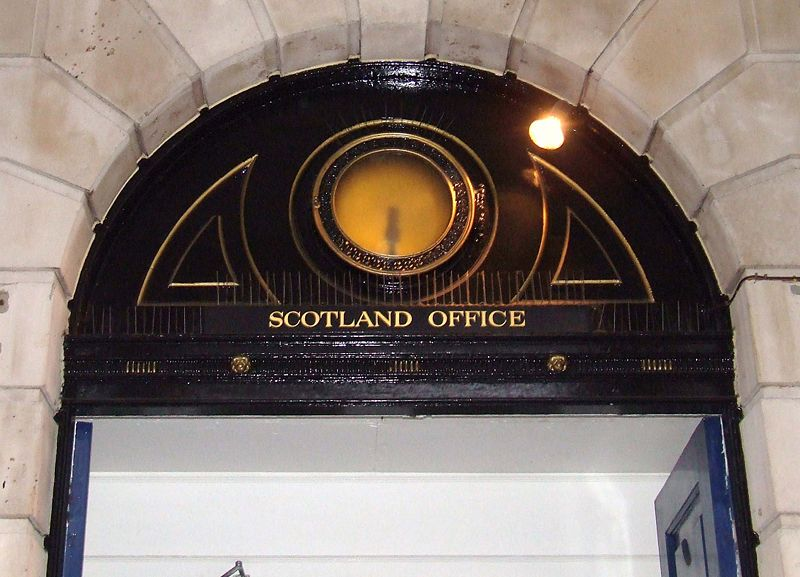
Entrance to the Scotland Office.

== Bibliography ==
- Stourton, James (2012). Great Houses of London (Hardback). London: Frances Lincoln. ISBN 978-0-7112-3366-9.
