= Will Jessett =

British politician

Will Jessett CBE is a former British politician and the Director for Strategic Planning at the United Kingdom Ministry of Defence (MOD) in London.

Jessett took up the role of Director for Strategic Planning in MOD Head Office in September 2014. In this role he has led MOD's work during the Strategic Defence and Security Review 2015 (SDSR15) which supports the UK Government's vision for a secure and prosperous United Kingdom, with global reach and influence. SDSR15 set a new head-mark for the UK's Armed Forces: A Joint Force 2025, equipped with a range of new and enhanced capabilities capable of taking on a broader range of missions against demanding scenarios and able to meet the challenges of today and ready for those of tomorrow. Following publication of SDSR15, Jessett led MOD's work in support the National Security and Capability Review (NSCR) that completed in March 2018. The NSCR was a whole-of-government approach to address the changing threats to the security of the UK.

Jessett also worked on the Modernising Defence Programme (MDP). The core tenets of MDP are to Modernise, Mobilise and Transform Armed Forces, including to help deliver the whole-of-government approach laid down in the "Fusion Doctrine".

Jessett previously served as the Minister of Defence Materiel (BDS-US Command Group) British Defence Staff - US alongside the Foreign and Commonwealth Office and other government departments that collectively serve the interests of Her Majesty's Government at the British Embassy in Washington, D.C.
