= Joint Committee on the National Security Strategy =

UK parliamentary committee

The Joint Committee on the National Security Strategy (JCNSS) is a joint committee of the Parliament of the United Kingdom, formed to "monitor the implementation and development" of the United Kingdom Government's National Security Strategy". It was first established in the 2005–2010 Parliament, and was reappointed in December 2010 and December 2015. The committee comprises a maximum of 12 members of the House of Commons and 10 members of the House of Lords.

== Role ==
The committee's terms of reference are "to consider the National Security Strategy". It has said that it does not wish to duplicate the work of other select committees, and instead intends to draw on their work. The Committee "scrutinises the structures for Government decision-making on National Security, particularly the role of the National Security Council (NSC) and the UK's National Security Adviser (NSA)."

== Chairs ==
Committee chairs include those listed below.

Name	Start	End	Party	Constituency
Margaret Beckett	9 February 2010	30 May 2024	Labour	Derby South
Matt Western	17 December 2024	present	Labour	Warwick and Leamington

== Membership ==
As of November 2026, the membership of the committee is as follows:

Member	Party	Note
Matt Western	Labour	Committee chair
James Arbuthnot	Conservative	Lord Arbuthnot of Edrom
Catherine Atkinson	Labour	Justice Committee chair
Paul Boateng	Labour	Lord Boateng
Karen Bradley	Conservative	Home Affairs Committee chair
Liam Byrne	Labour	Business and Trade Committee chair
Sarah Champion	Labour	International Development Committee chair
Tan Dhesi	Labour	Defence Committee chair
Bill Esterson	Labour	Energy Security and Net Zero Committee chair
Dean Godson	Conservative	Lord Godson
John Hutton	Labour	Lord Hutton of Furness
Alister Jack	Conservative	Lord Jack of Courance
Beeban Kidron	Crossbench	Baroness Kidron
Helen Maguire	Liberal Democrat	
Mike Martin	Liberal Democrat	
Chi Onwurah	Labour	Science, Innovation and Technology Committee chair
Mark Sedwill	Crossbench	Lord Sedwill
Emily Thornberry	Labour	Foreign Affairs Committee chair
Denis Tunnicliffe	Labour	Lord Tunnicliffe
Claire Tyler	Liberal Democrat	Baroness Tyler of Enfield
David Watts	Labour	Lord Watts
Gavin Williamson	Conservative	

== Inquiries ==
=== First Review of the National Security Strategy 2010 ===
The committee published its first report First Review of the National Security Strategy 2010 on 8 March 2012. The report addresses the National Security Strategy, the National Security Council (and the secretariat which supports it), and the National Security Adviser. It was agreed unanimously. The committee welcomed the National Security Strategy but said that it was work in progress and needed to be improved. In a press release sent out with the report it said that:

- There is no evidence that the NSS has influenced decisions made since the Strategic Defence and Security Review. If the current strategy is not guiding choices then it needs to be revised.
- There should be an "overarching strategy", a document designed to guide government decision-making and crisis management both at home and on the international stage.
- The government’s assertion that there will be no reduction in the UK's influence on the world stage is "wholly unrealistic in the medium to long term" and the UK needs to plan for a changing, and more partnership-dependent, role in the world.

It also said that the government's unwillingness to provide it with all the information it had asked for about the National Security Risk Assessment means that it was unable to give Parliament any assurances about its adequacy. The committee expressed concerns that the "National Security Council's oversight of security issues is not sufficiently broad and strategic", given that it was deeply involved in operations in Libya and failed to discuss the national security implications of the Eurozone crisis or the possibility of Scottish independence.

==== Government response and the committee's second report ====
The JCNSS published the government response to its first report on 11 July 2012, along with a two-page report summarising the committee's concerns about the response. The committee said that it welcomed the government response and the government's commitment to providing it with more information in future, but said that the government had failed to:

- to respond adequately to the committee's concerns about the implications of recent US strategy documents, the potential impact of Scottish independence, and the consequences of the Eurozone crisis
- to take the opportunity to look at how it could do things differently
- to press ahead with planning for the next National Security Strategy (NSS).

The committee said that the government needed to start to map out its programme for the next NSS immediately. It also called on the Government to supply it with an indicative programme for producing and consulting on the next NSS.

==== Government response to the committee's second report ====
The government responded in November 2012 and said that it was:

now starting to consider the scope, conceptual structure, process, timing, and possible forms of external (including international) engagement required to ensure that the 2015 NSS and SDSR will meet UK national security needs.

It said that "the Cabinet Office is leading initial preparatory work" on the NSS but did not give an "indicative programme" or set out the planned staffing, resources or public consultation as the committee had requested. It undertook to consult the JCNSS in confidence as the forward work programme took shape and to keep the Committee up-to-date on significant developments.

The JCNSS published this response as its First Special Report of Session 2012-13.

=== The work of the Joint Committee on the National Security Strategy in 2012 ===
In February 2013 the committee published its report The work of the Joint Committee on the National Security Strategy in 2012. This reviewed the committee’s work over the past year and called on the government to address five key areas of concern:

- The NSC appears to have focused on operational matters and short-term imperatives, rather than long-term strategy.
- The committee is not convinced that the NSC is making the contribution it should and questions how much extra value is derived from having the NSC as opposed to the preceding systems of Cabinet committees.
- Major strategic policy changes appear to have been made by individual government departments without discussion at the NSC: most notably, the big policy decisions made by the MoD last year in Future Reserves and Army 2020.
- The NSC appears to have neglected, or only recently discussed, some very central questions: the strategic and security impact of the Eurozone crisis and of efforts to save the Euro; the planned referendums on Scottish independence and EU membership; and the significance of the US pivot to Asia-Pacific.
- The Committee has not yet seen evidence of the government pressing ahead with planning for the next NSS or giving serious consideration to engaging outside experts, politicians across the political parties and the public in its development.

In a press release the chair of the committee said that “the NSC should think strategically, keeping its eye on the longer term and assessing the effect of Departments’ policy proposals. We were stunned that the NSC had not discussed the implications of the major policy changes made last year by the MOD. How it can be strategic if it has not considered the impact of restructuring the Army?”

=== Conflict, Stability and Security Fund Report 2017 ===
The Committee published its report into the Conflict, Stability and Security Fund (CSSF) in January 2017 after an eight-month inquiry. The report praised many of the intentions of the CSSF, but criticised its lack of transparency for the purposes of Parliamentary scrutiny. The Committee also noted that the CSSF would be better managed under the control of a single Government Minister, fearing that "collective responsibility will degenerate into no responsibility."

=== Cyber Security Inquiry ===
The JCNSS announced its Cyber Security Inquiry in January 2017.

== See also ==
- Conflict, Stability and Security Fund
- Joint committee of the Parliament of the United Kingdom
- National Security Strategy (United Kingdom)
- Parliamentary committees of the United Kingdom
