= Security Strategy =

A Security Strategy is a document prepared periodically which outlines the major security concerns of a country or organisation and outlines plans to deal with them. Several national security strategies exist:

- National Security Strategy (United States)
- National Security Strategy (United Kingdom)
- European Security Strategy, European Union
