= Katy Styles =

UK campaigner for unpaid carers rights

- Occupations: Carer; campaigner
- Organization: We Care Campaign
- Known for: Campaigning for unpaid carers' rights

Katy Styles is a full-time carer and campaigner for unpaid carers rights. Previously Styles worked as a teacher, but had to give up full-time employment to care for her husband. In 2018, she founded the We Care Campaign, which supports unpaid carers and has won awards for its campaigning projects.

== Personal life ==
Styles worked as a geography teacher for almost 20 years, before leaving work to become a full-time carer for her husband in 2014. She has since also become a carer for her mother and mother-in-law and currently lives in Canterbury, Kent.

She has been critical of cuts to disability benefits like Personal Independence Payment and the knock on impact such cuts has on carers who claim Carer's Allowance.

Styles co-hosts Care Fully Considered, a podcast that focuses on unpaid carers.

== We Care Campaign ==
Styles founded the We Care Campaign in 2018, which runs as a support group for unpaid carers. The group was set up after Styles became frustrated with the UK Government failing to launch a Carers Strategy despite over 6,500 carers and organisations contributing to a consultation in 2016. In 2017, the government announced that plans for a Carers Strategy had been scrapped. In January 2018, the We Care Campaign was formed and launched an on online petition demanding a Carers Strategy be implemented. A Carers Action Plan was published in June 2018. The petition was debated in the Commons in March 2019, with Caroline Dinenage explaining that carers would be considered in an upcoming Green Paper focused on care and support.

We Care was awarded the Best Digital Campaign award at the 2020 Sheila McKechnie Foundation awards.

In 2023 the group began working with Oxfam on their Domestic Dusters craftivism project that highlighted unpaid carers voices. Run with Vanessa Marr, University of Brighton lecturer, the project invited carers to embroider yellow dusters that were later displayed in Senedd building. In 2024, the project won the Creative Arts Award at the Markel 3rd Sector Care Awards.

In the lead up to the 2024 United Kingdom general election, We Care Campaign published a five-point call to action from parties to support carers, which included a demand for a national carer's strategy.

Within her work at We Care Campaign, Styles has also contributed to research around the impact on carers when they are subject to domestic abuse from those they care for.
