= Conscientious objection to military taxation =

Argument against tax for military spending

Conscientious objection to military taxation (COMT) is a legal theory that attempts to extend into the realm of taxation the concessions to conscientious objectors that many governments allow in the case of conscription, thereby allowing conscientious objectors to insist that their tax payments not be spent for military purposes.

Some tax resisters advocate legal recognition of a right to COMT, while others conscientiously resist taxes without concern for whether their stand has legal approval. This article addresses the former subgroup.

== Theory ==
COMT is thought by its proponents to be a logical extension to conscientious objection to military service. A person with a religious or ethical scruple against taking part in killing people during war is likely to feel no less scruple about paying somebody else to do the killing or about purchasing the mechanism of killing. If a government can respect the right of a person not to participate directly in making war, can it also respect the right of the person to avoid this indirect participation?

Proponents of COMT and of "Peace Tax Fund"-style legislation say that it will have numerous benefits that go beyond accommodating individual conscientious objectors, for instance:

- It will free people who are unwilling by reason of conscience to pay taxes or to engage in taxed activities to go ahead and pay taxes without fear of violating their consciences.
- It will promote freedom of religion and freedom of conscience and serve to educate people about their choices concerning warfare. As one advocate put it, "it will extend the legal recognition due to the absolute value of human life, and the freedom of the individual conscience to acknowledge it."
- It will increase government funding by encouraging tax resisters to become tax payers.
- It will encourage other anti-militaristic legislation and reevaluation of military spending.

=== Terminology ===
In tax circles, to restrict a tax payment from a particular purpose, or to designate a tax payment for a particular purpose, is called hypothecation.

== Historical precedents and legislative proposals ==
In the more general category of hypothecation, there are already well-established precedents: they include the gasoline tax in the United States, which is dedicated to the funding of transportation infrastructure.

In the more specific category of military-related hypothecation, there was at least one legal, government-instituted historical precedent: An "alternative tax" related specifically to militia duty lasted for eight years in Upper Canada between 1841 and 1849, as we see in this quote:

In 1793 in Upper Canada, Governor John Graves Simcoe offered Mennonites, Quakers and Brethren in Christ an exemption from militia duty, to encourage their immigration to Canada. They were however expected to pay a fee so that others could serve in their place.... In 1841, after years of lobbying, the government agreed to use this tax for public works. In 1849, the tax was eliminated.

Notice that the above quote refers to tax in exchange for "militia duty" and does not mention militia equipment, etc. In that respect it could be perceived as simply another form of quasi-alternative civilian service for conscientious objectors. Nevertheless, this tax still stands as a precedent because an alteration was made to a taxation system (as opposed to simply requiring alternative civilian service).

In the 1960s, a Quaker group in the United States drafted a prototype law that would allow conscientious objectors to pay their taxes to UNICEF instead of to the U.S. Treasury.

In the United States, legislation establishing a "Peace Tax Fund" has been proposed in Congress since 1972. As of 2021, the current proposal is called the Religious Freedom Peace Tax Fund Act.

Similar legislation is being considered in many other countries, and an international campaign to encourage such laws began in 1975, but no country recognizes a legal right for a taxpayer to direct his or her taxes for only non-military purposes.

A legislative bill was tabled in the Parliament of Canada in 1983, and several others have been tabled, but not passed, since then. New Democratic Party Member of Parliament Bill Siksay tabled bills C-397 (38th parliament, May 2005) and C-390 (40th parliament, May 2009). The latest incarnation of this legislation occurred in 2011 as Bill C-363. It was a private member's bill proposed by NDP MP Alex Atamanenko and would put income tax paid by Canadians committed to COMT into a special account to be audited yearly by the Parliamentary Budget Officer and used exclusively for peace building purposes. Conscientious objectors would be able to register with the Canada Revenue Agency so their taxes could be diverted away from the military.

== Objections ==
There are a number of common objections to COMT. Some people oppose legal recognition of conscientious objection even for military service and conscription, arguing that all citizens are obliged to serve in the military when the country requires it, and that nobody should be able to expect special treatment on conscientious grounds. This argument applies just as well or just as poorly against COMT.

Others argue that COMT would be too difficult to implement.

Another commonly raised objection is that COMT, if allowed, would establish a precedent for a general freedom for individual taxpayers to opt out of contributions for any tax-funded activity which they do not wish to support, including, for example, public education and healthcare.

Anarchists argue that to fund government at all is to fund violence, and so the only true pacifist conscientious tax objection is complete tax objection.

=== Objections from conscientious tax resisters ===
Some conscientious tax resisters have a different set of objections to COMT. They argue that the legislative proposals that have been proposed so far that would legalize COMT actually would have the paradoxical effect of encouraging more conscientious objectors to pay for more war than before.

They point out the ease with which the government can shift money from place to place in its budget, and borrow money when funds are not available. If a conscientious objector who had been unwilling to pay taxes started to pay into a "peace tax fund", this would only mean more money for the government to spend, and the likely result of that is more money for the military. The Religious Freedom Peace Tax Fund Act in the United States, for instance, would give the government more tax revenue and would not change how much or how high a percentage of this money was spent on the military.

The analogy to conscientious objection is flawed, these critics say: A conscientious objector to military service does not take up arms and kill. Perhaps somebody else is drafted to do so instead, but the conscientious objector does not. A "peace tax fund" payer, on the other hand, pays just as much money as the ordinary taxpayer, but just cherishes the illusion that her dollars were peaceful ones. It would be as if the government told conscientious objectors that they had to take up arms and shoot at the enemy just like everybody else, but that they did not have to take credit for their kills if they did not want to.

Another objection is that to make COMT legal is to make it no longer a protest against or a confrontation with evil, but instead a compromise with it. One Christian tax resister wrote that "worldly priorities must be objected to in word and deed. If the objecting deeds are done legally, they register little if any protest. If consciously illegal, they register an unequivocal refusal to agree with the world's values. The latter gets the attention of the state, the former does not."

== See also ==
- National Campaign for a Peace Tax Fund
- National War Tax Resistance Coordinating Committee
- Tax resistance in the United States
- War Resisters League
- On the Duty of Civil Disobedience
- Conscience: Taxes for Peace not War
