= Modernising Defence Programme =

British defence program

The Modernising Defence Programme (MDP) was the United Kingdom’s Ministry of Defence's strategic initiative in 2018.

== Description ==
The programme aimed to ensure that the UK's armed forces remain capable, adaptable, and ready to deal with emerging global security challenges. This was introduced after the Strategic Defence and Security Review (SDSR) in 2015 and against a backdrop of concerns about the adequacy of the UK's defence capabilities in light of evolving geopolitical threats.

The MDP focused on three key objectives: Mobilisation, Modernisation, and Transformation. Mobilisation involved enhancing the readiness of existing military forces by maximizing current capabilities and ensuring rapid response to crises. Modernisation centred on investing in cutting-edge technologies such as artificial intelligence, space-based defence systems, and advanced cyber capabilities to maintain a competitive edge over potential adversaries. Transformation sought to reform the MOD's internal processes, improving efficiency, reducing bureaucracy, and streamlining decision-making to support agile and effective military operations.

The programme also underscored the importance of strengthening the UK's defence industry by fostering closer partnerships with defence contractors and ensuring long-term sustainability through strategic investments. The MDP aligned its efforts with broader national security strategies, including reinforcing partnerships with allies and maintaining the country's global military presence. These efforts laid the foundation for subsequent reviews, including the Integrated Review of Security, Defence, Development, and Foreign Policy, published in 2021.
