= Sheila McKechnie Foundation =

UK activism nonprofit (2005-)

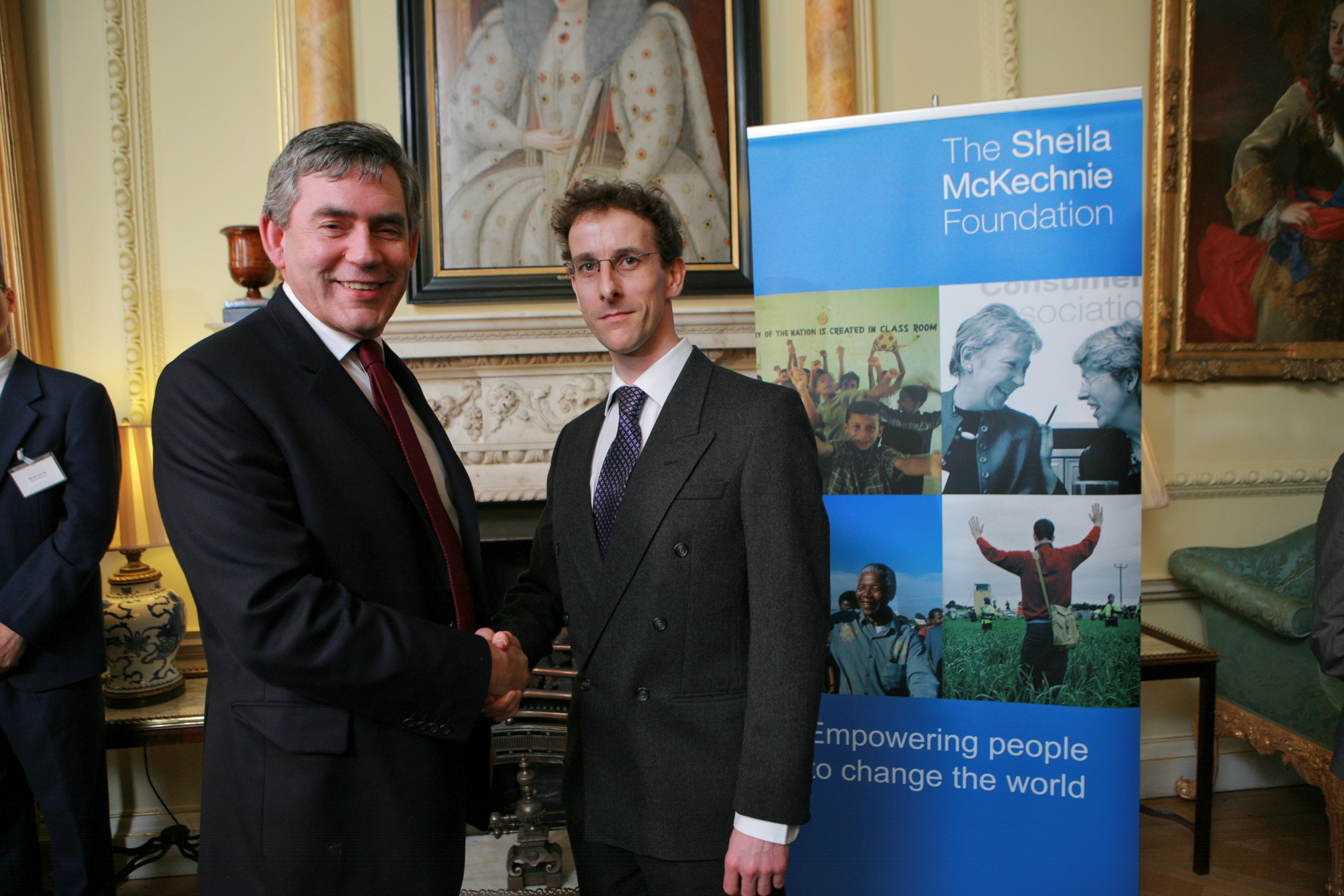
Prime Minister Gordon Brown giving the Sheila McKechnie Award to Nick Wilson at Downing Street for Conscience - the Peace Tax Campaign, July 2008

The Sheila McKechnie Foundation (SMK) is a charity based in the United Kingdom. It was founded in 2005 to support new and inexperienced campaigners, to champion the right to campaign, and to offer experience and resources to connect the campaign community.

== History ==
The charity was established following the death in 2004 of Sheila McKechnie, an influential and well-established campaigner, who had fought for such initiatives as the Financial Services Authority, the Food Standards Agency and the Freedom of Information Act. Currently, the staff and Associates at the foundation have experience in numerous areas including legal campaigning, digital and social media campaigning, influencing parliament and local government, community organising, and more.

== SMK National Campaigner Awards ==
The foundation runs the SMK National Campaigner Awards, an annual awards programme, and provides support, advice and a place to share information on key areas of effective campaigning: including strategy, tactics, targets, and evaluating successful campaigns. Categories for the SMK awards include: Amplifying Voices; Best Use of Law; Best Consumer Rights Campaign; Best Community Climate and Nature Action; Creative Change-makers David & Goliath; Young Campaigner Award; Campaign of the Year, Campaigners of the Year; and Long-term Achievement Award.

Previous winners include Pinkstinks and the We Care Campaign.
