= National Campaign for a Peace Tax Fund =

American non-profit organization

The National Campaign for a Peace Tax Fund (NCPTF) is a non-profit organization located in Washington, D.C. It was founded in 1971 to address conscientious objection to military taxation.

== History and purpose ==
The campaign exists solely to pass Peace Tax legislation in the United States. Such legislation would provide a way for some conscientious objectors to participate in the tax system without violating their beliefs. The proposed legislation, Religious Freedom Peace Tax Fund Act, would amend the Internal Revenue Code to allow a conscientious objector to have his or her income, estate, and gift tax payments spent for non-military purposes only.

The campaign advocates and educates on behalf of citizens who are petitioning the government for the right to pay 100% of their taxes without violating their religious or ethical teachings. Voluntary contributions from some 2,000 individuals and from organizations support the campaign. The annual budget is $140,000. Forty seven national organizations officially endorse the effort.

The bill has yet to be passed. The United States House of Representatives held hearings on the proposal in 1992 and 1995. In the 114th congress, the Religious Freedom Peace Tax Fund Act has been sponsored by Representative John Lewis and as of January 2017 has no cosponsors.

NCPTF was formerly called "National Council for a World Peace Tax Fund."

== See also ==
- List of anti-war organizations
- Conscientious objectors
- Conscientious objection to military taxation
- National War Tax Resistance Coordinating Committee
- Peace Churches
- Tax resistance
