= Office for Conflict, Stabilisation and Mediation =

Government unit in the United Kingdom

The Office for Conflict, Stabilisation and Mediation (OCSM), formerly the Stabilisation Unit, is a cross-government unit of the UK government, governed through the National Security Council. It is part of the Foreign, Commonwealth & Development Office (FCDO). It works cross-government to reduce the creation and intensity of conflicts abroad.

== The Stabilisation Unit's history ==
The Stabilisation Unit aims to support fragile states and countries emerging from conflict, where close cooperation between international agencies, the military, and civilian personnel is essential.

The Stabilisation Unit, formed in 2007 from the Post-Conflict Reconstruction Unit, serves a similar function to and works closely with institutions such as the Stabilization and Reconstruction Task Force (Canada) and the Bureau of Conflict and Stabilization Operations (United States).

Since 2015 the unit has been funded through the Conflict, Stability and Security Fund and governed through the National Security Council. Prior to 2015 it was it is jointly controlled by the FCO, the DFID, and the MOD. As of February 2022, the Stabilisation Unit was merged with former Department for International Development and Foreign & Commonwealth Office (FCO) staff to form the OCSM.

=== Former SU Activities ===
The Stabilisation Unit's objectives were:

- To prevent or contain violent conflict;
- To protect people, key assets and institutions
- To promote political processes which lead to greater stability.
- Prepare for longer-term development and address the causes of conflict.

==== SU Locations ====
The Stabilisation Unit provided advice, or assistance, for various places in crisis, including:

- Afghanistan: The SU has helped with a variety of problems in Helmand province.
- Democratic Republic of Congo: A stabilisation advisor has been with MONUC since 2008.
- Haiti: Assisting prisons in Haiti after the earthquake
- Iraq: The SU assisted the Provincial Reconstruction Team in Basra, and helped rebuild police capabilities.
- Sudan: Helping with civil society engagement. Four consultants are in Darfur.
- Kosovo, Moldova, Somalia, Yemen, and Pakistan: The SU helped build strategies for assisting these countries.

=== SU People ===
The SU recruits civil servants into the Civil Service Stabilisation Cadre (CSSC).

The SU also recruits civilians; the UK Civilian Stabilisation Group (CSG) was launched in February 2010. The SU maintains a flexible and diverse pool of civilian experts who can be deployed to assist other countries to help build peace & security.
