= Westminster Foundation for Democracy =

United Kingdom non-departmental public body

- Abbreviation: WFD
- Formation: February 26, 1992; 34 years ago
- Founded at: London, United Kingdom
- Headquarters: London, United Kingdom
- Location: Worldwide
- Chair of the Board: TBA
- CEO: Anthony Smith
- Board of directors: Yasmin Qureshi, Liz Saville Roberts, Mark Babington, James Deane, Milica Delević
- Staff: 142 (2021)
- Website: wfd.org

The Westminster Foundation for Democracy (WFD) is a United Kingdom non-departmental public body set up to support democratic institutions overseas. It was established on 26 February 1992 and registered as a company limited by guarantee in the UK. It receives funding from the Foreign, Commonwealth and Development Office (FCDO).

Former diplomat Anthony Smith has been CEO since August 2014.

== History ==
Established on 26 February 1992, not long after the fall of the Berlin wall, WFD initially focused on providing support to political parties in Eastern European countries as they transition to democracy. By the 2000s, WFD became well known as an organisation with specialty in strengthening parliamentary capacity through their programmes.

== Objectives ==
WFD works to achieve sustainable political change in emerging democracies. Working with and through partner organisations, WFD seeks to strengthen the institutions of democracy through capacity building initiatives, technical support, and research projects that involve principally political parties (through the work of the UK political parties), parliaments, and the range of institutions that make up civil society, which includes non-governmental organisations (NGOs), trade unions, and the free press, among others.

== Funding ==
In 2016, WFD had a budget of about £7 million, of which about £2.5 million was spent through the major UK political parties. WFD accounts are presented to the UK parliament annually. In 2021, its budget had doubled to over £14 million which included funds received from the FCDO, the Conflict, Stability and Security Fund (CSSF), the European Union (EU), and others.

== Offices ==
WFD is headquartered in London. As of September 2021, WFD operates in 25 countries grouped into several regional groupings: Asia, Europe & Central Asia, Middle East & North Africa, Sub-Saharan Africa, and Latin America.

Asia-Pacific (9)
- Indonesia
- Laos
- Malaysia
- Maldives
- Nepal
- Philippines (Bangsamoro)
- Solomon Islands
- Thailand
- Sri Lanka

Latin America (1)

- Venezuela

Middle East & North Africa (3)

- Jordan
- Lebanon
- Morocco

Sub-Saharan Africa (5)

- Gambia
- Kenya
- Nigeria
- Sierra Leone
- Uganda

Europe & Central Asia (3)

- Armenia
- Georgia
- Ukraine

Western Balkans (5)

- Albania
- Bosnia & Herzegovina
- Montenegro
- North Macedonia
- Serbia

The following are countries where the WFD had previously established a programme and/or a country office but had since been closed down:

- Algeria
- Armenia
- Democratic Republic of the Congo
- Ghana
- Kosovo
- Kyrgyzstan
- Myanmar
- Mozambique
- Pakistan
- Sudan
- Tunisia
- Uzbekistan

== See also ==
- National Endowment for Democracy, a similar organisation based in the United States
- Electoral Reform Society, an organisation seeking improvement in UK democracy
- Conflict, Stability and Security Fund, a similar organisation established by the UK government
