= Sheila McKechnie =

Scottish trade unionist

Dame Sheila Marshall McKechnie DBE (3 May 1948 – 2 January 2004) was a Scottish trade unionist, housing campaigner and consumer activist.

== Biography ==
Sheila McKechnie was born in Camelon, Falkirk, on 3 May 1948 to Hugh McKechnie, then a commercial traveller, and Christina (née Marshall). She studied politics and history at the University of Edinburgh, where she was a friend of Gordon Brown. She was a member of the students' representative council, holding the posts of Secretary and 2nd Junior President. After graduating, she studied for an MA in Industrial Relations at the University of Warwick.

After working as a trade union official in the 1970s, during which she was active in the women's movement, she became director of the housing and homelessness charity Shelter in 1985.

After ten years in this post, she left to become head of the Consumers' Association, campaigning on a wide range of issues, often using headline-grabbing stunts. In 2001 McKechnie said: "I am a fully paid-up member of the awkward squad and will remain so for the rest of my life. No government would ever feel entirely comfortable with me or the association because we are both fiercely, fiercely independent."

She was made an OBE in the 1995 Birthday Honours for her work with Shelter, and DBE in 2001 for her work on behalf of consumers. She was chosen as the University of Edinburgh alumnus of the year in 1991. She was on the Board of Trustees of The Architecture Foundation.

McKechnie was diagnosed with cancer in 1997. Following her death in 2004, aged 55, the Sheila McKechnie Foundation was established to support a new generation of campaigners.

In 2006, a bronze bust of McKechnie was erected in the walled garden within Dollar Park in Falkirk, near her birthplace of Camelon. The bust was created by artist Suzanne Robinson.
