= Strategic Defence and Security Review 2015 =

UK government publication

The National Security Strategy and Strategic Defence and Security Review 2015 was published by the British government during the second Cameron ministry on 23 November 2015 to outline the United Kingdom's defence strategy up to 2025. It identified key threats to the UK and the capabilities it required to address them.

== Threats ==
The National Security Risk Assessment 2015 found the threats faced by the UK, including its Overseas Territories and overseas interests, have "increased in scale, diversity and complexity" since 2010. It highlighted four particular threats that are likely to be priorities for UK security in the coming decade:

1. The increasing threat posed by terrorism, extremism and instability.
2. The resurgence of state-based threats; and intensifying wider state competition.
3. The impact of technology, especially cyber threats; and wider technological developments.
4. The erosion of the rules-based international order, making it harder to build consensus and tackle global threats.

== Decisions ==
The commitments in the paper for equipment and support for the three services amounted to £178 billion up to 2025. This is roughly 20% of the 10 year budget period.

The government reaffirmed its commitment to spending 2% of national GDP on defence.

=== Joint Forces ===
- The largest deployable expeditionary force to be increased from 30,000 to 50,000 by 2025. This includes a maritime task group headed by an aircraft carrier, a land division consisting of three brigades, an air group of combat, surveillance and transport aircraft, and a Special Forces task group.
- Planned investment in Special Forces equipment doubled and advanced communications equipment and weapons will be purchased.
- British Defence Staffs headquarters will be established in the Middle East, Asia-Pacific and Africa in 2016.
- £1.9 billion investment in cyber capabilities and development of satellite communications and space-based surveillance capabilities.
- The Ministry of Defence would purchase at least 2 Airbus Zephyr high-altitude UAVs.
- The number of nuclear warheads will be reduced to no more than 180 by the mid-2020s.

=== Royal Navy ===
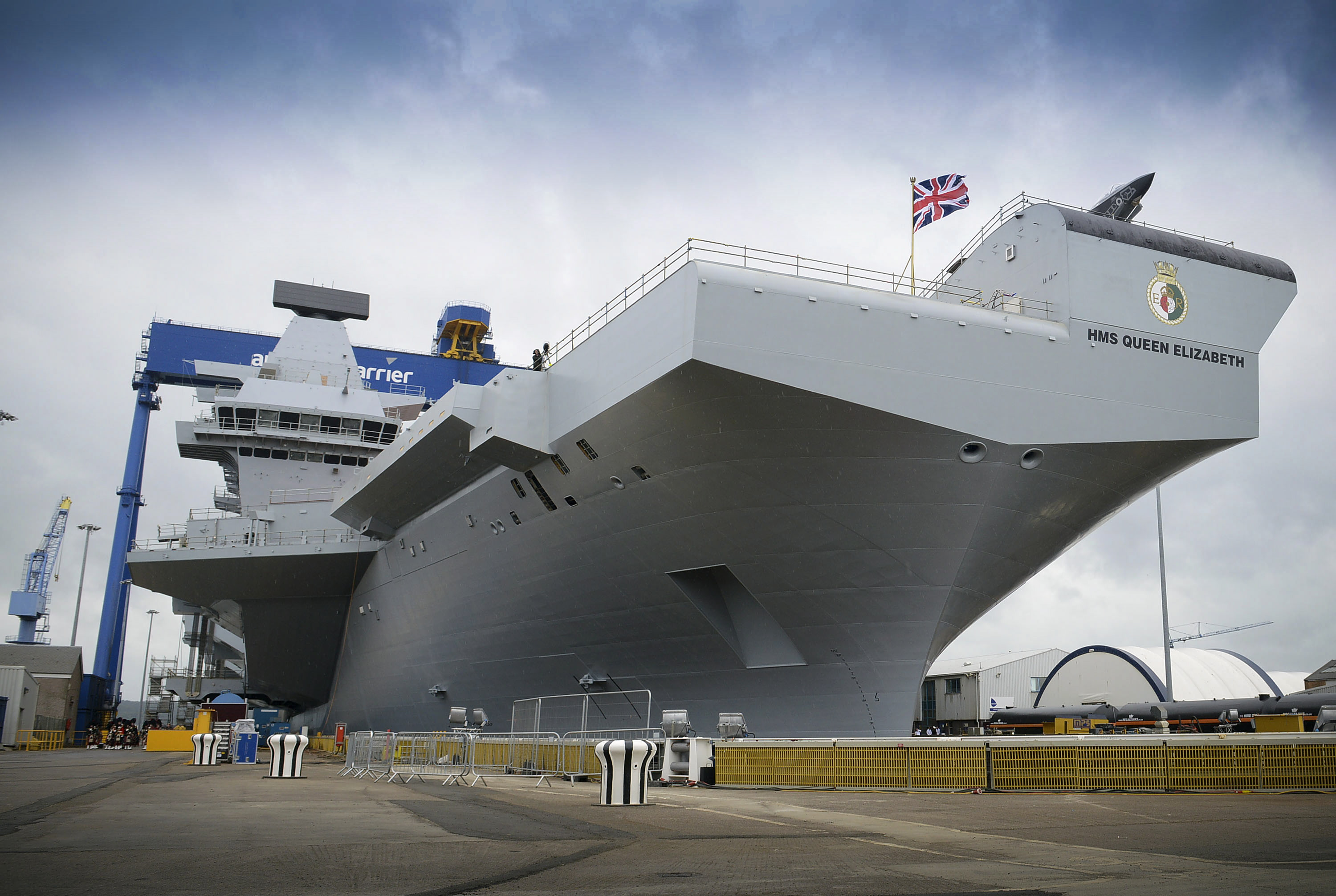
Both Queen Elizabeth-class aircraft carriers will now enter service.

- Personnel to be increased by 400.
- Both Queen Elizabeth-class aircraft carriers to be brought into service and fully crewed, one of which would be modified to better support amphibious operations and one carrier to be available at all times.
- The Royal Navy continue to maintain 19 frigates and destroyers, but with the long-term goal of ultimately increasing the fleet.
- Procurement of the Type 26 frigate reduced from 13 to 8. A new class of "at least five" lighter, flexible, general purpose frigates to be designed and built to ensure the Royal Navy has "at least" 13 frigates in service. These were to be more affordable than the Type 26s in order to allow the Royal Navy to buy more of them and further expand its fleet of frigates and destroyers by the 2030s. This second variant to be known as the Type 31 frigate.
- A new class of ballistic missile submarines, now known as the Dreadnought class, to be built to replace all four Vanguard-class submarines, the first of which will enter service in the early 2030s. Ballistic missile submarines to carry no more than 40 warheads across only eight operational Trident D5 missiles
- A further two River-class patrol vessels were to be ordered for a fleet of "up to 6" by 2025. The three Batch 2 River-Class ships to replace the earlier 3 Batch 1 River-Class ships. Later, during a Defence Select Committee in July 2016, the First Sea Lord Admiral Sir Philip Andrew Jones indicated that the option for a fleet of 'up to six' offshore patrol vessels had been reduced to five, with Clyde being replaced by one of the new Batch 2 ships.
- Four Tide-class tankers were to continue to be built as originally planned, along with three Solid Support Ship.
- Both Albion-class landing platform docks and all three Bay-class landing ship docks to remain in service. The previously planned decommissioning of HMS Ocean was confirmed.
- 12 mine countermeasures vessels to exist in Joint Force 2025. The three oldest Sandown-class minehunters to be decommissioned.
- The manning levels for the Gibraltar Squadron to increase.
- The role of Type 45 destroyers in ballistic missile defence will be further investigated.
- A parliamentary reply noted that "The consideration of options to deliver the capabilities provided by RFA Diligence and RFA Argus remains ongoing" although this policy was vague and had not been acted upon.

=== Royal Air Force ===
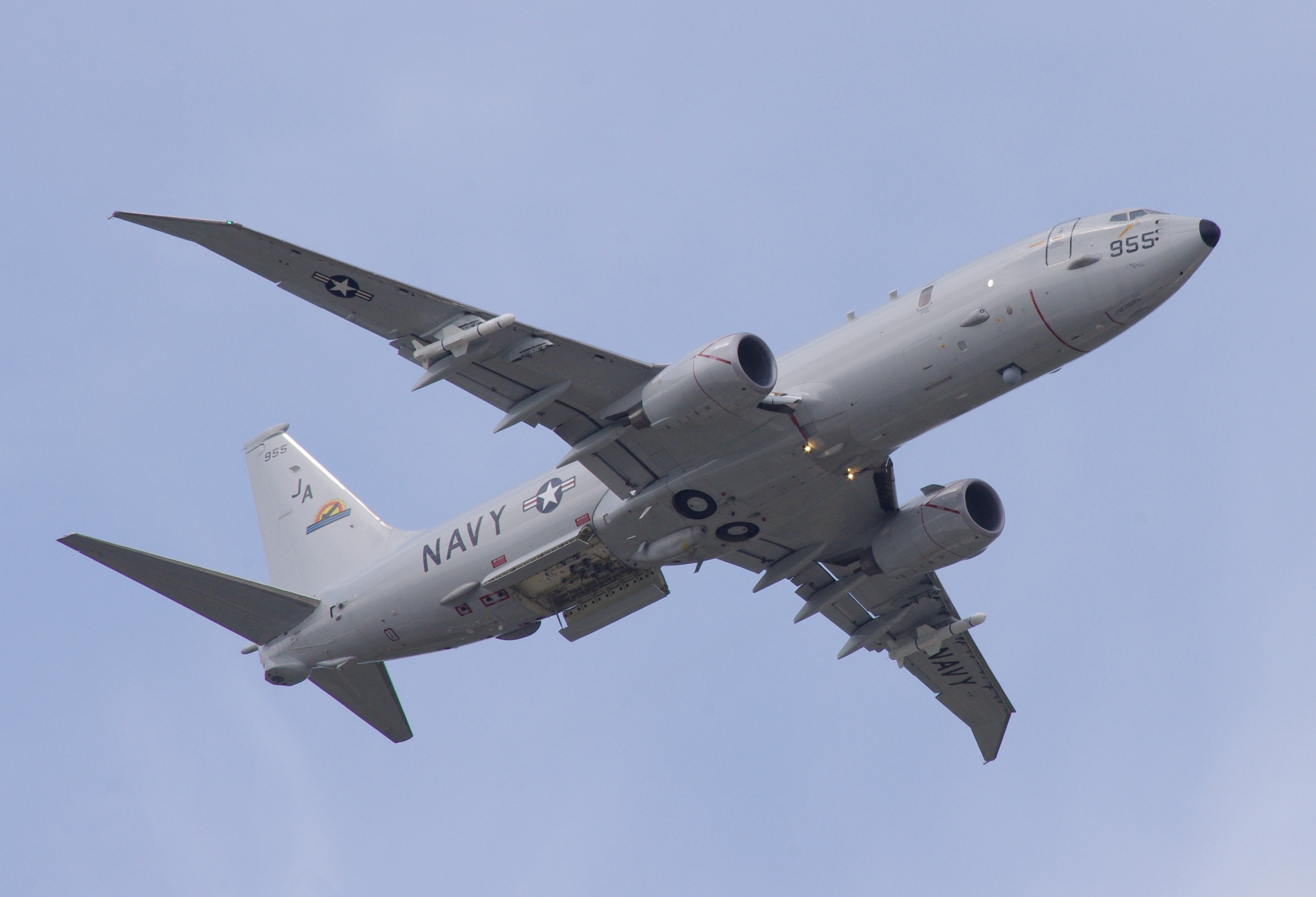
Commitment to order 9 P-8 Poseidon maritime patrol aircraft was made in the paper.

- Personnel to be increased by 300.
- Two additional Eurofighter Typhoon squadrons to be formed by postponing plans to retire Tranche 1 Typhoons. This was to bring the total number of frontline Typhoon squadrons to seven by 2025 (though the 2021 defence review later announced the retirement of all Tranche 1s by 2025). The Typhoon aircraft were also to receive upgrades to ensure they would be retained for an additional ten years (until 2040).
- There was a reaffirmed commitment to ordering 138 Lockheed Martin F-35 Lightning IIs, with a total of 24 available to be deployed on board the Queen Elizabeth-class carriers by 2023.
- The paper announced that the third Tornado GR4 Squadron (12 Squadron) would continue until 2018 while the remaining two squadrons, 9 and 31 Squadrons would have an out of service date of 2019.
- Nine Boeing P-8 Poseidon maritime patrol aircraft to be ordered to plug the gap left by the retirement of the Nimrod in 2011 and the scrapping of its planned successor, the Nimrod MRA4. The aircraft will be based at RAF Lossiemouth.
- The RPAS fleet to be doubled with the current 10 General Atomics MQ-9 Reapers to be replaced by more than 20 new armed Protector Drones (program formerly known as Scavenger). (This decision was subsequently modified in the 2021 defence review).
- 14 C-130J Hercules aircraft to remain in service alongside 22 Airbus A400M Atlas and 8 Boeing C-17 Globemaster III. (This decision was subsequently modified in the 2021 defence review).
- 14 Voyager air-to-air refuelling aircraft to be in service by 2025, with one fitted for transport of the Prime Minister, senior cabinet officials and the Royal Family.
- Continued investment to be made in the development of new precision weapons.
- Around four Sentinel R1 to be extended in service "into the next decade", but to leave service by 2025. (This decision was subsequently modified in the 2021 defence review).
- Shadow R1 to remain in service until "at least" 2030 and two more aircraft will be procured.
- Sentry AEW1 and Rivet Joint R1 to remain in service until 2035. (The decision concerning the continuation of the Sentry AEW1 was subsequently modified in the 2021 defence review).

=== British Army ===
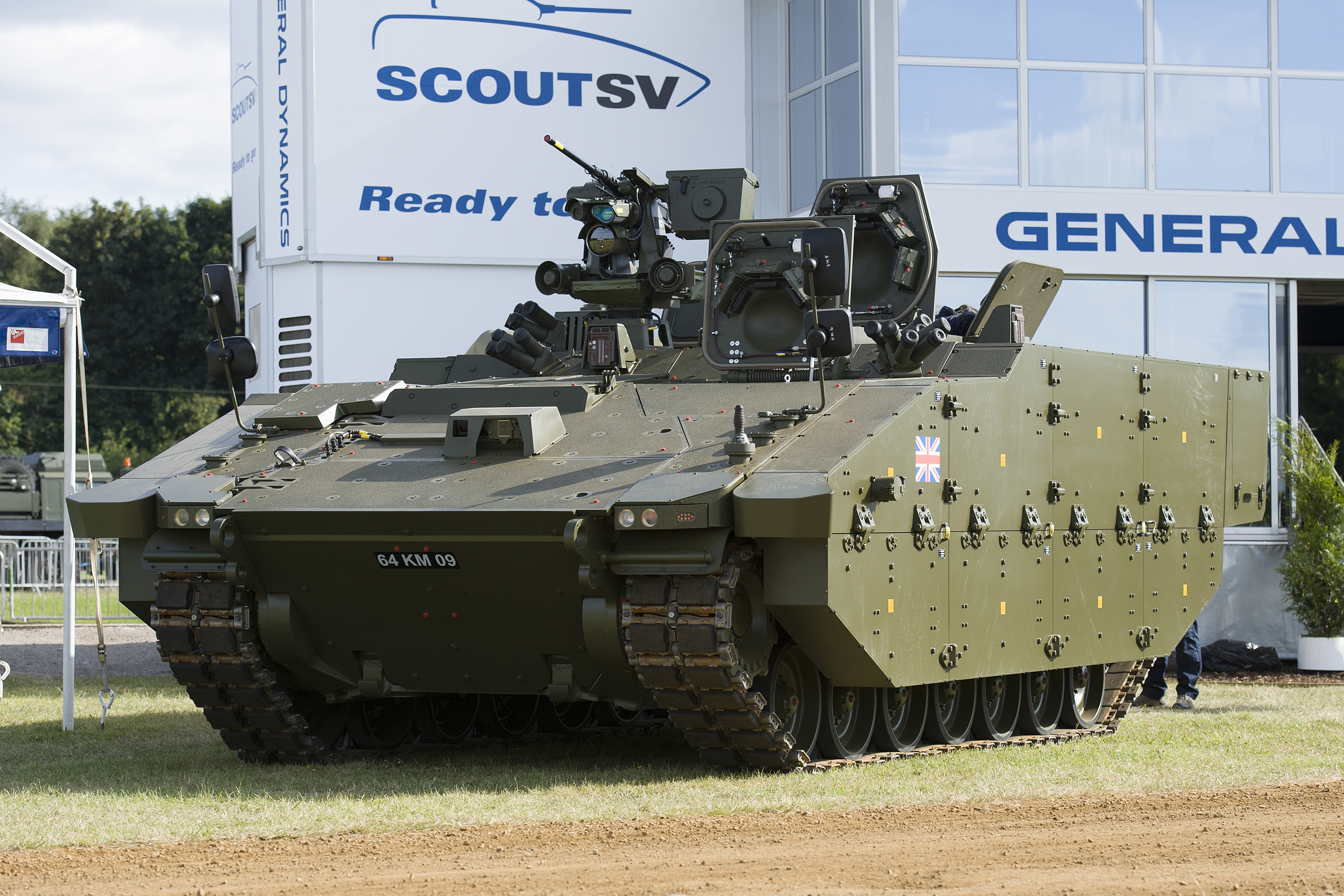
The Ajax armoured vehicle, of which 589 are to be ordered.

- The size of the Army will not fall below 82,000 regulars and 35,000 reservists.
- Increased investment will be put into training and equipment for the reserves.
- 589 Ajax armoured vehicles will be ordered.
- Two rapid-reaction "Strike Brigades" will be formed by 2025, comprising 5,000 personnel each, equipped with Ajax and the Mechanised Infantry Vehicle. The Armoured Infantry Brigades will be reduced from three to two.
- Two innovative brigades will be established, comprising a mix of Regulars and specialist capabilities from the Reserves, that are able to contribute to strategic communications, tackle hybrid warfare and deliver better battlefield intelligence.
- Apache attack helicopters will be upgraded. Four squadrons will exist in 2025.
- Challenger 2 tanks will be upgraded by the Life Extension Project (LEP), which will extend the tank's out-of-service date.
- The 77th Brigade will be the core unit for counter-hybrid warfare.
- "Commander Land Forces" will become "Commander Field Army".

=== Intelligence agencies ===
- There will be an increase of 1,900 security and intelligence staff across all intelligence agencies to respond to terrorism, cyber and other threats.

== Foreign policy ==
The government outlined a range of foreign policy initiatives. These included:

- A permanent UK military presence will be maintained in the Persian Gulf, including a new naval base in Bahrain, named HMS Juffair, and the establishment of a new British Defence Staff in the Middle East, as well as in the Asia Pacific and Africa.
- There will be a doubling of the number of military personnel contributed to United Nations peacekeeping operations.
- The UK will work with the rule-based international order and help strengthen multilateral institutions.
- UK Official Development Assistance expenditure will be maintained at 0.7% of GNI, with 50% of the DFID's spending going towards fragile states.

== Reaction ==
- Malcolm Chambers of the Royal United Services Institute (RUSI) welcomed the 2015 NSS and SDSR, stating that "The outcome of this SDSR is much better than the armed forces had been expecting only six months ago, when further steep capability cuts – comparable to those suffered over the last five years – were widely anticipated."
- Former Chief of the General Staff Lord Dannatt welcomed the SDSR, stating that it was an attempt to rectify past errors made in the 2010 SDSR.
- The International Institute for Strategic Studies (IISS) responded to the SDSR by saying it "offers a credible plan to improve, modernise and increase UK security and hard power. It maintains the UK as a significant defence power, and adds and protects future capabilities, including in areas that are needed to deal with modern threats such as terrorism and cyber attack."
- A report in Defense Aerospace argued that the review actually showed that "New cash is in short supply [and the] new capabilities [are] undefined, uncosted, unscheduled.
- James de Waal of Chatham House argued that the review was more of a "political success" for the Conservative-led government, but "the way it came together speaks to larger problems with British policy-making on security."
- The Economist judged that Britain had reasserted itself as a "serious military power".
- Japanese Minister of Defense Gen Nakatani said the review reaffirmed the UK's commitment to its "presence as a global power" and "The SDSR highlighted Japan as the closest security partner in Asia, and I highly regard this statement."
- In a policy paper for History & Policy, Edward Longinotti argues that Britain's strategic defence review comes at a time when the country's defence policy faces the same challenges as those encountered in 1968: how to accommodate two major commitments, to Europe and to an ‘east of Suez’ global military strategy, within a modest defence budget that can only fund one.
- Prime Minister David Cameron claimed U.S. President Barack Obama was "clearly delighted" with the results of the UK's defence review, with US officials reported to have been concerned at the weakening of UK defence capability caused by previous cuts.

== See also ==
- Integrated Review
- Security and Defence Review 2021
- Strategic Defence and Security Review 2010
- National Security Strategy (United Kingdom)
- Will Jessett
