= Adaptation at Scale in Semi-Arid Regions =

Research project in Africa and India

The Adaptation at Scale in Semi-Arid Regions (ASSAR), is a five-year research project (March 2014–December 2018) supported by Department for International Development, DFID and the Canadian IDRC (International Development Research Centre) that aimed to improve adaptive livelihoods for vulnerable groups by better understanding the enablers and barriers to widespread and transformative adaptation at multiple governance scales. ASSAR was part of the CARIAA (Collabora ve Adapta on Research Initiative in Africa and Asia) program.

The ASSAR project integrated multidisciplinary scientific research (at the regional and theme levels), capacity building, and stakeholder engagement. to enhance knowledge of the obstacles and facilitators to successful climate adaptation. Research teams will collaborate in multiple South Asian and African nations to produce reliable information that decision-makers and others may utilize to create effective adaptation strategies.

ASSAR works in a regulated format in six countries across West Africa, East Africa and Southern Africa as well as three states (Karnataka, Maharashtra and Tamil Nadu) in India, on case-study related research and sought to combine climatic, social, economic and environmental change.

== Project Goals ==
The goal of the Adaptation at Scale in Semi-Arid Regions (ASSAR) project is to enhance the management of existing hazards while enabling proactive, longer-term approaches to climate change adaptation in semi-arid regions. ASSAR seeks to address the requirements of practitioner and government stakeholders through participatory work from 2014 to 2018, helping to design more effective policy frameworks and creating more durable adaptation solutions.

ASSAR also collaborated with partners to identify obstacles to adaptation, comprehend distinct vulnerabilities, and investigate the necessary steps to enable more widespread, effective, and sustained adaptation. Also, the goal of ASSAR's research is to create a distinct and comprehensive understanding of the mechanisms and elements that prevent adaptation and continue vulnerability.
