= Religious Freedom Peace Tax Fund Act =

Proposed legislation in the United States

The Religious Freedom Peace Tax Fund Act is legislation proposed in the United States Congress that would legalize a form of conscientious objection to military taxation.

== Description ==
This act would establish a "peace tax fund" that parallels the general fund which the government draws upon to pay its expenses. But the peace tax fund, unlike the general fund, could only be used for non-military spending:

the term "military purpose" means any activity or program which any agency of the Government conducts, administers, or sponsors and which effects an augmentation of military forces or of defensive and offensive intelligence activities, or enhances the capability of any person or nation to wage war, including the appropriation of funds by the United States for 1) the Department of Defense; 2) the Central Intelligence Agency; 3) the National Security Council; 4) the Selective Service System; 5) activities of the Department of Energy that have a military purpose; 6) activities of the National Aeronautics and Space Administration that have a military purpose; 7) foreign military aid; and 8) the training, supplying, or maintaining of military personnel, or the manufacture, construction, maintenance, or development of military weapons, installations, or strategies.

The peace tax fund would be funded by the "income, gift, and estate taxes paid by or on behalf" of designated conscientious objectors:

the term "designated conscientious objector" means a taxpayer who is opposed to participation in war in any form based upon the taxpayer's deeply held moral, ethical, or religious beliefs or training (within the meaning of the Military Selective Service Act (50 U.S.C. App. 450 et seq.)), and who has certified these beliefs in writing to the Secretary of the Treasury in such form and manner as the Secretary provides.

The relevant section of "50 U.S.C. App. 450 et seq." defined a designated conscientious objector as one:

...who, by reason of religious training and belief, is conscientiously opposed to participation in war in any form. As used in this subsection, the term "religious training and belief" does not include essentially political, sociological, or philosophical views, or a merely personal moral code

However, the U.S. Supreme Court, in Seeger v. U.S. (1965) and Welsh v. U.S. (1970), ruled that sincere and deep objections to war did not have to come from formal religious training or even from a belief that the conscientious objector himself considers to be "religious" in order to meet this test. Seeger, for instance, said that he had a "belief in and devotion to goodness and virtue for their own sakes, and a religious faith in a purely ethical creed," and the Supreme Court said that this was sufficient. A non-religious conscientious objector can qualify, despite what the law says, as long as his

opposition to war stem[s] from the registrant's moral, ethical, or religious beliefs about what is right and wrong and that these beliefs [are] held with the strength of traditional religious convictions.

=== Effect on government revenue and spending ===
The legislation itself notes that "The Joint Committee on Taxation has certified that a tax trust fund, providing for conscientious objector taxpayers to pay their full taxes for non-military purposes, would increase Federal revenues." This presumably because some war tax resisters would return to paying taxes.

There would be some additional cost in implementing and accounting for such a distinct fund and in providing mechanisms for taxpayers to use it.

The act would not directly reduce either the amount of money the federal government spends on the military nor the percentage of the federal budget that goes to military spending. The National Priorities Project, using a similar definition of "military purpose" as is in this bill, estimates that "[m]ilitary spending consumes 26 cents out of every individual income tax dollar. It makes up about 20% of total federal spending and over half of the discretionary budget."

The bill would only directly affect the amount of military spending if the general fund were to become smaller than the amount to be spent on the military. If that were to happen, the government would either have to borrow money to make up the difference, illegally dip into the Peace Tax Fund, or reduce military spending.

How many people would have to become conscientious objectors to military taxation for this to happen? If, for simplicity's sake, we assume that likely conscientious objectors to military taxation currently pay on average about the same amount of taxes as everyone else, in order to make any reduction to the 26% of every tax dollar that is spent for military purposes, more than 74% of taxpayers would have to declare themselves conscientious objectors. If we factor in deficit spending and taxes that are not covered by the Act (such as the corporate income tax and excise taxes), that percentage rises to over 90%.

== History ==
In the United States, legislation that would establish a "Peace Tax Fund" has been proposed in Congress since 1972. The United States House of Representatives held hearings on the proposal in 1992 and 1995. In the 117th Congress, the bill, H.R. 4529, was sponsored by Representative James P. McGovern and as of May 2023 had no cosponsors.

Some taxpayers asserted that the Religious Freedom Restoration Act, which became law in 1993, should necessitate legalizing conscientious objection to military taxation. The Second Circuit Court and Third Circuit Court are the highest courts to hear this argument, and they disagreed. The U.S. Supreme Court declined to hear such a case in 2000.

== See also ==
- Civilian Bonds
- National Campaign for a Peace Tax Fund
- Peace Churches
- Render unto Caesar...
- Tax choice
- Tax resistance
