= Personnel numbers in the Royal Air Force =

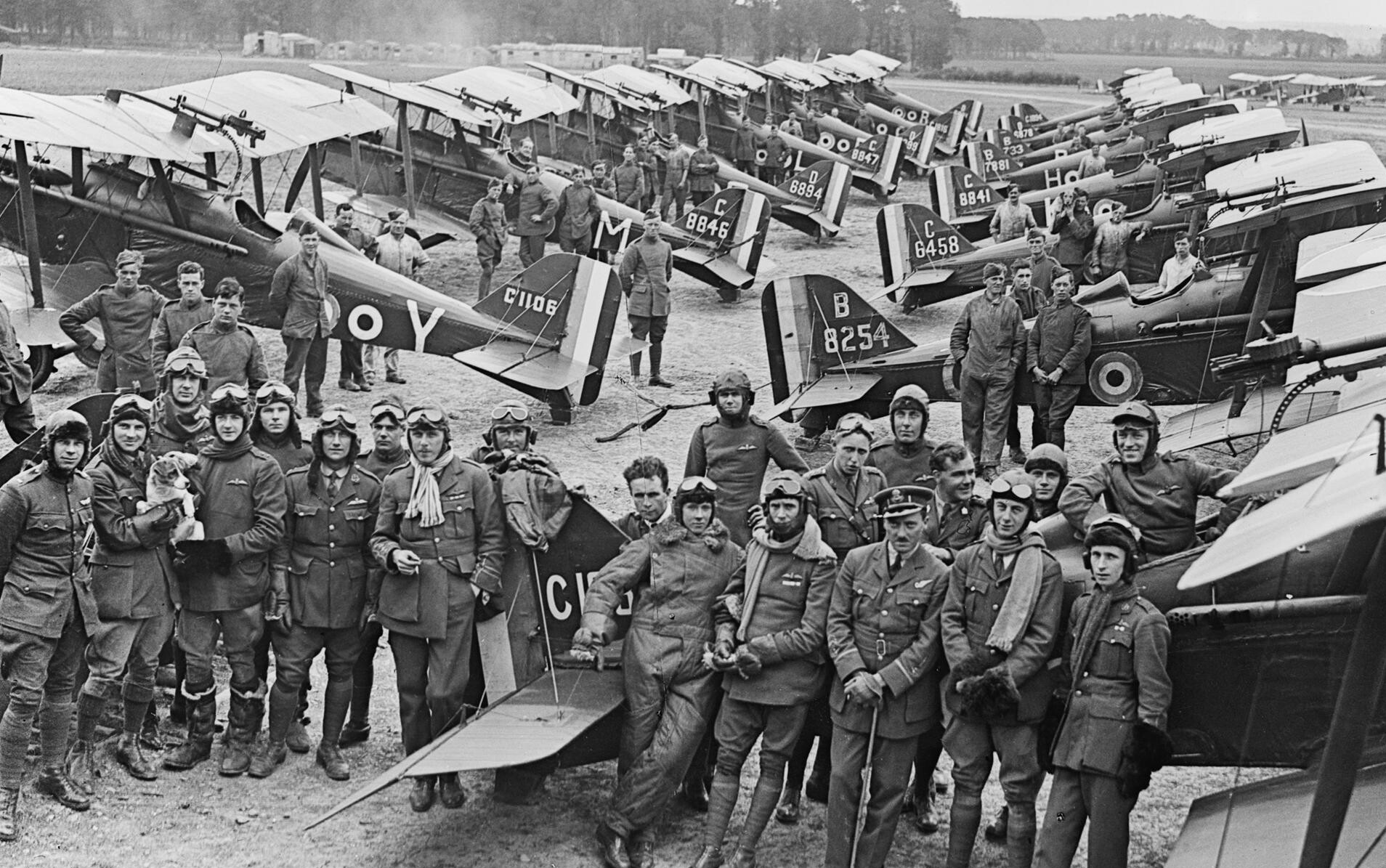
Officers of No 1 Squadron, RAF with SE5a biplanes at Clairmarais aerodrome, near Ypres, July 1918

This is a list of personnel numbers in the Royal Air Force, from its inception in 1918, up until the modern day. Royal Air Force staffing numbers have fluctuated with periodic demand, however, since the end of the Second World War, numbers have decreased steadily and the RAF itself has shrunk in terms of operating bases. Several schemes have been implemented during times of excess staffing to reduce numbers.

== History ==
Several programmes were introduced over the life of the Royal Air Force with a view to either reducing, or increasing personnel in line with current threats, or loss of a perceived threat, such as after the First and Second World Wars. Other programmes were developed outside of conflict such as the Options for Change in 1990 (end of the Cold War), and the Defence Costs Study (or Front Line First) in 1994. Post–First World War saw a huge reduction in staffing and aircraft, though recruitment did continue apace. One notable exception was the Women's Royal Air Force (WRAF) which was disbanded completely in 1920. At Armistice Day in 1918, the fledgling Royal Air Force consisted of a combined personnel of 291,170, which was expected to be reduced to 60,000 by 1 October 1919. In fact, by October 1919, the numbers had dropped to 58,000, increasing fears within the Royal Air Force that it would cease to be an independent air force, and be subsumed into either the Navy or the Army. In 1925, the government announced plans to temporarily cease the expansion of the RAF, and it dropped in numbers between 1926 and 1927 from 33,500 to 33,009.

In response to German re-armament, particularly that of the Luftwaffe, an expansion of the RAF was announced in May 1935, stating a near trebling of aircraft and staff by the end of the next financial year (31 March 1937), resulting in an additional 22,500 personnel.

A re-assessment of necessary staffing after the end of the Cold War, prompted a Defence review called Options for Change. This scaled the Air Force at 75,000, having previously had a strength up to 1990 of 88,500. However, further cuts were implemented during 1993 which were not part of the original Options paper after natural wastage did not produce enough of a drop in numbers, and with the additional loss of one Tornado squadron in the meantime; estimates were recalculated to 70,000. Large swathes of redundancies were served upon all three strands of the UK military structure in 1995. This saw at least 9,000 redundancies, of which, 7,500 were in the Royal Air Force alone.

Full time personnel were offset in loss of numbers by the uplift of Reserve Personnel as per a government directive to increase the number of reservists. This can be seen by the increase of reservists, of which the percentage of reservists expanded two and half times over between October 2013 and October 2021.

== Example personnel numbers ==
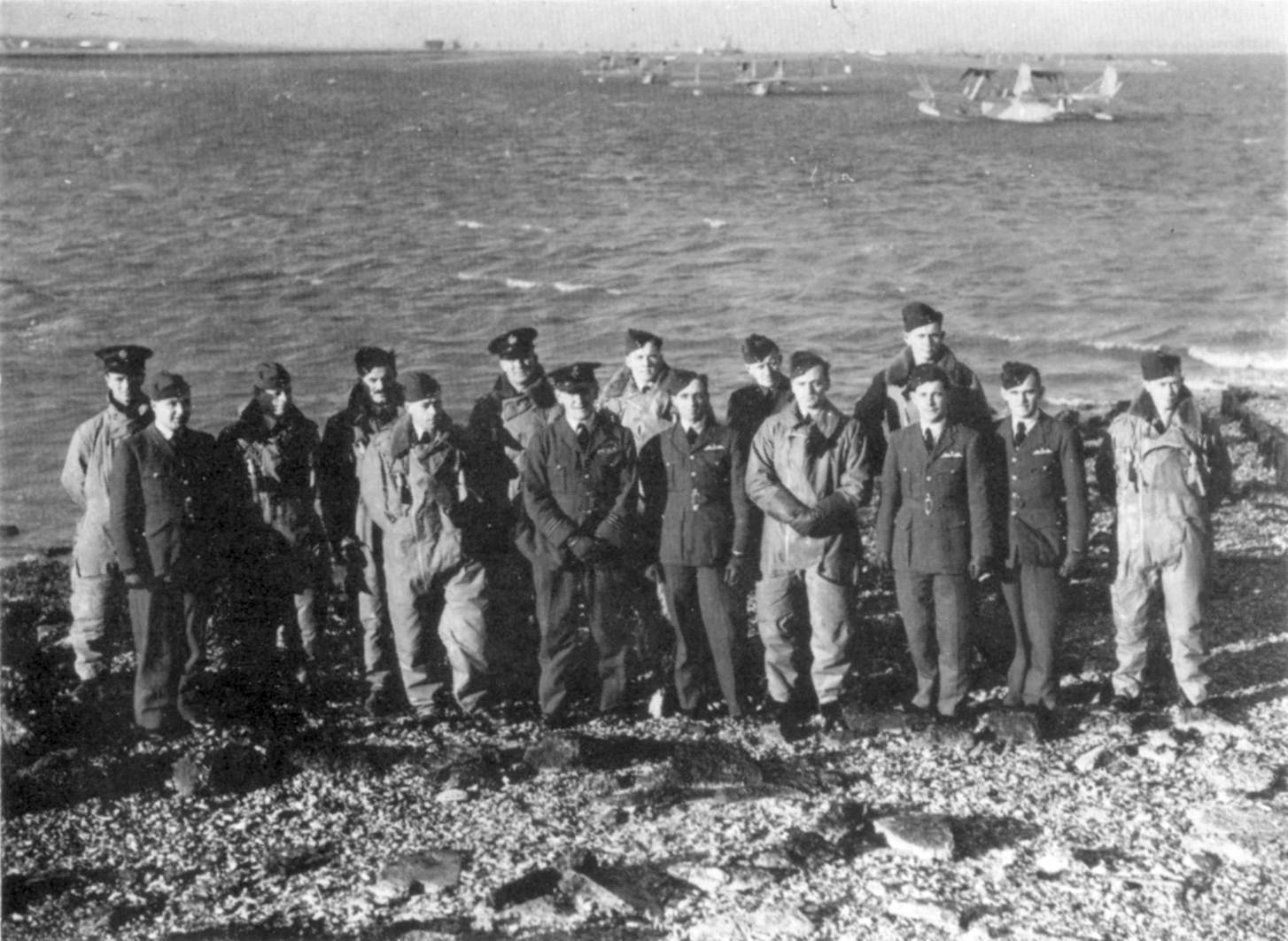
RAF personnel, Calshot, 1936; the RAF had just over 32,000 personnel

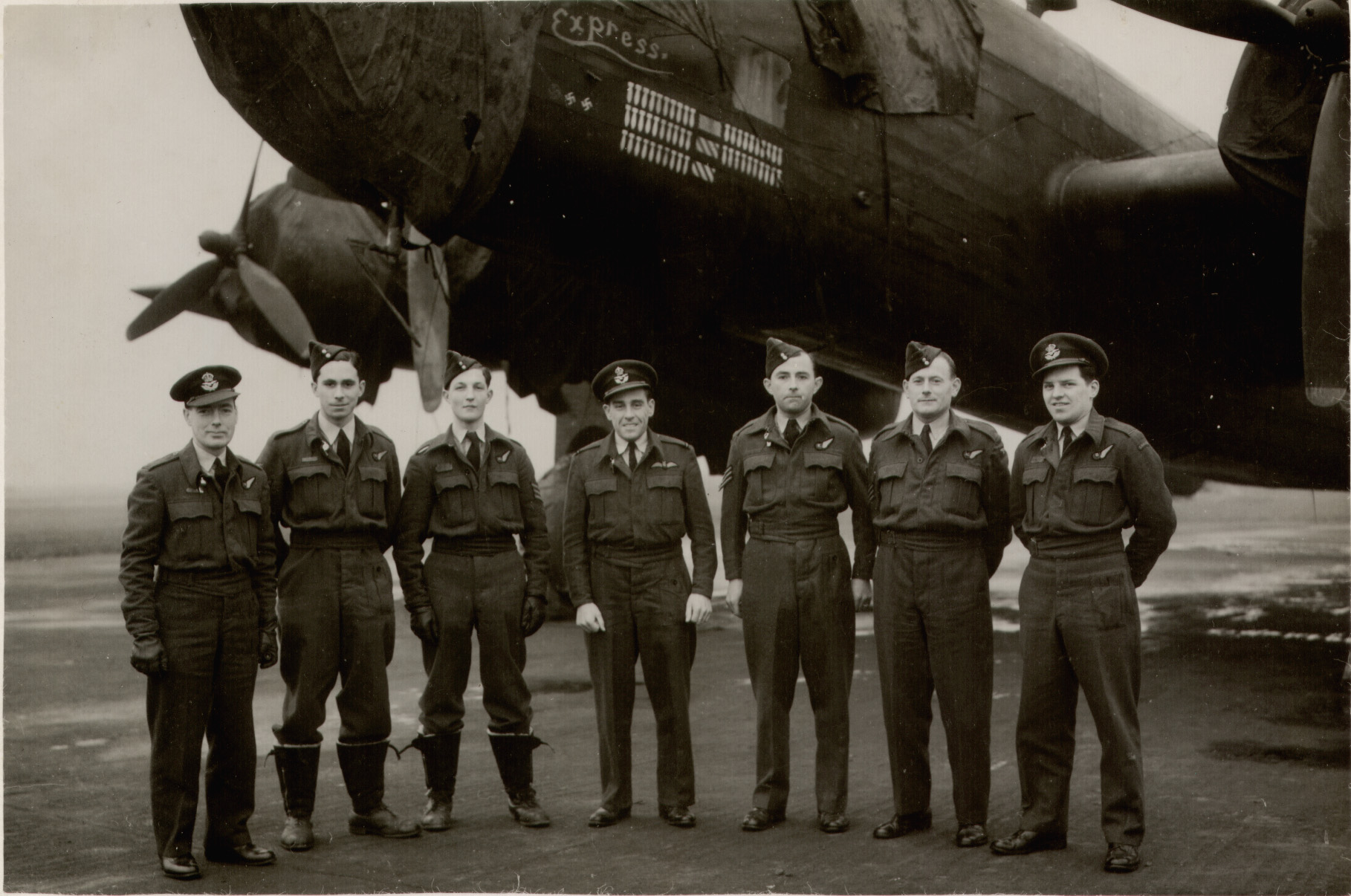
No. 640 Sqn at RAF Leconfield, December 1944. At this time, numbers of personnel were over one million

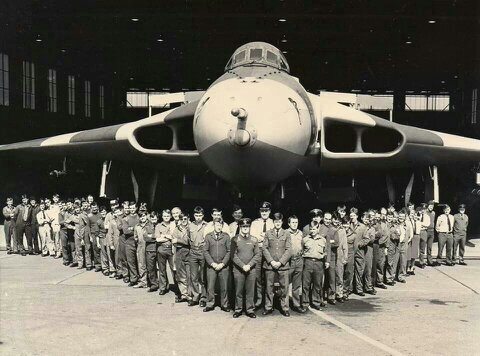
The Vulcan at RAF Waddington, 1982. Post the Falklands Conflict, the RAF had just over 89,000 people in service.

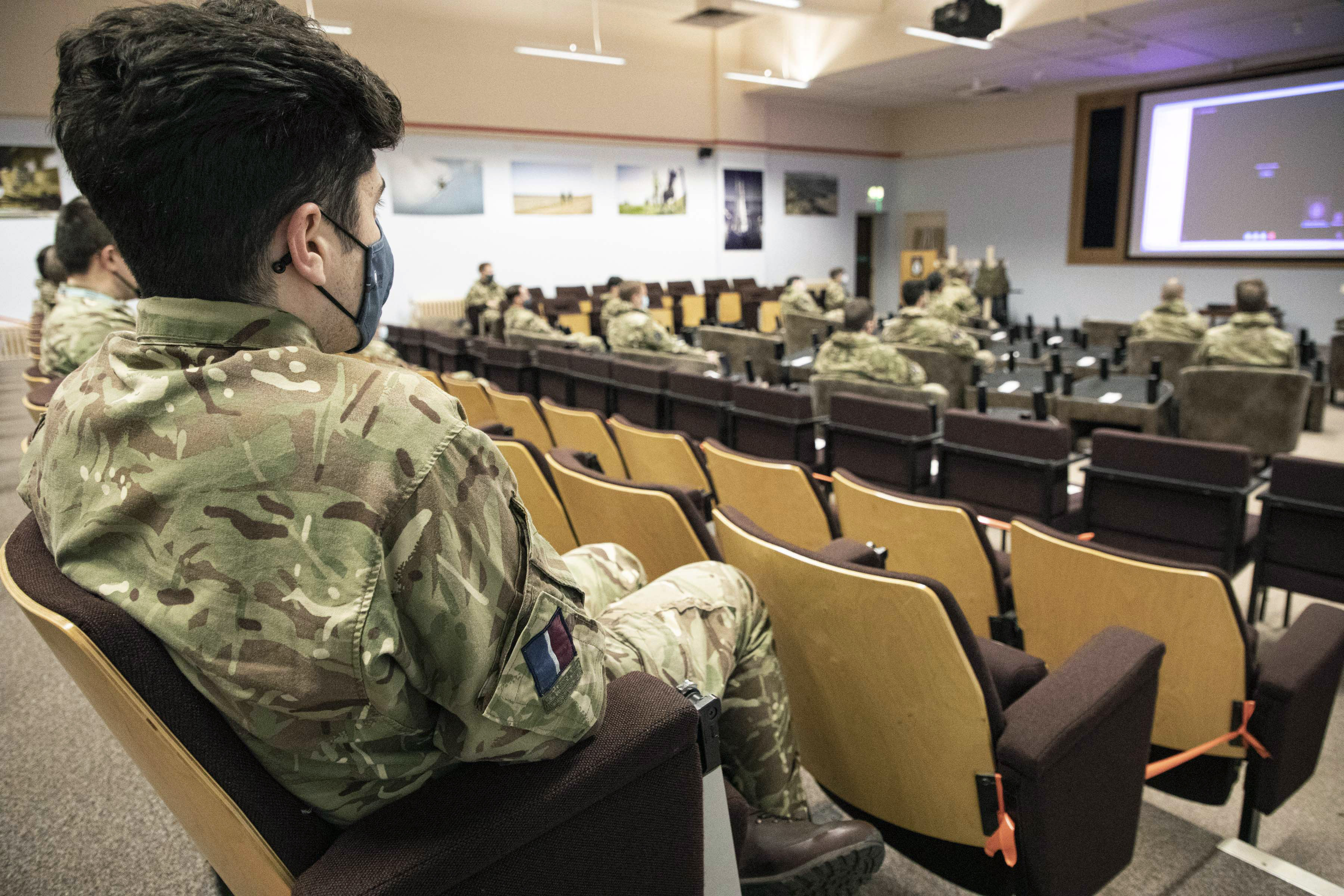
RAF 7 Force Protection Wing delivers training to support mass school testing in 2021. During the COVID-19 Pandemic, personnel numbered around 33,000

Date	Numbers	Notes	Ref
November 1918	291,170	To reduce to around 60,000 by late 1919	
April 1919	149,196	17,267 officers, 108,753 other ranks, the remainder were WRAF	
October 1919	58,000		
January 1920	26,682	After the demobilisation, the strength of the RAF was one tenth of what it was at the Armistice	
1927	33,009 (Note: Not including those who were serving in India.)	Down from 35,300 in 1926	
1929	28,638	3,338 officers, 25,300 other ranks	
January 1934	30,381	3,334 officers, 25,170 other ranks, 1,877 apprentices and cadets	
May 1936	32,456	Increase during the expansion period	
September 1939	175,392	Around 118,000 estimated to be in all areas of operation apart from India	
April 1944	1,185,913	88,615 officers, 922,892 other ranks, 174,406 WRAF	
May 1945	1,079,835		
1952	270,000		
April 1958	210,000	A cut of 20,000 personnel from April 1957.	
1960	163,800	73,000 civilians	
1962	148,000		
1970	108,800	15,400 civilians	
1976	96,300		
September 1978	84,792		
September 1979	87,392		
1981	91,965		
September 1982	89,254		
April 1989	93,100	14,400 officers, 72,500 other ranks, 6,200 WRAF (Note: In 1994, the WRAF was disbanded again, with most serving personnel moved into the RAF.)	
July 1990	89,000		
1993	70,000		
April 1997	57,000	Planned reduction to 56,000 by 1999	
2000	52,000		
December 2004	48,900	Defence cuts estimated that a reduction of almost 8,000 to 41,000 by 2008	
January 2018	36,960		
January 2021	32,920		
April 2022	33,320	The numbers do not consist of reservist personnel. The Defence in a Competitive Age paper from the UK Government expects the RAF to number 31,750.	
January 2026	35,300		
