= Independent Commission for Aid Impact =

- ICAI
- Formation: May 2011
- Purpose: Examination of the impact of UK Official Development Assistance
- Chief Commissioner: Jillian Popkins
- Staff: 11 and external supplier
- Website: https://icai.independent.gov.uk/

The Independent Commission for Aid Impact (ICAI) is an independent non-departmental public body tasked with the scrutiny of British Official development assistance (ODA).

Launched in May 2011 by then Secretary of State for International Development Andrew Mitchell, the body scrutinises and reports on the effectiveness of British ODA, focusing on the work of the Department for International Development (DFID) and other government departments that disperse ODA. It however, does not cover ODA provided by devolved governments, that is, the Scottish and Welsh governments. ICAI's current Chief Commissioner is Dr Tamsyn Barton.

ICAI's work is monitored by the Sub-Committee on the work of the Independent Commission for Aid Impact part of the International Development Committee. ICAI hires a service provider, Agulhas Applied Knowledge, to carry out its work on its behalf, and has also worked with KPMG, Concerto Partners LLP and the Swedish Institute for Public Administration.

It was announced that ICAI would remain as a monitoring agency as the Foreign & Commonwealth Office merged with the Department for International Development to form the Foreign, Commonwealth and Development Office.

The UK government is in the process of reviewing ICAI's remit as it did in a 2017 tailored review. The International Development Committee similarly is investigating ICAI's performance between 2019 and 2020 and its future.
