= National Security Strategy (United Kingdom) =

The National Security Strategies of the United Kingdom have periodically set out the security risks that the UK faces and detailed how the government of the day plans or has planned to address such risks. The most recent National Security Strategy was published on 24 June 2025.

== List of National Security Strategy Papers ==
=== National Security Strategy 2008 ===
The UK government's first National Security Strategy, 'The National Security Strategy of the United Kingdom: Security in an interdependent world', was released by the Cabinet Office in March 2008 under the Labour Party-led Government.

=== National Security Strategy 2009 ===
The 2008 Paper was updated in 2009, under the heading 'Security for the Next Generation'.

=== National Security Strategy 2010 ===
The UK government's second National Security Strategy was published in October 2010 under the Conservative-Liberal Democrat Government. It was titled "A Strong Britain in an Age of Uncertainty". It outlines threats facing the United Kingdom, and defences against these threats. It emphasised the risks posed by terrorism, cyberwarfare, international military crises, and natural disasters.

==== 2011 Update to the National Security Strategy 2010 ====
The National Security Strategy promised an "annual report of progress on implementation" of the National Security Strategy and Strategic Defence and Security Review. The annual progress report was eventually published in December 2011 as The Strategic Defence and Security Review: First Annual Report. It focuses on the Government implementation of the SDSR, for example progress in reducing defence capabilities and bringing troops back from Germany. There is some coverage of recent events, for example the conflict Libya, work in Afghanistan and the deaths of Osama Bin Laden and Anwar Al Awlaki. It also looks at domestic issues such as the new CONTEST and Prevent strategies, and security for the Olympics. It reports on developments in the FCO network and the DFID Official Development Assistance programme and there is also an update on the UK’s alliances.

However the Joint Committee criticised the document for being "almost unrelentingly positive". It noted that it contains no details on areas where there have been delays or problems, even where those have been very high profile and that it contained no lessons learned, not even those already set out in other government papers.

==== 2012 Update to the National Security Strategy 2010 ====
In December 2012 the Government published the 2012 update titled Annual report on the National Security Strategy and Strategic Defence and Security Review. The 2012 Update was over twice as long as the 2011 version and covered a much wider range of topics than the 2011 report, including details on the NSS, the SDSR and a range of security threats and challenges facing the UK.

The Joint Committee on the National Security Strategy published a press release in which the Chair of the Committee said:

We welcome this year's Annual report on the National Security Strategy and Strategic Defence and Security Review which is much broader and more wide-ranging than last year's report. However we regret the fact that it is not yet as complete, transparent, and strategic as it could be. We hope the Government will take the opportunity in next year's report to focus more on the strategic aspects of events; for example this year's report ignores the strategic impact of the Eurozone crisis. It also glosses over other problems the Government has encountered this year. Omitting altogether difficulties such as the numerous problems there have been with Border Security in the last year fools no-one.

==== Response to the 2010 NSS: Joint Committee on the National Security Strategy ====
The Joint Committee on the National Security Strategy was formed to monitor the NSS. This committee formerly "brings together 22 members of both the House of Commons and the House of Lords - including the chairs of the relevant Commons departmental select committees - to consider the 2010 National Security Strategy. It has the terms of reference are "to consider the National Security Strategy". The committee formerly consisted of 12 members from the House of Commons and 10 members of the House of Lords.

The Committee published its first report First review of the National Security Strategy 2010 on 8 March 2012. The report addresses the National Security Strategy, the National Security Council (and the secretariat which supports it), and the National Security Adviser. It was agreed unanimously. The Committee welcomed the National Security Strategy but said that it was work in progress and needed to be improved. In a press release sent out with the report it said that:

- There is no evidence that the NSS has influenced decisions made since the Strategic Defence and Security Review. If the current strategy is not guiding choices then it needs to be revised.
- There should be an "overarching strategy", a document designed to guide government decision-making and crisis management both at home and on the international stage.
- The Government’s assertion that there will be no reduction in the UK's influence on the world stage is "wholly unrealistic in the medium to long term" and the UK needs to plan for a changing, and more partnership-dependent, role in the world.

It also said that the Government's unwillingness to provide it with all the information it had asked for about the National Security Risk Assessment means that it was unable to give Parliament any assurances about its adequacy.

=== National Security Strategy and Strategic Defence and Security Review 2015 ===
The UK presented its third NSS in November 2015 under the Conservative-led government. It combined it with its Strategic Defence and Security Review to form a single policy white paper. It is titled "A Secure and Prosperous United Kingdom".

=== National Security Strategy 2025 ===
The most recent National Security Strategy was published by Keir Starmer's government on 24 June 2025. It warned that the country must "actively prepare for the possibility of the UK coming under direct threat, potentially in a wartime scenario". Cabinet Office minister Pat McFadden was responsible for presenting the strategy to the House of Commons.
