= Department for International Development =

Former department of the UK government

Department for International Development Welsh: Yr Adran Datblygu Rhyngwladol

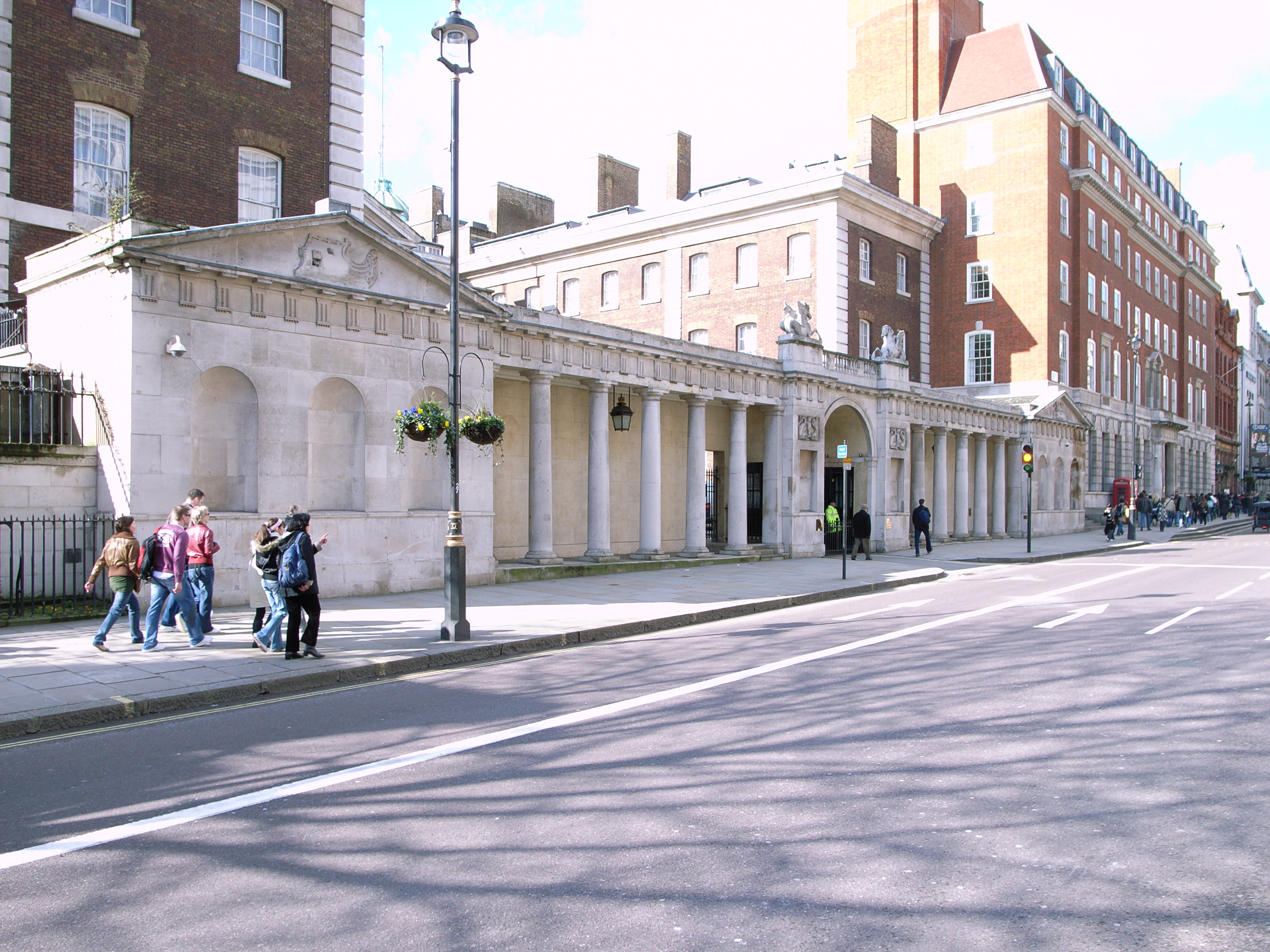
- Department for International Development (London office) (far right)

Department overview
- Formed: 1997
- Preceding agencies: Ministry of Overseas Development; Overseas Development Administration
- Dissolved: 2 September 2020
- Superseding Department: Foreign, Commonwealth and Development Office
- Jurisdiction: United Kingdom
- Headquarters: 22 Whitehall, London, England East Kilbride, Scotland
- Annual budget: £13.4 billion
- Website: gov.uk/dfid

The Department for International Development (DFID) was a ministerial department of the government of the United Kingdom, from 1997 to 2020. It was responsible for administering foreign aid internationally.

The DFID was founded by the UK government in 1997. The department was established by the Labour government under Prime Minister Tony Blair. The goal of the department was "to promote sustainable development and eliminate world poverty". DFID was headed by the United Kingdom's secretary of state for international development. The position was last held by Anne-Marie Trevelyan, who assumed office on 13 February 2020 and served until the department was dissolved on 2 September 2020. In a 2010 report by the Development Assistance Committee, the department was described as "an international development leader in times of global crisis". The UK aid logo is often used to publicly acknowledge DFID's development programmes are funded by UK taxpayers.

The DFID's main programme areas of work were education, health, social services, water supply and sanitation, government and civil society, economic sector (including infrastructure, production sectors and developing planning), environment protection, research, and humanitarian assistance. The department was scrutinized by the International Development Committee.

In June 2020, Prime Minister Boris Johnson announced that the DFID was to be merged with the Foreign Office to create the Foreign, Commonwealth and Development Office.

== Secretaries of State ==
The final permanent secretary was Matthew Rycroft, who assumed office in January 2018.

== Mission ==
The main piece of legislation governing the department's work was the International Development Act 2002, which came into force on 17 June 2002, replacing the Overseas Development and Co-operation Act 1980. The act made poverty reduction the focus of the department's work, and effectively outlawed tied aid.

As well as responding to disasters and emergencies, the department worked to support the United Nations' eight Millennium Development Goals with a 2015 deadline, namely to:

- Halve the number of people living in extreme poverty and hunger
- Ensure that all children receive primary education
- Promote sexual equality and give women a stronger voice
- Reduce child death rates
- Improve the health of mothers
- Combat HIV and AIDS, malaria and other diseases
- Make sure the environment is protected
- Build a global partnership for those working in development.

== History ==
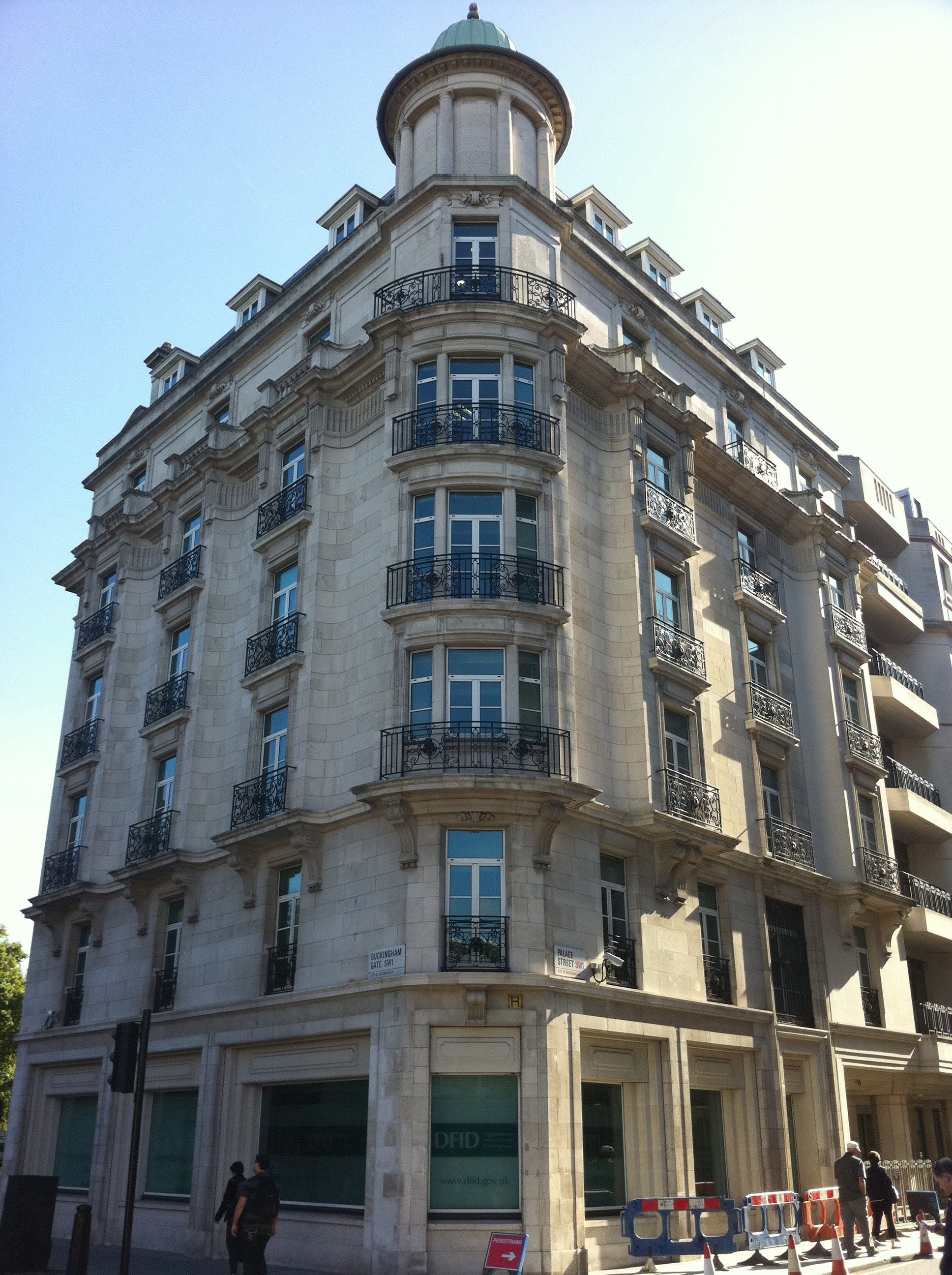
The department's old headquarters in London

The department had its origins in the "Ministry of Overseas Development" created during the Labour government of 1964–1970, which combined the functions of the Department of Technical Cooperation and the overseas aid policy functions of the Foreign, Commonwealth Relations, and Colonial Offices and of other government departments.

Over its history, the Department for International Development and its predecessors have been independent departments or part of the Foreign Office. After the election of a Conservative government in October 1970, the Ministry of Overseas Development was renamed the "Overseas Development Administration" (ODA) and incorporated into the Foreign Office. The ODA was overseen by a minister of state in the Foreign Office who was accountable to the Foreign Secretary. Though it became a section of the Foreign Office, the ODA was relatively self-contained with its own minister, and the policies, procedures, and staff remained largely intact.

When a Labour government was returned to office in 1974, it announced that there would once again be a separate "Ministry of Overseas Development" with its own minister. From June 1975 the powers of the minister for overseas development were formally transferred to the Foreign Secretary.

In 1977, partly to shore up its difficult relations with UK business, the government introduced the Aid and Trade Provision. This enabled aid to be linked to nonconcessionary export credits, with both aid and export credits tied to procurement of British goods and services. Pressure for this provision from UK businesses and the Department of Trade and Industry arose in part because of the introduction of French mixed credit programmes, which had begun to offer French government support from aid funds for exports, including for projects in countries to which France had not previously given substantial aid.

After the election of the Conservatives under Margaret Thatcher in 1979, the ministry was transferred back to the Foreign Office, as a functional wing again named the Overseas Development Administration. The ODA continued to be represented in the cabinet by the Foreign Secretary while the Minister for Overseas Development, who had day-to-day responsibility for development matters, held the rank of minister of state within the Foreign Office.

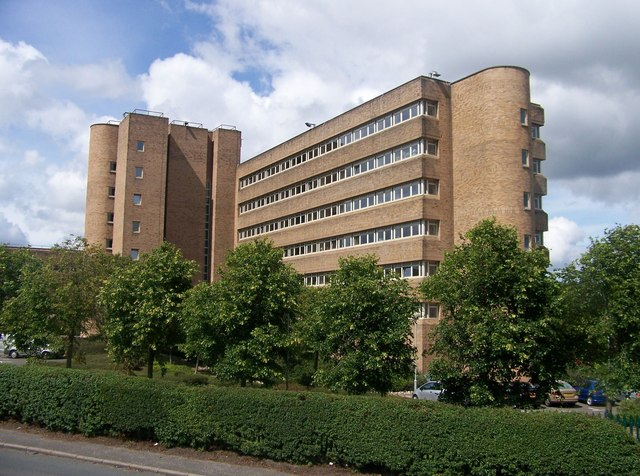
Department for International Development building in Hairmyres, East Kilbride

In the early 1980s, part of the agency's operations was relocated to East Kilbride in Scotland, with a view to creating jobs in an area subject to long-term industrial decline.

In 1997, the department was separated again from the Foreign Office, when a Labour government returned under Tony Blair. Labour also reduced the amount of aid tied to purchasing British goods and services, which had often led to aid being spent ineffectually. In September 2020, the department and the Foreign Office were yet again merged to form the Foreign, Commonwealth and Development Office by Boris Johnson's Conservative government.

The DFID or ODA's role has been under:

	In Cabinet	Outside Cabinet
Separate government department	1964–1967; 1997–2020	1961–1964; 1967–70; 1974–1975
Answerable to the Foreign and Commonwealth Office (FCO)/Foreign, Commonwealth and Development Office (FCDO, renamed as of 2020)	1975–1976; 2020–2026	1970–1974; 1977–79; 1979–1997; 2026–present

Logo used by the department in development programmes

As of 2008, along with the Nordic countries, the DFID generally avoided setting up its own programmes, in order to avoid creating unnecessary bureaucracy. To achieve this, the DFID distributed most of its money to governments and other international organisations that had already developed suitable programmes, and let them distribute the money as efficiently as possible. In July 2009, the DFID rebranded all its aid programmes with the "UK aid" logo, to make clear the contributions were coming from the people of the United Kingdom. While the decision was met with some controversy among aid workers at the time, Commons International Development Select Committee Chairman Malcolm Bruce explained the rebranding, saying "the name DFID does not reflect the fact that this is a British organisation; it could be anything. The Americans have USAID, Canada has got CIDA."

The 2009 National Audit Office Performance Management review looked at how the DFID had restructured its performance management arrangements over the last six years. The report responded to a request from the DFID's Accounting Officer to re-visit the topic periodically, which the Comptroller and Auditor General agreed would be valuable. The study found that the DFID had improved in its general scrutiny of progress in reducing poverty and of progress towards divisional goals, however noted that there was still clear scope for further improvement.

In March 2010, DFID published a "Programme Strategy" concerned with "clearing landmines and other explosive remnants of war" over the period from 2010 to 2013. The HALO Trust unsuccessfully challenged a DFID contract award for mine clearance in Cambodia in the High Court the following year.

In 2016, the DFID was taken to task with accusations of misappropriation of funding in the British Overseas Territory of Montserrat. Whistleblower Sean McLaughlin commenced legal action against the department in the Eastern Caribbean Court, questioning the DFID fraud investigation process.

In June 2020, Prime Minister Boris Johnson announced that the Department for International Development and the Foreign and Commonwealth Office would be brought together to form the Foreign, Commonwealth and Development Office from 1 September the same year, centralising oversight of Britain's foreign aid budget. The stated aim, according to Johnson, was to "unite our aid with our diplomacy and bring them together in our international effort". Three former British Prime Ministers (David Cameron, Gordon Brown and Tony Blair) criticised the plan. Johnson merged the two departments together in September 2020, forming the Foreign, Commonwealth and Development Office.

In criticism of the merge, Opposition leader Keir Starmer kept the shadow department and its ministers in place until the November 2021 shadow cabinet reshuffle. It was speculated that following the Labour Party's victory at the 2024 elections, that the DFID could be reestablished as a ministry of its own once more, although this never occurred.

=== Pergau Dam ===
When it was the Overseas Development Administration, a scandal erupted concerning the department's funding of a hydroelectric dam on the Pergau River in Malaysia, near the Thai border. Building work had begun in 1991 with money from the British foreign aid budget. Concurrently, the Malaysian government bought around £1 billion worth of arms from British dealers, and thus became the subject of a UK government inquiry from March 1994.

=== Ethiopia ===
In February 2015, the DFID ended its financial support for a controversial development project alleged to have helped the Ethiopian government fund a brutal resettlement programme. Four million people were forced off their land by security forces while their homes and farms were sold to foreign investors.

In early 2017 the department ended £5.2 million of support for the all-girl Ethiopian acting and pop group Yegna, called "Ethiopia's Spice Girls", citing concerns about the effectiveness and value for money of the programme.

== Budget ==
World map showing the amount of country-specific UK ODA received by each country per capita in 2015

C8: Specific Bilateral ODA
Country	DfID	ex-DfID
Afghanistan	178,098.8	19,444.3
Albania	0.0	540.4
Algeria	0.0	9,772.3
Angola	0.0	915.9
Anguilla	0.0	0.0
Antigua and Barbuda	0.0	2.6
Argentina	0.0	960.7
Armenia	0.0	972.9
Azerbaijan	0.0	2,100.4
Bangladesh	202,634.3	5,610.4
Belarus	0.0	471.7
Belize	0.0	973.0
Bolivia	0.0	684.8
Bosnia and Herzegovina	0.0	3,506.2
Botswana	0.0	498.5
Brazil	0.0	10,168.6
Burkina Faso	89.9	333.3
Burundi	6,006.2	101.7
Cambodia	1,246.1	685.3
Cameroon	10,000.0	43,539.7
Cape Verde	0.0	79.8
Central African Republic	15,797.0	267.6
Chile	0.0	1,588.9
China	0.0	-33,505.2
Colombia	0.0	6,874.2
Comoros	0.0	6.3
Congo Democratic Republic	164,104.3	2,489.3
Costa Rica	0.0	3,686.9
Cote d'Ivoire	0.0	2,031.6
Cuba	0.0	3,957.3
Dominica	0.0	0.3
Dominican Republic	0.0	408.6
Ecuador	0.0	244.0
Egypt	561.1	-24,565.5
El Salvador	0.0	212.2
Eritrea	5,590.0	287.3
Ethiopia	316,498.1	5,253.1
Fiji	0.0	1,085.6
Former Yugoslav Republic of Macedonia (FYROM)	0.0	2,139.3
Gabon	0.0	-220.6
Gambia	0.0	9,894.0
Georgia	0.0	4,337.5
Ghana	58,075.9	8,333.4
Grenada	0.0	0.8
Guatemala	0.0	1,077.3
Guinea	0.0	280.6
Guinea-Bissau	0.0	73.5
Guyana	670.5	371.5
Haiti	4,627.0	58.2
Honduras	0.0	26.9
India	188,040.2	91,019.8
Indonesia	14,227.0	1,563.1
Iran	0.0	658.9
Iraq	29,462.7	8,907.8
Jamaica	2,262.0	3,915.4
Jordan	10,065.1	8,473.2
Kazakhstan	0.0	1,782.2
Kenya	116,794.0	18,234.9
Kiribati	0.0	17.7
Korea, Democratic Republic of	0.0	277.2
Kosovo	0.0	5,839.2
Kyrgyz Republic	4,109.7	1,842.0
Laos	765.0	707.9
Lebanon	18,744.9	7,264.0
Lesotho	-27.7	232.5
Liberia	5,603.6	192.2
Libya	2,345.9	26,317.2
Madagascar	0.0	-199.0
Malawi	51,069.5	9,579.4
Malaysia	0.0	-1,761.7
Maldives	0.0	-52.7
Mali	215.7	1,886.0
Mauritania	330.0	241.2
Mauritius	0.0	744.6
Mexico	0.0	-958.7
Moldova	0.0	1,463.6
Mongolia	0.0	444.3
Montenegro	0.0	506.5
Montserrat	19,594.9	707.1
Morocco	0.0	7,968.9
Mozambique	81,807.9	2,158.6
Myanmar	69,970.7	3,307.3
Namibia	0.0	285.2
Nauru	0.0	15.0
Nepal	109,843.6	2,054.8
Nicaragua	0.0	73.7
Niger	0.0	110.1
Nigeria	226,409.7	10,321.4
Pakistan	240,360.9	25,963.4
Panama	0.0	447.7
Papua New Guinea	0.0	1,096.9
Paraguay	0.0	149.9
Peru	0.0	98.2
Philippines	54,199.4	1,822.7
Rwanda	46,290.4	1,737.3
São Tomé and Príncipe	0.0	95.2
Senegal	230.0	-300.6
Serbia	0.0	2,995.2
Seychelles	0.0	380.0
Sierra Leone	235,110.5	2,636.8
Solomon Islands	300.0	483.7
Somalia	109,445.2	14,346.2
South Africa	11,380.2	-29,443.1
South Sudan	162,226.2	4,833.8
Sri Lanka	1,124.7	4,119.0
Saint Helena	74,774.7	977.2
Saint Kitts and Nevis	0.0	0.0
Saint Lucia	0.0	188.4
Saint Vincent and the Grenadines	0.0	0.2
Sudan	43,713.3	6,199.3
Swaziland	0.0	952.2
Syria	100,734.8	28,896.2
Tajikistan	11,823.6	1,971.2
Tanzania	143,534.3	5,396.5
Thailand	0.0	12,109.2
Timor-Leste	0.0	45.3
Tonga	0.0	7.5
Tunisia	629.0	1,452.7
Turkey	3,879.6	4,605.9
Turkmenistan	0.0	366.0
Uganda	110,696.7	-27,923.6
Ukraine	2,901.4	4,603.6
Uruguay	0.0	237.6
Uzbekistan	0.0	1,238.6
Vanuatu	0.0	11.9
Venezuela	0.0	1,428.3
Vietnam.	10,407.9	4,780.6
West Bank Gaza Strip	75,347.2	8,010.4
Yemen	77,665.4	4,453.8
Zambia	80,929.5	10,129.9
Zimbabwe	95,290.6	8,733.0

In 2009–2010, the DFID's gross public expenditure on Development was £6.65 billion. Of this £3.96 billion was spent on bilateral aid (including debt relief, humanitarian assistance and project funding) and £2.46 billion was spent on multilateral aid, including support to the EU, World Bank, UN and other related agencies. Although the Department for International Development's foreign aid budget was not affected by the cuts outlined by the Chancellor of the Exchequer's 2010 spending review, DFID saw their administration budgets slashed by about 19 per cent over the next four years, a reduction in back-office costs to account for only 2 per cent of their total spend by 2015.

In 2010, the DFID was criticised for spending around £15 million a year in the UK, although this only accounted for 0.25% of its total budget. In 2010, £1.85 million had been given to the Foreign Office to fund the Papal visit of Pope Benedict, although a department spokesman said that "The contribution recognised the Catholic Church's role as a major provider of health and education services in developing countries". There has also been criticism of some spending by international organisations with UNESCO and the FAO being particularly weak. In 2010 the incoming coalition government promised to reduce back-office costs to only 2% of the budget and to improve transparency by publishing more on their website. In 2011, the government were also criticised for increasing the aid budget at a time when other departments were being cut. The head of the conservative pressure group TaxPayers' Alliance said that "The department should at least get the same treatment other high priority areas like science did – a cash freeze would save billions." The budget for 2011–2012 was £6.7 billion including £1.4 billion of capital.

In June 2013, as part of the 2013 Spending Round outcomes, it was announced that the DFID's total programme budget would increase to £10.3 billion in 2014–2015 and £11.1 billion in 2015–2016 to help meet the government's commitment to spend 0.7% of gross national income on official development assistance. The DFID was responsible for the majority of Britain's official development assistance, projected to total £11.7 billion in 2014–2015 and £12.2 billion in 2015–2016.

On 1 April 2015, the Conflict, Stability and Security Fund, a fund of more than £1 billion per year for tackling conflict and instability abroad, was created under the control of the National Security Council, and £823 million was transferred from the DFID budget to the fund, £739 million of which was then administered by the Foreign and Commonwealth Office and £42 million by the Ministry of Defence. Subsequently, concern was expressed in the media that Britain's aid budget was being spent on defence and foreign policy objectives and to support the work of other departments.

In November 2015, the DFID released a new policy document titled "UK aid: tackling global challenges in the national interest".

According to the OECD, the official development assistance from the United Kingdom increased to USD 15.7 billion (preliminary data) in 2022 due to an increase in gross national income and additional funding for in-donor refugee costs. Official development assistance represented 0.51% of gross national income.

=== International grants table ===
The following table lists committed funding from the DFID for the top 15 sectors, as recorded in the department's International Aid Transparency Initiative (IATI) publications. The DFID joined the IATI in January 2011 but also records grants before that point. The sectors use the names from the DAC 5 Digit Sector list.

	Committed funding (£ millions)								
Sector	Before 2011	2011	2012	2013	2014	2015	2016	2017	Sum
Material relief assistance and services	527.6	213.2	318.3	494.1	758.1	492.0	231.1	0.0	3,034.4
Emergency food aid	479.0	181.7	347.4	269.6	353.3	137.4	148.2	0.0	1,916.5
Primary education	856.2	521.8	474.7	91.2	44.3	49.3	216.9	0.0	2,254.4
Social/ welfare services	980.6	268.4	225.8	376.6	32.3	235.8	40.3	0.0	2,159.8
Environmental policy and administrative management	400.2	194.3	284.0	107.2	300.8	136.4	113.2	0.0	1,536.2
Public sector policy and administrative management	1,352.4	151.1	249.1	159.0	251.3	109.8	115.6	0.0	2,388.4
Education policy and administrative management	1,153.6	328.4	504.2	64.1	101.1	10.8	6.4	1.5	2,170.1
Multisector aid	753.1	805.0	155.4	8.2	9.6	1.5	0.7	0.0	1,733.5
Relief co-ordination; protection and support services	170.9	71.4	115.6	145.3	320.0	119.8	177.5	0.0	1,120.4
Reproductive health care	720.5	308.6	267.0	161.0	65.8	91.4	47.9	0.0	1,662.2
Small and medium-sized enterprises (SME) development	173.8	16.1	583.2	58.8	147.3	17.2	49.5	0.0	1,046.0
Basic health care	477.3	287.5	165.7	84.3	37.2	179.3	43.8	0.0	1,275.0
Financial policy and administrative management	520.8	51.5	285.4	56.7	101.4	12.3	49.2	0.0	1,077.2
Agricultural development	179.0	142.1	37.4	102.0	161.5	72.2	33.0	0.0	727.1
Family planning	236.8	175.6	136.4	75.7	38.0	44.7	31.1	0.0	738.3
Other	28,828.3	9,225.2	4,636.4	2,479.2	2,217.2	1,521.6	1,611.9	36.9	50,519.9
Total	37,810.1	12,941.7	8,785.8	4,733.0	4,939.3	3,231.6	2,916.4	38.5	75,396.4

== DFID research ==
The DFID was the largest bilateral donor of development-focused research. New science, technologies and ideas were crucial for the achievement of the Millennium Development Goals, but global research investments were insufficient to match needs and do not focus on the priorities of the poor. Many technological and policy innovations required an international scale of research effort. For example, the DFID was a major donor to the International LUBILOSA programme, which developed a biological pesticide for locust control in support of small-holder farmers in the Sahel.

DFID Research commissioned research to help fill this gap, aiming to ensure tangible outcomes on the livelihoods of the poor worldwide. They also sought to influence the international and UK research agendas, putting poverty reduction and the needs of the poor at the forefront of global research efforts.

DFID Research managed long-term research initiatives that cut across individual countries or regions, and only funded activities if there was clear opportunities and mechanisms for the research to have a significant impact on poverty.

Research was funded through a range of mechanisms, including Research Programme Consortia, jointly with other funders of development research, with UK Research Councils and with multilateral agencies (such as the World Bank, Food and Agriculture Organisation, World Health Organisation). Information on both DFID current research programmes and completed research can be found on the (R4D) portal Research4Development. From November 2012 all new DFID-funded research was subjected to its DFID Research Open and Enhanced Access Policy. International Development Secretary Andrew Mitchell declared that this will ensure "that these findings get into the hands of those in the developing world who stand to gain most from putting them into practical use".

The DFID launched its first Research Strategy in April 2008. This emphasised the DFID's commitment to funding high quality research that aims to find solutions and ways of reducing global poverty. The new strategy identified six priorities:

- Growth
- Health
- Sustainable agriculture
- Climate change
- Governance in challenging environments
- Future challenges and opportunities

The strategy also highlighted three important cross-cutting areas, where the DFID would invest more funding:

- Capacity building
- Research communication and uptake
- Stimulating demand for research

== See also ==
- List of development aid agencies
- Stabilisation Unit
- Adaptation at Scale in Semi-Arid Regions
