= List of historical acts of tax resistance =

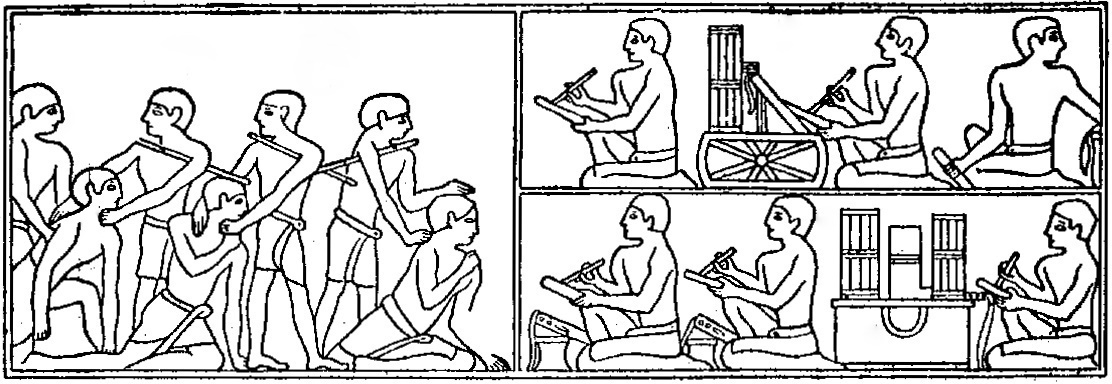
Egyptian peasants seized for non-payment of taxes during the Old Kingdom

Tax resistance, the practice of refusing to pay taxes that are considered unjust, has probably existed ever since rulers began imposing taxes on their subjects. It has been suggested that tax resistance played a significant role in the collapse of several empires, including the Egyptian, Roman, Spanish, and Aztec.

Many rebellions and revolutions have been prompted by resentment of taxation or had tax refusal as a component. Examples of historic events that originated as tax revolts include the Magna Carta, the American Revolution, and the French Revolution.

This page is a partial list of global tax revolts and tax resistance actions that have come to the attention of Wikipedia's editors. This includes actions in which a person or people refused to pay a tax of some sort, either through passive resistance or by actively obstructing the tax collector or collecting authorities, and actions in which people boycotted some taxed good or activity or engaged in a strike to reduce or eliminate the tax due.

== Examples ==
=== Before 1500 A.D. ===
==== Jewish Zealots, 1st century A.D. ====
In the 1st century AD, Jewish Zealots in Judaea resisted the poll tax instituted by the Roman Empire. Jesus was accused of promoting tax resistance prior to his torture and execution ("We found this fellow perverting the nation, and forbidding to give tribute to Cæsar, saying that he himself is Christ a King" – Luke 23:2). After the destruction of the temple in Jerusalem in 70 AD, Jews, particularly those exiled to Egypt, refused to pay the still-extant "temple tax" to Rome (which it was using to maintain pagan temples); Rome responded by destroying Jewish temples.

==== Limoges, 578 ====
In 578 AD residents of Limoges, encouraged by the local clergy, rioted, destroying tax-collecting paraphernalia and threatening the assessor. The government responded harshly, with punishments including torture and crucifixion, though Queen Fredegund later was said to have repented and rescinded the tax.

==== Peace and Truce of God, 1027 ====
In councils organized by the Peace and Truce of God movement, Christian clergy resisted the exaction of taxes against church property by warlords.

==== Danegeld, 1041 ====
In 1041, residents of Worcester rebelled against the Danegeld being collected by King Harthacnut, and killed two of his tax collectors. Harthacnut responded by burning Worcester to the ground.

==== Constantinople, 1197 ====
When Alexios III Angelos tried to tax residents of Constantinople to come up with money to pay protection money to Henry VI, the people of Constantinople refused to pay, and Alexios was reduced to trying to collect the sum by stripping the ornaments from old tombs.

==== Florence, 1289 ====
A war tax instituted by the Florentine seigniory in 1288 and increased in 1289 led to mass tax resistance that forced the government to abandon the tax.

==== Clericis laicos, 1296 ====
In 1296, Pope Boniface VIII issued the clericis laicos, which prohibited secular governments from taxing churches without the permission of the Pope, and prohibited church officials from paying such taxes. Archbishop Robert Winchelsey used this as the basis for his refusal to pay taxes to Edward I of England, and urged the clergy under his direction to do likewise.

==== Norman anti-tax riots, 1348–51 ====
In Normandy in June 1348, tax resisters attacked the tax collectors of King Philip VI, "pillaging and burning their houses." In August 1351, citizens of Rouen rioted, "destroying 'the counters, boxes, and other objects necessary to make and operate' collection of" a new tax instituted by John II. In 1355, Geoffroy of Harcourt urged residents of Rouen to refuse to pay the hearth tax and allied with Charles the Bad against John II's taxes.

==== Wat Tyler's rebellion, 1381 ====
In 1381 the Peasant's Revolt occurred in England, when Wat Tyler led an uprising over a new poll tax. Tyler marched an army of tens of thousands of peasants from Kent to Canterbury, then to London, beheaded the archbishop, and exacted radical concessions from King Richard II. During the negotiations, Tyler was killed by officers of the King and was publicly beheaded, and Richard II retracted all of the concessions that he had previously made.

==== French aides uprisings, 1381 ====
In 1381 there was widespread tax rebellion in France.

In Rouen workers in the textile trade gathered in the Old Market, chose one of their own to represent the king, and had this mock king sign acts abolishing the aides. In Paris the collectors′ threat to seize a greengrocer's still on the Right Bank roused local residents to assemble, shout "Down with taxes!" and chase off the tax collectors.... The rebellion then spread to Caen and other towns in Normandy and to towns in Picardy, where opposition was especially virulent in Amiens. It moved through Orleans and on to Sens, finally reaching Lyons...

==== Bundschuh movement ====
The Bundschuh movement was in part a tax resistance movement that encouraged its followers to stop paying tithes to the Catholic Church and taxes. In France, a tithe-payer strike spread from 1529 to 1560 among both Catholics and Protestants.

==== Flemish revolt against Maximilian of Austria, 1488 ====
The guilds of Bruges (supported by the other Flemish cities) held later emperor Maximilian captive when he heavily disturbed the economy by raising taxes and seigniorage to wage war. They negotiated better terms and then released him. He then reneged on the agreement and took his armies back to Bruges in revenge. Bruges lost its administrative functions to the city of Ghent.

=== 16th century ===
==== Revolt of the Comuneros, 1520 ====
In Spain, the people of Salamanca in 1520 refused to pay any taxes because of their belief that Charles I was sending the tax money to the Netherlands. They were joined by other towns, which eventually formed the Revolt of the Comuneros.

==== Amicable Grant revolt in England, 1525 ====
Under the leadership of his chief minister Thomas Wolsey, England's King Henry VIII repeatedly raised taxes and imposed forced loans in the 1520s to pay for his large-scale wars in Europe. Finally the call for an "Amicable Grant" of non-repayable loans in 1525 went too far. Parliament had not voted it, and the English landed and financial elites refused to pay. Passive resistance was widespread, there was an attempted revolt in Suffolk and England was on the verge of violent resistance when the program was hurriedly ended. Lack of money ended Henry's plans for an invasion of France, and he took England out of the war with the Treaty of the More on 30 August 1525.

==== German Peasants′ War, 1524–25 ====
The German Peasants' War of 1524–25 was in part a tax resistance campaign. The rebels vowed to set their own tithes, and said:

The small tithes, whether ecclesiastical or lay, we will not pay at all, for the Lord God created cattle for the free use of man. We will not, therefore, pay farther an unseemly tithe which is of man's invention.... Henceforth no one shall have to pay death taxes, whether small or large.

==== Revolt of Ghent, 1539 ====
The Revolt of Ghent began when the city magistrates refused to pay taxes demanded by Charles V for his war with France.

==== Hutterites ====
In the 16th century, Hutterites refused to pay taxes for war or capital punishment. One wrote:

For war, killing, and bloodshed (where it is demanded especially for that) we give nothing, but not out of wickedness or arbitrariness, but out of the fear of God (1 Timothy 5) that we may not be partakers in strange sins.

Another wrote:

[When] the government requires of us what is contrary to our faith and conscience—as swearing oaths and paying hangman's dues or taxes for war—then we do not obey its command.

==== Gabelle revolts, 1542, 1548 ====
Residents of La Rochelle rebelled against the gabelle, or salt tax, in 1542. "[A]rmed rebels thwarted the tax-collecting efforts of two successive visitations of royal commissioners sent out to enforce the [gabelle] edicts." A second revolt centered in Guyenne in 1548 was more organized, widespread, and violent; and was violently suppressed. Also in August 1548, there were violent revolts against the gabelle in Bordeaux in which tax collectors were killed and their homes burnt. The French central government sent in thousands of troops who terrorized the occupants, imposed martial law, and enforced humiliating terms; however, "Amazingly, in the long run, the rebellion did achieve its aim. Unnerved by the riots, Henri II decided not to enforce the salt tax."

==== Tariff resistance in Holland, 1543–49 ====
Merchants in Holland successfully resisted a variety of export duties imposed by the Holy Roman Empire via Mary of Hungary.

==== Tax strikes in France, 1579–80 ====
In Romans-sur-Isère and other parts of Dauphiné, anti-tax leagues formed, which grew into a powerful rebellion that was crushed in the wake of the ambush and murder of many of the rebel leaders by vigilantes during the Carnival of 1580.

==== The Revolt Against the Tribute, Philippines, 1589 ====
In 1589, the provinces of Cagayán, Ilocos Norte, and Ilocos Sur rebelled against unjust Spanish colonial taxes and abusive tax collectors in what became known as the "Revolt Against the Tribute," the "Dingrás Revolt," or the "Ilocos Norte Revolt."

==== Rappenkrieg, 1591–94 ====
In a three-year-long tax refusal campaign called the Rappenkrieg or "farthing war," the residents of Basel, Switzerland refused to pay a tax destined for the bishop.

==== Croquants, 1593–95 ====
Peasant rebels in southwestern France called "croquants" included "refusal to pay tithes, tailles, and rents... and resistance to tax collectors and their agents." A second rebellion in Vivarais at the same time also centered on refusal to pay the taille.

==== Sales tax resistance in France, 1597 ====
A number of towns in France, notably Poitiers, resisted the imposition of a new sales tax by Henry IV in 1597. The King at first stubbornly enforced the tax by force, but eventually decided the expense and fuss was not worth the income and rescinded the tax.

==== Jelali revolts ====
The Jelali revolts were typically inspired by taxes or the action of tax collectors, and included tax resistance strategies, including "The Great Flight"—a sort of mass emigration by peasants from their land to avoid taxes.

=== 17th century ===
==== Bolotnikov rebellion, 1606 ====
During the Bolotnikov rebellion, tribes in western Siberia began refusing to pay taxes to the central government.

==== Brussels, 1619 ====
In the city of Brussels, then part of the Duchy of Brabant in the Habsburg Netherlands, there was a tax strike in 1619. When the States of Brabant (composed of representatives of the clergy, the nobility, and the four cities Leuven, Brussels, Antwerp and 's-Hertogenbosch) met to renew the standard sales tax on the "four species of consumption" (beer, wine, bread and meat), the guilds of the city of Brussels instructed their representatives not to vote the taxes through until their grievances had been addressed. As the constitutional principle was that taxes had to be passed by "full consent", this meant the taxes could not legally be collected. After two months of constitutional impasse and fruitless negotiations (May–June) the government ordered the taxes to be collected notwithstanding. The guilds made this impossible, and their defiance of the government led to a military occupation of the city in September 1619. The central authorities then revised the civic constitution to limit the power of the guilds to filibuster the States of Brabant. The deans of six of the guilds, and their legal counsel, were served with sentences of lifelong banishment from the Low Countries.

==== English Civil War ====
In 1627, John Hampden was imprisoned for his opposition to the loan Charles I has authorised without the approval of Parliament, and he also refused to pay ship money to the Royal Navy. The attempts to imprison resisters like Hampden led to the English Civil War.

From the summer of 1646 through 1648, the City of London refused to pay taxes to the New Model Army which was occupying the city. In a celebrated 1654 case, George Cony refused to pay customs duties that had been instituted by The Protectorate without the consent of Parliament.

==== 17th-century tax rebellions in France ====
In 1615, the residents of one commune refused to pay the wine tithe and threatened to throw the collector into the Rhône.

In Poitiers, France, in 1624 and again on multiple occasions in 1663, mobs attacked inns where French tax farmers were staying, threatening to torch the building and kill those inside.

The success of anti-tax rebellions in Saintonge and Angoumois led to other rebellions in France, including some in which excise officers were lynched. The most notorious incident was the massacre of tax officers responsible for collecting the gabelle at Agen in June 1635.

A second "Croquants′ Revolt" in 1636–37 (with some outbreaks as early as 1628) concerned the taxes being raised to support France's entry into the Thirty Years' War. The revolt included the lynching of tax officials, a tax strike, and a major battle at which over 2,000 people were killed. The major rebellion was defeated, but outbreaks of mass tax resistance continued as late as 1658.

From 1638 to 1645, the residents of Pardiac refused to pay their taxes, rose up to free the officials who had been imprisoned for failure to remit the tax money, repulsed government troops sent to enforce the tax laws, and massacred a tax official and his bodyguard.

In 1639–43, the revolt of the va-nu-pieds in Normandy included a tax strike and attacks on the homes of tax farmers. In 1643 there were attacks on tax collectors in multiple regions of France. The Fronde of 1646–53 was also marked by anti-tax riots.

The revolt of the papier timbré in 1675 was centered on a new stamp tax, and included destruction of tax offices and attacks on tax- and tithe-collectors.

In 1682, a village curate led a tax revolt in which the villagers stoned the monks and the tithe agent who had come to collect a grain tithe.

==== Algonquian resistance, 1637 ====
In 1637, the Algonquian resisted being taxed by Dutch colonialists to pay for improvements to Fort Amsterdam.

==== Italian tax revolts, 1647 ====
Residents of Palermo and of Naples revolted in 1647 and destroyed the tax offices and the homes of tax farmers.

==== Swiss peasant war of 1653 ====
A devaluation of Bernese money caused a tax revolt and the Swiss peasant war of 1653. The war spread from the Entlebuch valley in the Canton of Lucerne to the Emmental valley in the Canton of Bern, to the cantons of Solothurn and Basel, and to the Aargau.

==== Resistance to Cromwell's Taxes-by-Decree, 1654 ====
In 1654, an English merchant named George Cony refused to pay customs duties that had been established by Oliver Cromwell's government without its having bothered to go through Parliament, and thereby called into question the legal underpinnings of the whole regime.

==== Quaker Tithe and War Tax Resistance, 1659– ====
George Fox′s Quaker movement included resistance to tithes and other mandatory fees destined for the establishment church. Soon, the movement also incorporated resistance to militia taxes and fees, and to "trophy money" (taxes for equipping soldiers). These were early examples of war tax resistance in the Quaker movement.

==== Scottish presbyterian dissent, 1678–88 ====
In the 17th century, as the reformation government in Scotland reintroduced a state Episcopal church and brutally cracked down on dissident Presbyterian groups, members of those groups resisted the taxes that were being raised to pay for this repression, and advocated mass tax resistance. (When the Scottish Presbyterians gained the upper hand and became the establishment church of Scotland, the tables were turned, and members of dissident churches began to resist taxes paid for its support.)

==== Resistance in New England, 1687 ====
On 22 August 1687, John Wise met with some of the other "principal inhabitants" of Ipswich in New England, and decided that a new tax that had been imposed by governor Edmund Andros, without consulting the colony's General Assembly, was illegitimate and "that it was not the town's duty any way to assist that ill method of raising money." A town meeting the next day that Andros had called for to select tax commissioners instead issued a declaration against the tax. A number of those at the town meeting were then arrested, hauled to a jail in another town, and then put on trial before a jury hand-picked by the prosecution and a judge who referred to the defendants as "criminals" over the course of the trial.

Fines and court costs followed, and although, at first, the Andros was triumphant, Wise and company eventually succeeded. On 18 April 1689, in the wake of the Glorious Revolution in the home country, a "Declaration of the Gentlemen, Merchants, and Inhabitants of Boston" was issued, which proclaimed the assault on the rights of dissenting English colonists to be part of the same plot of "the great Scarlet Whore" to crush Englishmen under the thumb of the papists (that is, James II of England) again.

Then followed a revolution. Andros and Judge Dudley, who had tried the case against Wise and the rest, were overthrown and imprisoned.

=== 18th century ===
==== Camisard revolt, 1700–03 ====
Tax resistance was a feature of the Camisard revolt.

==== New Jersey resistance to a Catholic assessor, 1715 ====
In 1715, thirty-six New Jersey residents pledged to refuse to pay taxes "Because wee have been Illegally Assessed by an Asseser who being a Known & open profest Roman Catholick which is Utterly Repugnant to the Laws of Great Brittain & Contrary to ye Rights & Liberties of his Royall Majties faithfull Subjects."

==== 18th-century uprisings in Japan ====
Successful peasant uprisings in the Fukuyama fief in 1717 (and again in 1752 and 1770), in the Tsuyama fief in 1726–27, and in Iwaki Daira in 1739, focused on the oppressiveness of taxes and tax collection. Other tax revolts in Aizu in 1749, in Shinano Ueda in 1761–63, in Tenma Sodo in 1764–65, in Koyasan in 1776, in Kozuke & Musashi in 1781, and in Hokkaido in 1790, were only partially successful but also led to severe reprisals.

==== Malt tax riots in Scotland, 1725 ====
A duty on malt had been imposed in England to pay for a war against France. At the union with Scotland in 1707, most taxes were made uniform, but under the Treaty of Union, Scotland was given a temporary exemption from the malt tax until the end of the war. After the war, in 1725, the House of Commons applied a new malt tax which applied throughout Great Britain, but charged at only half the rate in Scotland. Scots were unused to this tax, which increased the price of beer. Enraged citizens in Glasgow drove out the military and destroyed the home of their representative in parliament, who had voted for the tax. In Edinburgh, brewers went on strike, illegally. Andrew Millar, then a book trade apprentice, helped overthrow attempts by Edinburgh magistrates to control dissemination of opinion during the unrest. The pamphlet Millar refers to in the letter to Robert Wodrow dated 10 August 1725, and his actions detailed in the letter dated 15 July, emphasized contemporary doubts and challenges to the strike's "illegality". Much later, in 1806, there were malt tax riots in Llannon, Wales, in which a mob attacked 26 excise tax collectors who were searching for malt.

==== Excise tax riots in England, 1733 ====
Robert Walpole's attempts to introduce an excise tax bill led to widespread, heated protest, including mobs that invaded the House of Commons. Walpole was forced to withdraw his proposal.

==== "Jack-a-Lents", 1734–49 ====
In Gloucester and Hereford counties, England, rioters dressed in women's clothing and blackface destroyed tollbooths, a variety of resistance that would reemerge a century later in the Rebecca riots. A royal proclamation complained that the rebels "have made publick and open Declaration, that they would proceed to pull down ſeveral other Turnpikes; and that if any of the Commiſſioners ſhould attempt to ſet up the Turnpikes again, they would pull down their Houſes, and would cut down the Turnpikes as often as they ſhould be ſet up."

A similar outbreak took place in Bristol in 1749, in which self-styled Jack o' Lents, "many naked with their faces blacked ... destroyed the gates at Bedminster, Ashton, Don John's Cross, Dundry, Backwell, Nailsea, Redcliffe, Totterdown, Teasford and Bath Roads, Hanham, Kingswood, Stoke's Croft, &c., &c."

==== Porteous riots, 1736 ====
Rioters, sympathetic to condemned smugglers who were resisting excise taxes, managed to free one, but in an attempt to free another several were killed by the Edinburgh city guard, commanded by John Porteous. Porteous was convicted of these killings, but pardoned by Queen Caroline, whereupon a lynch mob seized Porteous and hanged him.

==== Tithe resistance in France, 1736 ====
Peasants in disguise attacked and reclaimed the grain from the granary of a tithe collector in France in 1736. Authorities could find no witnesses willing to testify against any of the attackers.

==== North Carolina Counties Resist, 1746 ====
In 1746, the North Carolina colonial governor tried to rejigger the composition of the colonial Assembly, taking seats away from some counties. Those counties responded by withdrawing from the Assembly and refusing to surrender any taxes to the colonial government. Other counties, not wanting to bear the whole cost of government themselves, then responded by withholding their own taxes. This state of affairs lasted eight years.

==== French and Indian War, 1755 ====
In the mid-18th century, American Quaker John Woolman led many Quakers to question and refuse the payment of taxes to pay for the French and Indian War. In 1755, Woolman addressed the Philadelphia Yearly Meeting with his concern, saying in part:

Some of our members, who are officers in civil government, are, in one case or other, called upon in their respective stations to assist in things relative to the wars; but being in doubt whether to act or crave to be excused from their office, if they see their brethren united in the payment of a tax to carry on the said wars, may think their case not much different, and so might quench the tender movings of the Holy Spirit in their minds. Thus, by small degrees, we might approach so near to fighting that the distinction would be little else than the name of a peaceable people.

A group of several like-minded Quakers, including John Woolman, John Churchman, and Anthony Benezet then sent a letter to other meetings, which read in part:

[B]eing painfully apprehensive that the large sum granted by the late Act of Assembly for the king's use is principally intended for purposes inconsistent with our peaceable testimony, we therefore think that as we cannot be concerned in wars and fightings, so neither ought we to contribute thereto by paying the tax directed by the said Act, though suffering be the consequence of our refusal, which we hope to be enabled to bear with patience.

==== The "Regulator" movement, 1767–71 ====
The Regulator movement against the corrupt colonial administration of North Carolina from around 1767 to 1771 presaged the American Revolution. It began with organized groups of rural North Carolinans refusing to pay inflated taxes to corrupt authorities, and eventually built to an armed rebellion (which was crushed).

==== A revolt in Palermo, 1773 ====
Most Sicilians refused to pay new taxes imposed in 1770, and ripped down notices announcing the new levies. By 1773 the resistance led to a full-fledged revolt and ushered in a period when Palermo was under the de facto rule of the maestranze (guilds).

==== American Revolution ====
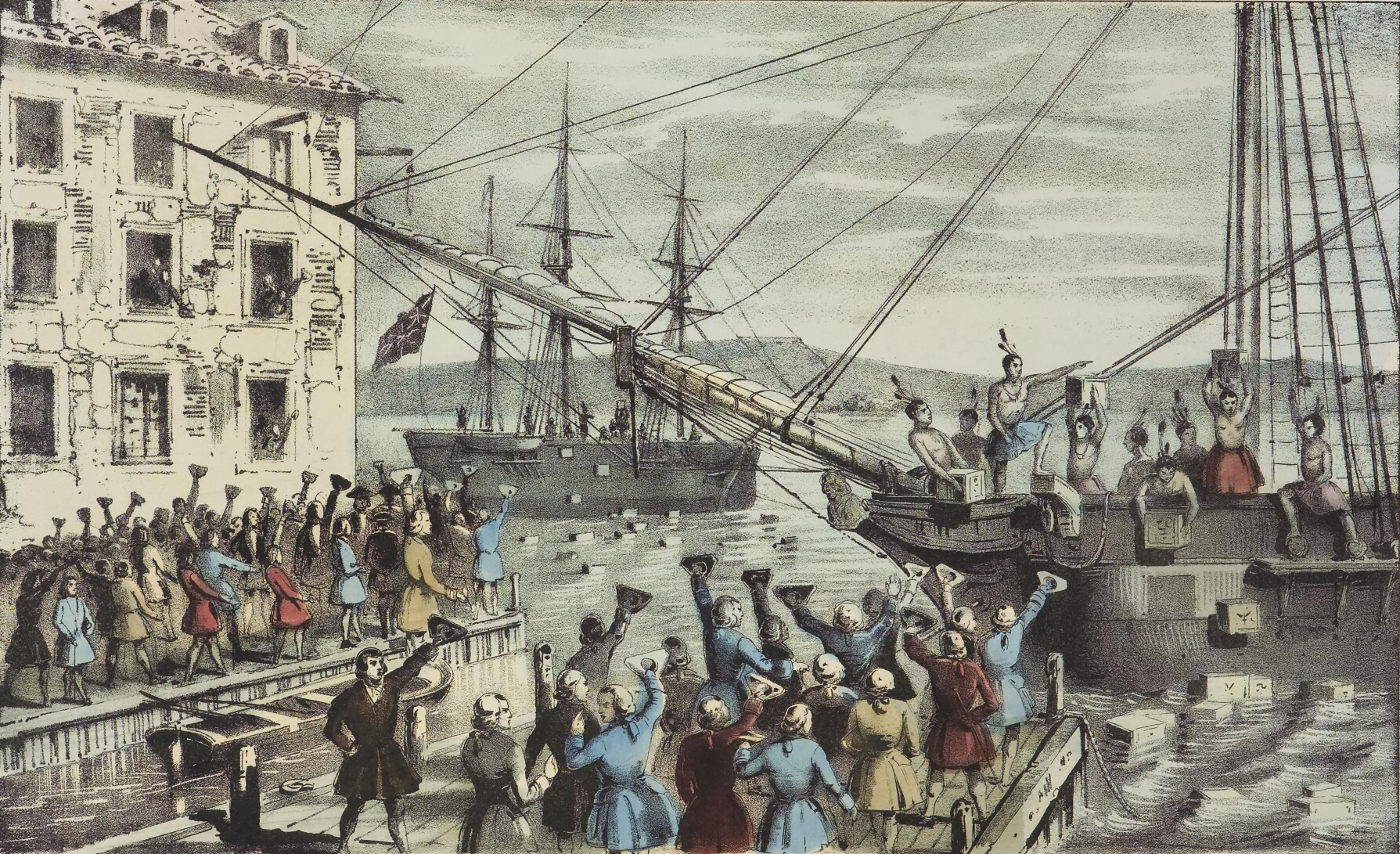
Boston Tea Party, 16 December 1773

American colonists in the Thirteen Colonies used various methods of tax resistance to resist the British Parliament in the years leading up to the American Revolution, including the Boston Tea Party action; the Gaspée Affair; "spinning bees" in which revolutionary-minded women would make untaxed domestic cloth (prefiguring Gandhi's homespun cloth campaign); and a boycott of other taxed goods.

After the revolution was underway, taxes instituted by the American patriot side were also widely resisted. One 1781 tax in Connecticut, for example, was designed to raise £288,233 but raised only £40,000 due to colonists' unwillingness to pay. Some Quaker meetings recommended that their members not pay taxes to the revolutionary governments, and other Quakers refused to use Continental currency, which the revolutionary governments were using for seigniorage.

==== African American protests against taxation without representation, 1780 ====
In 1780, African American Paul Cuffe and his brother resisted the state tax of Massachusetts. Cuffe wrote to the state legislature: "While we are not allowed the privilege of free men of the state having no vote or influence in the election with those that tax us. Yet many of our color, as is well known, have cheerfully entered the field of battle in the defense of the common cause." In 1783, free taxpaying African Americans in Massachusetts were given full citizenship rights, including the right to vote.

==== Revolt of the Comuneros, 1781 ====
The Revolt of the Comuneros in Colombia began with bands of armed protesters confronting tax commissioners and state monopoly shops.

==== New Hampshire secessionists, 1781 ====
For a while, during the early days of the United States, Vermont was an independent republic of sorts, though with aspirations for statehood. Some regions of neighboring New Hampshire felt more loyal to the Vermont Republic than to the confederation of United States, and expressed this by refusing to pay taxes to the latter.

==== York tax riot, 1786 ====
In York, Pennsylvania, in 1786, Jacob Bixler's cow was distrained after he refused to pay a tax. Sympathizers with Bixler disrupted the subsequent auction and rescued the cow.

==== Shays' Rebellion 1786–87 ====
During 1786 and 1787, former Continental Army captain and farmer Daniel Shays led an armed rebellion of farmers in Western Massachusetts against the state government's repressive economic policy of tax and debt collections.

==== Tax resistance during the French Revolution ====
During the French Revolution and its aftermath, customs houses were burned by mobs; tax rolls were destroyed; excise collectors were made to renounce their jobs, then were run out of town (or in some cases killed). Popular tax resistance was directed both against the toppling monarchy and against the governments that would try to replace it.

War taxes were levied before and after French revolutionary troops occupied the German Rhineland and the Southern Netherlands during the War of the First Coalition. Churches and monasteries were taxed heavily before they were dissolved. Huge amounts of gold and silver objects, many from the Middle Ages and irreplaceable, were melted down in this period to pay for these taxes. Protests occurred but did not help. The famous Trier Cathedral treasure suffered immensely; only twelve objects of precious metal survived. The equally rich Treasury of the Basilica of Saint Servatius in Maastricht lost 80% of its treasures, even though many precious objects were hidden in private homes. Aachen Cathedral Treasury remained largely untouched because the most valuable pieces were sent away to Paderborn in time.

==== The Whiskey Rebellion, 1791–94 ====
There was also an earlier rebellion, in 1783, against a Pennsylvania state excise tax on whiskey. In Washington County, protesters seized a fleeing tax collector, forced him to destroy his arms and paperwork, shaved his head, and paraded him through the areas he was sent to tax.

==== White Lotus Rebellion, 1793 ====
Members of the White Lotus Society refused to pay taxes, and their movement eventually grew into a full rebellion that lasted until 1803.

==== Pazvantoğlu rebellion, 1794 ====
In the wake of the Pazvantoğlu rebellion, peasants who had been expecting their taxes to be eliminated in the wake of the rebel victory fled their villages rather than pay the enduring taxes.

==== Resistance in Mexico, 1780–1807 ====
There was widespread resistance to the pulque tax and other taxes in Zempoala and Otumba, beginning in 1780.

=== 19th century ===
==== A mass tax strike in Benares, 1810–11 ====
When the East India Company attempted to impose a house tax in Bengal, 200,000 residents of Benares shut their shops, left their homes, assembled en masse in the countryside, and petitioned the Company administration to lift the tax. The protest occurred from December 1810 until January 1811. The Company administration at first made a show of force, but eventually rescinded the tax.

==== Radical Reformers, 1819 ====
The "Radical Reformers" were advocates of democratic reforms in England—things like universal male suffrage and secret ballots. In the wake of a military massacre of reform demonstrators in Manchester in August, 1819, reformers vowed to refuse to buy and consume products on which the government applied an excise tax, like tea, tobacco, and alcoholic beverages.

==== Bermuda, 1821 ====
When residents of St. George parish refused to pay their church tithes, William Lumley, governor of Bermuda, put several in military jail. Lumley's acts were later ruled illegal (Basham v. Lumley, 1829), the court ruling that although the governor of the Bermuda colony had also been granted ecclesiastical authority by the crown, he was not authorized to use his civil authority to imprison people who refused his ecclesiastical orders; at most he could excommunicate them.

==== Tumenggung Mohammad revolt, 1825 ====
The followers of Tumenggung Mohammad in Indonesia practiced tax resistance, including rioting against tax collectors.

==== Tax resistance against Charles X of France, 1829 ====
When Charles X of France attempted to bypass the legislature and enact its own taxes in 1829, French liberals in the Breton Association organized tax resistance and created a fund to defray the costs of any tax resisters who were prosecuted. Six Parisian newspapers who printed the Association's manifesto were prosecuted by the crown. Fifteen regional organizations, including Refus de l'impôt, Aide-toi, le ciel t'aidera, and Association parisienne, were formed specifically to engage in tax resistance.

==== Tax resistance in Georgian England ====
In the 1820s and 1830s, activists like William Benbow and Thomas Jonathan Wooler and groups such as the National Union of the Working Classes and National Political Union advocated and practiced tax resistance.

==== The Tithe War, 1830–38 ====
From 1830 to 1838, Irish Catholics conducted a mass tax strike against the mandatory tithes payable to the Anglican official state Church of Ireland. The Tithe War, as it came to be called, had both a nonviolent, passive-resistance wing, led by James Warren Doyle, and a violent one, in which bands of paramilitary secret societies enforced the strike and attacked tax collectors and collaborators. The campaign was eventually successful in eliminating the tithe system, although the government essentially converted what had been tithes on the tenants into rent due through the landlords.

==== Resistance in Syria, 1831–54 ====
Syrians resisted being taxed both by Egypt and later by Turkey, and refused to pay these occupation governments.

==== Tax resistance for the Reform Act 1832 ====
Tax resistance was an important tool in the arsenal of the Birmingham Political Union and its allies who forced the Crown and the House of Lords to capitulate over the Reform Act 1832. In the spring of 1832, residents of Carmarthen, Wales, met and vowed to stop paying taxes if the Reform Act were not passed, and some stopped paying taxes in the wake of the collapse of Lord Grey's government.

==== Tinos, 1833 ====
In 1833, thousands of residents of the island of Tinos stopped paying their taxes in an organized campaign. The government reacted fiercely, imprisoning many leaders of the movement and forcing the local bishop to flee.

==== UK resistance to "Assessed Taxes," 1833–51 ====
There was sporadic resistance to assessed taxes (particularly the window tax) in the United Kingdom. Resisters felt the tax was overly-regressive. Resisters formed tax resistance associations and disrupted auctions of goods seized from resisters by the tax authorities.

==== Edinburgh Annuity/Clerico-Police Tax, 1833–61 ====
An annuity tax to raise money for the establishment clergy in Edinburgh, Scotland began to be resisted by nonconformists around 1833, in particular by William Tait, publisher of Tait's Magazine who went to jail for his stand. Celebrated imprisonments like this, and occasional attempts (often unsuccessful) by the authorities to seize and auction property of the resisters, characterized the campaign. The government attempted to appease the resisters by "abolishing" the annuity tax, but they did so by paying the clergy from funds raised by a different tax, leading the resisters to dub it the "Clerico-Police Tax" and to continue to resist it.

==== Tax resistance in Bulgaria, 1835–37 ====
Peasants in the western border region of Bulgaria refused to pay taxes in hopes of autonomy and assistance from the newly autonomous Serbia.

==== Robert Purvis, 1838, 1853 ====
African-American activist Robert Purvis refused to pay his Pennsylvania state taxes in protest against the state's denial of equal voting rights to black citizens around 1838, and then refused to pay the part of his property tax that went towards education in 1853 when his children were refused admission to the whites-only classrooms.

==== Rebecca Riots, 1839–43 ====
The Rebecca Riots were a protest against the high tolls which had to be paid on the local turnpike roads in Wales, and included destruction of tollhouses and harassment of toll collectors.

==== Corn Law protests, 1842 ====
In February, 1842 "a meeting of ladies" in Manchester opposed to the Corn Laws signed a tax resistance pledge, in which they

"resolve[d] that we will form ourselves into a provisional committee, to carry out a plan of passive resistance... That by passive resistance we understand that we will allow our furniture to be seized for the payment of assessed taxes without offering any resistance to the collecting officers, at the same time urging the people not to purchase the articles so seized. And further, we mean abstinence from the several taxed luxuries used in our homes. We adopt the above pledge for three months, and further pledge ourselves during that time to use our utmost exertions to preserve perfect peace among the people."

==== Poor Law protests, 1843 ====
Opposition to the New Poor Law led to refusal to pay the taxes for its support. The campaign featured demonstrations of thousands of people, passive resistance, and noncooperation with government auction of distrained goods. In County Waterford the campaign was particularly strong, and openly threatened violence against tax collectors, leading the poor rate collector there to abandon plans to distrain and auction property in lieu of voluntarily paid taxes.

==== Maryland bond protests, 1843 ====
Some residents of Maryland, as their state government went into default over canal bonds in the wake of the Panic of 1837, refused to pay taxes the proceeds of which were destined for bond-holders. In some areas, tax collectors resigned and the government was unable to find others willing to take their places. Tax resistance was promoted in part by the Locofocos, a Democratic party splinter group.

==== "White Quakers," 1843 ====
The White Quakers, an Irish Quaker splinter group named for their characteristic undyed clothing, undertook tax resistance in 1843 to protest government harassment of their sect.

==== Wine tax in Portugal, 1845 ====
When tax farmers attempted to collect a new tax on wine in the Felgueiras district in the wine country on the Douro, the citizens gathered in Penacova (also known as São Martinho de Penacova), armed themselves, and forced the tax collectors and the soldiers protecting them to flee. The next day, military reinforcements attacked the rebels, killing ten.

==== Zhaowen land tax, 1845 ====
When Zhaowen magistrate Yu Cheng delayed implementing a newly-enacted tax reduction to continue collecting taxes at the earlier, higher rate, 40 landowners stormed his office, destroying the furnishings there and then moving on to wreck the house of the tribute clerk. This led to an uprising that spread to Taicang and lasted into late 1846.

==== Mexican-American War, 1846 ====
Perhaps the most famous American example of a tax resister, Henry David Thoreau, was briefly jailed in 1846 for refusing to pay taxes in protest against the Fugitive Slave Act and the Mexican–American War. In his essay on civil disobedience, he wrote:

I meet this American government, or its representative, the State government, directly, and face to face, once a year, no more, in the person of its tax-gatherer; this is the only mode in which a man situated as I am necessarily meets it; and it then says distinctly, Recognize me; and the simplest, the most effectual, and, in the present posture of affairs, the indispensablest mode of treating with it on this head, of expressing your little satisfaction with and love for it, is to deny it then....

...If a thousand men were not to pay their tax bills this year, that would not be a violent and bloody measure, as it would be to pay them, and enable the State to commit violence and shed innocent blood. This is, in fact, the definition of a peaceable revolution, if any such is possible.

Thoreau was following in the footsteps of his fellow New England transcendentalists Amos Bronson Alcott and Charles Lane who had also been arrested for conscientious refusal to pay the poll tax.

==== Sicilian revolution of independence of 1848 ====
During the Sicilian revolution of independence of 1848 rebels destroyed tax records and assessments and many people stopped paying taxes.

==== Karl Marx prosecuted for promoting tax resistance, 1848 ====
During the Revolutions of 1848 in the German states, the royal and military aristocracy prohibited the first popularly elected parliament from assembling, and that parliament responded by declaring the government out-of-business:

So long as the National Assembly is not at liberty to continue its sessions in Berlin, the Brandenburg cabinet has no right to dispose of government revenues and to collect taxes.

Karl Marx, via his newspaper, the Neue Rheinische Zeitung, published this decree, adding: "From today, therefore, taxes are abolished! It is high treason to pay taxes. Refusal to pay taxes is the primary duty of the citizen!" Marx was later prosecuted for promoting tax resistance, but was acquitted after arguing that it was not illegal to promote tax resistance against an illegal government.

==== Jamaica, 1848 ====
Residents of St. Mary's parish in Jamaica launched a successful revolt against imperious tax collectors in 1848.

==== The Great Confederated Anti-Dray and Land Tax League of South Australia, 1850 ====
The Great Confederated Anti-Dray and Land Tax League of South Australia formed in the Spring of 1850 to resist taxes associated with a recently enacted Road Act. The League felt the taxes were excessive; oppressive to poor farmers while exempting rich merchants, mine owners, and bankers; had been imposed by a non-representative government body; and operated largely for the benefit of land-holders who were also members of the board that was imposing the tax and designing the road system.

==== Resistance to the Foreign Miners Tax of 1850 in California ====
The "Foreign Miners Tax" of 1850 required all California miners who were not American citizens to pay $20 per month. The tax was not so much a revenue raising instrument as a way of allowing citizens to monopolize mining and take over sites being worked by Chinese and Mexican miners. The tax resistance by foreign miners was successful. The tax was repealed by the end of 1850, though a smaller ($4/month) tax was reapplied to Chinese miners in 1852, and some particularly unscrupulous tax collectors continued to extort the tax from foreign miners even when it was no longer legal to do so. One person who was forced off of his mining claim by the Foreign Miners Tax was Joaquin Murieta, whose story became a Robin Hood-like myth in California.

==== Prussian democrats, 1850,1864 ====
In 1850 Lothar Bucher, leader of the radical democratic party in the Prussian national assembly, and others of similar views, were convicted for encouraging citizens to stop paying taxes to the autocratic government.

Similarly, in 1864 the delegate Johann Jacoby served six months behind bars for a speech calling for tax refusal, delivered in the presence of the King, an early manifestation of opposition to the rule of Otto von Bismarck.

==== Grape-growers's strike in Bulgaria, 1851 ====
In response to a tax increase on grapes and vineyards, Bulgaria's grape pickers went on strike.

==== Mass resistance in Jiangnan, 1853 ====
In Qingpu, China, numerous uprisings and organized tax resistance took place around 1853, some led by Zhou Lichun. Zhou had been a precinct land tax collector, but rebelled when the local magistrate began trying to extort taxes that were unjustified by law. He organized landowners in twenty precincts to boycott taxes, and successfully resisted government reprisals. In other actions that year, thousands of Nanjui County taxpayers attacked government offices and made attempts on the life of the magistrate, three granary clerks were boiled alive by enraged taxpayers, and Huating County residents burned the boats of mercenaries who were helping a magistrate collect taxes.

==== Ghana, 1854 ====
Residents of the Gold Coast resisted the introduction of a poll tax by rebelling against the colonial government in 1854. The rebellion was eventually suppressed by the colonial government, which continued to levy the poll tax.

==== License Tax resistance in Australia, 1854 ====
Miners in Australia met at a "monster meeting" in Castlemaine to launch an organized refusal to pay a mining license tax.

==== Resistance to the bedel, 1855–60 ====
A majority of Syrian Christians refused to pay a military commutation tax, the bedel, which was mandatory for non-Muslims who were draft-exempt.

==== Chinese immigrants in Australia, 1859 ====
Anti-Chinese sentiment in Australia led the government to try to reduce Chinese immigration through a tax on immigrants. The Chinese immigrants responded with a powerful, large-scale, well-organized tax resistance campaign that used a variety of tactics including consumer and labor strikes, petitions, mass-demonstrations, threats against collaborators with the tax system and potential strikebreakers, and prison-stuffing. They eventually convinced the government to rescind the hated tax.

==== Shantung resistance, 1860 ====
In Shantung, tax resisters killed tax collectors and set up parallel government structures.

==== Bhat resistance in India, 1861 ====
In 1861, travelling bards of the Bhat caste, complaining that they had been traditionally exempt from taxation, reacted to being subjected to an income tax in an extreme demonstration that accompanied their refusal to pay:

[T]hey cut themselves with knives, cursed the Assessors, bespattering them with their blood, and declared they would rather die than surrender their birthright. When several were apprehended, their wives began to hack their persons, and so severely that several have since died.

==== Ferenc Deák and Hungarian tax resistance, 1859–67 ====
Following military defeat by the Hungarian revolution of 1848 and the subsequent war of independence led by Lajos Kossuth, Hungarians adopted a strategy of passive resistance, including boycotting of Austrian goods and refusing Austrian taxes, while the dissolved Diet (parliament) and various agricultural, trade and educational associations continued to meet informally. The symbol of this strategy was Ferenc Deák, following his refusal to take public office under the Austrians and apparent semi-retirement in the 1850s. After Emperor Franz-Joseph issued his October Diploma in 1860, granting increased autonomy to various parts of the Austrian empire, the Hungarian county councils and Diet were reconvoked. However, the conflict with Austria continued—including renewed tax resistance—with Deák playing a more active role until the Diet's demands were conceded in 1867.

==== Mejba Revolt, 1864–65 ====
The Mejba Revolt was a rebellion in Tunisia against the doubling of an unpopular poll tax (the mejba) imposed on his subjects by Sadok Bey. The most extensive revolt against the rule of the Husainid Beys of Tunis, it saw uprisings all over the country and came close to prompting military intervention by Britain and France.

==== Don Cossack resistance, 1864–1882 ====
The Don Cossacks refused to pay the taxes levied by their provincial zemstvo after their exemption of taxes was revoked by the Russian reforms of the 1860s.

==== Resistance to the Czar's taxes in Abkhazia, 1866 ====
In Sukhumi, Abkhazia, "a number of persons, irritated by the imposition of direct taxes, resisted the collecting officers, killed several of them, and then set fire to the town."

==== Georgia dockworkers, 1867 ====
Georgia dockworkers responded to a tax specifically targeted to them by refusing to pay, even when locked out by the government.

==== New Zealand poll tax, 1868 ====
In 1868 residents of New Zealand were subjected to a poll tax. Some decided to resist and to form mutual insurance pacts for their defense.

==== Louisiana, 1872–79 ====
After a disputed election for governor in reconstruction Louisiana, the losing candidate, John McEnery, formed a shadow government and declared himself the truly elected governor. As part of this, he issued declarations saying that those people collecting taxes for the actually seated government were acting illegally and illegitimately and that citizens of Louisiana should resist these taxes.

McEnery's shadow government, representing a white-supremacist Democratic party opposed to the Republican black and carpetbagger government, maintained its parallel governance until mid-1873, and then folded under pressure from the United States federal government.

==== Rubí, Catalonia, 1873 ====
Citizens of Rubí, Catalonia refused to pay a war tax in 1873, shortly before the military commander of Catalonia was forced to flee in the face of a mutiny.

==== Launceston, Tasmania, 1874 ====
The Western Railway was a financial failure, and soon after it went into operation the government had to take it over from its bankrupt owners. Landholders in the railway district felt that the government take-over had changed the relationship between taxpayers and the railway, and that they were "morally exonerated from the principle of local taxation which they had endorsed when the district was polled in 1865. Since that period an entirely new principle had been adopted in the case of the Main Line Railway, and when they hesitated to pay their special rate, they acted on the conviction that it was the Government, and not they, who had broken faith." The landholders launched a tax resistance campaign, forcing the government to capitulate and rescind the tax.

==== White miners in Griqualand West, 1874 ====
In 1874, a group of small-scale European diamond miners at the "New Rush" in Kimberly, South Africa (then in a British colony called Griqualand West), launched a tax strike to protest the British colonial government's lack of response to their grievances.

==== Mexican-American Tax Resistance in Texas, 1877 ====
During the San Elizario Salt War, residents of El Paso County, Texas with loyalties to Mexico stopped paying taxes to the United States-loyal government.

==== South Carolina, 1877 ====
Similarly to what happened in Louisiana, white supremacists in South Carolina who disapproved of the reconstruction government practiced tax resistance and discouraged people from loaning money to the government by vowing to repudiate any such debts should they regain power.

==== Calls to resist in Denmark, 1877 and 1885 ====
In 1877 and again in 1885, the Left party in Denmark urged people to refuse to pay taxes levied by the Rightist government.

==== Tram tax resistance in Rio, 1880 ====
When the government of Rio increased the tramway tax and have this increase apply to every passenger, Jose Lopes da Silva Trovao and other protest organizers called on people to refuse to pay the tax.

==== Inconfidência Mineira, Brazil, 1789 ====
Tax resistance called Inconfidência Mineira was against one-fifth tax over gold.

==== Tax resistance launches the First Boer War, 1880 ====
The First Boer War broke out when the British colonial government seized a wagon from Piet Bezuidenhoudt who had refused to pay a tax. When the colonial government attempted to auction off the wagon to raise the tax money, supporters of Bezuidenhoudt seized it, and met government representatives who came to arrest them.

==== Paisley abbey manse tax resistance, 1880 ====
Paisley instituted a tax to raise funds to repair the manse (minister's house) of Paisley Abbey. People who were not members of that church (the official Church of Scotland) did not feel they should have to pay for this, and in December 1880 they organized a tax resistance campaign. Some 200 people refused to pay the tax. The authorities took legal action against a few, but then quickly dropped the charges.

==== Irish settlers in Canada, 1879–81 ====
Two hundred Irish settlers in Gatineau refused to pay a county tax. According to one account:

When a deputy sheriff went to make seizures, the residents threatened to string him to the nearest tree. Finally, they compelled him to eat the writs he had, and then gave him a limited time to get out of the township.

==== English hop growers, 1882 ====
The Anglican church legally exacted "extraordinary tithes" from hop growers, who began resisting the tax and risking distraint in the hopes of prompting a change of the law.

==== The Tswana in Bechuanaland, 1882 ====
Montshiwa, a chief of the Rolong tribe, led a tax rebellion against the Boers in Bechuanaland in 1882. After some early successes, the rebellion was suppressed, and large hunks of territory were divided up as spoils by the victorious Boers.

==== Resistance to Repaying Fraudulent Railroad Bonds, 1870–1913 ====
Crooked politicians and swindlers in Missouri concocted a scheme in which the government issued bonds to pay for a railroad that never got built. Residents of the swindled areas subsequently refused to levy taxes on themselves to raise funds to pay off the bonds. The bond holders filed suit and obtained court orders that county judges institute such taxes, but the judges then went to jail for contempt rather than comply.

In 1878, residents of Steuben County, New York, also refused to pay taxes to pay off crooked railroad bonds, and disrupted auctions at which the goods of resisters were being sold to pay resisted taxes.

There was a similarly motivated tax revolt in Kentucky in 1906 in which a group of resisters raided the tax collector and reclaimed seized property.

==== Cincinnati Liquor Tax revolt, 1884 ====
3,200 (out of 3,500) saloon owners refused to pay a liquor tax in Cincinnati in 1884. The tax was eventually held to be unconstitutional.

==== Egypt, 1884 ====
Passive resistance to taxation was widespread in Upper Egypt as the population lost faith in the government there in the face of the Mahdist insurrection.

==== Crete, 1880 ====
Christians in Ottoman Crete organized to refuse to pay taxes in 1887. The government quickly reduced taxes and made other concessions to (temporarily) quiet the revolt.

==== Samoa, 1887 ====
Residents of Samoa refused to pay taxes to the German colonial government in 1887.

==== The Welsh tithe war, 1887–88 ====
A rebellion against mandatory tithes for the establishment church, similar to that which had raged in Ireland earlier, broke out in Wales in 1887, and featured the disruption of tax auctions by huge crowds of resisters.

==== "Constable Leahy Tax" resistance, 1888 ====
On 9 September 1887, police fired on rent strikers in Mitchelstown (Ireland), killing three, in what became known as the Mitchelstown Massacre. The authorities sided with the police, and awarded a £1,000 judgement to a constable who was wounded in the course of the massacre, ordering that the money would be raised by an additional tax on the Irish—one that would come to be called the "Constable Leahy Tax." The tax was widely refused, and parliamentarian Thomas Condon was prosecuted on criminal conspiracy charges for publicly advocating tax resistance.

==== Dothan riot, 1889 ====
Dothan, Alabama tried to tax all vehicles traveling through the town in 1889, in reaction to the decision by the Farmers' Alliance to avoid municipal taxation by building a warehouse outside of the town limits. Farmers attempted to evade the tax, but were violently opposed by law enforcement, which killed two resisters.

==== "Half-Breeds" in Dakota, 1889 ====
"Half-Breeds" in the Dakota territory of the United States seized already-collected taxes from a sheriff and announced that they would fight to the last man (there were roughly 4,000) against further attempts to tax them.

==== Chatham Islands, 1891 ====
Residents of the Chatham Islands refused to pay a dog tax in 1891 and prepared instead to submit to arrest and trial.

==== "Vicars' Rate" rebellions in Halifax and Coventry, 1875–92 ====
Opponents of a mandatory tithe for the establishment church in Halifax and later in Coventry, England, formed "Anti-Vicars' Rate Associations" and launched campaigns of tax refusal in 1875 and 1892 respectively.

==== Guerrero, Mexico, in 1892 ====
When people in Guerrero refused to pay federal taxes in 1892, the government sent in troops, who were routed by the tax resisters who captured a General as a hostage.

==== Montreal merchants, 1893 ====
Merchants in Montreal, claiming that a new tax on merchants was unjustly much higher for them than for merchants in other areas, decided to refuse to pay the tax in 1893.

==== Fasci Siciliani, 1893 ====
The Fasci Siciliani movement reached its peak in 1893 in a series of large anti-tax demonstrations that included the destruction of tax offices and the burning of tax records.

==== Low Rebellion, 1895 ====
Irish settlers in Canada stage a small scale revolt against government taxes in Low, Quebec. The militia was called out and ended the disturbances.

==== Irish Unionists ====
Irish unionists used (or threatened) tax resistance to fight against home rule.

==== Cuban War Tax, 1897 ====
Cuban cigar workers in Florida refused to pay a Cuban war tax that was being withheld from their paychecks in 1897.

==== Industrialist threatens to "shrug", 1897 ====
Industrialist James F. Hathaway of Somerville, Massachusetts refused to pay a municipal tax on his corporation stock and would periodically threaten to pack up and leave town if the city insisted on pressing for payment, in a game of bluff that sometimes led to the city waiving the tax, but other times led to Hathaway's jailing.

==== The Hut Tax War, 1898 ====
In 1896, the British government decreed that the inland "protectorate" adjacent to its colony of Sierra Leone should be taxed. The tax would be imposed on dwellings, at an annual rate that in some cases exceeded the value of the dwelling itself, and came to be known as the "Hut Tax."

Sierra Leonians were unused to regular taxation of any sort, and interpreted the tax as meaning that the British government was assuming ownership of all of the dwellings in the area and charging rent. Resistance to the Hut Tax culminated in the Hut Tax War of 1898, which was ultimately suppressed.

==== Tax resistance in the Philippines, 1898 ====
In 1898, Emilio Aguinaldo's fledgling government faced tax refusal from many provinces that had expected a reduction or removal of the taxes.

==== Māori tax resistance, 1894–1933 ====
Māoris periodically refused to pay an unpopular dog tax to the colonial government.

==== Crow reservation, 1897–9 ====
Members of the Crow Nation refused to pay taxes to the state of Montana in the late 1890s, and the state seized all of the sheep on the reservation in retaliation.

==== Tancament de Caixes, 1899–1900 ====
Traders and industrialists in Barcelona, led by mayor Bartomeu Robert i Yarzábal, began a tax strike on 20 October 1899 that came to be known as the "Tancament de Caixes" (shutting the cashboxes). This was a protest to taxes the Spanish government was introducing to pay for the costs of its defeats in the Spanish–American War, and also against tax rates that discriminated against Barcelona in favor of Madrid.

==== German East Africa, 1900 ====
German colonial governor Eduard von Liebert was accused of having had 2,000 residents of German East Africa executed for their refusal to pay a hut tax.

=== 20th century ===
==== Poll tax resistance in Alabama, 1901 ====
200 employees of the Dimmick Pipe Company in Birmingham, Alabama, walked off the job in 1901 when they learned a poll tax would be deducted from their pay.

==== Foreigners in Japan resist a property tax, 1902 ====
Starting in Yokohama, and spreading to Kobe and elsewhere, hundreds of British and other foreign residents of Japan resisted a new "House Tax" in the hopes of forcing the legality of the tax into arbitration—passively submitting to distraint rather than paying a tax they felt to be illegal. They were backed (in the demand for arbitration, if not in the tax resistance) by the British, French, and German governments. This became one of the first cases decided by an international tribunal, with one Japanese judge, one French judge, and a Norwegian judge who turned out to be the tie-breaker, ruling in favor of the Europeans and against Japan.

==== Cutting off Police Pay-offs in New York City, 1902 ====
The New York City District Attorney, its Police Commissioner, agents from the Society for the Prevention of Crime, and the president of the New York County Liquor Dealers' Association in 1902 announced a joint campaign to defend liquor dealers who stopped paying police protection money. This mostly represents a government policy change in how it was going to be taxing saloonkeepers, but because the change involved rescinding an extralegal tax extorted under-the-table by city employees, it was hard for the government to accomplish in ordinary ways. So it had to nurture a tax resistance movement and encourage solidarity among its members by offering some protection of its own (including judges who reduced fines against people arrested by the police in extortion attempts to near-nothing).

==== British nonconformists, 1903–24 ====
In 1903, tens of thousands of British nonconformists began resisting the part of their taxes that paid for sectarian schools. Over 170 would eventually be jailed for their tax refusal.

==== Americans in the Isle of Pines, 1903 ====
The United States took Cuba from Spain in the Spanish–American War, including the Isle of Pines. When Cuba became independent soon after, Americans on the Isle of Pines hoped that they would continue to live under American rule, and they decided to resist paying taxes to Cuba in the hopes of bringing the issue to a head.

==== Korea, 1903 ====
In several Korean provinces in 1903, taxpayers rose up, reclaimed their taxes from the government treasury, and imprisoned their governors.

==== Hut Tax resistance in Swaziland, 1903–07 ====
Attempts to levy a hut tax in Swaziland sparked resistance led by Dinuzulu kaCetshwayo, culminating eventually in the Bambatha Rebellion.

==== Income tax resistance in Tasmania, 1904 ====
At open-air "monster" meetings in Tasmania in early 1904, people vowed to resist an income tax that had been instituted by the recently ousted government but unexpectedly not rescinded by the new one.

==== Sugar manufacturers in the Dominican Republic, 1905 ====
American-owned businesses running the sugar industry in the Dominican Republic refused to pay a new tax instituted by that country's government in 1905, shortly before the United States formally appropriated the country's economy.

==== Opposition to Creek taxes in Oklahoma Territory, 1899–1905 ====
White Americans living in Muscogee (Creek) territory before Oklahoma became a state in 1907 resisted paying taxes to the Creek Nation government, hoping the United States federal government would back them up if push came to shove.

==== The Russian Revolution, 1905–06 ====
During the Russian Revolution of 1905 a coalition of anti-government groups in Petrograd issued a manifesto calling for mass tax resistance and other economic non-cooperation against Russia's czarist government. It read, in part, "There is only one way out: to overthrow the government, to deprive it of its last strength. It is necessary to cut the government off from the last source of its existence: financial revenue."

In 1906, when the Czar dissolved the First Duma, its members fled to Finland where they issued the Vyborg Manifesto which called upon the people of Russia to refuse to pay their taxes until representative government was restored.

==== Zulus in Natal, 1906 ====
A group of Zulus announced that they would refuse to pay the poll tax to the British colonial government in Natal. An inspector from the Natal Mounted Police killed one Zulu tax protester, and was in turn killed along with another of his party.

==== Doukhobors in Canada, 1906 ====
Doukhobor exiles in Canada refused to pay school taxes on their lands, saying that, as they always refused to have their children educated, lest they learn evil things, they would not pay money for school purposes. They removed their property from the district so as to evade seizure.

==== Turkey, 1906–07 ====
In the waning days of the Ottoman Empire, there was widespread and successful refusal to pay the sultan's poll tax.

==== Undertakers strike in Valladolid ====
When the municipal authorities of Valladolid imposed taxes on hearses, the undertakers of that town organised a passive resistance strike, refusing to send out either hearses or coffins. As a result, the dead had to be conveyed to the cemeteries on stretchers, carried by porters.

==== Winemakers tax strike in France, 1907 ====
A winegrowers' committee in Argelliers organized a tax strike in 1907 that included the mass resignations of municipal councils, and was met by military force by the central government.

==== Greek community in Lewiston, Maine, 1907 ====
Greek immigrants in Lewiston, Maine, organized a tax strike against a new poll tax.

==== Silver Lake Assembly, 1908 ====
Forty members of a Silver Lake Assembly property association launched a tax strike against what they believed to be an illegally assessed tax the town of Castile, New York was trying to subject them to, in 1908.

==== Japanese laborers in California, 1909 ====
Japanese-American residents of Oxnard, rebelled against being unfairly subject to both the city and county tax (one was supposed to clear the other). The county tried to pull a fast one, and swooped in on the workers while they were in the beet fields where they were temporarily working and which were outside the city limits. They declared the workers to be thereby subject to the county poll tax as well. Some of the Japanese workers left the area; others refused to pay the tax and were subjected to property seizures.

==== Nicaragua, 1909 ====
Shortly before the fall of president Zelaya's government to rebels backed by the United States, his government imprisoned resisters to a tax he was using to try to raise funds to prop up his regime.

==== Italian immigrants in Pennsylvania, 1909 ====
When Pennsylvania passed a law banning Italian immigrants from owning firearms, a number of Italians in Lanesboro began resisting their taxes in response.

==== The Women's Tax Resistance League, 1909–1918 ====
The British women's suffrage movement, in particular the Women's Tax Resistance League, used tax resistance in their struggle, and explicitly saw themselves in a tradition of tax resistance that included John Hampden. According to one source, "tax resistance proved to be the longest-lived form of militancy, and the most difficult to prosecute."

Tax resistance among the American women's suffrage movement was less organized, but also practiced. Julia and Abby Smith, Annie Shaw, Lucy Stone, Virginia Minor, and Elizabeth Cady Stanton were among those who practiced and advocated tax resistance as a protest against "taxation without representation."

Tax resistance also played a role in the women's suffrage movements of Bermuda, France, Germany, and South Africa.

==== Unrest in China, 1907–16 ====
The salt tax and other taxes, and conflict with organized smuggler associations, led to conflict in China, which included, in 1910, an assault on tax collectors and on the salt tax monopoly office, and the "Two Kitchen Knives Rebellion" led by He Long in 1916 in which the Salt Tax Bureau at Ba Maoqui was torched and the bureau's director was killed.

In 1910, also, merchants in Beijing began withholding their payments of stamp tax to pressure the monarchy to adopt republican reforms.

==== Poll tax resistance in Grafton, Illinois, 1910 ====
A Socialist Party activist in Grafton, Illinois, was jailed six months for his refusal to pay the city's poll tax in 1910. Party head Ralph Korngold used the case as a rallying cry for local radicals.

==== Málaga, 1911 ====
In Canillas De Aceituno, Spain, residents rioted at the sale of a tax resister's goods and took up arms against government forces.

==== Road tax resistance in Kansas, 1911 ====
A number of towns in Kansas organized tax resistance leagues in 1911 to combat a tax variously characterized as a road tax or a poll tax that they believed had been illegally railroaded through the legislature.

==== Rhodesia, 1911 ====
In 1911, the Legislative Council passed an ordinance imposing a one shilling per month tax on farmers for each native laborer they hired, payable to the Labour Bureau, which coordinated the exploitation of African labor for colonial farmers and miners. The farmers decided to resist the tax. Hundreds were convicted and fined, and some were jailed after refusing to pay the fines. The farmers were successful in convincing the government to rescind the tax.

==== Inishmurray, 1911 ====
Residents of the island of Inishmurray considered themselves a tiny, independent monarchy, and would combat efforts by mainland authorities to tax them by refusing to let the officials disembark.

==== Poll tax in Delaware, 1912 ====
Socialist and labor groups in Wilmington joined forces and began resisting a new Delaware poll tax in 1912.

==== Baby Carriage Tax disregarded in Brest, 1913 ====
A tax on handcarts in Brest, France, was interpreted to apply also to baby carriages, which led to universal refusal to pay what was seen as a ridiculous tax.

==== Indians in South Africa, 1913 ====
The South African government imposed a tax on Indian immigrants, and, in one of Mahatma Gandhi's early forays into satyagraha he helped to organize a strike, an illegal march, and a tax refusal campaign in protest.

==== The "Turra Coo", 1913 ====
In late 1913, the government seized a cow from a Scottish resister of the taxes associated with the National Insurance Act. The government had difficulty selling the cow, as locals were sympathetic with the tax resistance. Eventually they brought in an outside auctioneer, but the auction was disrupted by protesters and the cow escaped. Today there is a statue of a cow in Turriff, Scotland commemorating the event.

==== Master Plumbers in Joplin, Missouri, 1914 ====
Ten master plumbers in Joplin, Missouri, signed a resolution vowing to refuse to pay a new $50 annual tax on their profession in 1914.

==== Dog tax resistance, Yonkers, New York, 1917 ====
Robert H. Miller stopped paying his dog license fee in 1917, complaining that "I consider said tax a unjust burden for owners who have dogs for their home and families' defence, not for luxuries, as the cost of living to raise five children is expensive enough without feeding a dog if he was not necessary in the wild section of this town, as we have no benefit from all the taxation with which we are burdened, no open streets, no police, no sewers, and many more necessities that I could mention."

==== World War I in the United States, 1917–18 ====
In the United States, although the decision whether or not to purchase war bonds to support World War I was ostensibly voluntary, those who chose not to buy them were subject to strong pressure including mob violence. For example, John Schrag was beaten, arrested, and prosecuted and he and his property were smeared with yellow paint by a mob for having refused to buy war bonds. One witness said:

[T]hey tried to get him to buy liberty bonds during the war, and he wouldn't buy none.... They brought him in and he never said a word, and the questions or anything they'd ask him, he never, never complained or never put up no resistance whatsoever. ... I never saw so much yellin' and a cursing and slapped him. And buffeted him and beat him and kicked him. He never offered any resistance whatsoever. One of the fellows went and got a, a hardware store and got a gallon of yellow paint. And pulled the lid off and poured it over his face. He had a long beard, kind of a short heavyset man, had a nice beard, and that run down all over his eyes, his face, and his beard, and his clothes. Of course that was yellow.... He never offered no resistance whatsoever and they, one man went to the hardware store again and he got a rope and put it around, got there, and put around his neck and marched him down to the, close to the city jail, a little calaboose there. Had a tree there and they was going to hang him to this tree. ...I don't know how many people walked right up to him and spit in his face and he never said a word. And he just looked up all the time we was doing that. Possibly praying, I don't know. But there's some kind of a glow come over his face and he just looked like Christ. ... (inaudible). Enemies smite you on one cheek, turn the other and brother he did it. He just kept doing it. They'd slug him on the one side of the face and he'd turn his cheeks on the other. He exemplified the life of Christ more than any man I ever saw in my life.

Herman Bausch was imprisoned for 28 months by the state of Montana for seditious statements he allegedly made while being held captive by a violent mob who were enraged at him for his unwillingness to buy liberty bonds.

==== Darwin Rebellion ====
In Darwin (Northern Territory, Australia) in early 1919, citizens organized an income tax strike, and a boycott of the local (taxed) alcohol monopolist, John Gilruth, who was also the Administrator (governor). The resistance continued until Gilruth fled Darwin. Harold George Nelson, who was imprisoned for his tax resistance during this action, later became the Northern Territory's first parliamentary representative.

==== Soft drinks tax, United States, 1919 ====
When World War I ended, people stopped paying a tax on soft drinks that had been instituted as a war funding measure, although the tax had not yet been rescinded. The Bureau of Internal Revenue threatened tax evaders with fines and imprisonment.

==== Northern Territory and Papua, 1919–21 ====
Tax resistance was a tactic used both by anti-capitalist labor groups and groups agitating for democratic representation in the Northern Territory and Papua in the years around 1920. Miners in Western Australia also took up tax resistance in 1921.

==== Welsh miners, 1919 ====
Miners in Wales went on strike rather than pay the income tax which was newly being applied to incomes below £200.

==== Russian Civil War, 1917–1923 ====
Tax resistance was used by Russian peasants who were being taxed by multiple parties in the Civil War.

==== European pacifists (1920s) ====
After World War I, some European pacifists associated with the movement that would coalesce around War Resisters International, like Beatrice and Kees Boeke, adopted war tax resistance as one of their forms of resistance.

==== Weimar Germany (1919–33) tax resistance ====
Tax resistance campaigns sporadically broke out in Germany between the world wars, including a tax strike in Württemberg, Stuttgart, Cologne, Essen and other areas in 1920, an income tax strike by Prussian farmers in 1922, and the tax strikes of the Rural People's Movement (Landvolkbewegung) in Schleswig-Holstein from 1928.

==== Burma during the 1920s ====
Burmese Buddhist monks organized tax resistance and other forms of civil disobedience against the British colonial government during the 1920s.

==== Dutch West Indies, 1921 ====
Residents resisted an income tax from which Dutch settlers were exempt, then successfully disrupted an auction at which a resister's goods were being sold for back taxes.

==== Protesting a "bachelor tax" 1921 ====
The state of Montana applied a $3 tax on all bachelors in the state. One of them, William Atzinger, refused to pay on sex discrimination grounds. The following year the state supreme court ruled the "bachelor tax" and another poll tax applicable only to men to be unconstitutional.

==== Sinn Féin in 1921 ====
Sinn Féin organized tax resistance against home rule in Northern Ireland in 1921.

==== Arkansas road tax rebellion, 1921 ====
Craighead County residents forced the commissioners of a road improvement district to resign at gunpoint before they could spend tax money on a corrupt roads project.

==== Guntur tax refusal, 1921 ====
In an early manifestation of satyagraha, Indians from the Guntur district organized a noncooperation campaign and tax strike against British rule in 1921 that led to the government collecting less than 25% of the expected taxes.

==== The Poplar Rates Rebellion, 1921 ====
In 1921 the government of Poplar, a division of London, in protest against an unequal sharing of tax revenue between rich and poor boroughs, stopped collecting and passing on a variety of tax called "precepts" to the regional authorities. Thirty members of the Poplar Borough Council were imprisoned amid large protests.

==== Bondelswarts Rebellion, 1922 ====
The South African government, during their mandatory administration of South West Africa, imposed a tax on the Bondelswarts as a way of making them more dependent on taking low-wage jobs for white settlers. The Bondelswarts refused to pay, and Gysbert Hofmeyr, the Mandatory Administrator, organised in 400 armed men, and sent in aircraft to bomb the Bondelswarts. Casualties included 100 Bondelswart deaths, including women and children.

==== Income tax evasion in France, 1922 ====
Syndicalist groups in France promoted income tax evasion and defended evaders whose goods were in danger of government seizure.

==== The Ruhrkampf and Bavaria, 1923 ====
When France and Belgium invaded the Ruhr to enforce German reparations payments in 1923, the German government responded by encouraging and supporting a mass nonviolent resistance campaign against the occupation, which included tax resistance.

Right-wing politician Gustav Ritter von Kahr, shortly after he was declared dictator of Bavaria in 1923, ordered Bavarians to stop paying taxes to the federal Reich government.

==== French Stokers, 1923 ====
French stokers (ship workers) who were upset that the government was including in their income, for tax purposes, incidental benefits like the food they were served on board, refused payment and went on strike when their company went along with government attempts to garnishee their wages. The strike was ended when the company agreed to pay the stokers' income taxes itself.

==== Pennsylvania women win the vote, and the tax; refuse the latter, 1923–27 ====
When women won the right to vote in the United States, this sometimes also exposed them to taxes they had hitherto been exempt from. Some chose to resist these taxes. In Pennsylvania, a school tax became the target of a massive, statewide, grassroots resistance campaign. For example:

- In 1923, 89 women in Pottstown said that they were not interested in voting or in paying taxes, and refused to pay a school tax they had recently become vulnerable to.
- The same year, 800 women in Haverford refused to pay the tax, as did 250 in Media.
- Some 1,700 women in Charleroi refused to pay the tax and, in 1924, were ordered to be arrested.
- That year in Clifton Heights, exasperated tax collectors exonerated 700 women tax delinquents rather than try to pursue them for the taxes.
- In 1926, 200 women in Freeland were reported as tax delinquents.
- In 1927, 300 women in Darby followed suit, and ultimately 2,000 delinquent tax notices were sent there.

==== Red Spear Society, 1923–38 ====
A peasant secret mutual-defense group in China called the Red Spear Society supported tax resistance.

==== Indian workers in Fiji, 1924 ====
When Fiji added a £1 a year poll tax on Indian workers (representing about 12 days' pay), they regarded this as a bait-and-switch on their contracts, and vowed to go to jail rather than pay.

==== Indians in Kenya, 1924 ====
Indians in British India had started migrating to the British colony of Kenya during the second half of the 19th century, and by 1924 were beginning to exercise democratic political power. This led to concerns from the colonial government in Kenya, which issued a white paper which stated that the colonial government's priority was to focus on the unenfranchised African population rather than the Indian community. Indians in Kenya responded to this with an organized tax resistance campaign, which led to some of them being imprisoned by the colonial government. Whether from the effect of these imprisonments or from concessions made through back-channel negotiations, the protest ended in a few months.

==== Argentina, 1924 ====
A coalition of 1,500 leading industrialists of Argentina refused to pay into a state-run pension fund following a general strike and labor lockout organized to fight the law that established the fund.

==== London bookmakers strike, 1926 ====
To protest a new betting tax, the bookmakers at Tattersalls Park refused to bet, thus making it impossible for the track to lay odds, and effectively shutting down business there and off-track.

==== Cristero War, Mexico, 1926 ====
Tax resistance was used as a tactic in the Cristero War, where some people with Catholic sympathies refused to pay taxes to the government and turned to the church for defense.

==== Farmers in Queensland, Australia, 1927 ====
The government of Queensland, struggling with debt, enacted a stealth tax in the form of a registration fee charged to farmers who had wells and water pumps on their farms. The farmers, organized in "Local Producers's Associations," declared a tax strike, which forced the government to back down about a month later.

==== American Samoa, 1927 ====
In 1927, The Committee of the Samoan League organized tax resistance against the United States Navy's occupation of the American Samoa.

==== Shanghai, 1927 ====
Around the time of the Shanghai massacre of 1927, businesses were conducting a strike against municipal taxes there. Western importers, backed by their governments, also refused to unload their products that were subject to a new customs duty.

==== Samoa, 1928 ====
Residents of Samoa refused to pay taxes to the New Zealand occupation government in 1928.

==== Uri "bobbed hair tax" ====
The canton of Uri in Switzerland instituted a tax on women's bobbed hair in 1928, and by the following year the government was reporting widespread resistance (and ridicule) of the law.

==== Women's War, Nigeria, 1929 ====
The 1929 Women's War in Nigeria began as a dispute over taxes after men were taxed in 1928 and a resistance against a census that was rumoured to be preparation for taxation. Further tax revolts in 1938 and 1956 grew out of the same movement.

==== Indian independence campaign ====
Mahatma Gandhi's independence campaign in India used a variety of tax resistance strategies, including attacking the British taxed monopolies on salt and textiles by advocating the illegal production of salt outside of the monopoly system and the home-based spinning of cloth. In 1930 this tax resistance culminated in Gandhi's famous 240-mile (390 km) Salt March to Dandi to harvest sea salt in contravention of British colonial law. Other tax resistance campaigns persisted after this period, including resistance to the Damodar Canal tax in 1937–39.

==== The Great Depression, United States ====
In the United States, the term "tax revolt" is sometimes used to refer to a series of anti-tax state initiative campaigns. The first significant wave of these campaigns was during the 1930s. The Great Depression introduced unprecedented tax burdens to Americans. While real-estate values plummeted and unemployment skyrocketed, the cost of government remained high. As a result, taxes as a percentage of the national income nearly doubled from 11.6 percent in 1929 to 21.1 in 1932. Most of the increase took place at the local level and especially squeezed the resources of real estate taxpayers. Local tax delinquency rose steadily to a still standing record of 26.3% in 1933.

Many Americans reacted to these conditions by forming taxpayers' leagues to call for lower taxes and cuts in government spending. By some estimates, there were three thousand of them by 1933. Taxpayers' leagues endorsed such measures as laws to limit and rollback taxes, lowered penalties on tax delinquents, and cuts in government spending. Partly as a result of their efforts, sixteen states and numerous localities adopted property tax limitations while three states instituted homestead exemptions.

While taxpayers' leagues usually favored traditional legal and political strategies, a few were more direct. Probably the best known of these was the Association of Real Estate Taxpayers in Chicago. From 1930 to 1933, it led one of the largest tax strikes in American history. At its height, it had 30,000 paid members, a budget of $600,000, and a weekly radio show.

By 1933, the taxpayers' leagues had entered a period of decline. Several factors undermined the conditions that had nurtured revolt. For example, economic conditions gradually improved, the federal government extended aid to homeowners, and local governments reduced reliance on real estate taxes. To some extent, the tax revolt also fell victim to an effective counterattack by municipal reformers, government officials, and the holders of municipal debt such as bondholders and bankers who formed so-called "Pay Your Taxes" campaigns throughout the country. These campaigns used a combination of door-to-door solicitation, threats of coercion, and inducements, such as installment payment plans, to collect back taxes.

An alternative theory describing the decline of the taxpayers' leagues is that laws limiting existing taxes and new tax revenues from the manufacture and sale of alcohol due to the repeal of prohibition eliminated the need for the taxpayers' leagues.

==== Cedar County Cow War of 1931 ====
During the Iowa Cow War, the 700-member Farmers Protective Association vowed to refuse tax payments if the governor did not withdraw state troops and release an imprisoned resister.

==== Women's suffragists in Bermuda, 1931–34 ====
Women's suffragists in Bermuda, in particular Gladys Misick Morrell, refused to pay taxes unless they gained the vote.

==== Tithe Resistance in Britain, 1931–35 ====
As crop prices fell during the Depression, farmers in Great Britain began refusing to pay government-mandated church tithes. Resisters used a variety of tactics to resist government retaliation.

[T]hey have made conditions very unhappy for auctioneers selling property for non-payment of tithes. They have stampeded oxen so that the sale of them could not continue. They have browbeaten bidders so that prices adequate to pay the tithes have not been reached; they have stoned auctioneers, thrown them in ponds, plastered them with mud, slashed their tires, and organized mass resistance to tithe collecting in other ways.

==== Tyrol, Austria 1931 ====
Peasants' federations in eastern Tyrol resolved to stop paying taxes in October 1931 to protest bloated government, agricultural policy, profiteering, and a large tax burden.

==== Real Estate Taxpayers, 1931–33, 1977 ====
During the Great Depression in the early 1930s, Americans throughout the United States formed thousands of taxpayers' leagues to protest high property taxes. In some cases, these groups illegally withheld taxes through tax strikes and other forms of resistance. The largest tax strike was in Chicago and led by the Association of Real Estate Taxpayers. At its height, the Association had more than thirty-thousand dues-paying members.

A second, similar but smaller property tax payer's revolt hit Chicago in 1977.

==== Puerto Rico sales tax, 1932 ====
300 businesses in Ponce, Puerto Rico declared that they would refuse to continue to pay the sales tax after the United States governor of the island refused to repeal the tax.

==== Meo uprising, 1932 ====
The Meo, a group of Indian Muslims, revolted against taxes imposed by a Hindu maharaja in 1932, refusing to pay and resisting collection by force.

==== Elmira Taxpayers' League ====
Over a thousand taxpayers in Elmira, New York signed a pledge to refuse to pay local taxes until the municipal budget had been reduced, and tax rates as well.

==== New York City automobile owners, 1933 ====
The automobile club of New York organized an auto tax strike in 1933 to protest a doubled license fee for City residents.

==== Mennonite women in Pennsylvania, 1933 ====
Claiming that the Bible did not sanction the taxation of women, some women in Warwick township, Pennsylvania, refused to pay a poll tax in 1933.

==== Irish "Blue Shirts," 1935 ====
To protest Irish intransigence in the Anglo-Irish Trade War, the quasi-fascist "Blue Shirts" declared a tax strike. One striker was killed during a protest designed to disrupt an auction of cattle seized from a tax striker.

==== Meat tax strike, 1935 ====
In 1935, some Americans held a "Meat Strike" which was meant to protest New Deal-era taxes on meat processing by boycotting meat purchases. The offensive tax was eventually thrown out as unconstitutional.

==== French "Peasant Front," 1935 ====
The "Peasant Front," organized by Henri Dorgères, launched a tax strike in 1935. In some regions as many as 90% of the residents refused to pay their taxes, but the campaign had limited national impact.

==== Sales tax resistance in Montreal, 1935 ====
Mayor Hervé Ferland of Verdun led 164 or more shopkeepers there in refusing to collect or remit Montreal's sales tax.

==== Sales tax resistance in Arkansas, 1935 ====
98% of merchants in Stuttgart and 59 of 60 merchants in DeWitt signed a pledge to refuse to collect or pay a new Arkansas sales tax in 1935.

==== Sales tax resistance in Alabama, 1936 ====
Gadsden, Alabama merchants met and unanimously voted to refuse to collect or remit the state sales tax. Montgomery, Alabama pharmacists also resisted the tax.

==== Anti-communist Catholic veterans, 1938 ====
149 members of a Catholic war veterans fraternity began paying their property taxes into an escrow account rather than to the government, saying they would not turn over the funds until the local government dismissed Communist Party member Si Gerson who was an advisor to the Manhattan borough president.

==== Coal Township, 1939 ====
Taxpayers in Coal Township, Pennsylvania, threatened a tax strike to protest the fact that the large coal companies in the region had been neglecting to pay their taxes, causing the township to fall behind on schoolteacher salaries and other expenses. This forced some concessions from the coal companies.

==== World War II ====
During World War II, the Christian anarchist and pacifist Ammon Hennacy refused to register for the American draft and announced that he would not pay his income taxes. He also tried to reduce his tax liability by adopting a life of simple living. He wrote:

I [learned] the principle of voluntary poverty and non-payment of taxes... from Tolstoy and the CW. (Note: Catholic Worker) When I was working a man asked me "Why does a fellow like you, with an education, and who has been all over the country, end up in this out-of-the-way place working for very little on a farm?" I explained that all people who had good jobs in factories, etc. had a withholding tax for war taken from their pay, and that people who worked on farms had no tax taken from their pay. I told him that I refused to pay taxes. He was a returned soldier and said that he did not like war either, but what could a fellow do about it? I replied that we each did what we really wanted to.

==== Palestine, 1936–48 ====
In 1936, in what one author called "the first truly grass-root rebellion/uprising by Palestinians," 150 Palestinians called for a general strike and tax strike to protest against the British mandate.

Between 1939 and 1948, there was widespread resistance by Jews in Palestine against the income tax imposed by the British authorities, which included bomb attacks against tax offices, and many Jews instead voluntarily paid taxes to Jewish organizations. A few years after Israel gained its independence, its government became the target of widespread tax evasion and resistance, including a major tax strike in 1954.

==== Jews in Vichy France, 1944 ====
Jews refused to pay taxes to the Union générale des israélites de France (General Organization of Jews in France), which had been established by the Vichy France (Nazi-collaborationist) government. This Union was ostensibly meant to act as an umbrella organization that would organize social services for Jews by coordinating existing Jewish groups, but it was really a phase in the Nazi-organized obsession with bureaucratically solving the "Jewish Problem" in Europe via elimination. As in other parts of Nazi-controlled Europe, Jews in France had to make hard decisions about how much to resist such organizations outright and how much to try to participate in them as potential tools of resistance or amelioration.

All French Jews were required to be members of the Union, which presumed to control all Jewish property. The Nazis might, for example, "fine" the whole of the Jews of France, and the Union in its representative capacity would borrow money to pay off the fine by pledging Jewish property as collateral, or, apparently, by taxing the membership base.

==== Moslem League in India, 1946 ====
A punitive tax imposed on Muslims by the United Provinces government to discourage rioting was resisted in a refusal organized by the Moslem League.

==== Abeokuta Women's Revolt, late-1940s ====
The Abeokuta Women's Revolt (also called the Egba Women's Tax Riot) was a resistance movement against the imposition of unfair taxation by the Nigerian colonial government. The women of Abeokuta believed that, under colonialism, their economic roles were declining, while their taxes were increasing. Additionally, they argued that until they were granted representation in local government, they should not be required to pay taxes separately from men. As a result of their protests, four women received seats on the local council, and the taxation of women was ended.

==== School tax protest, France, 1947 ====
Catholic priests from Vendée, upset that the government was taxing Catholic fundraising events for Catholic schools to use the tax money to exclusively support non-Catholic schools, refused to pay the tax and went on trial in 1947.

==== The birth of the modern war tax resistance movement, 1948 ====
In 1948, a Chicago conference on "More Disciplined and Revolutionary Pacifist Activity" attracted more than 300 people, and resulted in the formation of the group Peacemakers and its "Tax Refusal Committee." This is considered to be the birth of the modern organized war tax resistance movement in the United States.

==== Monteverde, 1951 ====
Several Quaker conscientious objectors from the United States left the country and founded a settlement in Monteverde, Costa Rica, to no longer be forced to pay taxes for the United States military (Costa Rica had abolished its own military a few years earlier).

==== Oaxaca, 1952 ====
A general strike in Oaxaca in 1952 was directed against the government's new tax plan. Rioters in Tlacolula stoned to death mayor Diodoro Maldonado.

==== Pittston Township Wage Tax, 1952–53 ====
Hundreds of residents of Pittston Township, Pennsylvania refused to pay a new wage tax in 1952. The government responded by arresting 15 of them, and the resisters switched tactics to vastly underpay the tax as a way of resisting without risking immediate criminal sanctions.

==== South China, 1952 ====
Four hundred farmers were arrested for tax refusal in southern China in 1952. The farmers claimed that the taxes would leave them hopelessly impoverished.

==== Social Security tax protests, 1951–53 ====
In 1952, Louisiana newspaper editor Mary Cain protested against social security taxes by refusing to pay, concealing her assets, and even sawing the lock off of her business's front door when it was closed by the tax collector and mailing the lock to the Internal Revenue Service.

From 1951 to 1954, a group of "Texas Housewives" refused to pay social security taxes on the wages of their domestic help, and took their resistance all the way to the Supreme Court (where they lost their case).

==== Poujadism, 1955 ====
In 1955, a right-wing, anti-tax, middle-class, populist movement led by Pierre Poujade began resisting taxes in France. The resisters used a variety of tactics, including strikes, harassment of tax collectors, disruption of government auctions, and running for office (several Poujadists were elected to the Chamber of Deputies).

==== No Taxation Without Representation in D.C., 1955–present ====
In 1955 District of Columbia resident Florence Jaffray Harriman announced that she would be refusing to pay federal income tax until the federal government enacted "home rule" (a locally elected government) for the District (something the District was not granted until 1973).

In 1990, the non-voting Congressional representative from the district, Walter Fauntroy, started a similar tax resistance campaign for D.C. statehood.

Former District of Columbia council member Carol Schwartz, upset at the lack of Congressional representation for people in the district, threatened to start resisting her federal income taxes over the issue in 2011 and called on other D.C. residents to join her.

==== J. Bracken Lee, 1956 ====
Utah Governor J. Bracken Lee stopped paying federal income tax in 1956 to protest what he felt was unconstitutional federal spending. He hoped to become a test case, but the Supreme Court declined to hear his case.

==== The Amish exemption from U.S. social insurance, 1935–65 ====
In 1965 the United States Congress allowed the Amish to be exempt from the Social Security tax, following a persistent resistance campaign from some Amish who regarded insurance programs as mistrustful of God and therefore against their religious teachings. See 26 U.S.C. § 3127 and 26 U.S.C. § 1402(g) (this exemption also covers Medicare taxes).

==== Tax resistance in Ethiopia, 1943–68 ====
There were several outbreaks of armed resistance focused on tax complaints in Ethiopia. In some cases, farmers defaulted on their taxes and abandoned their land rather than pay, some fleeing into neighboring countries. In others, districts refused to elect or admit tax assessors, and used a mix of persuasion and coercion to prevent people from obeying the tax law.

==== Turks in Cyprus, 1958 ====
During the struggle over the future of Cyprus in the late 1950s, Turkish communities refused to pay taxes to Greek-run municipalities.

==== St. Regis Reservation resistance, 1959 ====
200 Indians on the St. Regis Mohawk Reservation in New York, led by Wallace "Mad Bear" Anderson, refused to pay state income taxes "and threatened to use summonses from the Tax Department 'to light the fires in our longhouses.'"

==== Tithe resistance in Malaysia, early 1960s ====
In 1960, the Malaysian government converted the traditional Islamic zakāt (tithe) paid voluntarily by rice farmers into a mandatory tax payable through the government. Opposition to the new government-controlled tithe was, at least in some places, "unanimous and vehement," and rice farmers developed a number of tactics to resist the tithes, successfully reducing the government's take to a fraction of what the law allowed.

==== Tax resistance by the "Johnson cult," 1964 ====
In the "Johnson cult" protest in Papua New Guinea (in which locals ostensibly intended to raise money to purchase U.S. President Lyndon B. Johnson and install him as their political leader), the protesters raised money for their unusual plan by withholding the £2 poll tax from the government.

==== A court in the United Kingdom rejects war tax resistance, 1968 ====
In 1968, in the UK case of Cheney v. Conn, an individual objected to paying a tax that, in part, would be used to procure nuclear arms in unlawful contravention, he contended, of the Geneva Conventions. His claim was dismissed by the court, the judge ruling that "What the [taxation] statute itself enacts cannot be unlawful, because what the statute says and provides is itself the law, and the highest form of law that is known to this country." There remains in the United Kingdom a significant movement of people who wish to withhold the percentage of their taxes used for war and weapons, but instead contribute them into a ring fenced pool for peace-building or peacekeeping purposes. This may be either for religious or economic reasons. See the website Peace Pays or the Peace Tax campaign "Conscience," which produces an alternative tax return form to document the withholding of the military percentage of your taxes (approximately 12% of the total tax bill in the UK).

==== Vietnam War, 1968–72 ====
In early 1968, 458 writers and editors put full-page ads in the New York Post, New York Times Book Review and Ramparts, declaring their intention to refuse to pay a proposed 10% Vietnam War surtax. The signatories included James Baldwin, Robert Bly, Noam Chomsky, Robert Creeley, David Dellinger, Philip K. Dick, Robert Duncan, Lawrence Ferlinghetti, Leslie Fiedler, Betty Friedan, Allen Ginsberg, Todd Gitlin, Paul Goodman, Edward S. Herman, Paul Krassner, John Leonard, Staughton Lynd, Dwight Macdonald, Jackson Mac Low, Norman Mailer, Peter Matthiessen, Milton Mayer, Ed McClanahan, Carl Oglesby, Tillie Olsen, Grace Paley, Thomas Pynchon, Adrienne Rich, Kirkpatrick Sale, Ed Sanders, Peter Dale Scott, Susan Sontag, Terry Southern, Benjamin Spock, Gloria Steinem, Norman Thomas, Hunter S. Thompson, Lew Welch, John Wieners, Kurt Vonnegut and Howard Zinn. An estimated 70 signed on later.

In 1970, five Harvard and nine MIT faculty members, including Nobel laureates Salvador E. Luria and George Wald, announced that they would be resisting taxes in protest of the war.

In 1972, Jane Briggs Hart, wife of U.S. Senator Philip Hart, said that she would be resisting the federal income tax. By this time, every major IRS center had a staff member assigned to be the "Viet Nam Protest Coordinator."

Also in 1972, the U.S. District Court for the Eastern District of Pennsylvania decided the case of United States v. Malinowski. That case involved John Paul Malinowski, an instructor in theology at St. Joseph's College and a member of the Philadelphia War Tax Resistance League protesting the use of tax money in the Vietnam War. The taxpayer had filed a false Form W-4, and admitted he knew that he was not legally entitled to claim the exemptions (that is, the allowances) he claimed on the W-4. Malinowski was convicted, and his motion for a new trial or acquittal was denied.

==== Agbękoya, 1968–69 ====
The Agbękoya Parapo Revolt was a successful tax rebellion by the Yoruba of Nigeria.

==== Papua New Guinea, 1969 ====
The Mataungan Organisation launched tax resistance in support of the indigenous government against a mixed indigenous/immigrant government in 1969.

==== Students Resist El Paso Sales Tax, 1969 ====
Calling it a tax on the poor to pay for business district improvements, delegates at the National Student Association Congress in El Paso, Texas in 1969 purchased American flags from a local retailer and refused to pay the penny sales tax on each flag, in a symbolic, media-friendly act of resistance.

==== Resistance to the Larzac base, 1970 ====
In 1970, when the French defense minister announced plans to expand a military base in Larzac, José Bové and other activists led a campaign to withhold 3% of their taxes (an amount they said was equivalent to the amount the government was spending on its base-expansion campaign) and redirect this money toward agricultural projects.

==== Opposition to school tax in Stormont County, Ontario, 1970 ====
Several property owners in Stormont County, Ontario, refused to pay a portion of their property tax in 1970 in a tax strike sponsored by the Ontario Federation of Agriculture to protest the burden on rural property owners caused by basing the tax on property value rather than income.

==== Bangladesh independence movement, 1971 ====
In March 1971, Sheikh Mujibur Rahman called for mass civil disobedience in the service of the independence of Bangladesh, saying that citizens should refuse to pay taxes or to cooperate with the government in other ways. According to one source "The no-tax directive of the Sheikh was followed so vigorously by both individuals and organizations that no one gave any taxes and no organization dared charge any. Even the two posh hotels of Dacca became accessible to middle-income people when food prices were drastically reduced for non-collection of taxes. The whole Income Tax Department was closed down making it quite impossible for the central government to assess and collect direct taxes from individuals and corporations."

==== Anti-abortion tax resistance, 1971– ====
Canadian anti-abortion activist Joe Borowski began refusing to pay federal income tax in 1971 in protest against government-funded abortions. David Little also refused to pay his Canadian federal taxes starting in 2000 for the same reason.

In 1973, Brendan Finnegan, an American farmer began refusing to pay his taxes, and said he would continue "until our government passes and enforces law to protect the unborn from abortion." Another American, John Kelly, expatriated with his family to Ireland in 1975 to avoid paying taxes for abortions in the United States. American Michael Bowman began refusing to pay federal taxes for reasons of conscientious objection to abortion funding in 1997, and has been fighting in court for the right to legally resist such payments since then.

The Pope John XXIII Community in Italy started practicing conscientious objection to taxation for abortion in 1990.

In 2009, Randall Terry, a prominent American anti-abortion activist, wrote:

As we pour our hearts and souls into the battle to keep the slaughter of the innocent by abortion out of any health care bill, the discussion has emerged as to whether it is an ethically viable option to refuse to pay part or all of our federal taxes.

Some well meaning souls have already—perhaps without much thought—repeated our Lord's oft quoted statement: "Render unto Caesar that which is Caesar's, and unto God that which is God's."

The simple question is this: does this statement of our Lord apply in a situation like the present? If we know that Caesar is going to use the money to kill our neighbor—one of God's children—are we required, by God Himself, to give the money to our political leaders?

I think the answer is self-evidently, "No!"

==== Efforts to legalize conscientious objection to military taxation, 1972– ====
In 1972 United States Congressman Ron Dellums introduced legislation that would legalize a form of conscientious objection to military taxation, allowing some taxpayers to designate their taxes for non-military spending only. Advocated by National Campaign for a Peace Tax Fund, this legislation is regularly reintroduced in the United States Congress and has a number of cosponsors. The legislatures of other countries are also considering similar legislation. Many war tax resisters support this, but others feel that such a law would not actually address the problem that leads them to resist taxation.

==== Refusing to pay an excise tax on air travel in the U.S., 1972 ====
When a $1- to $2-per-ticket air travel tax was applied to five airports in the United States in 1972, thousands of travelers refused to pay the tax.

==== Norwalk Taxpayers League, 1972 ====
The Norwalk Taxpayers League, led by Vincent DePanfilis, collected pledges from taxpayers that they would refuse to pay any more tax in the 1973–74 tax year than they had in 1972–73. This was a rare example of tax resistance during the American tax revolt movement of the 1970s.

==== Heinrich Böll refuses church tax, 1972 ====
In 1972, Heinrich Böll refused to pay a Catholic church tithe that had been made mandatory and was enforced by the German government.

==== Castine school tax resistance, 1975 ====
In Castine, Maine, residents voted to illegally refuse, as a town, to pay a state school tax, in 1975.

==== "A New Call to Peacemaking," 1976–78 ====
In 1976, 1977, and 1978, representatives from the United States' "peace churches" (Mennonites, Brethren, and Quakers) met to develop what they called a "New Call to Peacemaking," a joint statement in which they called on members of their congregations to refuse to pay taxes that go to pay for war.

==== Nicaragua, 1978 ====
In the last months of the Anastasio Somoza regime in Nicaragua, the opposition organized a tax strike.

==== United States, Proposition 13, 1978 ====
A wave of so-called tax revolts began in the United States in the late 1970s, and were particularly popular in the West. These were not revolts in the sense of illegal disobedience of authority, but got the moniker because large numbers of voters became active opponents of the policies of incumbent governments. In 1978, voters in California overwhelmingly passed Proposition 13, sponsored by Howard Jarvis, drastically limiting property tax levels in the state.

In subsequent years, the state initiative process, initially championed by Populists and progressives, has been increasingly used for such purposes by conservative and corporate political forces. In the United States, notable examples include a series of initiatives in Oregon (see Oregon tax revolt) and Washington (see Tim Eyman), the Taxpayer Bill of Rights (TABOR) in Colorado, and Proposition 2 1/2 in Massachusetts.

==== Sales Tax Boycott in Ottawa, 1981 ====
In 1981, a tax resistance campaign in Ontario targeted the provincial sales tax and included both merchants and consumers as participants.

==== Palestine, doctors in 1981 ====
Doctors in Gaza City refused to pay a 12% income tax to the Israeli occupation and were supported by a two-day general strike.

==== Archbishop Hunthausen resists, 1982 ====
In 1982, Catholic Archbishop Raymond Hunthausen of Seattle, Washington, announced that he would be refusing to pay half of his income tax in protest against the nuclear arms race.

Citing a previous pastoral letter he wrote on the subject, Archbishop Hunthausen stated that certain laws may he peacefully disobeyed under serious conditions, and that there may be times "when disobedience may be an obligation of conscience." "I believe," he said, "that the present issue is as serious as any the world has faced. The very existence of humanity is at stake."

==== Churches resist the social security tax, 1984 ====
The Quint City Baptist Temple in Iowa, the Indianapolis Baptist Temple, and several other churches refused to pay social security taxes on the wages of their employees, maintaining that it was unconstitutional to make them tax collectors for the government. The courts disagreed.

==== Irish Unionists, 1986 ====
The Democratic Unionist Party called on its supporters to refuse to pay taxes in protest against an Anglo-Irish settlement on the political status of Northern Ireland.

==== Beit Sahour, 1988–89 ====
In 1988–89, during the First Intifada, the Palestinian resistance urged people to stop paying taxes to Israel. At the time, The people of Beit Sahour responded to this call with an unusually organized and citywide tax strike. As a result of the tax strike, Israeli military authorities placed the town under curfew for 45 days and seized goods belonging to citizens in raids.

Israel's military forces had the authority, independent from the rest of the Israeli government, to create and enforce taxes in occupied areas. As a result, they would impose taxes on Palestinians as collective punishment measures to discourage the intifada, for instance "the glass tax (for broken windows), the stones tax (for damage done by stones), the missile tax (for Gulf War damage), and a general intifada tax, among others".

Among those prominent in Beit Sahour's tax resistance were Ghassan Andoni and Elias Rishmawi. Some tax resistance continued in Beit Sahour for some years after the end of the 1989 tax strike there

==== UK Poll Tax, 1989–93 ====
In 1989–90, the government of Margaret Thatcher reformed local taxation in Britain by replacing Domestic Rates with a new tax known officially as the Community Charge, but more widely and disparagingly known as the "Poll Tax". Whereas Rates had been, at least to some extent, a progressive tax, the Poll Tax was a flat tax irrespective of income. Many people considered the new tax to be unfair, and a major non-payment campaign saw up to 30% of the population of some council areas refusing to pay. Draconian enforcement measures caused civil unrest, and ultimately led to the Poll Tax riots. The new tax became a major electoral liability for the Conservative Party, and was a significant factor in the ousting of Mrs Thatcher by her own party. Due to its unpopularity and the disastrous impact of non-payment on local authority finances, the tax was replaced by the Council Tax in 1993.

==== Cameroon, 1991 ====
In 1991 Cameroon's major opposition political parties called for tax resistance in support of their campaign to end one-party rule.

==== Native Americans in Canada, 1994 ====
For 29 days in 1994, a group of Native Americans occupied one floor of the building housing the Revenue Canada Taxation Centre in downtown Toronto, in protest of Canada's plans to tax Native Americans who had previously been exempted from taxation as a result of treaty provisions. Many continue to resist the tax.

==== Water tax strike, 1994–96, 2007 ====
The Irish Congress of Trade Unions, among others, promoted a non-payment campaign against the government water monopoly in 2007. Irish water charges were abolished in December 1996, replaced with VAT and motor tax.

==== Lech Wałęsa in 1995 ====
In 1995, Poland's president Lech Wałęsa called for people to refuse to pay any higher income tax rates.

==== Onondaga Nation highway blockade, 1997 ====
Protesters upset at New York state's attempt to impose sales and excise taxes on the Iroquois in Onondaga Nation led residents to blockade Interstate 81 in May, 1997. Brutal arrests followed, with New York eventually paying $2.7 million to settle lawsuits filed by those arrested.

==== Zapatistas municipios autónomos ====
When the Zapatista Army of National Liberation moved from organizing armed resistance to the Mexican government to establishing autonomous villages—Rebel Zapatista Autonomous Municipalities—free from central government control, one of the things they did was to stop paying taxes to the outside governments.

==== Fuel tax protests, 2000 ====
In multiple areas of Europe, in 2000, people protested increases in motor vehicle fuel taxes by blockading ports, refineries, fuel depots, and highways.

==== Zimbabwe, 2000 ====
Opposition parties in Zimbabwe urged citizens to refuse to pay taxes to protest government misuse of funds in 2000.

=== 21st century ===
==== Same-sex marriage rights ====
In the United States, some gay people adopted a form of tax resistance to protest the government's lack of legal recognition of same-sex marriage.

==== UK council tax ====
In the United Kingdom, senior citizens in opposition to steep increases in council tax, claiming that increases of as much as 30% are not affordable to those living on a pension, refused to pay the tax in full or in part (some paying the previous year's amount plus an inflationary rise). One of these, Sylvia Hardy of Exeter, was jailed for seven days.

People have also resisted the council tax on the grounds that the government was not properly discouraging travellers from setting up camp nearby, or had failed to properly clean up hazardous waste on their property.

In 2013, Christopher Coverdale began refusing to pay his council tax on the grounds that the council was investing some of the money in promoting terrorist acts and war crimes.

==== Bin Tax protests, 2001–2005 ====
There was a long campaign of resistance to rubbish-hauling charges in Ireland.

==== Venezuelan opposition, 2003 ====
The political opposition to ruler Hugo Chavez launched a tax strike aimed at ending the Chavez regime's control.

==== "Flatulence Tax" resistance, 2003 ====
New Zealand farmers protested a livestock tax that was ostensibly designed to discourage and ameliorate methane emissions by announcing they would refuse to pay and by sending packages of manure to government ministers.

==== Vandalism of traffic-ticket-generating machines, 2004– ====
As governments around the world began to see the revenue-producing potential of traffic-ticket-generating cameras, drivers began to fight back. Examples of destruction or disabling of such machines have been registered in many countries.

==== Nepal, 2006 ====
Political parties in Nepal urged people to stop paying their taxes in 2006 as part of a push against the power of the monarchy.

==== Tijuana, 2006 ====
The Chamber of Commerce in Tijuana voted to pay taxes into an escrow account rather than to the government to protest the government's inability to provide adequate security.

==== Organized resistance to paying Mafia, 2006 ====
In 2006, after the arrest of Mafia boss Bernardo Provenzano, 100 shopkeepers in Palermo, Italy declared publicly that they would stop paying taxes to the Sicilian Mafia. They encouraged consumers to support the resisters by buycotting their stores.

==== Tehran Bazaar, 2008 ====
Government attempts to extend a value-added tax to cover the Tehran Bazaar were frustrated by a strike that shut down the Bazaar until the government gave in.

==== Nankang, China, 2009 ====
Protesters in Nankang "overturned police cars and blocked roads over plans to more strictly enforce payment of taxes."

==== Delhi lawyers, 2009 ====
Lawyers in Delhi, India went on strike in 2009 rather than pay a sales tax that the government was trying to extend to cover legal services.

==== Chascomús/Lezama secessionist struggle, 2009 ====
Groups on both sides of the debate over the secession of Lezama from the city of Chascomús used tax resistance to try to pressure the government into siding with them.

==== Vecinos Autoconvocados in Paraná, Argentina, 2009–10 ====
In February 2009, residents of Paraná, Argentina launched a property tax strike to protest large jumps in property assessment values. In March, residents of Justo Daract followed suit.

In 2010, residents of Villa Nueva announced a tax strike to protest against inadequate government services. Residents were also urged to refuse to pay taxes for roadwork that resisters alleged had already been paid for out of federal taxes.

==== PRD resistance in Indonesia, 2010 ====
Members of the small Partai Rakyat Demokratik launched a tax strike against president Susilo Bambang Yudhoyono in early 2010. Hundreds of protesters pledged to refuse to pay a tax, and as part of their protest, burned their Nomer Peserta Wajib Pajak (taxpayer identification) paperwork. Party chairman Sunu Pajar said, "we refuse to pay taxes as a form of resistance."

==== Luzerne County, 2010 ====
A Pennsylvania county government beset with corruption hiked taxes by 10% and some residents said no. One recorded a protest song entitled "Take This Tax and Shove It" and launched a tax resistance campaign.

==== San Juan, Argentina shopkeepers, 2010 ====
Shopkeepers in San Juan, Argentina, upset at being undercut by untaxed street vendors, announced a tax strike in 2010.

==== Tax refusal protests China's one-child policy ====
Yang Zhizhu and Chen Hong protested China's one-child policy by refusing to pay a 200,000 yuan fine on their second child.

==== Coventry "Axe the Tax" protest, 2010 ====
Hundreds of small businesses refused to pay a municipal tax in Coventry in 2010 and successfully had the tax (and the body that levied it) rescinded.

==== Tax protest and strike in Romania, 2010 ====
In August 2010 a tax strike was declared after newly introduced regulations were found to force freelancers and unincorporated companies waste over 24 man-hours each month on filling tax declarations and depositing those declarations in person at three different offices, in addition to forcing freelancers pay an unemployment insurance they cannot take advantage of. The new rules apply whether the freelancers or the unincorporated companies had any income or not, and declarations have to be submitted even for amounts less than €10.

==== Barinas, Venezuela transit licensees ====
In 2010, licensed public transit drivers in Barinas, Venezuela who were getting undercut by unlicensed, unofficial ones launched a tax strike to protest a lack of government protection for their privilege.

==== Ondarroa municipal tax strike, 2003–11 ====
The government responded to an organized municipal tax strike involving hundreds of households in Ondárroa in the Basque region of Spain by cutting the water supply to 120 homes and businesses there. The residents were supporters of a banned Basque nationalist political party and ended their strike (though without paying any of the previously resisted taxes) when they regained government representation under the banner of a new, legal party in 2011.

==== Ivory Coast, 2011 ====
Alassane Ouattara apparently won the presidential election in Ivory Coast over incumbent Laurent Gbagbo. Gbagbo disagreed and refused to leave office. Ouattara then called on the citizens of Ivory Coast to discontinue paying taxes to the Gbagbo government, which eventually was defeated. When Ouattara took power, however, his government began pursuing those resisters for back taxes.

==== Guinea-Bassau cashew traders strike, 2011 ====
Cashew merchants in Guinea-Bissau went on strike in April 2011 rather than pay a new export tax on cashews.

==== Tax resistance for Catalan Independence, 2011– ====
In July 2011, the Catalan nationalist group Òmnium Cultural, at its 50th anniversary meeting, called on citizens to redirect their taxes from the central government to a Catalan-run fund until such time as the government concedes more autonomy to the region.

In April, 2012, some Catalan separatists started paying their federal taxes into the Catalan treasury instead of submitting the money to the central Spanish government.

In October, 2012, the small town of Gallifa in Catalonia began tax resistance as a municipality by refusing to pay the income tax due on the salaries of the employees at the tax office.

By 2013, some 650 municipalities had begun turning their taxes over to the Catalan government rather than to the federal government. The tax resistance campaign is being organized by Catalunya Diu Prou ("Catalonia Says 'Enough'"), which says that some freelancers and independent businesses, which are responsible for their own tax withholding, will follow suit.

In 2019, another tax resistance initiative, Ni 1 euro x a la repressió ("Not one euro for repression") was launched. Modeled on the Spanish war tax resistance movement, it urged people stop paying and then to redirect the portion of their taxes that would otherwise go to pay for the Spanish monarchy, and those elements of the Spanish government that suppress Catalan independence. By this time, some 17,000 Catalan taxpayers were paying their federal taxes to the Catalan tax agency rather than to the Spanish one, in acts of civil disobedience. A reboot of this campaign launched in 2020 under the name Prou Monarquia ("Enough Monarchy"), boosted by former Catalan president Carles Puigdemont.

In 2020, Catalan president Quim Torra called on municipalities in Catalonia to withhold taxes from the central government's Spanish Federation of Municipalities and Provinces.

In early 2021, the city government of Vic, the capital of the Osona comarca, decided to stop remitting its taxes to the Spanish federal government, but instead to send those taxes to the Catalan government. The Catalan government currently forward these taxes to Spain, so for now this is mostly a symbolic campaign. Vic was soon joined by joined by Girona, capital of Girona province, and some other medium-sized towns.

Later that year, the separatist group "Council for the Republic" began asking individual resisters to redirect €300 of their taxes from the central government to the Republican Fund for Solidarity Action.

In 2022, the Catalan independence group Assemblea Nacional Catalana asked the Generalitat de Catalunya to give formal legal protection to taxpayers who send their taxes to the Catalan regional government rather than to the Spanish central government.

==== Road toll resistance in Argentina, 2011 ====
Argentine congresswoman Griselda Baldata noticed that nobody was maintaining the road on Route 36, but that the company in charge of maintenance was still collecting a toll. So she stopped paying and urged her constituents to do likewise.

==== Protests against European austerity measures, 2011– ====
During the Euro area crisis, some governments raised taxes and implemented harsh austerity measures to bring down the government budget deficits and satisfy international creditors. Some people and groups who opposed these measures adopted tax resistance as a protest tactic, for instance in Spain, Germany, Greece, Italy, Cyprus, and Ireland.

Before the victory of the Greek Syriza party in the 2015 elections, it had sponsored a "Have Not, Pay Not" tax resistance movement targeting the Enfia tax. The party's opposition to this tax was one of the factors in its popularity, and many people stopped paying the tax when it became likely that Syriza would win the elections and do away with the tax entirely.

But Syriza found itself unable to resist raising taxes when it came into power, and citizens fought back. One anarchist / antiauthoritarian coalition sabotaged more than 200 public transit fare-enforcement machines. The government, finding it difficult to raise money through straightforward taxation, increasingly relies on increases in fares, highway tolls, and utility bills. By 2017, 40% of Greeks were unable (or unwilling) to pay their utility bills. Some Greeks used devices that interfere with electricity meters, while others enlisted Den Plirono ("Won't Pay" movement) activists to reconnect the power to their homes when they were cut off for failure to pay the electric bill.

A similar "Don't Pay UK" movement emerged in response to steep rises in utility bills in the United Kingdom in 2022. This was followed by a German campaign, modeled on the UK one, called Wir zahlen nicht, and another in Lebanon, in 2023.

==== Resistance against the "household tax" in Ireland, 2012–15 ====
A group (including Teachtaí Dála Joe Higgins, Clare Daly, Joan Collins, Richard Boyd Barrett, Mick Wallace, Thomas Pringle and Séamus Healy, European Parliamentarian Paul Murphy, and councillors Ruth Coppinger and Ted Tynan) promoted a campaign of resistance against the "stealth tax" of increased household and water rates. A campaign spokesperson explained: "This is not a charge to fund your local community, it is a tax to fund private speculators, bondholders and the bailout. Our incomes and services are being decimated to pay this private debt. Now people have a chance to register their opposition by not registering for this tax. By not registering, we can make this a referendum on the bailouts for the rich and the cuts for us." By the deadline, only about half of the households in Ireland that were required to register and pay had done so. On 6 May 2013, the Revenue Commissioners reported that 1.2 million households (74%) have paid the property tax. In August 2013, the Revenue said 1.58 million households have paid the tax, and over €175 million has been collected. In 2014, Irish Water workers trying to install the water meters were met with blockades. In February 2015, Murphy and three others were arrested and then released without charges, reportedly part of an investigation into a November 2014 Jobstown protest that trapped Tánaiste Joan Burton in her car for over two hours.

==== Spanish autonomists, 2012–14 ====
Autonomists in Spain, under the banner "derecho de rebelión" (right of rebellion), launched a multifaceted tax resistance campaign designed to redirect taxes from the Spanish government (which they felt had overstepped Constitutional bounds and unlawfully usurped power) to locally organized autonomous projects.

==== Indonesia, 2012 ====
A tax resistance movement began in Indonesia in protest of the government's prioritizing of payments to bankers and other large bondholders during the economic downturn.

==== Honduras ====
Crime syndicates / protogovernments rule the streets in many parts of Honduras, and these often extort more money from their subjects than does the internationally recognized Honduran government. Some people resist these taxes, known locally as "impuesto de guerra" or "war tax," but the consequences of refusal can be, and frequently are, deadly. Eight bus company employees in Choloma, for instance, were gunned down in broad daylight, a block away from a police station and by attackers in police uniforms, in retaliation against drivers who did not pay the tax. In May, 2013 bus drivers there took collective action, going on strike to demand better security.

==== Salta, Argentina, 2013 ====
Guillermo Durand Cornejo, president of an Argentinian consumer rights organization called CODELCO, and a legislative representative, called on Salteños (citizens of Salta, Argentina) to refuse to pay a municipal tax, in the wake of property tax increases and new taxes in electricity and water bills.

"Until such time as the mayor gives a response to the people concerning the tax hike, I suggest that you do not pay this month's municipal tax," he said. "I call for civil disobedience."

Cornejo said he views a thirty-day tax strike as a wake up call for the government, and suggested that strikers who restrict their strike to a single month will not be subject to government reprisals.

==== Egypt, 2013 ====
Egyptian activists are withholding bus and subway fares as a protest against their government's continuing repression. "We are calling for civil disobedience—not to pay for the metro and buses..." one said. "They're taking that money and bringing tools to repress us. They bring bird shot, and tear gas, poison gas even."

==== Madagascar, 2013 ====
Businesses in Madagascar refused to submit taxes to the government, depositing the money in an escrow account instead. The businesses, which represent a large percentage of the country's tax base, were reacting to a crisis of stability and perceived legitimacy in the government. According to the chair of the Madagascar's Enterprises Union, "We no longer know with what kind of authorities we should deal at this stage."

==== Tax protesters in Canada ====
The tax protester phenomenon, which had long been part of the national tax scene in the United States, emerged as a difficulty for the Canadian government as well. By 2013, about 400 cases were pending in the Tax Court of Canada—"most using florid and arcane language and claiming bizarre laws that supersede or nullify Canada's regulations and laws; it prompted the Tax Court to adopt a triage approach to cope with the deluge, grouping cases and directing them to specific judges."

==== Bonnets rouges in Brittany, 2013–14 ====
In late 2013, a nationalist movement in Brittany called the bonnets rouges began destroying highway portals that were designed to tax truck transportation in the region. They eventually destroyed hundreds of these portals—as well as the tax office in Morlaix—leading the French government to abandon the tax.

==== Pos me salto in Mexico, passe livre in Brazil, and Planka.nu in Sweden, 2013–14 ====
When the Mexico City government hiked transit fares by two-thirds, frustrated commuters started leaping the turnstiles, both alone and in organized groups, in a form of protest they call pos me salto ("well, then, I'll jump").

At around the same time, a similar movement called passe livre was engaged in similarly motivated actions in Brazil.

The similar Planka.nu movement in Sweden went a step further, initiating a mutual insurance plan: For a €12 monthly fee, the plan insures contributors against any tickets they are given for being caught without a ticket—compare this to €100 for a monthly transit pass, or €150 for a fare evasion citation. The plan is running at a profit, taking in about twice as much from subscribers as it has had to pay out in fine reimbursements.

==== Crete, 2014–16 ====
Thousands of Cretans each paid only a single euro of their road taxes in a protest there. The action was organized by "People Stop Paying," a group that protested against rising taxes at a time of increasing economic difficulties, and that the taxes were not actually going to crucially needed road improvements. That group also organized protests at government auctions of seized property.

==== Tunisian taxi drivers, 2014 ====
Taxi drivers in Tunisia reacted to a new tax on motorists by posting signs in the windows of their cabs reading "I will not pay tax!" and daring the police to try to enforce the new taxes against them.

==== Businesses in Apatzingán, 2014 ====
Some business leaders in Apatzingán, a city in the Tierra Caliente region of Michoacán, finding that the government was giving them no protection from the Knights Templar Cartel, decided to stop paying taxes.

==== Euromaidan, 2014 ====
During the Euromaidan in Ukraine in early 2014, a group of business owners in Lviv announced that they would stop paying value-added and income taxes to the Ukraine central government of Viktor Yanukovych (taxes that went to maintain the military and internal security forces).

==== "Protesta fiscale ad oltranza", 2014 ====
In northern Italy, a group of small businesses united under the banner "protesta fiscale ad oltranza" (tax protest to the bitter end) refuse paying taxes, claiming that the Constitution requires the government to leave them enough to live on and that they should not be forced to borrow money to pay the government.

For example, when bed and breakfast owner Alessandra Marazzi discovered that fully 84% of what she was bringing in was going to pay taxes and state-monopolized utility fees, she decided to stop paying taxes just so her business (and her family) could survive. Caterer Andrea Polese stopped paying and put a sign on her door reading "I am a tax resister." Bar owner Mariano Pavanello posted a selfie with a sign saying "I decided to stop paying protection money to a state thief."

==== Venetian independence movement, 2014–19 ====
After the majority of Venetians who responded to a plebiscite voted to secede from Italy and restore the Venetian Republic, one of the first acts of the organizers of the plebiscite was to decree that the people of Venice were now free from obligations to pay taxes to the Italian state. Gianluca Busato, one of the drivers behind the initiative, went so far as to say that "The payment of taxes to foreign governments [e.g. Italy's], as well as immoral, it's illegal." The separatists claimed that 3,407 businesses initially signed on to the tax strike, and as many as 93,000 others may be resisting less openly.

In 2016, the government struck back, arresting 20 people in 19 raids in Vicenza, Treviso, and Verona and charging them with inciting tax evasion.

In 2019, separatists again refused to pay their federal taxes to Italy, redirecting them instead to Veneto State.

==== Anti-corruption resistance in Austria, 2014 ====
Some business owners in Austria, notably Wolfgang Reichl and Gerhard Höller, began paying their federal taxes into escrow accounts rather than turning them over to the government, largely in protest over the Hypo scandal. Höller launched a project called Der Steuerstreik ("the tax strike") in an attempt to get more business owners to participate in tax resistance.

==== Wakulima market vendors, 2014 ====
Hundreds of vendors at the Wakulima market in Nakuru, Kenya, refused to pay taxes to the county government in June, 2014 in a tax strike to protest the government's failure to provide the market the sanitation and sewage services the taxes ostensibly pay for.

==== Pakistan Tehreek-e-Insaf, 2014 ====
In August, 2014, Imran Khan, leader of Pakistan Tehreek-e-Insaf, a prominent political party in Pakistan, gave a speech in which he called for a "civil disobedience movement" in which "we will not pay taxes, electricity or gas bills," to the central government, in hopes of forcing the resignation of Pakistan's prime minister Nawaz Sharif.

Khan's party was in charge of the government in the Khyber Pakhtunkhwa province, and that government itself planned to withhold its federal taxes and utility payments. Asked what they would do if the government responded by cutting off utility service to the province, province Information Minister Mushtaq Ghani said that they would retaliate by cutting off the neighboring province of Punjab from the power generated by the Tarbela Dam, which is located in Khyber Pakhtunkhwa.

==== Umbrella Movement, 2014–15 ====
As Hong Kong's Umbrella Movement began to move away from the Occupy Central mode of street protests, it began to promote tax refusal and refusal to pay rent in government-run housing. Benny Tai Yiu-Ting, one of the movement's organizers, wrote: "Blocking government may be even more powerful than blocking roads. Refusal to pay taxes, delaying rent payments by tenants in public housing estates and filibustering in the Legislative Council, along with other such acts of noncooperation, could make governing more inconvenient. No government can govern effectively if the majority of its people are unwilling to cooperate."

==== Puerto Rico, 2015 ====
Foes of a new 16% value-added tax in Puerto Rico launched consumer and business strikes there, including a "No Consumption Day" on 3 March 2015.

==== Vitebsk, Belarus, 2015 ====
Merchants at the Polatsk marketplace in Vitebsk, Belarus went on strike and refused to pay taxes in March, 2015 to protest government harassment of traders who had not purchased enough official paperwork.

==== Ethiopian-Jewish Israelis, 2015 ====
Police brutality, discrimination, and mistreatment towards Israel's Ethiopian Jewish minority led Shlomo Molla, one of the few Ethiopian-Israelis to have been in the Israeli parliament, to call for tax resistance, refusal to serve in the army, and other forms of civil disobedience.

==== Beni, D.R. Congo, 2015–22 ====
Residents of Beni, Democratic Republic of the Congo, launched a tax strike to protest the government's failure to provide them with adequate security against atrocities committed by the Allied Democratic Forces insurgency. The tax resistance was preceded by a week-long general strike, and later spread to other parts of North Kivu.

Tax strikes are a popular method of political action in North and South Kivu. Other such strikes have pressured the government to improve transportation infrastructure among other issues.

==== Githurai market vendors, 2015 ====
Market vendors in Githurai, Kenya withheld taxes from the county government to protest the government's unwillingness or inability to provide basic services to the market.

==== Prino condominiums, 2015 ====
Fifty condominium owners in Prino, Italy, stopped paying the "IMU" municipal property tax to protest the city's neglect of public spaces, including a filthy public square with a broken fountain that's become a rubbish heap, poor upkeep of drainage that leads to flooding, and bad traffic management.

==== Patadar community, 2015 ====
The Patidar community in Gujarat, in pursuit of government-protected minority status, coordinated bank runs and tax resistance in an "economic non-cooperation" movement.

==== Crickhowell, 2015 ====
The town of Crickhowell, in a protest against the use of tax havens by multinational companies, decided to try to use the same tax haven strategies on a small scale. They teamed up with a television show to try to "offshore" the town in the hopes of spurring the government into closing the loopholes that allow such tax avoidance.

==== Russian truckers, 2015–16 ====
A new tax on heavy-weight truckers in Russia, and corruption in the way the tax would be administered, led to a trucking strike that unsettled the Putin regime.

==== Mexican areas, 2015–16 ====
Residents of Uruapan started withholding municipal taxes in 2015, using the money to fund private Neighborhood Watch groups, in exasperation at the inability of law enforcement to protect them from criminals. Resisters also refused to pay certain utility rates. Businesses in Huatulco and Acapulco followed suit in 2016.

==== Eastleigh, 2016 ====
Business owners in Eastleigh, Nairobi stopped paying taxes to Nairobi County in protest against the government's failure to provide basic services. Eastleigh North Ward representative Osman Adow Ibrahim, a member of the County Assembly, wrote: "As your representative, I fully support the decision you have made and have engaged a lawyer to get an injunction through the courts. The law and Constitution of Kenya allows for peaceful protest to get one's rights. I hope we all stand together on this, so that we get the service we need."

==== Indian taxpayers union, 2016 ====
Anjali Damania and Alyque Padamsee started a taxpayers union and launched a tax strike to protest government corruption in India. They were emboldened by a ruling from Justice Arun Chaudhari of the Nagpur bench of Bombay High Court, in which he said

To eradicate the cancer of corruption—the "hydra-headed monster," it is now a high time for the citizens to come together to tell their governments that they have had enough. That is the miasma of corruption. If the same continues, taxpayers may resort to refuse to pay taxes by "non-cooperation movement."

Among their tactics was to print up "zero rupee" notes, resembling currency but containing anti-corruption messages, that people could hand to government officials who demand bribes.

==== Gay rights tax resistance in Italy ====
Tommaso Cerno, a journalist and gay rights activist in Friuli, Italy, announced, in a letter published in Repubblica, a tax strike for gay rights.

==== Jewelers in India, 2016 ====
Jewelers in India staged an 18-day strike to protest a new excise tax on gold sales. The government agreed to suspend collection of the charge pending the report from a committee that was formed to look into the jewelers' grievances. The jewelers are estimated to have lost some $4.5 billion in sales during the strike. This is the third time the government has suspended the tax in response to protests.

==== Terrorist victims' families in France, 2016 ====
Families of victims of the November 2015 Paris attacks said they would refuse to pay the taxes due from their dead family members, complaining that it was insulting to tax the victims to pay for, among other things, the salaries of the public defenders representing the terrorist suspects.

==== Trieste, 2016 ====
Hundreds of separatists in the Province of Trieste stopped paying taxes to the Italian government in 2016.

==== Gasolinazo resistance in Mexico, 2017 ====
When the government of Mexico partially-privatized the state-run gasoline monopoly, gas prices rose sharply, contrary to the promises of the politicians who implemented the policy. This led to a variety of tax resistance actions from the citizenry, among other actions. In Uruapan, for example, several citizens' groups occupied the Treasury and Revenue Administration departments to prevent tax collection.

==== Ouanaminthe workers, 2017 ====
Workers in the Codevi (Free Trade Zone) in Ouanaminthe, Haiti went on strike in February, 2017, to protest a new 10% tax on their wages.

==== Mass resistance to "Vagrants Tax" in Minsk, 2017 ====
A so-called "Vagrants Tax" in Minsk, Belarus was met by widespread resistance, with fewer than 10% of taxpayers complying with the law.

==== Coffee bootlegging in Greece, 2017 ====
When the government of Greece attached a 20% tax to coffee imports, a group called Cafe Justicia began smuggling fair trade coffee from Guatemala into Greece to help Greeks to avoid the tax.

==== GST rollout in India, 2017 ====
India began to roll out a nationwide goods-and-services tax (GST) in 2017 to replace a patchwork of regional taxes. But not all of the regions revoked their complementary taxes, and some industries that were formerly untaxed or taxed at a low rate were newly taxed or taxed at a higher rate. This led to protests.

For example, textile workers in Chandigarh shut their shops to protest the new tax structure, and a thousand movie theaters in Tamil Nadu shut to protest that state's 30% entertainment tax which applied in addition to the new 18–28% goods-and-services tax.

Textile workers went further in September, selling their products without GST fees attached, in a "tax denial satyagraha" or civil disobedience campaign. In October, filmmakers in Kollywood halted all new film releases to join the protest by Tamil Nadu theaters.

==== Tax protest against refugee settlement in Italy, 2017 ====
Forty business owners in Italy refused to pay taxes in 2017 to protest the government's plans to house refugees near their businesses.

==== Business strikes in Ethiopia, 2017 ====
Businesses in Addis Ababa, Ethiopia, and nearby towns went on strike in July, 2017 to protest tax hikes on small businesses. Residents also began "posting pictures of damaged public infrastructures such as roads, schools, and hospitals on social media to make a point that taxes collected are simply embezzled [rather] than used to improve people's lives."

More than five hundred merchants were jailed in Bahir Dar for refusing to pay a tax, and many others closed their shops rather than pay.

==== Republican Party calls for tax refusal in Seattle, 2017 ====
When the Seattle city government enacted a municipal income tax, arguably in violation of Washington state law, the Washington State Republican Party called on citizens to refuse to pay. "This law is unconstitutional, illegal, and against the voter's [sic] will expressed nine (9) times at the ballot box and it deserves nothing less than civil disobedience—that is, refusal to comply, file or pay."

==== Gurugram tax revolt, 2017 ====
The Municipal Corporation of Gurugram was formed in 2008. It made questionable claims to be able to govern and tax various parts of the region. Representatives from 46 villages that the Corporation attempted to tax unanimously voted to refuse to pay property tax to the Corporation in August, 2017, saying that it lacks authority to tax them.

==== Tax strike in Kasai-Oriental, 2017 ====
In protest against the government's refusal to allow democratic elections in the Democratic Republic of the Congo, the Kasai-Oriental province chapter of the Union for Democracy and Social Progress, one of the country's largest political parties, declared a tax strike in October, 2017.

Taxes and duties contribute to the development and welfare of the general citizenry. This is not the case in the DRC, where taxes and duties go essentially to the enrichment of a clique, to the detriment of the national community which is subject to miseries of all kinds.... So I ask the Congolese people in general, and those of Kasai in particular, not to pay taxes from October 1 until the departure of the current administration. The call to disobedience is for us a means to defeat the power of [Congo president Joseph] Kabila.

Lutte pour le changement signed on to the campaign, asking citizens to stop paying taxes, utility bills, fees, royalties, and licenses until Kabila steps down.

==== Toll resistance in Urabá, 2018 ====
Demonstrators in Urabá, Colombia, burned down two newly-installed highway tollbooths in January, 2018.

==== Water-tax resistance in Zaragoza, 2018 ====
Pablo Hijar, city councilor of Zaragoza, Spain, from the Zaragoza en Común Party (a left-wing alliance), tweeted out a photo of himself tearing up his bill for the regional tax ICA, claiming that the tax is a boondoggle designed to force Zaragoza residents to pay for other regions' sewer treatment plants. "#IWon'tPay the #ICA," he tweeted "We want accountability... and rates that are fair (progressive) and transparent (in their purposes)." Early reports indicated that a third of Zaragoza households had joined Hijar in refusing to pay the tax.

==== Hartal in Mogadishu, 2018 ====
Traders in the Bakaara Market in Mogadishu closed their doors in a hartal to protest tax hikes in February, 2018.

==== Nicaragua, 2018 ====
Tax resistance featured as one of the tactics employed in the 2018–2020 Nicaraguan protests. The Nicaraguan Academy of Sciences and Academy of Legal and Political Sciences called for people to stop paying utility bills and taxes. Merchant Irlanda Jerez led a similar tax and utility bill strike in the Mercado Oriental in Managua, before her imprisonment. Student protest leaders in the University Alliance for Democracy and Justice called on Nicaraguans to refuse to pay taxes and to boycott businesses owned by political elites. And the Blue & White National Unity group called for a three-day consumer strike and energy strike, aiming particularly at those consumer goods like fuel, alcoholic beverages, sodas, and tobacco that are most taxed.

==== Ambazonian separatists in Cameroon, 2018 ====
Tax resistance, organized in part via the officially banned media outlet Ambazonia TV, has featured in the Ambazonia independence movement in Cameroon.

==== Gilets jaunes protests in France, 2018–19 ====
In 2018, Emmanuel Macron pursued a petrol tax in France, albeit, the tax stems from an earlier policy under his predecessor, François Hollande. A burgeoning grassroots movement, the Gilets jaunes protests developed throughout France in November, extending even to the overseas territory of Réunion. The movement began with mass demonstrations of hundreds of thousands of people, along with traffic blockades. The blockades then extended to ports, refineries, and oil depots, leading to fuel shortages in some areas. There were also attacks on highway tollbooths.

Macron's government held firm until December, attempting to crack down on the movement with measures that Amnesty International characterized as including "rubber bullets, sting-ball grenades and tear gas against largely peaceful protesters who did not threaten public order and... numerous instances of excessive use of force by police." The government then announced it was putting the fuel taxes on hold.

Meanwhile, traffic-ticket-generating speed radar outposts throughout France were being destroyed by protesters. This was a form of protest that preceded the gilets jaunes movement, but accelerated during it. Thousands of such attacks were documented in 2018. Some attacks only temporarily disabled the radars (by means such as tape, bags, or spraypaint) but hundreds resulted in their total destruction. Eventually about two-thirds of the radar outposts across the country were attacked, costing the government more than half a billion euros. Newly-repaired radars were being so quickly disabled that the government stopped trying to repair damaged ones.

==== Transport strike in Kenya, 2018 ====
When the government of Kenya added a 16% tax to petroleum products, transporters launched a strike, leading to fuel shortages in Nairobi. "Kenya's energy regulator has revoked the license of the Kenya Independent Petroleum Distributors Association for allegedly leading the fuel boycott," a news report said, "equating their action to economic sabotage."

==== Luján agriculturalists, 2018 ====
In Luján, Argentina, a local tax on farmers rose 1200%. In response, an assembly of farmers voted to stop paying, and the National Network of Independent Producers supported the strike.

==== "Electronic City" residents, 2019– ====
Some residents of the "Electronic City" tech zone in Bangalore, India, have been refusing to pay property taxes to protest the government's broken promises regarding infrastructure and trash disposal.

==== Guanare merchants, 2019 ====
The Chamber of Commerce in Guanare, Venezuela, declared a merchants' tax strike when the city unilaterally established a new tax without going through legal processes.

==== Pakistan merchants, 2019 ====
Merchants in Pakistan went on strike in July 2019 in a protest against new sales taxes.

==== Delta Amacuro chamber of commerce, 2019 ====
The Delta Amacuro, Venezuela state Chamber of Commerce launched a tax strike to protest what it said were extralegal and "confiscatory" municipal taxes.

==== Barcelona, 2019– ====
A group of towns surrounding Barcelona organized a tax refusal campaign protesting a "Barcelona Metropolitan Area" tax they say benefits city residents at their expense. Tax receipts shrank by about 25% over the course of the multi-year strike.

==== Protest against Alberta fossil fuel polluters, 2020 ====
In January 2020, David Swann, former head of Alberta, Canada's Liberal Party and former provincial legislator, announced he would go on tax strike. He was protesting the fact that economically struggling fossil fuel extraction companies in Alberta were refusing to pay their local taxes, while leaving local governments on the hook for the cleanup of their extraction facilities and sites. "I am not paying my provincial taxes until these companies pay theirs," Swann said. "I urge others to join me. Our government shouldn't have one set of rules for their corporate friends, and another for the rest of us Albertans."

==== Italian restaurateurs and other businesses, 2020–21 ====
Restaurant owners in the Marche region of Italy, suffering under mandated closures due to the 2020 coronavirus pandemic, launched a tax strike in April 2020. "We are going on a tax strike because we can't pay because our businesses are closed forcibly," said strike organizer Lucio Pompili.

They were joined towards the end of the year by thousands of businesses in Tuscany, led by the Tuscan branch of Confcommercio (the Italian General Confederation of Enterprises, Professional Activities and Self-Employment), whose president announced:

Our companies have no more resources, and we prefer to continue to pay employees and suppliers as a priority over a state that does not understand—indeed tramples on—our reasons for existing.

Bars and restaurants in Cesena launched a tax strike soon after and publicized their protest by symbolically opening their establishments and having their staff wait on empty tables.

The strike further expanded in early 2021 when the General Confederation of Italian Industry promoted a tax strike among its members under the "Movimento Imprese Ospitalità" banner.

==== Vancouver residents, 2020 ====
Neighbors of a homeless encampment in Vancouver withheld their taxes in an attempt to pressure the government to provide more adequate assistance than was being provided to those camped there. The neighbors signed a Declaration of Tax Resistance in Demand of Community Safety that read in part: "we, the undersigned Strathcona homeowners, declare our intention to withhold property tax payments to the City of Vancouver—by way of deferral, assessment appeal, or other lawful means—until such time as our municipal, provincial, and federal governments act together or individually to meet the following… demands."

==== Extinction Rebellion, 2020–22 ====
The Extinction Rebellion environmentalist direct action group launched a tax resistance campaign it called "Money Rebellion" to pressure governments in the UK to adopt more ecologically enlightened policies.

A related environmental campaign, aimed at shutting down the Edmonton Incinerator, attracted more than a dozen council tax resisters in North London in late 2021.

==== Myanmar, 2021 ====
In the wake of the 2021 Myanmar coup d'état, the national legislature, in protest, passed a law suspending tax collection and ordered government departments to stop collecting taxes. In addition, individual resisters began refusing to pay taxes and government-monopoly utility bills. A coalition of student unions released a statement asking international companies to withhold taxes from the military junta. The opposition parallel government ("National Unity Government") joined the call for citizens to stop paying electric bills. The junta responded by sending soldiers door to door to threaten to kill resisters who have been refusing to pay government bills.

==== Ituri, 2021 ====
Groups in the Ituri Province of the Democratic Republic of the Congo launched a tax resistance campaign aiming at forcing the resignation of the governor, whom they blame for degraded security in the province.

==== Argentina, 2021 ====
Restaurants in Rosario, Santa Fe, Argentina launched a tax strike, and were soon joined by gymnasiums. The businesses say they cannot afford taxes during Covid pandemic-related restrictions that prevent them from operating at capacity. They were joined by hotels in Mar del Plata.

==== Baltimore, 2021 ====
A group of 37 businesses in the Fell's Point, Baltimore signed on to a letter threatening to stop paying municipal taxes and fees (paying them instead into an escrow account) until the city meets its demands for better security, trash collection, and law-enforcement.

==== Biafra Nations League, 2021 ====
The Biafra Nations League, which is trying to establish a break-away nation more representative of the Igbo people, issued an ultimatum to oil firms in the area, ordering them to stop paying taxes to Cameroon and Nigeria, which currently claim sovereignty over the region.

==== Turkey, utility bills, 2022 ====
In February, 2022 Turkish opposition politician Kemal Kılıçdaroğlu announced his refusal to pay his utility bills until recent 50% price hikes are revoked. Some Alevist cemevis also stopped paying. He later addressed his supporters from his home after his electricity was shut off for non-payment.

==== Castro District, 2022 ====
The Castro Merchants Association, representing businesses in San Francisco, California's Castro district protested the city's ineffective response to mentally-ill and/or addicted people living outdoors on city streets by sending a letter to city officials demanding that the city take more effective action and threatening to "stop paying taxes and stop paying the fees for licenses because the city is not providing the services that are supposed to be guaranteed based on what we're paying to the city."

==== Marimanti merchants, 2022 ====
Merchants at the Marimanti, Kenya, market organized a tax strike to protest county government failure to maintain toilet facilities at the market.

==== Climate change resistance, 2023 ====
A group of people from the Netherlands called Belastingstaking voor Klimaat ("Tax Strike for Climate") began refusing to pay a 5% portion of their income taxes to protest government subsidies of fossil fuels and other CO_{2}-generating industries, which they estimate amounts to 5% of the government budget. In addition to this resistance, they are using the official tax adjustment and appeals process to fight for the legality of such resistance.

==== Palestinian resistance in East Jerusalem, 2023 ====
Palestinian residents of East Jerusalem launched a tax strike along with other civil disobedience actions to protest an accelerating campaign of "harassment and aggression" by Israeli police under the Thirty-seventh government of Israel.
