= Catalunya Diu Prou =

Catalunya Diu Prou (Catalonia Says Enough) is a civil platform that has been driven by two entities, Ara o Mai ( Now or Never) and CADCI, and with the support and collaboration of other associations, like Welcome Mr. President, and also by individually members. Its main objective is to implement and support all activities that cause changes and policy responses, that allow Catalonia to become an independent state.

Catalunya Diu Prou (Catalonia Says Enough) work on different types of actions, and therefore uses different means. Some are civil resistance actions, others are actions at law, and some are directly working on the street.

== Fiscal sovereignty movement. Catalan fiscal sovereignty. Payment of taxes in Catalonia ==
The aim is to achieve full fiscal sovereignty for Catalonia. This movement wants that the taxes of the Catalan citizens remain in Catalonia. So for the last 5 quarters, dozens of businessmen and freelancers pay their taxes to the Tax Catalan Office, instead of doing it in Spanish agency. In the last three quarters fifty councils have added to this initiative.

In July 2013, “L’Associació de Municipis per la Independència” (Association of Municipalities for Independence ) –AMI-, which includes nearly 700 municipalities, 80% of all of Catalonia, approved following the path taken by Catalunya Diu Prou (Catalonia says enough), and asked all its municipalities to pay their taxes to the Tax Catalan Office this year.

== Report by the difficulty of Catalans vote in elections abroad 25-N ==
Catalunya Diu Prou (Catalonia says it is enough) allow to all Catalans living abroad, the opportunity to make a complaint against the collective responsibility that prevented thousands of people from abroad to vote in Catalan elections of 25 November 2012. It may be a crime of discrimination, "because there has been a systematic denial of the vote by Spanish embassies and consulates, based on difficulty and the impossibility of obtaining the documentation to the catalans. A total of 150,346 voters living abroad could not vote, according to the statement, and only 5% of the applicants were able to overcome the process and exercise their right to vote. Which is systematic neglect to consider the possibility that you are committing a crime election. Together with the web world “Catalans al Món” (Catalans in the world), were collected about 40 complaints and more than 450 emails reporting the difficulties that Catalan from outside Catalonia, had to vote. All this material were presented in The Court.

== Complaint for incitement to hatred and violence against Catalonia ==
Action: Catalonia says enough presented a complaint against Colonel in the reserve, Francisco Alamán Castro, who threatened military intervention against Catalonia, and incited violence against the sovereignty, despising the rule of law and democracy. The complaint was filed by "threats, sedition and advocacy of genocide, among other crimes."

The Court in Catalonia accepted the prosecution claim, but after The Spanish Court decided archiving it, arguing freedom of expression and speech comparing the violence to the right to expressa he wish of self-determinations of Catalonià citizens.

They also give legal advice to persons that have been fined or arrested for carrying or exhibiting independence flags inside sports stadiums.

== Legal advice to the participants in the campaign against tolls on motorways(#novullpagar) ==
The grievance involved in Catalonia are that we paid tolls on motorways, while in the rest of the state are almost nonexistent, led a movement to refusal to pay, a campaign with the name #novullpagar (I don’t want to pay)

When the campaign started Catalunya Diu Prou (Catalonia Says Enough), made available to the participants in the campaign legal advice. We produce different legal reports, which were echoed in the press, and we also created more than thirty legal documents that can be downloaded from our website for the people who receive sanctions for their participation in the campaign. We have also answered some 8,000 emails related to the issue, and manage thousands of files affected by the sanctions.

Also the two principals associations of Cayalunya Diu Prou (Catalonia Says Enough), Ara o Mai (Now or Never) and CADCI, signed a collective document in The Catalan Parliament with the parties that supported the campaign.
