= George Cony =

English merchant imprisoned for disobeying Oliver Cromwell (17th C.)

George Cony was an English merchant who defied Oliver Cromwell's authority to institute taxes without parliamentary approval by refusing to pay them, in a celebrated case of civil disobedience and tax resistance.

== Confrontation with Cromwell ==
In December 1653, Cromwell dismissed the Barebones Parliament and assumed more direct ruling powers under The Protectorate. As the parliament had not voted a budget before its dissolution, Cromwell decided in March 1654 to order taxes on his own authority, contrary to established law which had put the authority to levy taxes solely in the hands of parliament.

On 4 November 1654 George Cony refused to pay these taxes (in the form of customs duties on goods which he imported), on the grounds that they were "an imposition notoriously against the law, and the property of the subject, which all honest men were bound to defend." Cony noted that Cromwell himself had once said "that all who submitted… and paid illegal taxes, were more to blame, and greater enemies to their country, than they who had imposed them; and that the tyranny of princes could never be grievous, but by the tameness and stupidity of the people."

== Imprisonment ==
Cony was fined for his refusal by the customs commissioner on 16 November, and upon refusing also to pay the £500 fine, was imprisoned on 12 December 1654.

Cony's attorneys (Sir John Maynard, Twisden and Wyndham) sued for his release under habeas corpus and argued on 17 May 1655 that Cony's imprisonment, and the tax he was accused of evading, were both illegal. For this, these attorneys were also imprisoned the following day, "for using words tending to sedition and subversive of the present Government." They abandoned their client's defence and expressed their contrition in a petition of 25 May, in order to secure release, whereupon Cony was forced to represent himself.

The chief justice who tried the case, Henry Rolle, was evidently sympathetic to Cony's arguments, but unwilling to cross Cromwell's power. He had the case delayed to a future term on the pretense of there having been an improperly formatted brief, and on 7 June he resigned his position. George Radcliffe wrote:

In England there is great expectation what wilbe comme of Conyes busines; it is put off till the next terme, and mens eyes are attent upon it, as more concerned then at any thinge which happened these many yeares. Cromwell, when he committed Maynard and Twisden and another lawyer, tould them that, if they would have Magna Carta (which they had talked so much on in Westminster Hall), they must put on each a helmet and troope for it! And now they see what they fought for. Here is the liberty of ye subject.

Under the succeeding judge, John Glynne, Cony withdrew his case under pressure, without a formal decision having been issued about his arguments.
