= Tancament de caixes =

Tax strike in Barcelona in 1899

The tancament de caixes ("closing of the cashboxes") was a tax strike in the period of July to November 1899 in Barcelona by merchants and industrialists against tax hikes put in place by the Francisco Silvela cabinet and his minister of the Treasury, Raimundo Fernández Villaverde in order to pay for the expenses of the Spanish–American War.

The protest consisted of shutting down business and industrial establishments as a form of hartal which allowed them to stop paying tax without it being illegal. The protest was led by the mayor of the city, Dr. Bartomeu Robert.

The shutting of the cashboxes was caused by the colonial crisis of 1898, which led the Spanish government to impose some restrictive budgets along with an increase in taxation to compensate for the deficit. The protest was primarily against the corporate and personal income tax, and that on personal bonds, which had higher rates in Barcelona than in Madrid. That created a feeling of having been betrayed among the Catalan bourgeoisie, as they had fought alongside the dynastic parties.

The board of the Industrial & Commercial League of Defense issued a call to protest. A Permanent Union Board was chosen, representing more than fifty Barcelona guilds. The government declared a state of emergency. The protest extended to Sabadell, Mataró, Manresa and Villafranca del Penedes, and some business-owners were arrested for not paying taxes.

== Consequences ==
- the resignation of Barcelona mayor Doctor Robert (1842-1902)
- the resignations of the Spanish government ministers Manuel Durán i Bas (1823-1907) and Camilo Garcia of Polavieja and Castillo
- the alienation of the Catalan middle class from the Spanish government and consequent strengthening of Catalan nationalism
