= Angela (given name) =

- Pronunciation: /ˈændʒɪlə/ AN-jil-ə; German: [ˈaŋɡela, aŋˈɡeːla] Italian: [ˈandʒela] Slovak: [ˈaŋɡela] Portuguese: [ˈɐ̃ʒelɐ] Russian: [ˈanɡʲɪlə]
- Gender: Female
- Language: Greek

Origin
- Meaning: angel

Other names
- See also: Angie, Aniela, Angel, Angelina, Angeline, Angelica, Angelita, Angelis, Anghela, Angella, Angelle, Angelea, Ángela, Ângela, Anġela, Anjel, Anxhela, Angjela, Gelya

Angela is a female given name. It is derived from the Greek word ángelos (ἄγγελος), meaning angel from Greek belief systems. In the United States, the name "Angela" was at its most popular between 1965 and 1979, when it was ranked among the top 10 names for girls.

== Variations ==
Albanian: Anxhela/Angjela

Basque: Angelu

Belarusian: Anžela/Anzhela

Bosnian: Anđela

Czech: Anděla

English: Angela, Angie

French: Angèle

Greek: Angela

Hungarian: Angéla

Indonesian: Angela

Irish: Aingeal

Italian: Angella

Kyrgyz: Anjela

Maltese: Anġela

Portuguese: Ângela

Polish: Aniela, Angela/Andżela

Romanian: Angelei

Russian: Anzhela

Serbian: Anđela

Spanish: Ángela

Ukrainian: Anzhela

== People ==
- Angela (singer) (born 1991), Ukrainian singer and model
- Angela of Foligno (1248–1309), Franciscan, Catholic, saint
- Angela Aames (1956–1988), American B-movie actress
- Angelica Bäumer (1932–2025), Austrian art critic and art historian
- Ángela Acuña Braun (1888–1983), Costa Rican lawyer, writer and feminist
- Angela Adamoli (born 1972), former Italian basketball player
- Angela Adams (born 1965), American rug designer
- Angela Addison (born 1999), English association football player
- Angela P. Aggeler, American diplomat
- Angela Agostini, Italian botanist and mycologist
- Ángela Aguilar (born 2003), Mexican and American singer
- Angela Ahrendts (born 1960), American-British businesswoman
- Angela Doyinsola Aina, American public health practitioner
- Angela Ajodo (born 1972), Nigerian handball player
- Angela Aki (born 1977), Japanese singer and songwriter
- Angela Alarcon, Filipino actress
- Angela Alberti (born 1949), Italian gymnast
- Ángela Alessio Robles (1917–2004), Mexican civil engineer and town planner
- Angela Alioto (born 1949), American lawyer and politician
- Angela A. Allen-Bell, American activist scholar
- Ângela Almeida, Portuguese politician
- Angela Alorwu-Tay (born 1971), Ghanaian politician
- Angela Alsobrooks (born 1971), American politician and lawyer
- Angela Alupei (born 1972), Romanian rower
- Angela Alvarado (born 1972), American actress and director
- Ángela Álvarez (1927–2024), Cuban-born American singer
- Angela Amato Velez, American television writer and producer
- Angela Anderes (1919–?), Swiss figure skater
- Angela Anderson, German artist
- Angela Andreoli (born 2006), Italian artistic gymnast
- Angela Angel (born 1979), American politician
- Angela Annabell (1929–2000), New Zealand musicologist
- Angela Aquereburu (born 1977), Togolese film director
- Angela Arcangeli (born 1971), Italian basketball player
- Angela Arney, British novelist
- Angela Arsenault, American politician from Vermont
- Angela Asare (born 1985), Ghanaian beauty queen
- Angela Asher, Canadian film and television actress
- Angela Atede (born 1972), Nigerian hurdler
- Angela Atwood (1949–1974), American criminal
- Angela Au (born 1983), Hong Kong singer and DJ
- Ángela Auad (c. 1945–1977), Argentine social activist
- Angela Maria Autsch (1900–1944), German nun
- Angela Aycock (born 1973), American basketball player
- Angela Baca (1927–2014), Native American potter
- Ángela Bachiller (born 1983), Spanish politician
- Angela Baddeley (1904–1976), English actress
- Angela Bailey (1962–2021), Canadian sprinter
- Angela Bairstow (1942–2016), English badminton player
- Angela Ballara (1944–2021), New Zealand historian
- Ángela Abós Ballarín (1934–2022), Spanish writer and politician
- Angela Banks (footballer) (born 1975), English footballer
- Angela M. Banks, American lawyer and legal academic
- Angela Baraldi (born 1964), Italian actress and singer
- Angela Barker, Australian advocate for victims of domestic violence
- Angela Barnes (born 1976), English stand-up comedian
- Angela Barnwell (1936–1965), British swimmer
- Ángela Barón (born 2003), Colombian footballer
- Angela Baroni (born 1979), Italian sailor
- Angela Barrett, British artist and illustrator
- Angela Barry, Bermudian writer and educator
- Angela Barylla, German triple jumper
- Angela Bassett (born 1958), American actress
- Angela Batinovich, American businesswoman
- Angela Baumgartner (born 1969), Austrian politician
- Angela Beard (born 1997), Filipino footballer
- Ángela Becerra (born 1957), Colombian writer
- Angela Myles Beeching, arts career specialist
- Angela Behelle (born 1971), French novelist
- Angela Belcher, American biochemist
- Angela van Bengale, South African progenitrix
- Angela Bennett, Australian mining heiress
- Angela Benton (born 1981), American businesswoman
- Angela Berners-Wilson, Anglican woman priest
- Angela Berry-White (born 1968), American retired soccer player
- Angela Bettis (born 1973), American actress
- Angela Betzien, Australian playwright and screenwriter
- Angela Beyincé (born 1976), American songwriter, actress and music executive
- Angela Bianchini (1921–2018), Italian writer and literary critic
- Angela Billingham, Baroness Billingham (born 1939), British labour politician
- Angela Birch (born 1974), Fijian swimmer
- Angela Bishop (born 1967), Australian reporter and television presenter
- Angela McCormick Bisig (born 1964 or 1965), American judge
- Angela Bizzarri (born 1988), American distance runner
- Angela Black, American news anchor
- Angela Blanchard, American policy advisor and CEO
- Angela Glover Blackwell, American attorney, civil rights advocate and author
- Angela Bloomfield (born 1972), New Zealand actress
- Angela Bocage, American cartoonist
- Angela Bofill (1954–2024), American R&B singer
- Angela Bolster (1925–2005), Irish nun and writer
- Angela Bonallack (1937–2022), English amateur golfer
- Angela Bonavoglia, writer and journalist
- Ángela Bonilla (born 1991), Ecuadorian model and beauty pageant titleholder
- Angela Elizabeth Booth (1869–1954), Australian eugenicist
- Angela Borgia (c. 1486–c. 1521), Italian noblewoman
- Angela Borsuk (born 1967), Israeli chess player
- Angela Boškin (1885–1977), Slovenian nurse and social worker in Yugoslavia
- Angela Maria Bottari (1945–2023), Italian politician
- Angela Bourke, Irish writer
- Angela Bowen (1936–2018), American academic, writer and lesbian rights activist
- Angela Bowie (born 1949), first wife of David Bowie, often known as "Angie Bowie"
- Angela Boyd (born 1986), New Zealand lawn bowler
- Angela Bracco, Italian physicist
- Angela Bradburn-Spangler (born 1968), American high jumper
- Angela Brady, Irish/British architect
- Angela Braly (born 1961), American executive
- Angela Brand-Barker (born 1961), British runner
- Angela van den Brant, 17th-century business owner
- Angela Bray (born 1953), former British Member of Parliament
- Angela Brazil (1868–1947), British writer
- Angela Brennan (politician), American politician
- Angela Brennan (painter) (born 1960), Australian artist
- Angela Bridgeman, Scottish athlete
- Angela Christine Bridgland, Australian librarian
- Angela Brito (born 1985), Ecuadorian long-distance runner
- Angela Hartley Brodie (1934–2017), British pharmacologist and cancer researcher
- Angela N. Brooks, American biologist and geneticist
- Angela Brooks, American architect
- Angela Brower (born 1983), American operatic mezzo-soprano
- Angela Brown, multiple people
- Angela Browning (born 1946), British conservative politician
- Angela Bruce (born 1951), English actress
- Angela Brunner (1931–2011), German actress
- Angela Bryan, social psychologist
- Angela Bryant (born 1951), American politician
- Angela Warnick Buchdahl (born 1972), American rabbi
- Angela Bulloch, Canadian-born artist
- Angela Bundalovic (born 1995), Danish actress
- Angela Burdett-Coutts, 1st Baroness Burdett-Coutts (1814–1906), British peeress and philanthropist
- Angela Bürgis (born 1979), Swiss tennis player
- Angela Burns, British businesswoman and politician
- Angela Burt-Murray, American author, journalist and editor
- Angela Buthelezi (born 1969), South African politician
- Angela Buxton (1934–2020), English tennis player
- Angela Byars-Winston, professor of medicine
- Angela Byron, developer of Drupal software
- Angela Bys (born 1989), American volleyball player
- Angela Cadwell, U. S. Air Force general
- Angela Calabrese Barton (born 1968), American professor of teacher education
- Angela Calina, Filipino TV personality
- Angela Calomiris (1916–1995), American photographer
- Angela Camacho (born 1947), Colombian physicist
- Angela Cannings, British woman, wrongfully convicted of murder
- Angela Cappetta, American photographer
- Ángela Cárdenas (born 1993), Bolivian footballer
- Angela Cardoso, multiple people
- Angela Carini (born 1998), Italian boxer
- Angela Carlozzi Rossi (1901–1977), American social worker
- Angela Carluccio (born 1972), Italian politician
- Ángela Carrasco (born 1951), Dominican Republic singer
- Angela Carter (1940–1992), English novelist
- Angela Cartwright (born 1952), English-born American actress
- Angela Casini, medicinal and inorganic chemist
- Ángela Castro (born 1993), Bolivian race-walker
- Angela Catford (born 1978), Australian basketball player
- Angela Catterns (born 1953), Australian radio personality
- Angela Cavagna (born 1966), Italian singer
- Angela Cavalieri, Australian printmaker
- Angela Cazac (born 1971), Romanian rower
- Ángela Cervantes (born 1993), Spanish actress
- Angela Chalmers (born 1963), Canadian athlete
- Angela Chan Ka-yan, Hong Kong rugby union player
- Angela Chan (born 1967), American fashion designer
- Angela Chang (born 1982), Taiwanese pop singer
- Angela Chao (1973–2024), American businesswoman
- Angela Chau (died 2020), Hong Kong lawn bowler
- Angela Chen, Chinese businesswoman
- Angela Cheng (born 1959), Canadian pianist
- Angela Cheung, Canadian internal medicine specialist
- Angela Chow (born 1972), Taiwanese-Canadian actress and television host
- Angela Christ (born 1989), Dutch footballer
- Angela Christian, American actress and singer
- Angela Christiano, American dermatologist and geneticist
- Angela Chuck (born 1981), Jamaican swimmer
- Angela Clarke, multiple people
- Ángela Clavijo (born 1993), Colombian footballer
- Angela Clay, American politician and activist
- Angela Clayton (1959–2014), transgender rights activist and physicist
- Angela Cockerham (born 1976), American politician
- Angela Coco, Australian sociologist and academic
- Angela Codazzi (1890–1972), Italian geographer, cartographer
- Angela Colantonio, Canadian occupational scientist
- Angela Colley (born 1964), Gambian politician
- Angela Colmenero, American lawyer
- Angela Conner, English sculptor
- Angela Constance (born 1970), British politician
- Ángela Corao (born 2002), Spanish former rhythmic gymnast
- Angela Corey (born 1954), American attorney
- Angela Correa, American singer-songwriter
- Angela Correll, American author
- Angela Cortiñas, American bishop
- Angela Coughlan (1952–2009), Canadian swimmer
- Angela Crawley (born 1987), Scottish politician
- Angela N. H. Creager (born 1963), American biochemist and historian of science
- Angela Creamer (born 1956), British middle-distance runner
- Ángela Cremonte (born 1985), Spanish-Argentine actress
- Angela Crow (1935–2022), British television actor
- Angela Cullen (born 1974), New Zealand physiotherapist and former field hockey player
- Angela Curran, English actress
- Angela Cutrone (born 1969), Canadian short-track speed tracker
- Angela Daigle (born 1976), American sprinter
- Angela Dale (born 1945) British statistician
- Angela Dalle Vacche, American academic
- Angela Dalton, New Zealand politician
- Angela Danadjieva (born 1931), Bulgarian-American landscape architect
- Ángela Dávila (1944–2003), Guatemalan footballer
- Angela Davis, multiple people
- Angela Dawson, multiple people
- Angela Day (born 1952), Canadian chess player
- Angela Dean (trustee), British banker and trustee
- Angela Dean, British statistician
- Angela Delevingne (1912–2014), British socialite
- Angela DeMontigny, Indigenous Canadian fashion designer
- Angela Denoke (born 1961), German opera singer
- Angela Derochie (born 1973), Canadian figure skater
- Angela Desveaux, Canadian singer-songwriter
- Angela Deuber (born 1975), German architect
- Ángela Díaz (born 1999), Puerto Rican footballer
- Angela Diaz, medical practitioner and academic
- Angela Diederichsen (born 1950), German judge
- Angela D. Dillard, American scholar and author
- Angela Diller (1877–1968), American pianist and music educator
- Angela Dimayuga, American chef
- Angela Dimitriou (born 1954), Greek singer
- Ângela Diniz (1944–1976), Brazilian socialite
- Angela Dohrmann (born 1965), American actress and television personality
- Angela Dominguez, American children's book author and illustrator
- Angela Donald (born 1995), Australian artistic gymnast
- Angela Dorn-Rancke (born 1982), German politician
- Angela Dotchin (born 1974), New Zealand actress
- Angela Douglas, multiple people
- Angela Down (born 1946), English actress
- Angela Downey, Irish camogie player
- Angela Mary Doyle (born 1925), Australian nun and hospital administrator
- Angela von den Driesch (1934–2012), German archaeologist and veterinarian
- Angela Ducey (born 1965), American businesswoman and philanthropist
- Angela Duckworth, American psychologist
- Angela Dudley, South African laser scientist
- Angela Dufresne, American painter
- Angela Dugalić (born 2001), Serbian-American basketball player
- Angela Dwamena-Aboagye, Ghanaian lawyer and gender activist
- Angela Dwyer, Australian social scientist and writer
- Angela Eagle (born 1961), British politician
- Angela East, British cellist
- Angela M. Eaves (born 1959), American judge
- Angela Eiter (born 1986), Austrian professional climber
- Angela Ekaette (born 1959), Nigerian ballet dancer
- Angela Elis (born 1966), German television presenter, journalist, book author and coach
- Angela Ellsworth, American artist
- Angela Emuwa, Nigerian media executive and journalist
- Angela Care Evans, British archaeologist
- Angela Farmer, teacher of modern yoga
- Angela Farrell (sailor) (born 1981), Australian sailor
- Angela Farrell, Irish singer
- Angela Faustina, American painter
- Angela Featherstone (born 1965), Canadian actress
- Angela Feeney (born 1954), Irish opera singer
- Ângela Ferreira, Portuguese and South African artist
- Angela Ferrell-Zabala, American activist
- Ángela Figueroa (born 1984), Colombian athlete
- Angela Fimmano (born 1992), Australian football player
- Angela Finger-Erben (born 1980), German TV presenter and journalist
- Angela Finocchiaro (born 1955), Italian actress
- Ángela Fita Boluda (born 1999), Spanish tennis player
- Angela Fitzgerald, American educator and television presenter
- Angela Flanders (1927–2016), British perfumer
- Angela Flournoy, American writer
- Angela Flowers (1932–2023), British gallerist
- Angela Fong (born 1985), Canadian professional wrestler and model
- Angela Foulkes, New Zealand trade unionist and government official
- Angela Fraleigh (born 1976), American artist
- Angela Franke (born 1957), German swimmer
- Angela Frautschi (born 1987), Swiss ice hockey player
- Angela Freiberger, Brazilian artist
- Angela D. Friederici (born 1952), German cognitive scientist
- Angela Funovits (born 1987), American magician, mentalist and physician
- Angela Fusco, Canadian actress
- Angela Galea (born 1983), Maltese swimmer
- Angela Gallop (born 1950), British forensic scientist
- Angela Galuppo (born 1983), Canadian film, TV and voice actress
- Angela Garbes, American writer
- Ángela García, multiple people
- Angela Gegg (born 1979), Belizean artist
- Angela Gehann-Dernbach (born 1958), German conductor, organist and singer
- Angela Gentzmer (1929–2024), German author and songwriter
- Angela Gerekou (born 1959), Greek politician and actress
- Angela Ghayour, Afghan educator and advocate
- Angela Gheorghiu (born 1965), Romanian opera diva
- Angela E. Gibbs, American actress
- Angela Gibson (born 1949), American politician from Maryland
- Angela Gillespie (1824–1887), American religious sister
- Angela Ginovska (born 1993), Macedonian footballer
- Angela Giron (born 1960), American politician
- Angela Glynne (1933–2008), British actress
- Angela Godfrey (born 1939), English sculptor
- Angela Goethals (born 1977), American former actress
- Angela Golden Bryan, Caribbean-American actress and writer
- Angela Golz (born 1969), German gymnast
- Angela Gomes (born 1952), Bangladeshi social worker
- Ángela Gómez (born 1988), Spanish actress, model, painter and beauty pageant titleholder
- Angela Maria Diniz Gonçalves (born 1949), known by the stage name Angela Ro Ro, Brazilian singer
- Angela Goodall (born 1961), British archer
- Angela Goodwin (1925–2016), Italian actress
- Angela Gossow (born 1974), German death metal singer
- Angela Gotelli (1905–1996), Italian politician
- Angela Gots, American actress
- Angela Grant, British actress
- Ángela Grassi (1826–1883), Spanish writer
- Angela Grauerholz (born 1952), German-born Canadian photographer, graphic designer and educator
- Angela Greene (1921–1978), Irish actress
- Angela Gregory (1903–1990), American sculptor
- Angela Gregovic (born 1978), Serbian actress
- Angela Griffin (born 1976), British actress and television presenter
- Angela Grippo, American neuroscientist and health psychologist
- Angela Grisar (born 1973), Chilean racquetball player
- Angela Groothuizen (born 1959), Dutch pop singer
- Angela Grossmann (born 1955), Canadian artist
- Ângela Guadagnin (born 1948), Brazilian politician and physician
- Angela Maria Guidi Cingolani (1896–1991), Italian politician
- Angela Gurnell, British geoscientist
- Ángela Gurría (1929–2023), Mexican sculptor
- Angela Guzman, American graphic designer
- Angela Haggerty, Scottish writer and journalist
- Angela Hall (born 1958), New Zealand footballer
- Angela Hamblin (born 1976), American basketball player
- Angela Hutchinson Hammer (1870–1952), American newspaperwoman
- Angela Hampel (born 1956), German painter, graphic artist and installation artist
- Angela Hannah (born 1986), British canoeist
- Angela Kim Harkins (born 1973), Korean-American academic
- Angela Harkness, American fraudster
- Angela Harris, multiple people
- Angela Harrison, British greyhound racing professional trainer
- Angela Harry (born 1963), American actress
- Angela Hartnett (born 1968), English chef
- Angela Hauck (born 1965), German speed skater
- Angela Hawken (born 1971), South African academic
- Angela Haynes (born 1984), American tennis player
- Angela Hazeldine (born 1981), Welsh actress and musician
- Angela Hennessy, American artist and educator
- Ángela Hernández Álvarez (1990–2022), Colombian lawyer, journalist and politician
- Ángela Hernández Cajo, Peruvian lawyer and politician
- Angela Hernández Nuñez (born 1954), Dominican writer
- Angela Herron (born 1961), American rower
- Angela Hewitt (born 1958), Canadian classical pianist
- Angela Heywood (1840–1935), American writer and activist
- Angela Burks Hill (born 1965), American politician
- Angela Hill (born 1985), American mixed martial artist
- Angela Hill (journalist) (born 1949), American journalist
- Angela Hitler (1883–1949), half-sister of Adolf Hitler
- Angela Hohmann (born 1963), German politician
- Angela Holmes (1950–2000), British fashion designer
- Angela Hucles (born 1978), American soccer player and sports executive
- Angela Hughes (c. 1806–1866), Irish-American nun
- Angela Elwell Hunt (born 1957), American novelist
- Angela Hunter (born 1972), British cyclist
- Angela Hur, American writer
- Angela Huth (born 1938), English novelist and journalist
- Angela Iacobellis (1948–1961), Italian Servant of God
- Angela Ianaro (born 1967), Italian politician
- Angela Iannotta (born 1971), Italian-Australian soccer player and coach
- Angela Jackson, multiple people
- Angela Jacobs (1969–2022), American television journalist
- Angela Jager (born 1984), Dutch art historian and curator
- Angela James (born 1964), Canadian ice hockey player
- Angela Jankulovska (born 2002), Macedonian female handballer
- Angela Jansen, American artist
- Angela Jerabek, educational leader
- Ángela Jeria (1926–2020), Chilean mother of President Michelle Bachelet
- Angela de Jesus, South African artist
- Ángela Jiménez, soldadera of Mexican revolution
- Angela V. John, Welsh historian and biographer
- Angela Johnson, multiple people
- Angela Jones (born 1968), American actress
- Angela de Jong (born 1976), Dutch journalist, television critic and columnist
- Angela Josephine (born 1967), American indie folk singer-songwriter, musician, author and visual artist
- Angela Jursitzka (born 1938), Austrian journalist and writer
- Angela Kais (born 1980), Malaysian footballer
- Angela Kalule (born 1977), Ugandan musician and radio presenter
- Angela Kane (born 1948), German diplomat
- Angela Kang (born 1976)
- Angela Karp, agricultural scientist
- Angela Kashuba, American pharmacologist
- Angela Keep, Australian actress
- Angela Kelly (born 1971), Canadian soccer player and coach
- Angela Kelly (born 1957), British fashion designer and Personal Assistant to Queen Elizabeth II
- Angela Ken (born 2002), Filipino singer-songwriter, occasional actress, dancer and influencer
- Angela Kennedy (born 1976), Australian swimmer
- Angela Kepler, New Zealand naturalist and author
- Angela Kerek (born 1972), German tennis player
- Angela Kerins, Irish businesswoman
- Angela Jurdak Khoury (1915–2011), Lebanese diplomat
- Angela Jia Kim, American classical pianist
- Angela Kincaid, British illustrator
- Angela King, multiple people
- Angela Kinsey (born 1971), American actress
- Angela Kirby (born 1932), English writer
- Angela Knight (born 1950), British politician and official
- Angela Knight (author), American author of mostly erotic fantasy
- Angela Knösel (born 1949), German luger
- Angela Koehler, American biochemist
- Angela Kokkola (1932–2017), Greek politician
- Angela Kordež (1926–?), Yugoslav cross-country skier
- Angela Kovács (born 1964), Swedish actress
- Angela Krislinzki (born 1989), Indo-Polish actress and model
- Angela Kulikov (born 1998), American tennis player
- Angela Kunoth, German mathematician
- Angela Kwok, Welsh community activist
- Angela Kyerematen-Jimoh, Ghanaian business leader
- Angela Kyriakou (born 1977), Cypriot football referee
- Ángela Labordeta (born 1967), Spanish writer and journalist
- Ângela Lago (1945–2017), Brazilian children's writer and illustrator
- Angela Laich (born 1963), German artist
- Angela Atim Lakor, Ugandan activist
- AJ Lambert (born 1974), American singer
- Angela Lambert (1940–2007), British journalist, art critic and author
- Angela Lampe, German art historian and curator
- Angela Lanfranchi (born 1950), American surgeon and political activist
- Angela Lansbury (1925–2022), British-American actress and singer
- Angela Lanza, American singer, known most for touring overseas for U.S. troops
- Angela Lascelles (1919–2007), British actress
- Angela Lawson (born 1966), American basketball player and coach
- Angela Lee (born 1996), Canadian American martial artist
- Angela Leigh (died 2004), Ugandan ballet dancer
- Angela Leighton (born 1954), British literary scholar and poet
- Angela Lemaire, Scottish artist and printmaker
- Angela Lettiere (born 1972), American tennis player
- Angela Lewis (born 1988), American actress and philanthropist
- Angela Lichty (born 1979), Canadian softball player
- Angela Lien (born 1981), American figure skater
- Angela Lindvall (born 1979), American supermodel
- Angela Litschev (born 1978), Bulgarian-German writer and poet
- Angela Little, multiple people
- Angela Littlewood (born 1949), English shot putter
- Ángela Loij (c. 1900–1974), last surviving individual of full-blooded Selkʼnam descent
- Angela Lonsdale (born 1967), British actress
- Angela López (born 1955), Puerto Rican swimmer
- Angela Lorenz, American book artist
- Angela Luce (1937/38–2026), Italian actress
- Angela Lutz, Swiss female curler
- Angela Madsen (1960–2020), American Paralympic athlete
- Angela Maffeis (born 1996), Italian cyclist
- Angela Magaña (born 1983), American mixed martial artist
- Angela Makholwa, South African author
- Angela Malestein (born 1993), Dutch handball player
- Angela Manalang-Gloria (1907–1995), Filipina writer
- Angela Mao (born 1950), Taiwanese actress and martial artist
- Angela Maraventano (born 1964), Italian politician
- Angela Maria (1929–2018), Brazilian singer and actress
- Angela Marina (born 1999), Canadian Paralympic swimmer
- Angela Marinescu (1940–2023), Romanian poet
- Angela Marino (born 1986), New Zealand professional basketball player for the Adelaide Lightning (WNBL)
- Angela Mariotto, statistician
- Angela Marsons, British crime fiction author
- Angie Martinez (born 1971), American radio host and rapper
- Angela M. Martinez (born 1972), American judge
- Angela Martini (born 1986), Albanian-Swiss model and beauty pageant titleholder
- Angela Masi (born 1987), Italian politician
- Angela Mason (born 1944), British civil servant and activist
- Angela Masson, American aviator and artist
- Angela Maurer (born 1975), German long-distance swimmer
- Angela du Maurier (1904–2002), British actress and novelist
- Angela Maxwell (born 1992), American figure skater
- Angela Mazzarelli, American lawyer
- Angela McArdle (born 1983), 22nd Chair of the Libertarian National Committee
- Angela McCarthy, New Zealand history academic
- Angela McCluskey (1960–2024), British singer and songwriter
- Angela McCormack (born 1996 or 1997), Australian journalist and radio presenter, known professionally as Ange McCormack
- Angela McEwan (1934–2015), American actress
- Angela McGinnis (born 1986), American volleyball player
- Angela McGlowan (born 1970), American Republican political commentator, author, and consulting firm CEO
- Angela McGowan, Australian archaeologist
- Angela McGregor, New Zealand rugby player
- Angela Punch McGregor (born 1953), Australian actress
- Angela McHale (born 1969), English actress
- Angela McKee (born 1974), New Zealand high jumper
- Angela V. McKnight (born 1977), member of the New Jersey General Assembly
- Angela McLean (biologist) (born 1961), British professor of Mathematical Biology
- Angela McLean (born 1970), 35th Lieutenant Governor of Montana
- Angela McRobbie (born 1951), British academic
- Angela Meade (born 1977), opera singer
- Angela Means, American comedian, model and actress
- Angela Meder, German zoologist
- Angela Melillo (born 1967), Italian actress
- Angela Melini (born 1969), Playboy Playmate for June 1992
- Angela Menardi (born 1964), Italian wheelchair curler and cross-country skier
- Angela Merici (1474–1540), Italian Catholic saint
- Angela Merkel (born 1954), German research scientist, Chancellor of Germany from 2005 to 2021
- Angela Metzger, German-born concert organist
- Ángela Meyer (born 1947), Puerto Rican actress, comedian and producer of television and theatrical works
- Angela Migliazza (born 1984), German footballer
- Angela Mihai, British applied mathematician
- Angela Miller (born 1970), American volleyball player
- Angela Milner (1947–2021), British paleontologist
- Angela Minervini, Italian actress
- Angela Miri (born 1959), Nigerian academic
- Angela Misri, Canadian novelist
- Angela Missoni, Italian fashion businesswoman
- Angela Mitchell (born 1977), New Zealand netball player
- Angela Moldovan (1927–2013), Romanian singer
- Ángela Molina (born 1955), Spanish actress
- Angela Monson (born 1955), American politician
- Angela Moore (born 1972), American politician from Georgia
- Ângela Moraes (born 1972), Brazilian volleyball player
- Angela Morales (born 1966), American essayist, writer and educator
- Angela Morant (born 1941), British actress
- Angela Morgan (c. 1875–1957), American poet
- Angela Morley (1924–2009), English composer and conductor
- Angela Moroșanu (born 1986), Romanian athlete
- Angela Mortimer (1932–2025), English tennis player
- Angela Mosley, American politician
- Angela Mudge (born 1970), Scottish champion hill runner and skyrunner
- Angela Mullens (born 1968), Australian swimmer
- Angela Murdaugh (born 1940), American nurse
- Angela Murnane (born 1983), Australian cricketer
- Angela Murray Gibson (1878–1953), American film director
- Angela Musiimenta, Ugandan scientist
- Angela Naeth (born 1982), Canadian-American triathlete and gravel cyclist
- Angela Nagle (born 1984), Irish writer and academic
- Angela Nanetti (born 1942), Italian writer
- Angela Narth, Canadian writer
- Angela Nazar (born 1993), Indonesian singer and actress
- Angela Ndambuki (born 1980), Kenyan lawyer and corporate executive
- Angela Neal-Barnett, American child psychologist
- Angéla Németh (1946–2014), Hungarian javelin thrower
- Angela von Neumann (1928–2010), American artist
- Angela Nikodinov (born 1980), American figure skater
- Angela Nikolau (born 1993), Russian rooftopper
- Angela Nissel (born 1978), American author and television writer
- Angela Nogarola, Italian poet and writer
- Angela von Nowakonski (1953–2020), Brazilian physician
- Angela O'Donnell, American psychologist
- Angela O'Leary, 19th-20th century Rhode Island painter
- Angela E. Oh (born 1955), American attorney, writer and activist
- Angela Okolo, Nigerian physician
- Angela Okorie (born 1985), Nigerian actress
- Angela Olinto (born 1961), American astroparticle physicist and professor
- Angela Onwuachi-Willig, American legal scholar
- Angela Orebaugh, American computer scientist and author
- Angela Orosz (born 1944), Hungarian holocaust survivor
- Angela Pagano (1937–2024), Italian actress
- Angela Palacious, (born 1953), Bahamian Christian minister
- Angela Palmer, Scottish artist and former journalist
- Angela Pan (born 1949), Hong Kong actress in films and soap operas
- Angela Park (born 1988), Brazilian-American professional golfer
- Angela Paton (1930–2016), American actress
- Angela Patton, activist and creator of Camp Diva
- Angela Paxton (born 1963), American politician
- Angela Peñaherrera (born 1985), Ecuadorian actress
- Angela Perez, Filipino actress
- Angela Perez Baraquio (born 1976), American beauty queen
- Angela Perez Flores, Guamanian First Lady of Guam
- Anxhela Peristeri (born 1986), Albanian singer
- Angela L. Perun (1921–2007), American politician
- Angela Pery (1897–1981), British leader of the Red Cross
- Angela Phillips, British journalist and academic
- Angela Phipps (born 1964), Canadian sprinter
- Angela Piggford (born 1963), English sprinter
- Ângela Pinto (1869–1925), Portuguese stage actor
- Angela Piper, English actress
- Angela Pippos (born 1969), Australian journalist
- Angela Piskernik (1886–1967), Austrian-Yugoslav botanist and conservationist
- Angela Pitt (born 1981), Canadian provincial politician from Alberta
- Angela Platt (born 1979), British women's hockey and football goalkeeper, sports administrator
- Angela Pleasence (1941–2026), British actress
- Ángela Ponce (born 1991), Spanish model
- Angela Pope, British director
- Angela C. Popp (born 1968), American film director
- Angela Poppy (born 1953), English footballer
- Angela Portaluri (born 1937), Italian actress
- Ângela Portela (born 1962), Brazilian politician
- Angela Postma (born 1971), Dutch freestyle swimmer
- Angela Povilaitis, former assistant attorney general of Michigan
- Angela Haseltine Pozzi, American sculptor
- Angela Predhomme (born 1967), American singer-songwriter and music producer
- Angela Pressey (born 1986), American volleyball player
- Angela Procida (born 2000), Italian Paralympic swimmer
- Ángela Pumariega (born 1984), Spanish yacht racer
- Angela Quarles, American novelist
- Angela T. Quigless (born 1960), American Missouri Court of Appeals judge
- Ángela Ragno (1931–2024), Argentine actress
- Angela Raiola (1960–2016), American reality television personality
- Angela Ralli, Greek linguist, morphologist and dialectologist
- Angela Ramello (1944–2004), Italian middle-distance runner
- Angela Ranft (born 1969), German cyclist
- Angela Rasmussen, American virologist and researcher
- Angela Rawlings (born 1978), Canadian writer and poet
- Angela Rayner (born 1980), British politician
- Angela Readman (born 1973), British poet and short story writer
- Angela Reakes (born 1990), Australian cricketer
- Angela J. Reddock, American lawyer
- Angela Redgrave (1917–2024), British dance teacher
- Angela Redish, Canadian professor of economics
- Angela Restrepo Moreno (1931–2022), Colombian scientist
- Angela Reynolds, British stage and television actress
- Ângela Mendonça Ribeiro (born 1962), Brazilian diver
- Angela Richards (born 1944), British actress and singer
- Angela Richardson (born 1974), British politician
- Angela Richter, German-Croatian theatre director and author
- Angela Ridgeon, British actress
- Angela Rigas, American politician
- Angela R. Riley, American jurist
- Angela Rinicella (born 1982), Italian long-distance runner
- Angela Rippon (born 1944), English television journalist, newsreader, writer and presenter
- Angela M. Rivers (born 1953), African-American artist and curator
- Angela Ro Ro (1949–2025), Brazilian singer-songwriter
- Angela Roberts (scientist), British neurobiologist
- Angela Roberts (politician), New Zealand Labour Party politician
- Angela Roberts (curler) (1968–2024), Canadian curler
- Angela Robinson, multiple people
- Ángela Robledo (born 1953), Colombian psychologist and politician
- Angela Rock (born 1963), American volleyball athlete and coach
- Angela Rockwood (born 1975), American actress
- Angela Rodel, American-born literary translator
- Ángela Rodríguez (born 1989), Spanish philosopher and politician
- Angela Romei (born 1997), Italian curler
- Angela Romero, American politician
- Angela Rose (born 1978), American activist
- Angela Rosenthal (1963–2010), American art historian
- Angela de' Rossi (c. 1506–1573), Italian noblewoman
- Angela Roy (born 1957), American actress
- Angela Ruch (born 1983), American racing driver
- Angela Rudzka (born 1984), German politician
- Angela Ruggiero (born 1980), American women's ice hockey player
- Ángela Ruiz (born 2006), Mexican archer
- Ángela Ruiz Robles (1895–1975), Spanish teacher and inventor
- Angela Ruiz (born 1992), Venezuelan pageant titleholder
- Angela Rumbold (1932–2010), former British Member of Parliament
- Angela Russell, multiple people
- Angela Russo-Otstot, American screenwriter and producer
- Angela Rye (born 1979), American podcaster
- Angela Rypien (born 1990), American football player
- Angela Saini (born 1980), British journalist
- Angela Salawa (1881–1922), Polish charity worker and Franciscan tertiary, beatified by the Catholic Church
- Ángela Salazar (1954–2020), Colombian activist
- Angela Salem (born 1988), American soccer coach and former player
- Angela Salinas (born 1953), U. S. Marine Corps general
- Angela Salloker (1913–2006), Austrian actress
- Ángela Salvadores (born 1997), Spanish basketball player
- Angela Salvagno (born 1976), American bodybuilder and adult model
- Ángela San Juan (born 1983), Spanish swimmer
- Angela Santomero (born 1968), American television producer, who is known for creating children's series such as Nick Jr.'s Blue's Clues
- Angela Sarafyan (born 1983), Armenian-American actress
- Angela Sârbu (born 1974), Moldovan journalist
- Angela Sasse, computer scientist and information security expert
- Angela Saunders, English model and actress
- Angela Savage (born 1966), Australian author
- Angela Scanlon (born 1983), Irish television presenter
- Angela Schanelec (born 1962), German actress
- Angela Schijf (born 1979), Dutch actress
- Angela Schmidt-Foster (born 1960), Canadian cross-country skier
- Angela Schneider (born 1959), Canadian rower
- Angela Schoellig, German computer scientist
- Angela Scoular (1945–2011), English actress
- Angela Seeney, British energy engineer
- Ángela Segovia, Spanish poet and researcher
- Angela Seo, South Korean musician and member of Xiu Xiu born Hyunhye
- Angela Shelton (born 1972), American actress and producer
- Angela V. Shelton (born 1970), American actress and comedian
- Angela Sidney (1902–1991), Tagish storyteller
- Angela Similea (born 1946), Romanian singer
- Angela Simmonds (born 1975), Canadian politician
- Angela Sinclair-Loutit (1921–2016), English social justice activist
- Angela Singer (born 1966), New Zealand artist and animal rights activist
- Angela Slatter, Australian writer
- Angela Slavova, Bulgarian applied mathematician
- Angela Smith, multiple people
- Angéla Smuczer (born 1982), Hungarian footballer
- Angela Sommer-Bodenburg (born 1948), German author of fantasy books for children
- Angela Sorby (born 1965), American poet
- Ángela Sosa (born 1993), Spanish footballer
- Angela Spalsbury (born 1967), American mathematician
- Angela Speck, English professor of astrophysics
- Angela Spivey (born 1959), American gospel musician and artist
- Angela Stachowa (1948–2022), German Sorbian writer and politician
- Angela Stanford (born 1977), American professional golfer
- Angela Stanton-King (born 1977), American media personality and politician
- Angela Steenbakkers (born 1994), Dutch handballer
- Angela Steinbach (born 1955), German former swimmer
- Angela Steinmüller (born 1941), German mathematician and science fiction author
- Angela Stent, British-American foreign policy academic
- Angela Sterritt, Canadian journalist
- Angela Stevens (1925–2016), American actress and singer
- Angela Stiens, American politician
- Angela Strank (born 1952), chief scientist at BP
- Angela Strassheim, American photographer
- Angela Strehli (born 1945), American blues singer-songwriter
- Angela Stribling (1967–2026), American host and singer
- Angela Stroud, 21st-century American politician
- Angela Su, Hong Kong artist
- Angela Sun (born 1979), American journalist
- Angela Sykes (1911–1984), countess of Antrim, sculptor, cartoonist and illustrator
- Angela Tamagnini (1770–1827), vaccination pioneer and heroine of the Peninsular War in Portugal
- Angela Tanoesoedibjo (born 1987), Indonesian businessperson and politician Vice Minister of Tourism and Creative Economy from 2019 to 2024
- Angela Tanui (born 1992), Kenyan athlete
- Angela Tanuzi (born 2002), Albanian model and beauty queen
- Angela Taylor, multiple people
- Ángela Téllez-Girón (1925–2015), Spanish noblewoman
- Ángela Tenorio (born 1996), Ecuadorian sprinter
- Angela Tessinari, American television director
- Angela Thacker (born 1964), American long jumper
- Angela Thirkell (1890–1961), British-Australian novelist
- Angela Thomas, British pediatric hematologist
- Angela Thompson (1896–1954), British Girl Guide executive
- Angela Thorne (1939–2023), English actress
- Angela Tiatia (born 1973), New Zealand-Australian artist of Samoan heritage
- Angela Tilby (born 1950), Anglican priest and theologian
- Angela Tincher O'Brien (born 1985), American softball player
- Angela Toler, former unidentified decedent from North Carolina
- Angela Tong (born 1975), Hong Kong actress
- Angela Tooby (born 1960), British former long-distance runner
- Angela Topping (born 1954), English poet and critic
- Ángela González Tort (1879–1946), Cuban guerrilla
- Angela Tosheva (born 1961), Bulgarian musician
- Angela Trimbur (born 1981), American actress
- Angela Trindade (1909–1980), American painter
- Angela Truszkowska (1825–1898), Polish religious sister
- Angela Tsun (born 1982), Australian presenter
- Angela Tucker, American writer, director and producer
- Angela Tuckett, English first female solicitor
- Angela Turner-Ford (born 1971), American politician
- Angela Tuvaeva (born 1985), Russian curler
- Angela Uzielli (1940–1999), English amateur golfer
- Angela Valamanesh, Australian artist
- Ángela Valle (1927–2003), writer, journalist, essayist
- Ángela Vallvey (born 1964), Spanish writer
- Angela Vautour (born 1960), Canadian politician
- Angela Venturini (born 1964), Dutch cricketer
- Ángela Romera Vera (1912–1990), Argentine legal scholar
- Angela Veronese (1778–1847), Italian poet
- Angela Verren (1930–2023), British artist
- Angela Via (born 1981), American singer
- Angela Viciosa (born 2002), Spanish athlete
- Ângela Viegas Santiago, São Toméan politician
- Ângela Vieira (born 1952), Brazilian actress
- Angela Vincent, British neurosurgeon
- Angela Vint, Canadian actress
- Angela Violi, Italian-American combustion engineer
- Angela Visser (born 1966), Dutch actress, model and beauty queen
- Angela Vithoulkas (born 1966), Australian politician and businesswoman
- Angela Voglia, Italian opera singer
- Angela Voigt (1951–2013), East German long jumper
- Angela Wakefield (born 1978), British fine artist
- Angela Walker, multiple people
- Angela Walsh, Irish Gaelic footballer
- Angela Wang (born 1996), American ladies' figure skater
- Angela Wanhalla, New Zealand professor of history
- Angela Washko, American artist
- Angela Watkinson (born 1941), British politician
- Angela Webber (1955–2007), Australian comedian
- Angela Webster, clinical epidemiologist
- Angela White, multiple people
- Angela Williams, multiple people
- Angela K. Wilson, American chemist
- Angela Winbush (born 1955), American singer
- Angela Winkler (born 1944), German actress
- Angela Winstanley-Smith (born 1985), British water polo player and coach
- Angela Witwer, American politician
- Angela Woollacott, Australian historian
- Angela Wozniak (born 1987), American politician
- Angela Wright-Scott (born 1961), American hurdler
- Angela Y. Wu, American computer scientist
- Angela Yang, Chinese-American librarian
- Angela Yee (born 1976), American radio personality
- Angela Yeo (born 1984), American professional bodybuilder
- Angela Yeung (born 1989), Hong Kong Chinese model and actress, known professionally as Angelababy
- Angela Yu Chien (1942–2000), Hong Kong actress
- Angela Yu (born 2003), Australian badminton player
- Angela Yuen (born 1993), Hong Kong model and actress
- Angela Zachepa, Malawian accountant and politician
- Ángela Zago, Venezuelan journalist, writer and former guerrilla fighter
- Angela Zhang (scientist), American scientist and student
- Angela Zhang (born 1982), Taiwanese singer and actress
- Angela Zhou, New Zealand actress
- Angela Zigahl (1885–1955), German teacher and politician
- Angela Zito, American anthropologist and historian
- Angela Zuckerman (born 1965), American speed skater

=== Fictional characters ===
- Talking Angela, a female anthropomorphic white cat character featured in Outfit7 apps Talking Angela and My Talking Angela
- Angela, a character from the adult animated series "Family Guy"
- Angela (character), a character from Image Comics and Marvel Comics
- Angela (Inheritance), a character in the Inheritance Cycle novels
- Angela Channing, a wine matriarch character from the television series Falcon Crest
- Angela Chase, a character from the 1990s television series, My So-Called Life, played by Claire Danes
- Angela Cross, a character from the 2003 video game Ratchet & Clank: Going Commando.
- Angela Harris, a character from the British soap opera Coronation Street
- Angela Martin, accountant from the US television series The Office, played by Angela Kinsey
- Angela Montenegro, character from the FOX drama Bones
- Angela Moss, a character from the thriller television series Mr. Robot, portrayed by Portia Doubleday
- Angela Orosco, a character from the Silent Hill video game series
- Angela Smith, a character from the children's animated supernatural television series Mona the Vampire
- Angela Weber, a character from the book and film series The Twilight Saga
- Angela Ziegler, a support-class character from the video game Overwatch
- Angela Prophet the protagonist of the Video game Psychotoxic
- Angela, an AI from Lobotomy Corporation and its sequel Library of Ruina
- Angela Main Character from the irish animated film Angela's Christmas
- Sheriff Angela Carter from the slasher film Wrong Turn 4

== See also ==
- Angela (disambiguation)
- Angie (disambiguation)
- Anđela (given name), South Slavic version of Angela
