= Jeřábek =

Jeřábek (feminine: Jeřábková) is a Czech surname. In Czech, it means 'hazel grouse', but it is also a diminutive form of jeřáb (meaning 'crane'). It was originally used as a nickname for a tall person. Notable people with the surname include:

- Angela Jerabek, American educator and author
- Antonín Jeřábek (born 1982), Czech ice hockey referee
- Dita Jeřábková (born 1974), Czech volleyball player
- Jakub Jeřábek (born 1991), Czech ice hockey player
- Jarmila Jeřábková (1912–1989), Czech dancer, choreographer and teacher
- Markéta Jeřábková (born 1996), Czech handballer
- Michal Jeřábek (born 1993), Czech footballer
- Rostislav Jeřábek (born 1962), Czech footballer
- Tomáš Jeřábek (born 1973), Czech sport shooter
- Václav Jeřábek (1845–1931), Czech mathematician
