= Bridgland =

Bridgland may refer to:

- Mount Bridgland in Jasper National Park in Alberta, Canada

== People with the name Bridgland ==
- Angela Christine Bridgland (born 1952), Australian library educator
- Fred Bridgland, British writer and biographer
- Georges Bridgland (1915–1997), French jockey
- John A. Bridgland (1826–18900, American diplomat, military officer, and businessperson
- Walter Lewis Bridgland (1908–1987), South Australian businessman
- William Bridgland Steer (1867–1939), British trade unionist and politician
