= Ángela García =

Ángela García may refer to:

- Angela Garcia (anthropologist) (born 1971), American anthropologist and ethnographer
- Angela Garcia Combs (born 1962), American writer and director
- Ángela García de Paredes (born 1958), Spanish architect
- Ángela García Rives (fl. 1891–1961), Spanish librarian
