= Angela Aquereburu =

Togolese film director

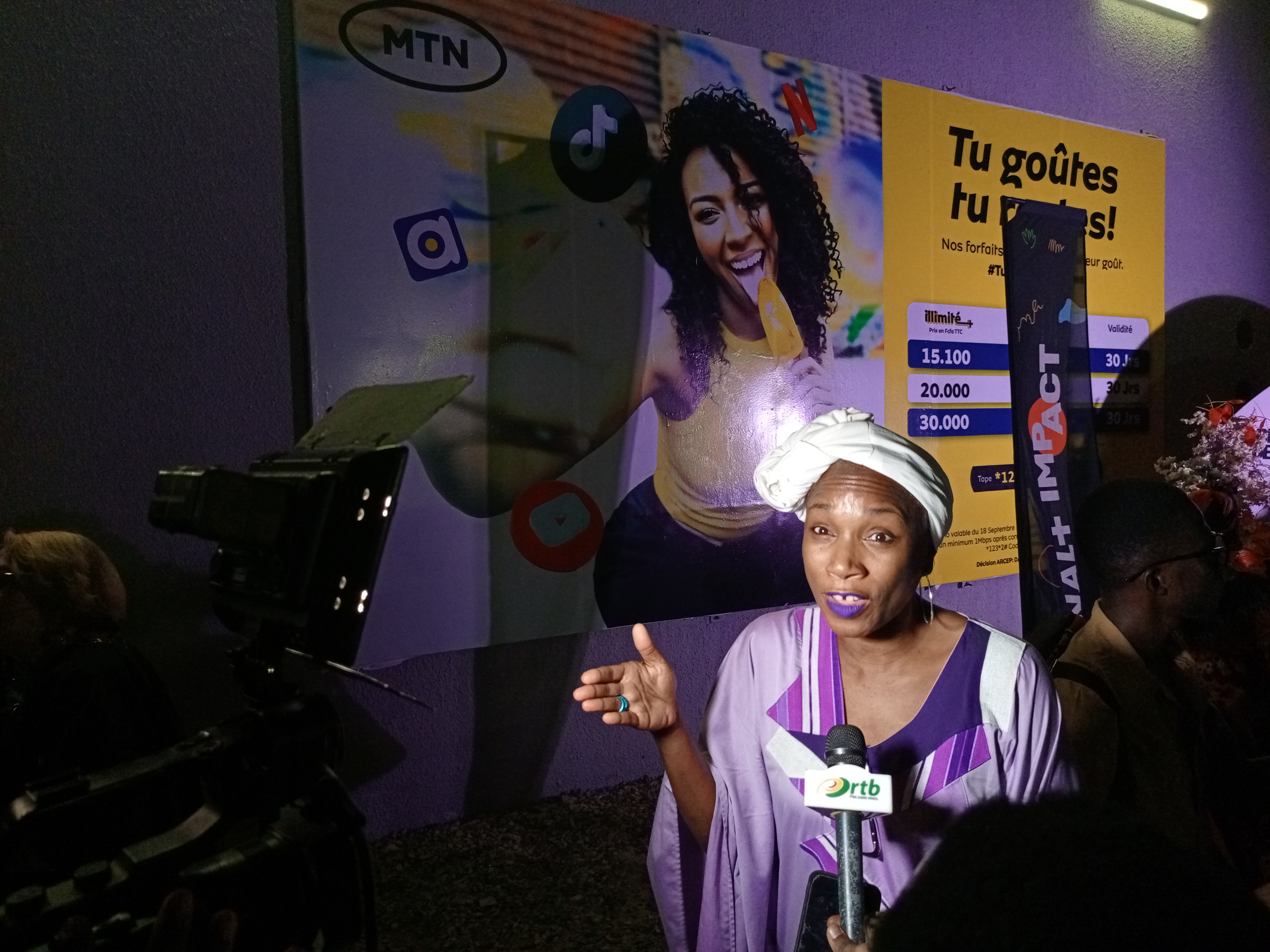
- Born: January 11, 1977 (age 48); Togo
- Education: ESCP Business School
- Occupation(s): Screenwriter, film producer, film director, TV host
- Notable work: Hospital IT (2017)

Angela Aquereburu (born 11 January 1977) is a Togolese screenwriter, film producer and film director.

== Biography ==
Aquereburu was born in Togo to a mother from Guadeloupe. Interested in the arts from a young age, she was educated in Togo and Pointe-a-Pitre, Guadeloupe before moving to Paris to study at ESCP Business School. She earned a master's degree in entrepreneurship. Aquereburu married actor Jean-Luc Rabatel and worked in human resources for several years. In 2008, while vacationing in Togo, she realized that there were only soap operas on television, and together with her husband came up with the idea for a series about motorcycle taxis. The following year, Aquereburu and Rabatel moved to Lomé and founded the audiovisual production company Yobo Studios. Their idea of a taxi show formed the basis for Zem, a mini-series of 26 five-minute episodes, co-produced by Canal + Afrique.

Her next project was the short series Palabres. In 2017, she launched Hospital IT, which tackles societal problems like malaria and skin whitening and focuses on the characters Idriss and Tania. Aquereburu said she was inspired by her second pregnancy to create the show. Grey's Anatomy served as a major influence. It won the prize for best series at the Vues d'Afrique Festival in Montreal.

In 2018, Aquereburu served as the presenter for Les Maternelles d'Afrique, an African version of the French show La Maison des Maternelles. She was inspired by the concerns of African mothers as well as her own family. The show tackles the controversial subject of polygamy in an impartial manner.

Aquereburu launched the series Oasis in 2019, featuring mainly Togolese actors. It details a young woman, Essé, who moves to the Oasis apartment complex as a spy but meets an old acquaintance. The series won the Audience Award at the 2018 Vue d'Afrique Festival and was selected at the 2018 La Rochelle Fiction Festival. She is a frequent critic of the low funding given to African TV producers.

== Filmography ==
- 2009 : Zem Season 1 (26x5min), co-director
- 2012 : Palabres (26x5min), co-director
- 2016 : Mi-Temps (40x3min), co-director
- 2016 : Zem season 2 (50x3min), co-director
- 2017 : Hospital IT (26x26min), co-director
- 2017 : Zem season 3 (60x3min), co-director
- 2018 : Les Maternelles d'Afrique Season 1 (20x26min), host
- 2019 : Oasis Season 1 (20x26min), co-director
- 2019 : Les Maternelles d'Afrique Season 2 (26x26min), host
- 2020 : Les Maternelles d'Afrique Season 3 (26x26), host
- 2023 : Web series AHOE, producer
