= Ángela García Rives =

Spanish librarian and archivist

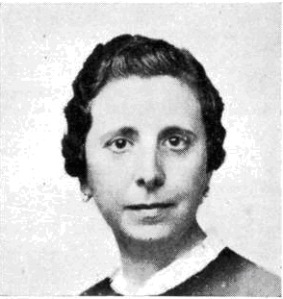
Ángela García Rives

Ángela Rafaela Ana García Rives (1891–1968 or later) was a Spanish librarian and archivist. A philosophy and letters graduate from Madrid's Central University, in 1913 she was the first woman to join the Spanish Corps of Archivists, Librarians, and Archeologists. The following year she was engaged by the Spanish National Library, heading the cataloguing department from 1946 until her retirement in 1961. In 1962, she was honoured with the Civil Order of Alfonso X, the Wise.

== Early life and education ==
Born in Madrid on 2 June 1891, Ángela Rafaela Ana García Rives (frequently known as Angelita) was the daughter of the lawyer and state librarian Moisés García y Muñoz and his wife Rafaela. The eldest of three children, her brothers were Luis (1896), who also became an archivist, and Moisés (1894), a lawyer.

After completing her schooling at the Instituto Cardenal Cisneros, she trained as a teacher at the Madrid Normal School and at the College for the Deaf and Blind. She then studied philosophy and literature at the Central University, receiving the Special Prize for History at her graduation in 1912. She went on to earn a doctorate in 1917 with a thesis on Ferdinand VI and Barbara of Braganza.

== Career ==
In 1913, García Reyes was the first woman to become a member of the Corps of Archivists, Librarians, and Archeologists. After working for short periods at the Jovellanos Public Library in Gijón and at the Central Archive in Alcalá de Henares, she passed the competitive examination allowing her to gain a post at the Spanish National Library in July 1914. She remained there for the next 46 years, heading the library's cataloguing department from January 1948 until her retirement in June 1961. Her success in becoming Spain's first female librarian was reported in the press in 1916.

The date of Ángela García Rives' death has not been established but she was apparently still living in 1968 when she was nominated as a candidate for the Medalla del Trabajo. She had received the Civil Order of Alfonso X, the Wise in 1961.
