= Angela Dawson =

Angela Dawson may refer to:

- Angela Dawson (canoeist) (born 1968), British sprint canoer
- Angela Dawson, Baltimore murder victim; see Dawson murder case
