= Angela Rosenthal =

Art historian

Angela Rosenthal

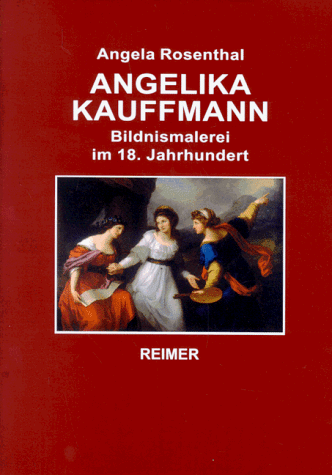
The cover of Rosenthal's first book: Angelika Kauffmann: Bildnismalerei im 18. Jahrhundert, 1996

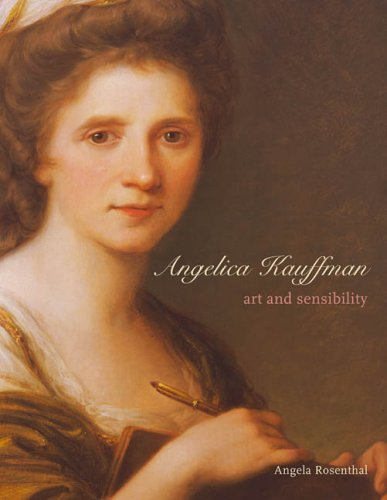
The cover of Rosenthal's masterwork, Angelica Kauffman: Art and sensibility, 2006

Angela H. Rosenthal (12 September 1963–11 November 2010) was an art historian at Dartmouth College and an expert on the art of Angelica Kauffman. Her masterwork was Angelica Kauffman: Art and sensibility, published by Yale University Press in 2006. It won the Historians of British Art Book Award in the pre-1800 category in 2007.

== Early life and family ==
Angela Rosenthal was born in Trier, Germany, to Peter and Anne Rosenthal. She had a sister, Felicia Rosenthal, who also became a professor. Previously, she had studied at University College London, the Courtauld Institute, and Westfield College.

Rosenthal attended the University of Trier, receiving a Ph.D in 1994.

She married Adrian Randolph, also an art historian and professor at Dartmouth College.

== Career ==
Rosenthal taught at the Staatsgalerie Saarbrucken and Northwestern University before joining Dartmouth College in 1997, where she was an associate professor of art history.

She edited a book of essays on William Hogarth and was an expert on the Austrian painter Angelica Kauffman, about whom she produced several books, including her authoritative Angelica Kauffman: Art and sensibility, which was published by Yale University Press in association with the Paul Mellon Centre for Studies in British Art in 2006. In 2007, that book won the Historians of British Art Book Award in the pre-1800 category.

Rosenthal also had an interest in the visual depiction of race and humour. In 2013, a book that she had been editing at the time of her death with Agnes Lugo-Ortiz on slave portraits in the Atlantic world was published. In 2015, an edited work on humour in the visual arts was completed by her husband Adrian Randolph and published by the Dartmouth College Press.

== Death ==
Rosenthal died from cancer at Dartmouth on 11 November 2010. At the time of her death, she was working on a second major work titled The White Enlightenment: Racializing Bodies in Eighteenth-Century British Visual Culture.

== Selected publications ==
- "Angelica Kauffman Ma(s)king Claims", Art History, March 1992, Vol. 15, Issue 1, pp 38-59.
- "Kauffman and portraiture", in Angelica Kauffman: A continental Artist in Georgian England, ed. by Wendy Wassyng Roworth. London, Reaktion Books, 1992. pp. 96-111. ISBN 0948462418
- Angelika Kauffmann: Bildnismalerei im 18. Jahrhundert. Reimer, 1996. (German language) ISBN 978-3496011514
- The other Hogarth: Aesthetics of difference. Princeton University Press, Princeton, 2001. (edited with Bernadette Fort) ISBN 0691010129
- Angelica Kauffman: Art and sensibility. Yale University Press in association with the Paul Mellon Centre for Studies in British Art, New Haven, 2006. ISBN 978-0300103335
- Angelica Kauffman in British collections: An exhibition to commemorate the 200th anniversary of her death/[with] an essay by Angela Rosenthal: Recollecting Kauffman. Rafael Valls, London, 2007.
- Slave portraiture in the Atlantic world. Cambridge University Press, Cambridge, 2013. (edited with Agnes Lugo-Ortiz) ISBN 978-1107004399
- No laughing matter: Visual humor in ideas of race, nationality, and ethnicity. Dartmouth College Press, Lebanon, New Hampshire, 2015. (edited with David Bindman and Adrian W.B. Randolph) ISBN 978-1611688207
