= Angela Maraventano =

Italian politician

Senator Angela Maraventano

Italian Senator
- In office April 29, 2008 – March 14, 2013
- Constituency: Emilia Romagna

Personal details
- Born: September 14, 1964 (age 61) San Benedetto del Tronto
- Party: Northern League

Angela Maraventano (born September 14, 1964) is an Italian politician, senator of Northern League elected in Emilia-Romagna during the election of 2008. She was deputy-mayor of Lampedusa from May 2007 to January 2009.
