= Angela C. Popp =

American film director

Angela Cornelia Monica Popp (born September 10, 1968) is working as a director, screenwriter, songwriter and producer in Los Angeles, New York, San Francisco, Berlin, Hamburg and Munich.

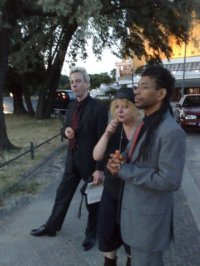
Bernhard Beutler, Angie Popp, Joaquin de LaHabana f.l

== Life and career ==
Angela C. Popp was born on September 10, 1968, in West Berlin.

After she got her A-Level, she studied at the University of Arts Berlin from October 1992 until April 1995 with studies in Visual Communication. While in school, she has worked for FAB (Television from Berlin) from February 1993 until May 1995. She also spent time in Berlin, from November 1997 until February 1998 taking a seminar in Film Producing given by Willi Egger.

From 1997 to 2003, she moved back and forth from Los Angeles and Berlin. Then she moved to Los Angeles to live and work there as a Resident Artist. In 2005 the Directors Guild of Germany decided to accept her as a member. After she produced "HIV positive women", Popp took classes in film directing at LA Film School from June, 2005 - September 2005. When she returned to Berlin, she took a seminar in Screenwriting at the Masterschool of Screenwriting Medienboard Berlin/Brandenburg. She was accepted into the German Director's Guild in 2005. In August 2010 she participated in the Screenwriting Master Class of Filmmakers Alliance in Los Angeles, U.S.A. Currently she is performing in a Band as a Lead Singer.In 2013 her new Album "Homesick" from her Band "California Hemp Pirates" will be released.L.A. is her Home Until Present Day.

== Film festivals ==
The Last Supper, aka Abendmahl, was shown at the Morbegno Film Festival in Morbegno, Italy in 2002, at the British Film Institute's 17th London Lesbian & Gay Film Festival in 2003 and in 2004 at the Pink Screens Festival in Finland as well as at the Queer Zagreb International Film Festival.

She has also had a film shown at the Rhode Island Film Festival and at a Film festival in South Africa.

== Filmography ==
=== Short films ===
- 2012 The Magic Of Three, short movie episodes Los Angeles, Feed The World
- 2012 The Magic Of Three, short movie episodes Hamburg, Just Like Heaven. The Sword Fighter on Rickmer Rickmers
- 2011 Affections
- 2011 currently The Magic Of Three, short movie episodes Berlin,
- 2010 currently Who
- 2007 Fate
- 2006 Isolation
- 2005 All about your fear
- 2003 Sweetheart
- 2002 Last Supper
- 2000 Secrets

=== Documentaries ===
- 2011 Metal-A Journey from the 80's...
- 2009 Model Casting by A-P Van York
- 2007 Modern Heroes
- 2005 - 2006 Sand Sculptures
- 2004 - 2005 HIV positive women
- 2004 Sects
- 1999-2002 Fairs: IFA, Expo, Cebit
