= Angela Murray Gibson =

American film director

Angela Murray Gibson (June 29, 1878 – October 22, 1953) was a writer, director, actress, and the first newsreel camerawoman.

== Early life ==
Angela Murray Gibson was born in Scotland in 1878. Her family emigrated when she was five, settling in Casselton, North Dakota, United States. Her father was rarely home due to working as a travel agent to help support the family, Gibson lived with her mother and her older sister Ruby in a small apartment in Fargo, North Dakota. She became infatuated with the film industry, and made her own productions featuring her Scottish heritage.

Gibson became one of the first women to graduate from what is now known as North Dakota State University. With the profits from Ruby's clothing store, once Gibson graduated, her sister paid for a trip to Scotland in 1908 for Gibson to study the culture and dress of her homeland. When Gibson returned to the U.S. she put together a show performed on a Scottish harp. In 1911 she took her performance all over the U.S. and Canada.

In 1916, she was approached by motion picture actress Mary Pickford, who was making a movie called The Pride of the Clan. Pickford flew her out to Hollywood for six weeks to work on this 1917 production, where Gibson helped as an adviser and assistant director to Maurice Tourneur. He wanted the movie to be authentic, and with Gibson's Scottish background, she was able to offer advice on costumes, dances and dialogue. These two got along very well, and a successful film. Gibson also gained acting experience from this film, as she played a small role in it.

== Career ==
That Ice Ticket (1922), Gibson's first comedy film

After Gibson's first assistant directing production wrapped up, she attended Columbia University to study cinematography. After graduating she bought a camera and one lens and headed back to her home town of Casselton, North Dakota. She opened the state's first movie studio that was completely run and financed by women. She became the studio's writer, director and actress, while her sister Ruby ran the business side. Somebody had to crank the camera, which was the job of Gibson's mother, as she became the film crew. Gibson took advantage of the natural light at her studio, where she made outdoor canvases with which to film her movies. She did all of her own film processing as well as editing.

Gibson started off with two film documentaries, one about the life of a grain of wheat and the other about a rodeo. When the movies were completed she went to local film distributors. Her first comedy film was titled That Ice Ticket.

With the start of the Great Depression, Gibson was forced to stop making films due to her financial situation, and turned the Gibson Studio into a dance studio, where she became the instructor.

== Later years ==
Gibson was diagnosed with tuberculosis in the 1940s and died on October 22, 1953. While she was sick she spent most of her days at an institution for chronic diseases.

During her later years a lot of her films and documentaries disappeared or greatly deteriorated. However, in 1976, the Centennial Commission discovered what remained of some of her lost films, and in contract with Snyder Films salvaged what films and documentaries that could be restored. A lot of the film had water damage, but some was able to be saved since Gibson had backed up some of her work on safety films. In 1997, the film The Angela Gibson Experience was released. This film was also featured in the 2001 Fargo Film Festival.
