= Angela Faustina =

American painter

Angela Faustina (born 1986) is an American contemporary realism artist.

== Artwork ==
Her artwork consists mainly of paintings and outdoor murals depicting close-ups of fruit like pomegranate, peaches, figs, kiwi, and other citrus fruits. It captures macro details of fresh fruit cut open when ripe. It has been described by Signet Contemporary Art as 'intimate, surprising, enigmatic, and bold .'

Her artwork is exhibited and collected internationally. It has been displayed in multiple art exhibitions around the world in places such as the United States, Italy, and Portugal, the United Kingdom, Singapore, Australia, and Hong Kong Faustina's murals are located throughout the Southeastern United States in cities like Atlanta, Marietta, St. Petersburg, and Florence, Alabama. She competed in the 2018 SHINE St. Petersburg Mural Festival and the 2019 OuterSpace Project Mural Festival.

== Personal ==
In 2009 Angela Faustina graduated summa cum laude from the New College of Florida in Sarasota, Florida. She also temporarily attended the Ringling College of Art and Design in Sarasota and Parsons School of Design in New York.

Faustina resides in Atlanta, Georgia.
