= Angela Masi =

Italian politician

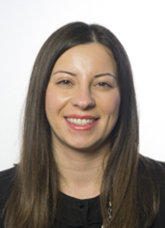

Member of the Chamber of Deputies
- Incumbent
- Assumed office 23 March 2018
- Constituency: Apulia

Personal details
- Born: 8 January 1987 (age 39) Bari, Italy
- Party: Five Star Movement
- Education: University of Bari
- Profession: Politician

Angela Masi (born January 8, 1987) is an Italian politician affiliated with the Five Star Movement. She began her term in the Chamber of Deputies on 23 March 2018.

== Life ==
Angela Masi was born on January 10, 1987, in the Italian city Bari. After graduating in 2005 from Italian high school Istituto Professionale Statale per i Servizi Commerciali e Turistici (IPSSCT) "Nino Lorusso", located in Altamura, Angela Masi enrolled in the economics degree course at the University of Bari, where she graduated in 2012 with a score of 110/110 cum laude.

Over her career, she managed to organize study and work, working either as a receptionist, employee or manager. In particular, she became involved in an innovative (yet short-lived) project, i.e. a refilling station for detergents and food (whose name was Tuttosfuso), aimed at reducing the production of waste generated by empty containers.

Both as a citizen and as a deputy of Italian Parliament, she exhibited great sensitivity to topics such as environmental protection, the enhancement of her native region Apulia and the so-called "reshoring" of Italian companies.
