= Angela Jacobs =

American television journalist (1969–2022)

- Born: Angela Sue Jacobs; March 1, 1969; Harrisburg, Pennsylvania, U.S
- Died: July 19, 2022 (aged 53); Orlando, Florida, U.S
- Occupations: Anchor; reporter

Angela Sue Jacobs (March 1, 1969 – July 19, 2022) was an American anchor and reporter in Tampa Bay, Florida and a long-time reporter at WFTV Channel 9 in Orlando, Florida. While working as an anchor and reporter in Tampa Bay, she received several awards including two regional Emmy Awards.

She died on July 19, 2022, after a battle with metastatic breast cancer.

== Early life ==
Jacobs was born in Harrisburg, Pennsylvania, on March 1, 1969, to Richard and Ramona Jacobs.
