= Angela Reynolds =

British stage and television actress

Angela Reynolds is a British stage and television actress. Her most prolific role so far has been playing Fizz for The Tweenies, both on television and on stage.

Her natural accent is London, and she is a mezzo-soprano.

Angela Reynolds co-runs an interactive stilt walking entertainment company called Bright'n'Funny and runs her own company Funnyballoons.
