= Angela Ginovska =

Macedonian footballer

Personal information
- Date of birth: 31 August 1993 (age 33)
- Position: Defender

International career^{‡}
Years	Team	Apps	(Gls)
2010–2011	North Macedonia U-19	7	(0)
2009–2013	North Macedonia	4	(0)
- ‡ National team caps and goals as of 10:17, 21 September 2021 (UTC)

Angela Ginovska (born 31 August 1993) is a Macedonian footballer who plays as a defender for the North Macedonia national team.

== International career ==
Ginovska made her debut for the North Macedonia national team on 25 October 2009, against Belarus.
