= Angela Little =

Angela Little may refer to:

- Angela Little (academic) (born 1949), British education and development academic
- Angela Little (actress) (born 1972), American model and actress
