= Angela Brown (disambiguation) =

Angela Brown (born 1963) is an American dramatic soprano.

Angie Brown (born 1963) is a British singer-songwriter.

Angela or Angie Brown(e) may also refer to:

- Angela Browne (1938–2001), British actress
- Angela Brown (Hollyoaks), a character in the British television soap opera
- Angela Browne (nun) (1884–?), Irish Australian nun
- Angela Gisela Brown (born 1958), Panamanian princess of Liechtenstein
- Angela Laverne Brown (1961–2025), American recording artist, producer, and actress known as Angie Stone
- Angela Brown (athlete), American long jumper who ranked second in the 1999 Pan American Games
- Angela Brown (writer), nominated in the 17th Lambda Literary Awards
- Angela Brown-Burke, Jamaican politician

== See also ==
- Angela Brown-Burke, Jamaican politician
- Angela Browning (born 1946), British politician
