= Angela Cardoso =

Angela Cardoso may refer to:

- Ângela Cardoso (born 1979), Angolan basketball player
- Angela Cardoso (tennis) (born 1980), Portuguese tennis player
