= Angela Lanfranchi =

American surgeon and political activist

Angela Lanfranchi (born June 12, 1950) is an American breast cancer surgeon and anti-abortion activist. In 1999, she co-founded the Breast Cancer Prevention Institute with Joel Brind, John T. Bruchalski, and William L. Toffler. Lanfranchi is the president of the institute. She is known for advocating for a link between abortion and breast cancer, as well as for claiming that the pill has serious adverse health effects, such as causing women who take it to prefer partners more genetically similar to themselves. In 2014, she was the keynote speaker at the World Congress of Families in Melbourne, Australia.
