= Angela Elis =

German television presenter, journalist, book author and coach

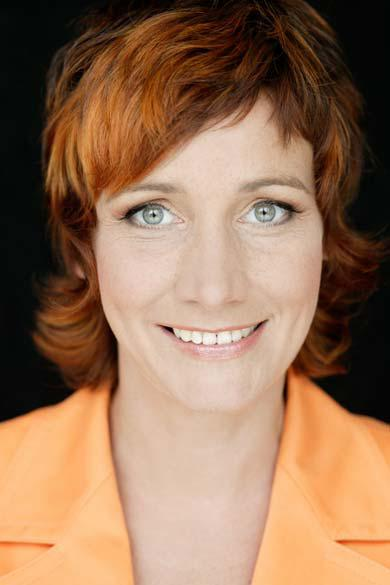
Image of Angela Elis

Angela Elis (born May 14, 1966, in Leipzig) is a German television presenter, journalist, book author, and coach.

== Life ==
Angela Elis grew up in GDR-times in Markkleeberg near Leipzig and was unable to graduate from high school after the tenth grade (Abschluss mit Auszeichnung) because she came from a religious family and her mother was also self-employed with her own store for milk and cheese products.

After completing vocational training as a commercial artist/designer, she trained as a teacher for children, youth and elderly work at the church seminary in Greifswald. She then studied theology in Leipzig and East Berlin via a special school-leaving examination, but left the GDR in 1988 to continue her studies in Frankfurt am Main.

After an abbreviated traineeship at Hessischer Rundfunk, she initially worked as a freelance journalist at MDR from 1993, but soon hosted various programs: first the consumer magazine Telethek, the news magazine Dabei ab 2, the business magazine Umschau (from 2001 to 2004, for which she started as a reporter in 1995) and the talk shows Auf den Punkt and Fakt ist...! From 1999 to 2007 she presented the science and future magazine nano on 3sat, from 2001 the ZDF environmental magazine ZDF.umwelt – Naturnahes Fernsehen, later the business magazine WISO and from 2003 the MDR job journal JoJo, from 2004 to 2008 the ARD magazine FAKT and the MDR magazine nah dran, as well as various special programs (e.g. China-Spezial, Indien-Spezial, MDR-Magazin nah dran). China special, India special, EU eastward expansion, inauguration of the Dresden Frauenkirche).

In March 2008, Angela Elis announced a break from the screen to devote herself to her family and her two children and to write books. She first wrote "Typisch Ossi – Typisch Wessi", then "Kreuzweise deutsch", as well as the first biography of Bertha Benz, the wife of car inventor Carl Benz and the world's first female long-distance driver, entitled "Mein Traum ist länger als die Nacht".

This was followed by the socio-critical analysis "Betrüger Republik Deutschland", in which she deals with the increasing tendency towards fake news and illusory worlds in the economy, media, food production and healthcare, which ultimately culminate in the virtual world, in which awareness of reality and orientation are dwindling.

In the meantime, Angela Elis also moderates events for ministries, companies, organizations, institutions, foundations.

In addition she qualified as a "Systemic Coach" at the ISCO Academy (recognized by the DBVC) and as a "Business and Resilience Coach" at the HBT Academy (recognized by the DVWO for tested and excellent professional quality). Her topics in coaching, media training or workshops are primarily effective communication, convincing appearance and resilience (healthy performance despite stress, crisis and change), but also creativity and innovative strength.

Her book entitled "ON AIR – Bühne, Online, Kamera" deals with the question of how to develop more presence, impact and charisma.

Angela Elis runs her own YouTube channel "WERTvoll", on which she posts advice videos and conducts "WERTvolle Gespräche".

== Works ==
- with Michael Jürgs: Typisch Ossi, typisch Wessi. Eine längst fällige Abrechnung unter Brüdern und Schwestern. Bertelsmann, München 2005, ISBN 3-570-00862-2.
- with Michael Jürgs: Kreuzweise Deutsch. Aufbau-Verlag, Berlin 2009, ISBN 978-3-7466-7066-9.
- Mein Traum ist länger als die Nacht. Wie Bertha Benz ihren Mann zu Weltruhm fuhr. Hoffmann und Campe, Hamburg 2010, ISBN 978-3-455-50146-9.
- Betrüger Republik Deutschland. Streifzug durch eine verlogene Gesellschaft. Piper, München 2012, ISBN 978-3-492-05520-8.
- ON AIR – Bühne, Online, Kamera. Für mehr Präsenz, Wirkung und Charisma. Bourdon 2022, ISBN 978-3-949869-56-3
