= Angelita =

Angelita is a given name that is the diminutive of Angel or Angela in various languages. Individuals named Angelita include:

- Angelita Lind (born 1959), a Puerto Rican track and field athlete
- Angelita Mejia, American politician
- Angelita Morillo, American politician
- Angelita Trujillo (1939–2023), Dominican author and daughter of dictator Rafael Trujillo
- Angelita Grace Velasquez Aquino (born 1973), known as Angel Aquino, Filipina actress
- USCGC Sea Cloud (WPG-284), weather ship for the United States Coast Guard, renamed Angelita in honor for Angelita Trujillo
