= Angela Myles Beeching =

American writer

Angela Myles Beeching is a noted arts career specialist.

She is the author of Beyond Talent: Creating a Successful Career in Music, first published by Oxford University Press in 2005. An expanded second edition was released in 2010 and builds on the success of the first edition. The book is widely used by professional and student musicians and frequently serves as a central career development text in music programs.

Beeching provides a range of consulting services for creative individuals, ensembles, and institutions. She was the Director of Manhattan School of Music's Center for Music Entrepreneurship. During the 2010-11 academic year she was a visiting consultant/adjunct faculty at IU Jacobs School of Music leading Project Jumpstart, a student-centered and student-driven career and entrepreneurial leadership program. Beeching is the former director of the Career Services Center at New England Conservatory.

Fulbright Scholar and recipient of the Harriet Hale Woolley grant, she holds a doctorate in cello performance from Stony Brook University. Dr. Beeching studied cello in Paris with Roland Pidoux and in the US with Timothy Eddy. She held faculty teaching positions at Cal State Fresno and SUNY Potsdam before returning to Boston.

She has also written for Classical Singer, Inside Arts, and Chamber Music magazines. In addition to workshops at many conservatories and schools of music, Ms. Beeching has presented at national conferences for arts administrators, music educators, and performers. A leader in the field of music career development, she is the co-founder of NETMCDO, the Network of Music Career Development Officers, the international organization dedicated to enhancing music career development.
