= Angela Dalle Vacche =

American academic

Angela Dalle Vacche is a professor emerita at the Georgia Institute of Technology within its School of Literature, Media, and Communication. She is a scholar of film studies, with a specialization in world cinema and Italian cinema, and has authored multiple books. One of her notable works, "Diva: Defiance and Passion in Early Italian Cinema," delves into the concept of the Italian diva and its significance in promoting "emancipation and self-discovery" for female viewers in Italian cinema.

== Education ==
Dalle Vacche received her M.S. in American Studies in 1980 from Mount Holyoke College. In 1985, she received her doctorate in Films Studies from the University of Iowa. Her dissertation received honorable mention in the Society for Cinema Studies Dissertation Contest.

== Career ==
Dalle Vacche worked as an associate professor at Yale University from 1987-1997, and Emory from 1997-2001, where she was nominated for Phi Beta Kappa's Excellence in Teaching award in 2000she was nominated for Phi Beta Kappa's Excellence in Teaching award in 2000. In 2001, she joined the Georgia Institute of Technology as a tenured professor of film studies in the School of Literature, Media, and Communication.

Dalle Vacche has lectured internationally. In the summer of 2016, she lectured on Cinema and the Museum at the Institute for Marketing and Technology in Lucca, Italy and traveled throughout Europe, Asia, and Australia lecturing on similar topics. She has taught classes on a wide range of film-related topics, including “Identity in Film”, “Vampires, Modernity, Technology in Literature and Film,” and “Cinema and Architecture, Space and Landscape.”

Dalle Vacche has published several books and articles on Italian cinema. Two of her books, Diva: Defiance and Passion in Early Italian Cinema and The Body in the Mirror: Shapes of History in Italian Cinema, explore the roles that gender, culture, and history have played in the genre. Her articles on the topic include “Le Paysage du cinema italien” in CinemAction and “The Diva-Image in 1911: Visual Form, Cultural Paradigm, Perceptual Model” in Cinema and Other Arts.

Dalle Vacche has directed films on Italian cinema. Art Forum declared the 2000 New York Film Festival showing of her short film, “Passion and Defiance: Silent Divas of the Italian Cinema,” as “Best Event of the Year.”

== Select works ==
- Dalle Vacche, Angela. The Body in the Mirror: Shapes of History in Italian Cinema. Princeton University Press, 1992.
- Dalle Vacche, Angela. "Andre Bazin and The System of the Arts" in Opening Bazin: Postwar Film Theory and Its Afterlife, edited by Andrew, Dudley et al. Oxford University Press, 2001.
- Dalle Vacche, Angela. Diva: What is a Diva? What is a Diva-Film?. Vienna Film Museum, 2007.
- Dalle Vacche, Angela. Defiance and Passion in Early Italian Cinema. University of Texas Press, 2008.
- Dalle Vacche, Angela. "Film Studies and International Understanding." In: Humanistic Perspectives in a Technological World. Ed. Richard Utz. Atlanta: Georgia Institute of Technology, 2014. online version
- Dalle Vacche, Angela. André Bazin's Film Theory. Oxford University Press, 2019.
