= Angela Williams =

Angela Williams is the name of

- Angela Williams (sprinter, born 1965), American sprinter of Trinidad and Tobago descent
- Angela Williams (sprinter, born 1980), American sprinter
- Angela Williams (politician) (born 1964), Member of the Colorado House of Representatives
