= Angela Jansen =

American artist

- Born: Angela Bing; 1929 (age 96–97)
- Known for: Painting; sculpture; printmaking; photography

Angela Jansen (born 1929), also known as Angela Bing Jansen, is an American painter, sculptor, printmaker and photographer. Jansen is known primarily for her printmaking.

Jansen studied at Brooklyn College, receiving a degree in art and design in the 1950s. Around the same time, she took art classes at the Brooklyn Museum Art School. In the early 1950s Jansen was invited to work at Atelier 17, a printmaking studio in New York City, by Stanley Hayter.

Her work was regularly mentioned in The Print Collector's Newsletter. Her work is also included in the collections of the Art Institute of Chicago; the Tate Gallery, London; the National Gallery of Art, Washington; and the Museum of Modern Art, New York.
