= Angela Barker =

Australian advocate for victims of domestic violence

Angela Barker is an Australian advocate for victims of domestic violence.

== Assault and recovery ==
On 7 March 2002, at 16 years old, Barker was assaulted by her 20-year-old boyfriend. They had been dating since Angela was 14, and he had previously assaulted her multiple times. His attacks culminated that day in 2002, after Barker refused to date him after they had previously broken up. He beat her, and Barker was found by a passerby. After the assault, Angela's family was told that she would remain in a vegetative state forever. After the attack, she spent 8 weeks in the hospital, five months in rehabilitative therapy, and three years in a rehabilitation hospital. She now uses a wheelchair, and was left with severe brain injury and without the ability to talk. After five years, she regained the ability to talk. Barker does not recall the 12 months before the attack, and her memory has only recovered to somewhere within thirteen and fifteen. Her former boyfriend later turned himself in, and was sentenced to serve a minimum of seven and a half years in prison.

== Activism ==
As of 2011, Angela has shared her story with over 10,000 teens across Australia and internationally. She has worked with the Young People in Nursing Homes Alliance, and represented young people at multiple Australian Labor Party conferences.

In 2004, Angela's story was made into a film entitled Loves Me, Loves Me Not: Angela Barker's Story by the Australian government for their Violence Against Women Australia Says No campaign. In 2007, Angela told the story of her assault in a special session of the United Nations General Assembly devoted to children. She was chosen as one of 15 women to meet at the UN for a four-day conference on activism and policy.

In 2011, Barker was voted Victoria's Young Australian of the Year.

In 2015, she was the special guest at a White Ribbon Day march in Lakemba. Barker also appeared in a 2019 episode of You Can’t Ask That, in an episode focused on domestic and family violence survivors. Alongside other survivors, she detailed her experience and answered several common questions faced by survivors in order to raise awareness.
