= Angela Diaz =

Medical practitioner and academic

- Born: Dominican Republic

Academic background
- Education: BA, City College of New York; MD, Columbia University College of Physicians and Surgeons; MPH, Harvard University; PhD, Epidemiology, Columbia University

Angela Diaz is an American doctor. She is the Director of the Mount Sinai Adolescent Health Center and professor at the Icahn School of Medicine at Mount Sinai.

== Early life and education ==
Diaz was born and raised in the Dominican Republic where she became inspired to become a doctor after surviving two severe accidents. When Angela was eight, her mother left the Dominican Republic to move to The Bronx and she joined her mother at the age of 12. However, Diaz overstayed her visa and spent one year back in the Dominican Republic before her papers were in order. Upon returning to the United States permanently at the age of 15, she enrolled in a local high school. However, during this time, she became severely depressed and dropped out of school. After going to the Mount Sinai Adolescent Health Center for assistance, the doctors there encouraged her to return to school and she graduated. Following high school, she enrolled at the City College of New York while working at a factory with her mother.

While still earning her undergraduate degree, Diaz was admitted into the Columbia University College of Physicians and Surgeons despite not taking the standard medical school exams or paying the $15 application fee. Upon finishing her medical degree there, she earned a PhD from Columbia University in epidemiology and a Master in Public Health degree from Harvard University.

== Career ==
As a medical student, Diaz intended on becoming a neurosurgeon but changed her mind after a rotation in pediatrics. Following her residency at the Mount Sinai Center, she accepted an offer to run the center in 1989. During the 1990s, she eventually became a professor and vice chair of the Department of Pediatrics at the Icahn School of Medicine at Mount Sinai. Diaz also served as director of Health Services for the Children's Aid Society of New York. In 1995, she was appointed a White House fellow under the Clinton administration where she examined health care policies in the U.S. Territories in the Pacific and the Caribbean.

By the early 2000s, Diaz's research covered adolescent reproductive health and childhood sexual victimization. She also focused on international health issues including advocating for these issues and policies within the United States. In 2008, Diaz was elected a member of the National Academy of Medicine (then referred to as the Institute of Medicine). In 2016, Diaz was honored as an Ambassador of Health at the New York City Dominican Day Parade. The following year, Diaz was elected to the governing council of the National Academy of Medicine. In 2019, Diaz and Jonathan Todres co-authored a book titled Preventing Child Trafficking: A Public Health Approach.

== Personal life ==
As of 2020, Diaz's daughter Daniela teaches at Columbia University Vagelos College of Physicians and Surgeons.
