= Angela Dean (trustee) =

British banker and trustee

Angela Dean is a British banker and trustee.

== Biography ==
Dean has a DPhil in early 17th century politics from Somerville College, Oxford.

She was a managing director of Morgan Stanley. In 2013 and 2014 she was listed as one of the '100 women to watch' in the Female FTSE Board Report by Cranfield University. In September 2018 Dean was appointed to a four-year term on the board of Ofcom. Dean was appointed as a trustee of the Heritage Lottery Fund in 2012 and of York Museums Trust in 2017. Dean currently Chairs the International House Trust. She is also a member of Council for King's College London.
