= Angela Dean =

British statistician

Angela Muriel Dean
- Education: University of Southampton
- Known for: Design of experiments
- Awards: Fellow of the American Statistical Association (1995); Fellow of the Institute of Mathematical Statistics (2002)
- Scientific career
- Fields: Statistics
- Institutions: The Open University; University of Texas at Austin; Ohio State University
- Thesis: (1975)

Angela Muriel Dean is a British statistician who specializes in the design of experiments. She is a professor emeritus at the Ohio State University, and was the chair of the Section on Physical and Engineering Sciences of the American Statistical Association for 2012.

Dean read mathematics at the University of Southampton, and earned a bachelor's degree there in 1971. She completed a Ph.D. at Southampton in 1975. She taught at The Open University (1975–1980) and at the University of Texas at Austin (1978–1979) before joining the Ohio State faculty in 1980. Since 2003 she has also been an associate member of the Southampton Statistical Sciences Research Institute. She retired from Ohio State and became a professor emeritus there in 2011.

With Daniel Voss, Dean is the author of Design and Analysis of Experiments (Springer, 1999; 2nd ed., with Danel Draguljić, 2017).

In 1993 Dean was elected to the International Statistical Institute. In 1995 she became a Fellow of the American Statistical Association. She was also elected as a Fellow of the Institute of Mathematical Statistics in 2002.
