= Angela Jager =

Dutch art historian and curator (born 1984)

- Born: 1984 (age 41–42)
- Education: University of Amsterdam
- Occupations: curator, art historian

Angela Jager (born 1984) is a Dutch art historian and curator, known for her research and contributions to the fields of Dutch Golden Age painting and Flemish painting. She is Curator of Dutch and Flemish Old Master Painting at the RKD – Netherlands Institute for Art History, in The Hague.

== Education ==
Angela Jager received her PhD in 2016 from the University of Amsterdam. Her doctoral research focused on inexpensive paintings in seventeenth-century Amsterdam and was based in part on the study of over 300 probate inventories from lower-middle-class households.

That same year, won the Association of Research Institutes in Art History Prize for Online Publishing for her article “‘Everywhere illustrious histories that are a dime a dozen’: The Mass Market for History Painting in Seventeenth-Century Amsterdam,” published in the Journal of Historians of Netherlandish Art.

== Career ==
Following her PhD, she worked as a postdoctoral researcher at the Statens Museum for Kunst in Copenhagen, where she studied a large private collection of Old Master paintings. From 2019 to 2021, she was a researcher at the University of Geneva, contributing to the RKD-database "Visiting the Golden Age".

In November 2021, Jager was appointed as Curator of Dutch and Flemish Old Master Painting at the RKD. In this role, she is also working on a collection catalogue of Dutch and Flemish old master paintings from the Nivaagaards Malerisamling in Denmark, alongside Jørgen Wadum.

Jager and Wadumn in 2023, found through their research, that two separate portraits by Cornelis de Vos were actually once part of a large canvas and were therefore one large portrait that has been separated. The discovery was covered in global news outlets, including NPR.

== Research and grants ==
Jager's research interests include the international art trade in the early modern period, workshop production, and the interpretation of archival sources related to artists and art dealers. She has received significant grants, including a Marie Skłodowska-Curie grant for her research.

== Publications ==
- The Mass Market for History Paintings in Seventeenth-Century Amsterdam: Production, Distribution and Consumption. Amsterdam: Amsterdam University Press, 2020.
- "Selling Paintings to Sweden: Toussaint Gelton’s Correspondence with Pontus Fredrik de la Gardie." Oud Holland - Journal for Art of the Low Countries 133, no. 2 (2020): 108–127.
- With Stephanie Dickey. "New Light on Family Ties: Rembrandt, Vinck, Van Swanenburgh." Kroniek van het Rembrandthuis, 2022.
- With Marije Osnabrugge, contributions by Susanna Bartels and Lucie Rochard. Op bezoek in de Republiek: Reisverslagen uit de zeventiende en achttiende eeuw. Zwolle: WBOOKS, 2022.
- With Jørgen Wadum and Marta Domínquez-Delmás. "Unraveling a 17th-century North Netherlandish Panel Maker." International Journal of Wood Culture, 2023.

== Exhibitions ==
Jager has contributed to several exhibitions, including:

- Visiting the Golden Age (University of Geneva)
- Dutch and Flemish Old Master Paintings (Nivaagaards Malerisamling)

== Affiliations ==
Jager is an Associate Member of CODART and the European Liaison of the Historians of Netherlandish Art (HNA). She also co-hosts the HNA Podcast, highlighting new scholarly work in her field.
