= Angela Restrepo Moreno =

Colombian scientist

- Born: 1931; Medellín, Colombia
- Died: 2022 (aged 90–91)

Angela Restrepo Moreno (1931–2022) was a Colombian microbiologist who studied the diagnosis and treatment of diseases caused by fungi.

Restrepo was born in Medellín, Colombia. During her career, she received multiple national and international awards. Restrepo was affiliated with the University of Antioquia; the Pontifical Bolivarian University; the San Jose Valley Medical Center; the California Institute for Medical Research; the University of Texas Health Science Center; the St. John's Institute of Dermatology; the Guy's and St Thomas' NHS Foundation Trust; and the University of London.
