= Angela Garbes =

American writer

- Spouse: Will
- Children: 2
- Writing career
- Genre: Nonfiction
- Subject: Motherhood
- Website: www.angelagarbes.com

Angela Garbes is an American author. She has written two nonfiction books about motherhood: Like a Mother: A Feminist Journey through the Science and Culture of Pregnancy (2018) and Essential Labor: Mothering as Social Change (2022). Garbes is the daughter of Filipino immigrants. She began her career as a food writer for The Stranger, an alternative newspaper in Seattle.

In The Cut, Sara Petersen wrote that Essential Labor "examines the collective power of mothering and interrogates how individuals can both fight for systemic changes (like affordable quality child care, paid family leave, and comprehensive maternal health care) and reclaim acts of mothering in our own lives." In the Los Angeles Review of Books, Sarah Stoller wrote that in Essential Labor, "Garbes draws on decades of insights from Black, Indigenous, and queer feminists, imploring us to reimagine ourselves not as atomized households but as members of communities that share the work of care."
