= Angela M. Rivers =

African-American artist and curator (born 1953)

- Born: 1953 (age 71–72); Champaign–Urbana , Illinois, U.S.
- Education: University of Illinois
- Alma mater: University of Illinois College of Fine and Applied Arts
- Known for: Painting, education, programming, historic research
- Notable work: Park Street Mural, Champaign Heritage Trail
- Style: symbolism
- Movement: Champaign Heritage Trail
- Relatives: Barbara Suggs Mason (Cousin) Cecil Dewey Nelson Jr. (Uncle) Allen Albert Rivers, Sr. (Grandfather)

Angela M. Rivers (born 1953 in Champaign, Illinois) is an African American artist and curator, currently living in Chicago.

== Career ==
Angela has a BFA in Fine and Applied Arts from the University of Illinois Urbana-Champaign in 1975.

In 1978 she created a mural in Fifth and Park Streets in north Champaign with a group of African American students and community members.

From 1978 to 1981 she studied Paul Gauguin's work at Eastern Illinois University. She then moved to Chicago to work as an art curator. She worked for the DuSable Museum of African American History, the Chicago History Museum, and the Art Institute of Chicago.

In 2009 she was an artist-in-residence at the University of Illinois, where she did a commemoration of the anniversary of the mural in Champaign.

Angela's uncle was visual artist Cecil Dewey Nelson, Jr.

She helped create the Champaign County African American Heritage Trail in 2020, a project dedicated to highlighting the history of African Americans of Champaign County and their influence on the community. Medias for this project include a tour bus and a website with a list of notable individuals involved with the development and history of Champaign Illinois.
