= Angela Lichty =

Canadian softball player

Personal information
- Born: December 30, 1979 (age 46) Guelph, Ontario, Canada
- Education: Simon Fraser University
- Occupation: baseball player

Angela Lichty (born December 30, 1979) is a Canadian softball shortstop. She started softball at age seven, and is a graduate of Simon Fraser University. She was a part of the Canada women's national softball team who finished ninth at the 2002 World Championships in Saskatoon, Saskatchewan and part of the Canadian team who finished fifth at the 2004 Summer Olympics.

Angela Lichty played third base and shortstop for the SFU Clan from 1999 to 2002, helping the team win its first NAIA championship title in 1999.

In 2018 she was inducted into SFU's Athletic Hall of Fame in honour of her four-year stint playing third base and shortstop for the SFU Clan from 1999 to 2002.
