= Angela Ghayour =

Afghan educator and advocate

- Born: December 1985 (age 40); Herat, Afghanistan
- Education: Herat University (Persian literature)
- Occupations: Educator, women's rights advocate
- Known for: Founder of the Herat Online School and Afghanistan Education Action
- Children: 3
- Awards: BBC 100 Women (2021)

Angela Ghayour is an Afghan educator and advocate for women's rights. After facing challenges with formal education as a child refugee in Iran, she began teaching literacy and numeracy to other refugee children. She founded Afghanistan Education Action.

== Early life and education ==
Ghayour was born in Herat, Afghanistan, in December 1985, and faced challenges with formal education during her early years as a refugee in Iran. The family left Afghanistan in 1992, at the start of the country's civil war. From around the age of 13, she taught literacy and numeracy to other Afghan refugee children in the garden of her father, who worked as a gardener.

After returning to Afghanistan in 2002, she pursued higher education at Herat University, earning a degree in Persian literature. Her experiences in Afghan classrooms and the impact of the Taliban's rule on education deeply influenced her.

== Life and career ==
She later moved to the Netherlands and, in 2018, settled in the United Kingdom with her three children. She lives in Brighton, where she has worked part-time as an engineering assistant alongside running her school.

Ghayour founded the Herat Online School on 16 August 2021, the day after the Taliban takeover of Kabul, using social media and Telegram to recruit volunteer teachers. The school grew from 35 students and a handful of Iran-based volunteer teachers in its first week to about 1,300 students aged 7 to 35 and more than 500 volunteer teachers, mostly Persian-speaking and based in Iran, by December 2021. Classes, held via Skype, Zoom and Telegram, covered subjects including mathematics, science, politics, economics, astronomy, music, art, sculpture, and 17 languages, alongside compulsory critical-thinking lessons. The school also enrolled around 60 male students in Afghanistan and among Afghan refugees in Iran, and arranged volunteer therapists to support students facing hardships such as poverty and forced marriage. Its motto is "the pen instead of the gun".

She later established Afghanistan Education Action (AEA), a UK-based charity. AEA provides educational resources and access to quality education, empowering Afghan girls and women despite ongoing challenges.

In 2021, she was recognized by the BBC as one of their 100 Women.
