= Angela Russell =

Angela Russell may refer to:

- Angela Russell (swimmer) (born 1967), Australian swimmer
- Angela Russell (politician) (born 1943), American politician and civil rights activist
- Angela Russell (doctor) (1893–1991), Irish physician and social reformer
