= Psychotoxic =

2004 first-person shooter video game

- Developer: NuClearVision Entertainment
- Publishers: GER/AUT/RU: Vidis; WW: Whiptail Interactive
- Engine: Vision
- Platform: Microsoft Windows
- Release: GER: September 3, 2004; EU: February 25, 2005; NA: March 14, 2005
- Genre: First-person shooter
- Mode: Single-player

Psychotoxic is a 2004 first-person shooter video game for Microsoft Windows developed by NuClearVision Entertainment and published by Vidis and Whiptail Interactive.set in 2022 the game follows Angela Prophet, a protagonist navigating dystopian landscapes and surreal dream worlds. Tasked with eliminating threats that blur the line between reality and illusion, she battles enemies across cyber-futuristic settings and dark psychological realms. As she uncovers hidden animosities, Angela must harness her unique abilities to survive intense firefights, uncover secrets, and confront overwhelming dangers.

== Development ==
The game's development began in 2001 and was to be published by CDV Software. CDV abandoned the project and was picked up by Vidis for Germany, Austria and Russia and later by Whiptail Interactive for the rest of the world.

== Reception ==
Reception

Aggregate score
Aggregator	Score
Metacritic	40/100

Review scores
Publication	Score
4Players	70%
Computer Games Magazine	2/5
Computer Gaming World	1.5/5
GameSpot	4.1/10
GameSpy	1.5/5
IGN	5/10
MeriStation	5.5/10
PC Format	25%
PC Gamer (US)	15%
PC Zone	35%

The game received "unfavorable" reviews according to the review aggregation website Metacritic.
