= Angela Karp =

Agricultural scientist

Professor Angela Karp is an agricultural scientist with over 35 years experience in crop genetics and breeding. She was the Director and CEO of Rothamsted Research from 2020-2025. She has authored over 135 peer-review publications and co-authored a book on crop genetics.

Angela completed her PhD in Agricultural Botany at the University of Wales, Aberystwyth in 1981. Since 2019 she has been instrumental in the launch of the new SHAKE Climate Change entrepreneurship programme.

== Publications ==
=== Books ===
- editor of Karp A. Molecular tools in plant genetic resources conservation: a guide to the technologies. Bioversity International; 1997 (According to Google Scholar, it has been cited 548 times.)
- co-editor of Karp, A., Peter G. Isaac, and David S. Ingram. Molecular Tools for Screening Biodiversity: Plants and Animals. Dordrecht: Kluwer Academic Publishers, 2001. (According to Google Scholar, this book has been cited 286 times
- co-author of Halford, Nigel G., and A. Karp. Energy Crops. London: Royal Society of Chemistry, 2010.

=== Most cited articles ===
- Karp A, Shield I. Bioenergy from plants and the sustainable yield challenge. New Phytologist. 2008 Jul;179(1):15-32. According to Google Scholar, it has been cited 534 times.
- Karp A, Seberg OL, Buiatti M. Molecular techniques in the assessment of botanical diversity. Annals of Botany. 1996 Aug 1;78(2):143-9. According to Google Scholar, this article has been cited 426 times
- Karp A. Somaclonal variation as a tool for crop improvement. Euphytica. 1995 Feb;85(1):295-302. According to Google Scholar, this article has been cited 396 times
- Karp A, Edwards KJ, Bruford M, Funk S, Vosman B, Morgante M, Seberg O, Kremer A, Boursot P, Arctander P, Tautz D. Molecular technologies for biodiversity evaluation: opportunities and challenges. Nature biotechnology. 1997 Jul;15(7):625-8. According to Google Scholar, this article has been cited 265 times

== Awards and honours ==
- Agricultural Society of England Research Medal - 2007
- Alfred-Toepfer Prize - 2008
