= Ángela González Tort =

Ángela González Tort (1879 - 24 February 1946) was a Cuban guerrilla during the conflicts between the Cuban independence movement and the Spanish government until the island's independence after the Spanish–American War. She was a heroine for independence in the Cuban collective imagination.

== Biography ==
González Tort was born in Fray Benito, Holguín in 1879. At the age of sixteen she joined the Cuban insurrectionary war against the authority of the Spanish colonial government. She was also an active mambisa fighter, nurse and standard-bearer, named by Colonel Remigio Marrero Álvarez as the bearer of the tricolor banner of the independence forces in the region. Shortly after she was married, her husband was taken prisoner and González Tort would try to save him from death by firing squad ordered by the Spanish authorities.3 To prevent his death, she relied on influential friends in the region, including the wife of General Emilio March García, the military chief of the Holguín District, to finally achieve that General Ramón Blanco y Erenas released the prisoner. Shortly afterwards, the couple rejoined the island's independence struggle.

Some of her children died of illness in the fields while participating in the Cuban insurrection. Her husband died shortly afterwards in a skirmish against the Spanish Army.

González Tort survived the war to see the independence of Cuba from the government of Spain and after that she died without honors or recognition on 24 February 1946.
