= Angela Tucker =

American writer, director, and producer

Angela Lynn Tucker
- Born: 10 August
- Occupations: Director; writer; producer
- Years active: 2003–present

Angela Lynn Tucker is an American writer, and Emmy and Webby award winning producer/director. She is best known for her work on Black Folk Don't, (A)sexual and All Styles.

== Life and career ==
Tucker graduated from Wesleyan University with a BA, and from Columbia University with an MFA. She was a Sundance Institute Women Filmmakers Initiative fellow. She has received grants from the MacArthur Foundation, the Ford Foundation, Tribeca All Access and the Brooklyn Arts Council. She was awarded an Artist Residency at Yaddo in Saratoga Springs.

Tucker was the Director of Production at Big Mouth Films, a social issue documentary production company. In 2010, Tucker left Big Mouth Productions to focus on her own film production company, TuckerGurl Inc. Her directorial debut under her own company was the feature documentary, (A)sexual, about people who experience no sexual attraction, premiered at Frameline Film Festival. In 2013, she directed and produced the documentary series, Black Folk Don't, featured in Time Magazine's “10 Ideas That Are Changing Your Life”.

Tucker's directorial debut feature film, All Styles, starring Dushaunt Fik-Shun Stegall and Heather Morris, premiered on Showtime. In 2018, she directed a short film, All Skinfolk, Ain’t Kinfolk, premiered at Doc NYC. She is also slated to direct the upcoming feature film, Paper Chase.

== Filmography ==
Year	Title	Writer	Director	Producer	Notes
2003	Conversations with Id	✗	✓	✗	Short Film
2004	Shook	✗	✗	✓	Short Film
2005	The Birthday Girl	✓	✓	✗	Short Film
2008	Invisible Men: Greg's Story	✗	✓	✗	Documentary short
2008	Invisible Men: Andrew's Story	✗	✓	✗	Documentary short
2008	Afropop: The Ultimate Cultural Exchange	✗	✗	✓	Documentary
2009	No Family History	✗	✗	✓	Documentary
2010	Dreaming Nicaragua	✗	✗	✓	Documentary
2010	Pushing the Elephant	✗	✗	✓	Documentary
2011	(A)sexual	✗	✓	✗	Documentary
2013	The New Black	✗	✗	✓	Documentary
2014	Just the Three of Us	✓	✓	✗	Short film
2015	New Orleans, Here and Now	✗	✓	✗	TV series
2015	Independent Lens	✗	✗	✓	TV series; 2 episodes
2013-2016	Black Folk Don't	✗	✓	✓	TV series; 10 episodes
2017	Intersection	✓	✓	✗	Short film
2018	All Styles	✓	✓	✗	Feature Film
2018	All Skinfolk Ain't Kinfolk	✗	✓	✗	Short Film
2020	Paper Chase	✓	✓	✗	(pre-production)
