= Angela Lampe =

German art historian and curator

Angela Lampe is a German art historian, curator at the Centre Pompidou.

== Career ==
Originally from Germany, she studied art history at Paris 1 Panthéon-Sorbonne University. After completing her thesis in 1999, she was appointed curator at the Kunsthalle Bielefeld in Germany, where she organized several exhibitions.

She was appointed Curator of Modern Art at the Centre Pompidou in 2005.

She has curated numerous exhibitions, among others Chagall et l'avant-garde russe at the Museum of Grenoble (2011) Vues d’en haut at the Centre Pompidou-Metz (2013), Paul Klee: L’ironie à l’œuvre (2016) and Chagall, Lissitzky, Malevich: The Russian Avant-Garde in Vitebsk, 1918-1922 (2018) at the Centre Pompidou (2018) and the Jewish Museum (Manhattan).

== Publications (selection) ==
- Die unheimliche Frau, Bielefeld: Kunsthalle Bielefeld, 2001 ISBN 978-3926318121
- Vues d'en haut, Metz: Centre Pompidou-Metz, 2013 ISBN 978-2359830255
- Robert Delaunay, rythmes sans fin, Paris: Centre Pompidou, 2016 ISBN 978-2844266828
- Paul Klee, L'ironie à l'oeuvre, Paris: Centre Pompidou, 2016 ISBN 978-2-84426-725-2
