= Angela White (disambiguation) =

Angela White (born 1985) is an Australian pornographic actress.

Angela White may also refer to:

- Angela White (athlete) (born 1974), Australian athlete
- Blac Chyna (born 1988), American model and entrepreneur, born as Angela White
- Angela Whyte (born 1980), Canadian athlete
- Dagmar Braun Celeste (born 1941), ordained under the pseudonym "Angela White" as one of the Danube Seven
- Angela White, widow of Ceylonese athlete Duncan White
- Angie White, musician in Parker Trio
