= Angela Chen =

Chinese businesswoman

Angela Chen (Xiao Yan Chen) is a Chinese businesswoman and the chairperson of the United States arm of the nonprofit cultural-exchange group China Arts Foundation.
