= Angela Wakefield =

British fine artist (born 1978)

Angela Wakefield (born 1978) is a contemporary British fine artist from Lancashire, England.

== Early life ==
Wakefield was brought up in Accrington, Lancashire. Wakefield struggled with undiagnosed dyslexia throughout her childhood and early academic career. At the age of 13, she decided to become a professional painter after successfully rendering Vincent Van Gogh's The Sunflowers. She studied a B-Tech National Diploma in Art at Blackburn College before completing a Bachelor of Arts Degree at the University of Central Lancashire. The university recognised Wakefield's dyslexia and she was granted support and assistive technology. Throughout her university years, Wakefield supported herself through freelance graphic design work.

== Career ==
Wakefield uses acrylics and diluted acrylics in a style heavily influenced by film noir and the work of American realist Edward Hopper. Her first collection depicted the urban landscape of her hometown, Accrington, Lancashire. Since then her work has documented urban landscapes throughout modern Britain during an era of urban regeneration. The contrast between the old and the new is conveyed by the juxtaposition between her abstract arrangements and calming expressionism.

Wakefield's early work depicted British cities and the people who live in them with a sense of voyeuristic detachment. In 2012 she transposed this method of interpretation to the topic of New York. The result was her New York Series which depicted the iconic New York imagery and conveyed the lives of the city's inhabitants in a distant emotionally detached way. The collection showed a departure from the impressionism of her earlier works and a move towards proportional realism. The subject matter itself exuded a cinematic quality not seen in her previous works. The artist attributed this more worldly and considered approach to becoming a mother. She also claims her dyslexia has had a profound impact on how she perceives the world and arranges her compositions. The same year (2012), her painting No.19 from the New York Series, appeared on the cover of British art magazine: Art of England. The cover caught the attention of British film director Danny Boyle and was chosen by Fox Searchlight Pictures to appear in Boyle's 2013 movie, Trance.

In recent years her paintings have been commissioned by British media executive Greg Dyke and Stonyhurst College. Stonyhurst presented Wakefield's painting of the college to HRH Princess Anne.

Today influential art collectors and critics such as Ian Welland and David Latham regard her as one of Britain's foremost contemporary urban landscape painters.

=== Book jackets and magazine covers ===
- Grant Tracey; Final Stanzas, Twelve Winters Press, 2015.
- Art of England, Issue 70, June 2010, pmb media ltd.
