= Angela Sasse =

German commputer scientist and information security expert

Martina Angela Sasse FREng is a German psychologist whose research spans the areas of human–computer interaction and computer security. She is Horst Görtz Endowed Professor of Human-Centred Security at Ruhr University Bochum. and has a part-time position as Professor of Human-Centred Technology at University College London.

== Education and career ==
Sasse did her undergraduate studies in psychology at the University of Wuppertal, and has a master's degree in occupational psychology from the University of Sheffield and a doctorate from the University of Birmingham.

She joined University College London as a lecturer in 1990, and became Professor of Human-Centred Technology there in 2003. She founded the Research Institute in Science of Cyber Security (RISCS) in 2012. She moved to Ruhr University Bochum as Horst Görtz Endowed Professor of Human-Centred Security in 2018.

== Recognition ==
Sasse was named a Fellow of the Royal Academy of Engineering in 2015, for "demonstrating the impact of human security behaviour, and developing a socio-technical approach for modelling and managing that behaviour effectively". She was elected to the German National Academy of Sciences Leopoldina in 2023.
