= Angela Lorenz =

American book artist

- Born: Angela Stone; 1965 (age 60–61) near Boston, Massachusetts
- Education: Brown University
- Known for: Book arts

Angela Lorenz (born 1965) is an American book artist. Lorenz was born near Boston, Massachusetts. She graduated from Brown University with a bachelor's degree in Fine Art and Semiotics in 1987. She lives and works most of the year in Bologna, Italy.

Examples of her work are included in the collections of the Smithsonian American Art Museum, the Boston Public Library, the Metropolitan Museum of Art, the Clark Art Institute, the National Gallery of Art, and the Mildred Lane Kemper Art Museum.
