= Angela Peñaherrera =

Ecuadorian actress, television producer, and guitarist

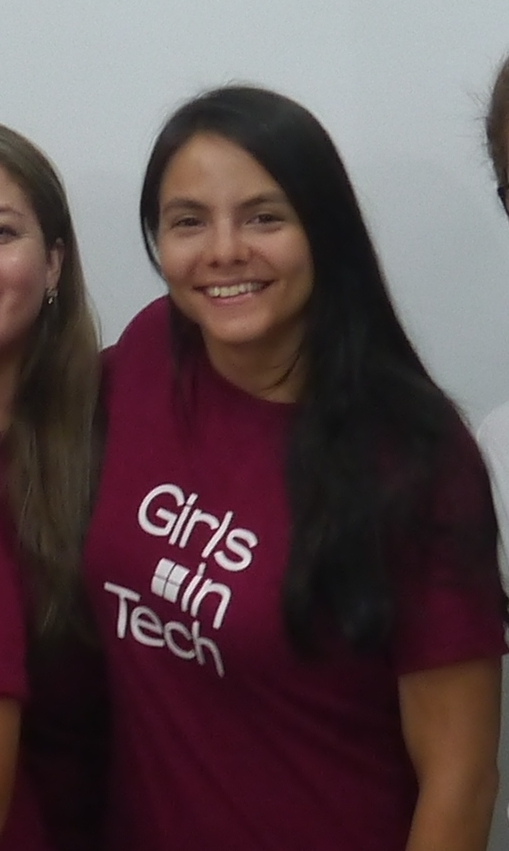
- Born: Angela Isadora Peñaherrera Jácome; 16 July 1985 (age 40)
- Occupations: Actress, television producer, guitarist

Angela Isadora Peñaherrera Jácome (born 16 July 1985) is an Ecuadorian actress, television producer, and guitarist.

== Biography ==
Angela Peñaherrera was born on 16 July 1985 to muralist and photographer Fabián Peñaherrera and ballet dancer María Inés Jácome. She completed her primary studies via Montessori education and then studied at Torrance High School in Torrance, California.

Peñaherrera has been in the Ecuadorian independent music scene 2006. She was a founding member of the all-female punk band The Cassettes and is currently a member of Guayaquil-based indie rock band Moshi Moshi. Her first appearance in cinema was in the Ecuadorian film Without Summer, Without Autumn by Iván Mora Manzano, playing as Paula, a girl searching for the meaning of happiness.
