= Angela J. Reddock =

American lawyer

- Born: 1969 (age 56–57); Los Angeles, California, U.S.
- Occupations: Attorney specializing in employment and labor and workplace law and human resources consulting

Angela J. Reddock (born 1969) is an American employment and labor and workplace attorney in Los Angeles, California.

== Early years ==
Reddock's father was in the military, and she was born in Germany before moving to her parents' hometown of Birmingham, Alabama at the age of 2. It was the 1970s in post-civil rights Alabama, and her grandmother, a convalescent home worker and organizer with a nurses' union, often took Reddock to demonstrations. It was then that Reddock first developed an interest in civic and social engagement.

Reddock was nine when her family moved to Compton, California. There, she would travel across town to Brentwood, where she attended private school at the Brentwood School. It was a long commute – even by Los Angeles standards – but the drive showed her the many different faces of the area.

As a teen, Reddock thrived while navigating the different worlds of Compton and Brentwood. After high school, Reddock went to Amherst College in Massachusetts and studied abroad at Oxford University, St. Catherine's College in Oxford, England. Following college, she was a fellow with the Coro Foundation program in public policy and public affairs in Los Angeles. Thereafter, she attended law school at UCLA School of Law.

== Legal career and public service ==
Reddock is a noted employment and labor law attorney, and is the Managing Partner of the Reddock Law Group based in Los Angeles, California. She was a partner with the noted California law firm Carroll, Burdick & McDonough, LLP and was co-chair of the firm's Employment Litigation and Counseling Group. She also was an associate with the national employment and labor law firm Jackson Lewis.

Reddock has been actively engaged in state and local government for more than 20 years. She got her start in politics running for the Los Angeles City Council, District 11 in 2005. At the time, the district was nearly 60% white and had relatively few black voters. Challenging the notion that a minority candidate could not run in a non-minority district, Reddock surprised many by garnering more than 14% of the votes, thereby establishing a name for herself in Los Angeles politics.

Reddock served as a member of the Board of Trustees of the Los Angeles Community College District for two years. She was appointed to the board in April 2007, replacing former member Michael Waxman. The Los Angeles Community College District has nine campuses in the 36 cities of Los Angeles County. The eight-member, non-partisan Board of Trustees guides policies and oversees the operations of the district's $600 million budget and curriculum standards.

As a member of the Board of Trustees, Reddock was a leader in helping pass Measure J, a $3.5 billion bond measure that will allow the Los Angeles Community College District to continue to rebuild and renovate its nine colleges to 21st-century green and sustainable standards. Reddock also has challenged proposed cuts to community college funding and proposed increases in student fees in the California state budget.

Reddock has held several board chairmanships, including chair for the Los Angeles African American Women's Public Policy Institute (LAAAWPPI), an organization which trains women to become more engaged in public policy and public affairs, and Ability First, an organization which provides services to individuals with disabilities. Reddock also serves as a Commissioner on the Los Angeles City Transportation Commission and the Los Angeles County Local Government Services Reform Commission, where she is chair of the Taxicab Taskforce. Previously, she was a Commissioner on the Los Angeles County Small Business Development Commission and a member of the State Board of Barbering and Cosmetology.

Reddock is a published author and legal commentator. Her published works include How to Survive Your First Job (Special Editor) and Inside the Minds: Labor & Employment Client Strategies. She also serves as a legal commentator for KFWB "Turning Point Business Minute" and for KCAL-9 and KCBS-2 television.

== Personal ==
Reddock resides in the Los Angeles area.
