= Angela Jackson (disambiguation) =

Angela Jackson is an American poet, playwright, and novelist.

Angela Jackson may also refer to:

- Angela Jackson (writer), British historian and writer
- Angela Jackson (basketball), women's basketball coach
