= Angela McGregor =

Rugby union career
- Position: Fullback
Amateur team(s)
Years	Team	Apps	(Points)
	College Rifles		(0)
Provincial / State sides
Years	Team	Apps	(Points)
2007, 2009	Auckland	13	(30)
National sevens team
Years	Team		Comps
2009	New Zealand		2009 RWCS

Angela McGregor is a former New Zealand rugby sevens player. She represented New Zealand at the 2009 Rugby World Cup Sevens in Dubai.

McGregor was named in the Black Ferns sevens Development Squad for the 2001 International Women's Sevens Tournament at Upper Hutt.

In 2008, she was selected in a squad of 29 players for a three-day trial camp. It was to select the final squad for a qualifying tournament in Samoa.
