= Angela Clarke =

Angela Clarke may refer to:

- Angela Clarke (American actress) (1909–2010), stage, television and film performer
- Angela Clarke (English actress) (born 1969), television performer and screenwriter
- Angela Clarke, Canadian curator at Italian Cultural Centre Vancouver, active since 1990s
- Angela Clarke (volleyball) (born 1975), Australian Olympian in 2000
- Angela Clarke (author) (born 1980 / 1981), English columnist, playwright and novelist

== See also ==
- Angela Clark, Zimbabwean competitor in Diving at the 1994 Commonwealth Games as well as 1998
