= Angela Mariotto =

Statistician

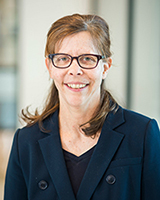
- Mariotto in 2017
- Born: Angela Bacelar Mariotto
- Education: Imperial College London
- Scientific career
- Fields: Statistics
- Workplaces: Istituto Superiore di Sanità; National Cancer Institute
- Thesis: Empirical Bayes inference and the linear model (1989)
- Doctoral advisor: David Cox

Angela Bacelar Mariotto is a statistician who researches the development and improvement of cancer progress measures. She is chief of the data analytics branch at the National Cancer Institute. Mariotto was a researcher at the Istituto Superiore di Sanità.

== Education ==
Mariotto received her Doctor of Philosophy in Statistics from the Imperial College London. Her 1988 thesis was titled Empirical Bayes inference and the linear model. Mariotto's doctoral advisor was David Cox.

== Career ==
Mariotto worked at the Istituto Superiore di Sanità for a decade. She joined the National Cancer Institute (NCI) in November 1999. Mariotto is the chief of the data analytics branch (DAB) of the surveillance research program (SRP) within the division of cancer control and population sciences (DCCPS) at NCI.

== Works ==
Mariotto's research interests include development and improvement of cancer progress measures, in particular survival, prevalence, quality of life, utilization, and cost measures. Her other areas of expertise include the development and application of models to predict incidence and prevalence from cancer survival and mortality data, and models for survival projections.

Mariotto has also contributed to research on predicting future cancer cases in the United States. Her work uses statistical models to better understand cancer trends and survival rates. These studies help researchers and public health officials plan for future cancer care needs.

She is the NCI scientific coordinator of the prostate cancer working groups in the Cancer Intervention and Surveillance Network (CISNET) cooperative agreement, for which she coordinates research activities of three grantees who are investigating questions related to the impact of screening and treatment interventions on prostate cancer mortality trends.

Mariotto is also responsible for developing new prevalence measures and for reporting the new cancer prevalence statistics to the nation each year. At NCI, Mariotto's duties include management of grants, independent research, and service duties, including helping to disseminate cancer statistics to the general public.
