= Angela Webster =

Clinical epidemiologist

Professor Angela Webster FAHMS

Personal details
- Occupation: Epidemiologist, nephrologist

Angela Webster is a clinical epidemiologist at the Sydney School of Public Health, University of Sydney, nephrologist and transplant physician at Westmead Hospital and director of Evidence Integration at the NHMRC Clinical Trials Centre, University of Sydney.

== Biography ==
Webster is a clinical academic with a focus on transplant medicine, kidney disease and epidemiology.

Webster's research themes include multimorbidity and the interaction of chronic diseases, specifically kidney disease, cancer, cardiovascular disease, diabetes, infection, and mental illness, addressed through evidence integration. Her researched is focused on improving clinical outcomes and using data to improve clinical decision making, by communicating and evaluating risk. She has a particular interest in health inequalities and mitigating factors that create disadvantage in health and healthcare settings.

== Select publications ==
Year	Title	Journal	Ref
2017	Chronic Kidney Disease	The Lancet	
2021	Sex differences in mortality among binational cohort of people with chronic kidney disease: population based data linkage study	BMJ	
2016	Cognition in chronic kidney disease: a systematic review and meta-analysis	Biomed Central Medicine.	
2015	Readability of Written Materials for CKD Patients: A Systematic Review.	American Journal of Kidney Diseases	
2021	Supporting patients to be involved in decisions about their health and care: Development of a best practice health literacy App for Australian adults living with Chronic Kidney Disease.	Health Promotion Journal of Australia	
2019	Residual risk of infection with blood-borne viruses in potential organ donors at increased risk of infection: systematic review and meta-analysis.	Medical Journal of Australia	
2014	Survival after cutaneous melanoma in kidney transplant recipients: a population-based matched cohort study	American Journal of Transplantation	
2021	The landscape of COVID-19 trials in Australia	Medical Journal of Australia.	
2022	Searching clinical trials registers: guide for systematic reviewers.	BMJ	
2013	Interventions for smoking cessation and reduction in individuals with schizophrenia	Cochrane Database of Systematic Reviews	

== Awards ==
Year	Award	Organisation	Ref
2023	Elected as Fellow of the Australian Academy of Health and Medical Sciences	Australian Academy of Health and Medical Sciences	
2020	TJ Neale Award for Outstanding Contribution to Nephrological Science	Australian and New Zealand Society of Nephrology	
2019	Josette Eris Memorial Award for emerging female leaders	Transplantation Society of Australia and New Zealand	
2015	Ian McKenzie Prize for outstanding contribution in transplantation	Transplantation Society of Australia and New Zealand	
