= Angela (singer) =

- Born: Alyona Viktorivna Mykolaychuk; 18 January 1991 (age 35); Zhytomyr, Ukraine
- Genres: Pop
- Occupations: singer; model
- Instrument: Vocals

Alyona Viktorivna Mykolaychuk (born January 18, 1991, in Zhytomyr), known under the stage name Angela, is a Ukrainian singer and model. She has won beauty contests, including Ms Top Ukraine 2023.

== Biography ==
She was born on January 18, 1991, in Zhytomyr. She graduated from the music school in Zhytomyr, majoring in piano and accordion. She is a graduate of the "Sonechko" school of choreographic art. She studied at the English-oriented gymnasium No. 3. In 2008, she entered the Zhytomyr State Technological University, Faculty of Finance and Credit. In 2012, she graduated from the university and moved to Kyiv. In 2014, she graduated from the Taras Shevchenko National University of Kyiv.

In 2016, she released her debut track "I'll Be There". She first appeared on the catwalk as a singing model, styled as an angel in white. This inspired her stage name of Angela, and after a while the concert show "Angela Show" appeared.

The singer has since released several singles, the most popular of them: "Your Eyes", ‘Let Go’, "In the Original", "Cold City", "Call Me Back", "In love" and "Don't offend me".

She has also done volunteer and philanthropic work.

== Singles ==
- I'll be there for you (2016)
- I don't know (2016)
- I'm not for you (2017)
- Angel (2018)
- No one can (2019)
- The only one (2019)
- Tones like ice (2019)
- Your eyes (2019)
- Let go (2023)
- In the original (2023)
- New Year (2023)
- Cold City (2024)
- Chimes (2024)

== Awards and prizes ==
Laureate of Ukrainian orders and awards:

- Order "For Civil Valor"

== Personal life ==
Angela is in a relationship with Ozan Su. She has two sons.
