= Angela Correll =

American author

Angela Correll is an American author, creative, and entrepreneur. She is the co-founder of The Stanford, a suite of hospitality businesses located in the second oldest city in Kentucky.

== Education ==
Angela has a bachelor's degree in communication from Georgetown College in Georgetown, Kentucky, and a master's degree in library and information science from the University of Kentucky.

== Personal life ==
Angela lives on a farm in Central Kentucky with her entrepreneur husband, Jess.

== Career ==
Angela is the author of the Village Life, Restored in Tuscany, and "May Hollow Trilogy", which includes books Grounded, Guarded, and Granted. All three books were adapted into plays for Danville, Kentucky's Pioneer Playhouse. Grounded was adapted into a film titled Grounded in Love. Grounded in Love premiered on August 7, 2025, on Great American Pure Flix, and September 27, 2025, on the Great American Family channel.

Angela and her husband Jess together co-founded The Stanford, a suite of hospitality businesses on Main Street in Stanford, Kentucky. The Stanford includes Kentucky Soaps & Such a goat milk soap factory and retail shop in Stanford, The Stanford Inn at Wilderness Road, Mama DeVechio's Pizzeria and the Bluebird, a farm-to-table restaurant.

== Awards ==
Restored in Tuscany, Bronze Medal in Personal Development / Growth, Living Now Book Awards, 2025

Grounded, became an Amazon bestseller in 2014 in various categories of inspirational fiction. Grounded, the audiobook, was a finalist for the Audie Award in Inspirational Fiction for 2015, and was nominated for Best Voiceover by the Society For Voice Arts and Sciences in the category of Audiobook Narration – Inspirational/Faith-Based Fiction.

Granted was awarded the silver medal in Religious Fiction in the 2019 Independent Publisher Book Awards.

Preservation Kentucky, Bruckheimer Award for Historic Preservation in a Rural Community, 2013.

Boyle Landmark Trust Preservation Award, 2014

Bluegrass Trust for Historic Preservation, Barbara Hulette Award, 2014
