= Angela Musiimenta =

Ugandan scientist

- Education: Mbarara University of Science and Technology; University of Leeds; University of Manchester
- Occupation: scientist
- Awards: 1. German-African Innovation Incentive Award

Angela Musiimenta is a Ugandan scientist. She won the first German-African Innovation Incentive Award.

== Education ==
Musiimenta acquired a Bachelor of Science degree from Mbarara University of Science and Technology. She later pursued a master of science degree in Information Systems at the University of Leeds. Musiimenta currently holds a PhD in health informatics from the University of Manchester.She also received advanced professional training from institutions including Harvard Medical School, McGill University, Brown International Advanced Research Institutes (BIARI), and the U.S. National Institutes of Health.

== Career ==
Dr. Musiimenta has built a distinguished academic and research career:

- Joined Mbarara University of Science and Technology as a teaching assistant in 2003 and later became a lecturer after completing her Master's degree.
- Served as Head of the Department of Information Technology at MUST.
- Served as Deputy Dean, Faculty of Computing and Informatics at MUST.
- Appointed Chief Research Officer (CRO) of the newly established Research Institute in 2026, where she oversees research strategy, grants and partnerships.

== Awards and Recognition ==
- German-African Innovation Incentive Award, becoming the first recipient for her innovative work in digital health.
- Recognition as an internationally respected researcher with more than 50 peer-reviewed publications and over 1,000 scholarly citations.
