= Angela Narth =

Canadian writer

- Occupation: Author
- Writing career
- Genre: Children's Literature

Angela Narth is a Canadian writer and freelance literary reviewer. She is best known for her work in children's fiction.

== Biography ==
Angela Narth was born in Sudbury, Ontario to the late Joseph and Selina (Ena) LeBlanc and was raised in Québec until she moved west at the age of 23. She is an actress and writer. Her acting credits include a wide range of roles in both television and film. She writes fiction as Angela K. Narth, and has also published non-fiction under the pseudonym Angela Murphy. She has a Master's Degree in Educational Psychology from the University of Ottawa and a bachelor's degree in Special Education and Anthropology from the University of British Columbia.

Following successive careers as teacher, school administrator, and university lecturer, Angela wrote her first children's book Simon With Two Left Feet, which was published in 2000. Widely celebrated, the book was on the best-seller list for 47 consecutive weeks. It was short-listed for the McNally Robinson Book of the Year for Young People in 2001, and received a Bronze International Moonbeam Award for Children's Fiction in 2007. Simon With Two Left Feet has been re-written as a play for children and was presented for the first time by Fantasy Theatre for Children March 28 through April 5, 2009 at the Forrest Nickerson Theatre in Winnipeg.

The Very Last Ladybug War was published in 2001 along with its French-language version La toute derniere guerre de coccinelle. Fergus Prince of Frogs followed in 2003 and was short-listed for the McNally Robinson Book of the Year for Young People in that year. Her English-language children's books, published by GWEV Publishing, have been re-created in Picture-mation by Cinerio Entertainment and are available on DVD as well as in print form.

In 2005, Folklore Publishing of Edmonton published three of Angela's adult non-fiction books, Canadian Crimes & Capers, Great Canadians, and The Bathroom Book of Canadian Trivia under her pseudonym Angela Murphy.
