= Angela Fitzgerald =

American educator and television presenter

- Occupations: Television presenter, educator
- Television: Wisconsin Life

Academic work
- Discipline: Psychology
- Institutions: Madison Area Technical College psychology faculty

Angela Fitzgerald is an American educator and television presenter. Fitzgerald is the current host of Wisconsin Life which airs on PBS Wisconsin.

== Early life ==
Fitzgerald resides in Madison, Wisconsin. Fitzgerald is a member of the Madison Area Technical College Psychology faculty, as well as a professional financial educator with Summit Credit Union. Her work in financial literacy led her to found Brown Girl, Green Money, a social network of women of color working to support the achievement and pursuit of finance goals. Fitzgerald enjoys travel and storytelling. In the past, Fitzgerald worked as the Emerging Initiatives and Volunteer Coordinator for Justified Anger and the Center for Urban Leadership Development in Madison.

=== Television ===
- Wisconsin Life (2017–present)
