= Angela Codazzi =

Italian geographer (1890–1972)

Angela Codazzi (1890–1972) was an Italian geographer and cartographer whose work included research into the sixteenth-century Arab geographer Leo Africanus. She contributed 22 biographies of cartographers and geographers to the Dizionario Biografico degli Italiani.

== Biography ==
Angela Codazzi was raised in Milan. She attended the Liceo Farini in that city, then the Faculty of Letters at the Accademia Scientifico-Letteraria there, which in 1924 would become the University of Studies. After graduation, she taught literary subjects in secondary schools even as she volunteered as an assistant at the University of Studies of Milan where she began her teaching and research activity on medieval geographical maps and Arabic manuscripts on geographical subjects. At first she worked under the direction of professors Luigi De Magistris, then of Aldo Sestini.

In 1924, Giuseppe Ricchieri appointed her to a University position as an assistant for the Cabinet of Geography, charged with collecting and keeping the teaching material in order.

From 1937, Codazzi was listed as assistant for exercises and in 1946–1947 she was entrusted with the teaching of geography, a position that had remained vacant, together with collaborating on the direction of the Institute, On 12 January 1949, at the age of 59, Codazzi was officially granted the title of professor and she stayed in the Faculty of Letters of the State University until 1969. In addition to geography, she taught the history of geography and the Arabic language. Gaetano Ferro described her research as consisting of "notable scientific value" and dedicated to historical-geographical and historical-cartographic themes.

Her innovative research on the almost forgotten 16th-century Arab geographer Leo Africanus has been cited in dozens of scientific works. Her research has also appeared in numerous volumes that were left as a donation to the Institute of Geography of the University of Milan and constituted the "Codazzi Collection."

Her biographies of geographers and cartographers were published in the Dizionario Biografico degli Italiani and included Francesco Berlinghieri, Andrea Bianco, Stefano Bonsignori and Gabriele Bertazzolo.

With the death of Angela Codazzi in 1972, Aldo Sestini wrote, "a singular figure of the Italian geographical world has disappeared, further thinning the small group of those interested in the history of geography and cartography."

== Selected works ==
- Beltrami, Luca, and Angela Codazzi. Eugenio Griffini Bey (1878-1925). Tip. Umberto Allegretti, 1926.
- Codazzi, Angela. Le edizioni quattrocentesche e cinquecentesche della" Geografia" di Tolomeo. La Goliardica-Edizioni Universitarie, 1949.
- Skelton, R. A., and Angela Codazzi. "International geographical congress, Lisbon, 1949." (1949): 93-95.
- Codazzi, Angela. "The contribution of Roberto Almagià to the history of cartography." (1964): 78-80.
- Codazzi, Angela. "Una" descrizione" del Cairo di Guglielmo Postel." Studi in Onore di Cesare Manaresi. Milano (1952): 169-206.
- Codazzi, Angela. Storia delle carte geografiche da Anassimandro alla rinascita di Tolomeo nel sec. XV. Univ. degli studi di Milano, Fac. di lettere e filosofia, 1959.
