= Angela McCarthy =

New Zealand history academic

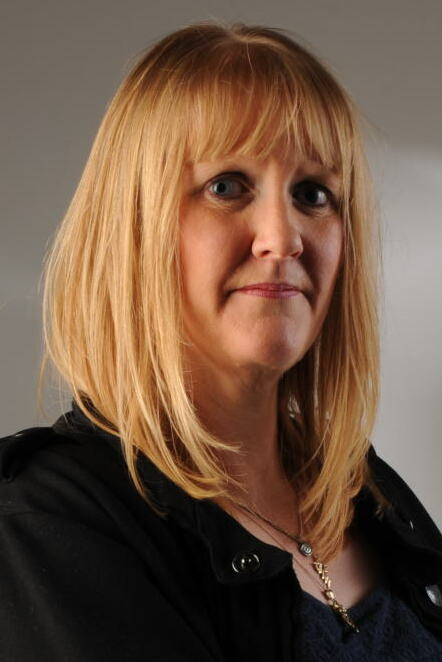
- McCarthy in 2012
- Education: Trinity College Dublin
- Scientific career
- Fields: Irish and Scottish migrations
- Workplaces: University of Otago
- Thesis: 'Seas may divide' : Irish migration to New Zealand as portrayed in personal correspondence, 1840–1937 (2000)

Angela Hannah McCarthy is a New Zealand history academic, and as of 2018 is a full professor at the University of Otago.

== Academic career ==
After a PhD titled 'Seas may divide' : Irish migration to New Zealand as portrayed in personal correspondence, 1840–1937 at Trinity College Dublin, she moved to the University of Otago, rising to full professor. In 2008 McCarthy received $612,000 in Marsden grant funding.

== Books ==
McCarthy is the author of books including:

- McCarthy, Angela. Irish Migrants in New Zealand, 1840-1937: the Desired Haven. Vol. 3. Boydell Press, 2005.
- McCarthy, Angela. Personal narratives of Irish and Scottish migration, 1921-65: For spirit and adventure. Oxford University Press, 2017.
- McCarthy, Angela. Scottishness and Irishness in New Zealand since 1840. Manchester University Press, 2011.

Her edited volumes include:

- McCarthy, Angela, ed. A global clan: Scottish migrant networks and identities since the eighteenth century. Vol. 36. IB Tauris, 2006.
- McCarthy, Angela, and MacKenzie, John, eds. Global Migrations: The Scottish Diaspora since 1600. Edinburgh University Press, 2016.
- Leckie, Jacqueline, McCarthy, Angela, and Wanhalla, Angela, eds. Migrant Cross-Cultural Encounters in Asia and the Pacific. Routledge, 2016.
