= Angela Kordež =

Yugoslav cross-country skier

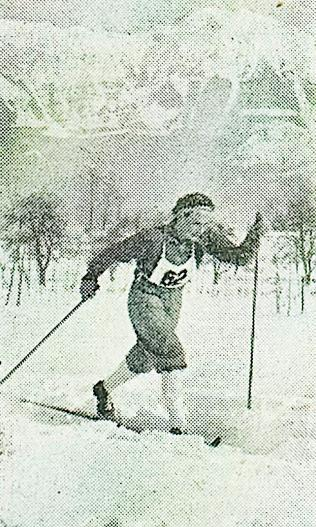
Angela Kordež

Angela Kordež (born May 22, 1926, date of death unknown) was a Yugoslavian cross-country skier during the 1950s. She finished 16th in the 10 km event at the 1952 Winter Olympics in Oslo.
