= Angela Slavova =

Bulgarian applied mathematician

Angela Slavova is a Bulgarian applied mathematician. She heads the Department of Mathematical Physics in the Institute of Mathematics of the Bulgarian Academy of Sciences, and is former chair of the Bulgarian section of the Society for Industrial and Applied Mathematics.

== Education ==
Slavova graduated from the University of Ruse with M.S. in computer engineering in 1986. From 1992 to 1993, she was a Fulbright scholar at the Florida Institute of Technology, but returned to Bulgaria to obtain her Ph.D. in mathematics in 1995 from her alma mater and in 2005 became Doctor of Science at the Institute of Mathematics and Informatics of the Bulgarian Academy of Sciences.

== Career ==
From 2004 to 2011, Slavova was a head of the Department of Mathematical Physics of the Institute of Mathematics at the Bulgarian Academy of Sciences. Since 2007, she has been a full professor at the Institute of Mathematics and Informatics of the Bulgarian Academy of Sciences. Since 2011, she is a head of the Department of Differential Equations and Mathematical Physics at the Institute of Mathematics, Bulgarian Academy of Sciences.

She chaired the Bulgarian section Society for Industrial and Applied Mathematics for 2013–2014.

== Books ==
- Cellular neural networks: dynamics and modelling (Kluwer, 2003}.
- Nonlinear waves: An introduction (World Scientific, 2011)
- Nonlinear waves: A geometrical approach (World Scientific, 2019).
