= Angela King =

Angela King may refer to:

- Angela King (diplomat) (1938–2007), Jamaican diplomat
- Angela King (environmentalist) (born 1944), British co-founder of Common Ground
- Angela King (peace activist) (born 1975), American co-founder of Life After Hate
- Angela King (Ohio politician)
- Angela King (javelin thrower) (born 1951), English javelin thrower
- Angela King-Twitero, professional cheerleading director
