= Angela Dwyer =

Australian social scientist and writer

Associate Professor Dr Angela Dwyer
- Occupations: Sociologist, Academic & Writer
- Title: Associate Professor in Policing

Academic background
- Education: Bachelor of Social Science (Sociology) (Hons), Doctor of Philosophy
- Alma mater: Queensland University of Technology
- Thesis: Teaching girls a lesson: The Fashion Model as Pedagogue (2006)
- Doctoral advisor: Erica McWilliam, Daphne Meadmore

Academic work
- Discipline: Education, Sociology, Policing
- Institutions: Queensland University of Technology (2007-2015), University of Tasmania (2015-)
- Main interests: Crime and Social Justice, Gender, Policing
- Website: Researcher Website

Dr Angela Ellen Dwyer is an Australian social scientist and writer. Her specialist area is policing studies, with a particular interest in how lesbian, gay, bisexual, and transgender young people experience policing.

== Career ==
Dwyer holds a Bachelor of Social Science with Honours (Sociology and Feminist Studies) from Queensland University of Technology (QUT). She completed her PhD at QUT in 2006 and began working the following year as a senior lecturer at the university. Dwyer's research focuses on how sexuality, gender, and sex diversity influences policing.

In 2015 she was appointed as Associate Professor of Policing and Emergency Management at the University of Tasmania. and is a senior researcher at the Tasmanian Institute of Law Enforcement Studies, serving as a member of the Vulnerability, Resilience, and Policing Research Consortium.

Dwyer also holds several Adjunct Professorial roles at the Queensland University of Technology, and with the Centre for Research in Young People’s Texts and Cultures at the University of Winnipeg.

== Select Publications ==
Dwyer has published extensively in the discipline areas including Sociology, Criminology and Gender; with select publicatings including:

- Teaching girls a lesson: the fashion model as pedagogue, Dwyer, A., PhD Thesis, Queensland University of Technology, 2006
- Sex, Crime and Morality, co-written with Hayes, S. and Carpenter, B., Routledge, 2012
- Queering Criminology, co-edited with Ball, M. and Crofts, C., Springer, 2016
- Routledge international handbook of critical policing studies, co-written with Asquith, NL. Rodgers, J. Clover, J. Cordner, G. Ahmed, R., Routledge, 2025
