= Angela Holmes =

British fashion designer (1950–2000)

Angela Mary Holmes (10 July 1950 - 3 November 2000) was a British fashion designer and performer.

== Biography ==
Holmes was born in Darlington and grew up with three siblings on her parents' Yorkshire farm. She started drawing models and dresses at age 13 following the death of her mother. Angela started a market stall in the early 1970s to sell her designs alongside her partner Keith and younger brother Jonathan. They acquired a shop unit in 1973, opening the first Droopy & Browns on Stonegate, York. The business was steadily built over following years until, in 1997, Angela had eight Droopy & Browns shops including in St Martin's Lane, London and Edinburgh.

Holmes has been described as a cult figure. A BBC podcast describes Holmes' style as "maximalist and hedonistic, inspired by historical and theatrical themes". Droopy & Browns, through Angela's design lead, made mid-market clothing in small runs which drew on historical fashions, even if they were not currently fashionable trends.

Holmes was also a singer. In the 1970s she was lead vocalist of Robert Palmer's band The Mandrakes. She toured her own shows in the 1980s titled "Songs Of Whores And Wars" and "Cheap and Potent", performing also at the Assembly Rooms in Edinburgh and Cheltenham literature festival. In 1983 she was the lead in a production of Happy End.
