= Angela Douglas (disambiguation) =

Angela Douglas (born 1940) is an English actress.

Angela Douglas may also refer to:

- Angela E. Douglas (born 1956), British entomologist
- Angela Lynn Douglas (1943–2007), American transgender activist
