= Angela Hall =

New Zealand footballer

Personal information
- Full name: Angela Hall
- Date of birth: 8 October 1958 (age 68)
- Place of birth: New Zealand
- Position: Goalkeeper

International career
Years	Team	Apps	(Gls)
1980–1984	New Zealand	15	(0)

Angela Hall (born 8 October 1958) is a former association football goalkeeper who represented New Zealand at international level.

Hall made her Football Ferns in a 1–1 draw with Australia on 21 May 1980, and finished her international career with 15 caps to her credit.
