= Angela Taylor =

Angela Taylor may refer to:

- Angela Taylor (athlete), American athlete and coach
- Angela Taylor (ice hockey)
- Angela Taylor (basketball)
- Angela Rose Taylor, Australian police officer who died from injuries caused by the Russell Street bombing
- Angella Taylor-Issajenko, Canadian athlete who competed as Angella Taylor for most of her career

== See also ==
- Angie Taylor, member of the Nevada Assembly
