= Ángela Dávila =

Guatemalan footballer

Personal information
- Full name: María de los Ángeles Dávila Bolaños
- Date of birth: 22 December 1996 (age 29)
- Position: Midfielder

Team information
- Current team: Comunicaciones

Senior career*
Years	Team	Apps	(Gls)
- Comunicaciones

International career^{‡}
2019–	Guatemala	2	(0)
- * Club domestic league appearances and goals ‡ National team caps and goals as of 8 October 2019

María de los Ángeles Dávila Bolaños (born 22 December 1996), known as Ángela Dávila, is a Guatemalan footballer who plays as a midfielder for Comunicaciones FC and the Guatemala women's national team.

== Club career ==
Dávila has played in her country for Comunicaciones FC.

== International career ==
Dávila capped for Guatemala at senior level during the 2020 CONCACAF Women's Olympic Qualifying Championship qualification.
