= Angela Koehler =

American biochemist and academic

Angela Nicole Koehler
- Education: Harvard University; Reed College
- Scientific career
- Workplaces: California Institute of Technology; Harvard University; Broad Institute
- Thesis: Small molecule microarrays: A high-throughput tool for discovering protein-small molecule interactions (2003)
- Doctoral advisor: Stuart Schreiber

Angela N. Koehler is an American biochemist who is the Karl Van Tassel (1925) Career Development Professor of Chemical Biology at the Broad Institute. Her research considers the development of chemical tools to understand transcriptional regulation, and the design of next-generation pharmaceuticals.

== Early life and education ==
Koehler was an undergraduate student in biochemistry at Reed College. She worked on structural studies of proteins that recognize nucleic acids, including transfer RNA and DNA. She moved to Harvard University as a doctoral researcher, where she worked alongside Stuart Schreiber on strategies to understand the interactions between proteins and molecules.

== Research and career ==
Koehler joined the chemical biology program at the Broad Institute, where she was made group leader for chemical genetics. Koehler develops time-sensitive chemical tools to understand the dynamics of transcriptional regulation. Before the work of Koehler it was understood that transcription factors were "undruggable", as their inherent structural disorder compromised the binding of small-molecule ligands. Her research looks to develop small-molecule probes that modify proteins, which can, in turn, tune gene expression.

Koehler is on the faculty at the Koch Institute for Integrative Cancer Research. She has founded several companies, including Ligon Discovery, a drug discovery company focused on small-molecule microarrays, Kronos Bio, a cancer therapeutics accelerator and 76Bio, a biotechnology company that looks to develop targeted protein degraders.

== Awards and honors ==
- Genome Technology Young Investigator
- Broad Institute Merkin Fellow
- Novartis Lectureship in Chemistry
- Ono Pharma Breakthrough Science Award
- Fellow of the National Academy of Sciences
- National Science Foundation CAREER Award
- MIT Junior Bose Award for Excellence in Teaching

== Selected publications ==
- Yingwei Mao; Xuecai Ge; Christopher L Frank; et al. (1 March 2009). "Disrupted in schizophrenia 1 regulates neuronal progenitor proliferation via modulation of GSK3beta/beta-catenin signaling". Cell. 136 (6): 1017–1031. doi:10.1016/j.cell.2008.12.044. ISSN 0092-8674. PMC 2704382. PMID 19303846. Wikidata Q24322974.
- Benjamin Z Stanton; Lee F Peng; Nicole Maloof; et al. (March 2009). "A small molecule that binds Hedgehog and blocks its signaling in human cells". Nature Chemical Biology. 5 (3): 154–6. doi:10.1038/nchembio.142. ISSN 1552-4450. PMC 2770933. PMID 19151731. Wikidata Q24646445.
