= Angela Calabrese Barton =

American professor of teacher education

- Born: August 21, 1968 (age 58)

Academic background
- Education: BSc, Chemistry, 1990, University of Notre Dame; PhD, 1995, Michigan State University

Angela Marie Calabrese Barton (born August 21, 1968) is an American professor of teacher education. She is a Full professor at the University of Michigan and co-founder of Green Energy Technology (GET) City program.

== Early life and education ==
Calabrese Barton was born on August 21, 1968. She earned her Bachelor of Science degree in chemistry from the University of Notre Dame in 1990, and her PhD in Curriculum, Teaching and Education Policy from Michigan State University (MSU) in 1995.

== Career ==
Upon completing her PhD, Calabrese Barton attended Teachers College and joined the faculty at Columbia University from 2001 until 2006. As an associate professor of Science Education and Director of the Urban Science Education Center at Teachers College, Columbia University (TC), she began revising both masters and doctoral programs in Science Education. She also improved science education in public schools around the city, specifically at Harlem Middle School for Mathematics and Science located in a low-income neighbourhood. Through her work, Barton has examined ways in which marginalized young people find science useful and connect scientific ideas to personal and community concerns, sometimes in unanticipated ways.

Calabrese Barton co-edited the book Internationalisation and Globalisation in Mathematics and Science Education, in 2007 before accepting a position at MSU. In this role, Calabrese Barton was named co-editor of the Journal of Research in Science Teaching for five years. The following year, she was the recipient of a $1.2 million grant to the University of Rochester's Warner School of Education to expand Science STARS (Students Tackling Authentic and Relevant Science). In 2017, Calabrese Barton was elected a Fellow of the American Educational Research Association.

Prior to the 2019–20 academic year, Calabrese Barton left MSU and became a Full professor at the University of Michigan. In this role, she was the primary investigator of a National Science Foundation funded project titled "Tools for Teaching and Learning Engineering Practices: Pathways Towards Productive Identity Work in Engineering." Later, her paper Designing for rightful presence in STEM: The role of making present practices was selected for the Best Paper Published in the Journal of the Learning Sciences Award for 2019.

=== GET City ===
During her tenure at Columbia, Calabrese Barton and her husband created a Green Energy Technology (GET) City program to help students "learn the advanced (information technology) skills that are in demand in the workplace but not necessarily taught in school that will open up college opportunities and careers for kids." Upon leaving Columbia for MSU, she brought the program on a larger scale to the city. By its fourth year at MSU, the program assisted over 120 youth in investigating locally and globally relevant issues in green energy. GET City specifically targeted and engaged middle school youth from low-income and under-represented backgrounds in 200 hours of programming. In recognition of her efforts, the program received the 2012 Afterschool Innovator Award by the Afterschool Alliance and MetLife Foundation. She also received the Outreach Scholarship Community Partnership Award, given in recognition of a mutually beneficial and sustained campus-community research partnership, and the 2013-14 MSU Service-Learning and Civic Engagement Award.

In 2016, Calabrese Barton received the William T. Grant Foundation's Distinguished Fellows Program to "explore the potential of makerspaces to create equitable learning opportunities for youth." As a result of her experience, she co-developed the Think Tank maker space at Impression 5 Science Center and published comprehensive findings from her approach in American Educational Research Journal.
