= Angella (given name) =

Angella is a given name.

Notable people with this name include:

- Angella Dravid (born 1985/1986), New Zealand comedian
- Angella Emurwon, Ugandan playwright
- Angella D. Ferguson (1925–2026), American pediatrician
- Angella Katatumba (born 1989), Ugandan musical artist
- Angella Nazarian, American former academic, non-fiction author, conference organizer and philanthropist
- Angella Okutoyi (born 2004), Kenyan tennis player
- Angella Taylor-Issajenko (born 1958), Canadian sprinter
