= Angela Maria Bottari =

Italian politician (1945–2023)

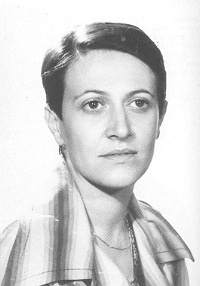
- Bottari in 1979

Member of the Chamber of Deputies of Italy
- In office 5 July 1976 – 1 July 1987

Personal details
- Born: 16 March 1945 Messina, Italy
- Died: 14 November 2023 (aged 78) Messina, Italy
- Party: PCI (1971–1991); PDS (1991–1998); DS (1998–2007); PD (2007–2023)

Angela Maria Bottari (16 March 1945 – 14 November 2023) was an Italian politician. A member of the Italian Communist Party, she served in the Chamber of Deputies from 1976 to 1987.

Bottari died in Messina on 14 November 2023, at the age of 78.
