= Angela Christine Bridgland =

Australian librarian

- Born: 1952 (age 73–74)
- Education: Tasmanian College of Advanced Education Melbourne College of Advanced Education University of Melbourne (PhD)
- Occupations: Teacher-librarian; Library educator; Academic; Consultant
- Known for: University Librarian at the University of Melbourne Fellow of the Australian Library and Information Association

Angela Christine Bridgland (born 1952) is an Australian teacher-librarian, library educator, academic, consultant and former board member and Fellow of Australian Library and Information Association. She is recognised for her contributions to higher education course development and staff development.

== Career ==
Bridgland taught at the Tasmanian and Melbourne Colleges of Advanced Education and University of Melbourne. She has been involved in senior management at University of Melbourne Libraries since 1994, including as Directory of the Library and University Librarian.

Bridgland served on the Victorian Branch Council of Australian Library and Information Association between 1982 and 1984, before becoming Branch president in 1985. She served on the Australian Library and Information Association Board of Education from 1989 until 1994.

In 1987 Bridgland was awarded a Fellowship at Library and Archives Canada, studying staff development. She has written widely on higher education staff development, including her Masters thesis on library instruction for teaching staff and her PhD thesis on Australian academic and state library staff.
