= Angela Jerabek =

Educational Leader

Angela Jerabek is an American educator and author. She developed the BARR ("Building Assets, Reducing Risks") educational model in 1999 and is the founder and Executive Director of the BARR Center, a nonprofit organization established in 2018.

== Education ==
Jerabek earned a B.A. in music from the College of Saint Benedict (1990) and an M.S. in counseling psychology from St. Cloud State University (1992).

== The BARR model ==
Jerabek developed the BARR (Building Assets, Reducing Risks) model in 1999 as a school counselor in a suburb of Minneapolis, Minnesota. In response to the school's high failure rate, Jerabek designed and implemented methods to improve student and staff outcomes. She named these methods BARR (Building Assets, Reducing Risks). The BARR model uses a data-driven and relationship-building approach that aims to meet both the academic and non-academic needs of students. As of 2024, the BARR model was in use by approximately 350 schools in 24 US states.

In 2010, the U.S. Department of Education's Investing in Innovation (i3) program awarded Jerabek with three grants in support of her BARR work. The grant included conducting randomized controlled trials involving 78 schools over a period of ten years. The results were evaluated by the American Institutes for Research (AIR) and showed improved whole child skills, higher level of student engagement, reduced chronic absenteeism, and increased math and reading achievement scores. Teachers reported increased collaboration with colleagues, more effective use of data, and improved perception of students and school supports.

The BARR model has earned praise from educational experts. According to Johannes Bos, Senior Vice President of American Institutes for Research, "Implementation of BARR is possible in many different scenarios [...] This program seems to work pretty much across the board." John B. King Jr., Chancellor of the State University of New York (SUNY) and former United States Secretary of Education in the Barack Obama Administration, also praised BARR. Jerabek recently contributed a chapter on the BARR model to the Handbook of Resilience in Children (Springer, 2023, 3rd Edition).

== Honors and awards ==
In 2021, Jerabek won the Thomas B. Fordham Institute "Wisest Wonk" award for her paper, "Reimagining teacher teams to address students' mental health."

== Media coverage ==
Jerabek has been featured in CBS, CNBC, EdNote, Education Post, The Hechinger Report, National Public Radio, The 74, and USA Today.
