= Angel (given name) =

- Pronunciation: /ˈeɪndʒəl/ Spanish: [ˈaŋxel]
- Gender: Unisex
- Language: Greek

Origin
- Meaning: "Angel"

Other names
- See also: Angelina, Angelica, Angela, Angelo, Angie, Ange, Angèle, Angélique, Ángel, Angelos, Anxo

Angel is a given name meaning "angel". In the English-speaking world Angel is used for both boys and girls.

Angel is from the medieval Latin masculine name Angelus, which was derived from the name of the heavenly creature (itself derived from the Ancient Greek word ἄγγελος (angelos) meaning "messenger"). It is gradually gaining popularity in the English-speaking world, where it is sometimes used as a feminine given name in modern times. In the United States, it is also seeing increasing use among boys, usually using the standard English pronunciation of the word angel.

Ángel (pronounced /ˈanxel/) is a common male name in Spanish-speaking countries, while the plural form Ángeles is usually given to girls.

== Variations ==
- Albanian: Engjëll, Ankelo, Anxhelo
- Asturian: Ánxel, Ánxelu, Xelu (short)
- Bulgarian: Ангел (Angel) (masc.), Ангелина (Angelina) (fem.)
- Croatian: Anđeo, Anđelko (masc.); Anđela, Anđelka (fem.)
- French: Ange (masc.), Angèl (masc.), Angèle (fem.), Angélique (fem.)
- Galician: Anxo
- Gascon: Angé, Angeoul
- Greek: Άγγελος Angelos (masc.), Αγγελική Angeliki (fem.), Αγγελίνα Angelina (fem.), Αγγελίτα Angelita (fem.), Αγγέλα Angela (fem.)
- Hungarian: Angyal, Angyalka
- Italian: Angelo, Angelino, Angela, Angelina, Angelica (fem.)
- Indonesian: Angel, Angelina, Angelika, Angela, Angie, Angelica, Angeline
- Languedocien dialect: Angel, Anxo
- Macedonian: Ангел (Angel, masc,), Ангела (Angela, fem,), Ангелина (Angelina, fem.)
- Māori: Anahera
- Polish: Aniol, Angela, Aniela, Angelika, Angelina
- Portuguese: Ângelo, Ângela (fem.), Angelino, Angelina (fem.), Angélica (fem.)
- Spanish: Ángel, Ángela (fem.), Angélica (fem.), Ángeles (fem.), Angelines (fem.), Angelita (fem.), Angelina (fem.)

== People with the given name ==
=== Angel ===
- Angel de Grimoard (c. 1315/1320 – 1388) younger brother of Pope Urban V
- Angel Acevedo (born 1982), American filmmaker
- Angel Acuña Lizaña (1919–1997), Mexican basketball player
- Angel Adams Parham, American scholar and academic
- Angel Agache (born 1976), Moldovan politician
- Angel Alcala (1929–2023), Filipino biologist
- Angel Alvarez (born 1997), American soccer player
- Angel Amaya (born 1934), Venezuelan boxer
- Angel Angelov (born 1948), Bulgarian boxer
- Angel Aquino (born 1973), Filipina actress
- Angel Arribas Lopez (born 1993), Spanish chess grandmaster
- Angel Arroyo (born 1965), Puerto Rican weightlifter
- Angel Baffard (1655–1726), Augustinian friar and genealogist
- Angel Balzarino (1943–2018), Argentine writer
- Angel Bartolotta (born 1981), American drummer
- Angel Bastunov (born 1999), Bulgarian footballer
- Angel Bat Dawid, American jazz musician
- Angel Batista, fictional character from the TV series Dexter
- Angel Beltrán (born 1973), Cuban volleyball player
- Angel Bermudez, Aruban politician
- Angel Bismark Curiel (born 1995), American actor
- Angel Blu, British singer
- Angel Blue (born 1984), American singer
- Angel Bolques Jr., American politician from the U. S. V. I.
- Angel Bonanni (born 1972), Uruguayan-born Israeli model and actor
- Angel Boris (born 1974), American model and actress
- Angel Bravo Lorio, Nicaraguan politician
- Angel Bunner (born 1989), American softball player
- Angel Campos (born 1973), American baseball umpire
- Angel Canino (born 2003), Filipino volleyball player
- Angel Casey, American television and radio actress
- Angel Cejudo, American freestyle wrestler
- Angel Chakarov (born 1950), Bulgarian swimmer
- Angel Chang, American fashion designer
- Angel Joy Chavis Rocker (1966–2003), American guidance counselor and presidential candidate
- Angel Chervenkov (born 1964), Bulgarian footballer and manager
- Angel Chiang (born 1989), Hong Kong actress
- Angel Chibozo (born 2003), Beninese footballer
- Angel Chivilli (born 2002), Dominican baseball player
- Angel Clivillés, American singer
- Angel Collinson (born 1990), American freestyle skier
- Angel Colón-Pérez (born 1977), Puerto Rican judge
- Angel Corella (born 1975), Spanish ballet dancer
- Angel Coulby (born 1980), English actress
- Angel Cruchaga Santa María (1893–1964), Chilean writer
- Angel Cruz, American politician
- Angel Cuan (born 1989), Panamanian baseball player
- Angel Daleman (born 2007), Dutch speed skater
- Angel De Cora (1871–1919), Winnebago painter
- Angel Delgadillo (born 1927), American barber and businessowner in Seligman, Arizona
- Angel Delgado Fuentes (born 1965), Cuban visual artist
- Angel Demapan (born 1982), Northern Mariana Islands politician
- Angel Deradoorian (born 1986), American musician
- Angel Desai, American actress
- Angel Dimitrov (1927–2005), Bulgarian politician
- Angel Dones (born 1990), Puerto Rican judoka
- Angel Dzhambazki (born 1979), Bulgarian politician
- Angel Echevarria (1971–2020), American baseball player
- Angel Elderkin (born 1977), American basketball coach
- Angel Escobedo (born 1987), American wrestler
- Angel Espinosa (1966–2017), Cuban boxer
- Angel Espoy (1879–1963), Spanish-American painter
- Angel Estrada (born 1978), American football player
- Angel Faith (born 1988), American singer and songwriter
- Angel Fashion (born 1987), Puerto Rican professional wrestler
- Angel Figueroa (1929–1953), Puerto Rican boxer
- Angel Flores, American powerlifter
- Angel Forrest (born 1967), Canadian singer
- Angel Fuentes (born 1961), Puerto Rican politician
- Angel Funes, screenwriter, director and actor
- Angel Gabriele (1956–2016), American comic book artist and professional wrestling manager
- Angel Gagliano (born 1950), Argentine athlete
- Angel Galang (born 2000), Filipino drag performer
- Angel Garza (born 1992), Mexican professional wrestler
- Angel Gavrilov (born 1927), Bulgarian sprinter
- Angel Gavrovski (born 1942), Macedonian painter
- Angel Genchev (born 1967), Bulgarian weightlifter
- Angel Georgiev (born 1988), Bulgarian politician
- Angel Ginev (born 1976), Bulgarian footballer
- Angel Glady (born 1986), Indian actress
- Angel Gomes (born 2000), English footballer
- Angel Goodrich (born 1990), American basketball player
- Angel Gracia, American film director and producer
- Angel Granchov (born 1992), Bulgarian footballer
- Angel de Grimoard (c. 1315/1320-1388), French Roman Catholic cardinal
- Angel Guardian (born 1998), Filipina actress and singer
- Angel Guerreros (born 1953), Paraguayan sprinter
- Àngel Guimerà (1845–1924), Spanish writer, poet and playwright
- Angel Haze (born 1991), American rapper and singer
- Angel G. Hermida, former Superior Court Judge of the Commonwealth of PR
- Angel Hermida (born 1967), Spanish handball player
- Angel Ho (born 2007), Taiwanese actress
- Angel Hobayan (1929–2023), Filipino bishop
- Angel Hong (born 1988), Taiwanese actress and singer
- Angel Hsu (born 1983), American environmental scientist
- Angel Jackson (born 2001), American basketball player
- Angel Mary Joseph (born 1953), Indian athletics competitor
- Angel Kalburov (1955–2014), Bulgarian footballer
- Angel Kanchev (c. 1850–1872), Bulgarian revolutionary
- Angel Karamoy (born 1987), Indonesian actress and singer
- Angel Kelley (born 1967), American judge
- Angel Kelly, American pornographic actress
- Angel Kerezov (1939–2002), Bulgarian Greco-Roman wrestler
- Angel Khanyile (born 1982), South African politician
- Angel Kodinov (born 1997), Bulgarian canoeist
- Angel Kolev (athlete) (1926–1998), Bulgarian athlete
- Angel Kolev (born 1953), Bulgarian footballer and manager
- Angel Koritarov (1941–2019), Bulgarian volleyball player
- Angel Krstev (born 1980), Czech ice hockey player
- angel Kyodo williams (born 1966), American writer
- Angel Lagdameo (1940–2022), Catholic Bishop of Jaro
- Angel Lam (composer) (born 1978), Hong Kong composer
- Angel Lam (actress), Hong Kong actress and model
- Angel Lamung (born 1997), Burmese actress, model and beauty queen
- Angel Leigh McCoy, American game designer and fiction writer
- Angel Locsin (born 1985), Filipina actress
- Angel Lozano, Spanish electrical engineer
- Angel G. Luévano (born 1949), American labor leader and activist
- Angel Luna (born 1989), Argentine footballer
- Angel Lyaskov (born 1998), Bulgarian footballer
- Angel Maldonado (swimmer) (1927–2018), Mexican swimmer
- Àngel Mañana (born 1985), Equatoguinean basketball player
- Angel Manfredy (born 1974), American boxer
- Angel Marcloid (born 1984), American experimental multi-instrumentalist, record producer, mix and mastering engineer, and visual artist
- Angel Marin (1942–2024), Bulgarian politician
- Angel Martino (born 1967), American swimmer
- Angel Matos García, Puerto Rican politician
- Angel Maxine, Ghanaian musician
- Angel McCoughtry (born 1986), American basketball player
- Angel Mendez (1946–1967), United States Marine
- Angel Metodiev (1921–1984), Bulgarian painter
- Angel Mora (born 1948), Cuban field hockey player
- Angel Moraes (1965–2021), American DJ
- Angel Mariano de Morales y Jasso (c. 1784–1843), Mexican clergyman
- Angel Morey, Puerto Rican politician
- Angel Moya Acosta (born 1964), Cuban dissident
- Angel Mulu (born 1999), New Zealand rugby union player
- Angel Muñoz, Puerto Rican politician
- Angel Nafis (born 1988), American poet and spoken-word artist
- Angel Nyigu, Tanzanian dancer and choreographer
- Angel Olsen (born 1987), American singer and songwriter
- Angel Oquendo (born 1981), American actor
- Angel Parker (born 1980), American actress
- Angel Penna Sr. (1923–1992), Argentine horse trainer
- Angel Pepelyankov (born 1949), Bulgarian modern pentathlete
- Angel Perkins (born 1984), American sprinter
- Àngel Pla (1930–2021), Spanish-born Andorran wood carver
- Angel Planells (c. 1901–1989), Spanish painter
- Angel Porrino (born 1989), American television personality, actress, dancer and showgirl
- Angel Pumpalov (born 1978), Bulgarian alpine skier
- Angel Rahov (born 1986), Bulgarian footballer
- Angel Ramirez (politician), American politician
- Angel Ramírez (rower) (born 1955), Cuban rower
- Àngel Rangel (born 1982), Spanish footballer
- Angel Reece (born 1983), American professional wrestler known as Hailey Hatred
- Angel Reese (born 2002), American professional basketball player
- Angel Rivero, Filipino actress, host and DJ
- Angel Rivillo (born 1978), Venezuelan soccer player
- Angel Rodrigues, American soccer player
- Angel Romaeo (born 1997), Welsh artistic gymnast
- Àngel Ros (born 1952), Spanish politician and statesman
- Angel Rubio (American football) (born 1975), American football player
- Àngel Sabata (1911–1990), Spanish water polo player
- Angel Santos (1959–2003), American politician
- Angel Savov (1925–1990), Bulgarian stage and film actor
- Angel Scull (1928–2005), Cuban baseball player
- Angel Serra (born 1951), Cuban rower
- Angel Shijoy, Indian voice actress
- Ángel Simón (born 1957), Spanish executive
- Angel So, Hong Kong lawn bowler
- Angel Solakov (1922–1998), Bulgarian politician
- Angel Somov (born 1990), Austrian bobsledder
- Angel Sotirov (1943–2017), Bulgarian wrestler
- Angel Stankov (born 1953), Bulgarian footballer
- Angel Stoykov (born 1977), Bulgarian footballer
- Angel Tasevski (born 1981), Macedonian basketball player
- Angel Taveras (born 1970), American lawyer and politician
- Angel Taylor (born 1988), American singer-songwriter
- Angel Theory (born 1999), American actress
- Angel Tîlvăr (born 1962), Romanian politician
- Angel Tompkins (born 1942), American actress and model
- Angel Unigwe (born 2009), Nigerian actress
- Angel Unzueta, Spanish comic book artist
- Angel Alfredo Vera (born 1972), Argentine footballer and coach
- Angel Villalona (born 1990), Dominican Republic baseball player
- Angel Vivaldi (born 1985), American guitarist, songwriter and producer
- Angel Wagenstein (1922–2023), Bulgarian screenwriter and author
- Angel Wainaina (1983–2009), Kenyan actress
- Angel Wanjiru, Kenyan musician
- Angel Waruih (born 2003), footballer
- Angel Wong (born 1987), Hong Kong gymnast
- Angel Yassenov (born 1965), Bulgarian wrestler
- Angel Yin (born 1998), American professional golfer
- Angel Yondjo (born 2007), Cameroonian footballer
- Angel Yoshev (born 1985), Bulgarian footballer
- Angel Yusev (born 1988), Bulgarian footballer

=== Ángel ===
- Ángel Acebes (born 1958), Spanish politician
- Ángel Acevedo (born 1941), Puerto Rican professional wrestler
- Ángel Acosta (born 1990), Puerto Rican professional boxer
- Ángel Acosta León (1930–1964), Cuban painter
- Ángel Aguayo (born 2006), Paraguayan footballer
- Ángel Aguiar (1926–2008), Cuban gymnast
- Ángel Alarcón (born 2004), Spanish footballer
- Ángel Alcázar de Velasco (1909–2001), Spanish journalist
- Ángel Aldana (1936–2025), Guatemalan wrestler
- Ángel Alfaro, Spanish footballer
- Ángel Alfonso (1901–?), Cuban baseball player
- Ángel Algobia (born 1999), Spanish footballer
- Ángel Allegri (1926–1981), Argentine footballer
- Ángel Alonzo (born 2000), Mexican footballer
- Ángel Alvarado (born 2000), Mexican archer
- Ángel Amarilla (born 1981), Paraguayan footballer
- Ángel Andreo (born 1972), Spanish water polo player
- Ángel Antar (born 1972), Paraguayan footballer
- Ángel Aragón (1890–1952), Cuban baseball player
- Ángel Aranda (1934–2024), Spanish actor
- Ángel Arango (1926–2013), Cuban writer
- Ángel Leonidas Araújo Chiriboga, Ecuadorian composer, poet, tax collector and hotelier
- Ángel Arocha (1907–1938), Spanish footballer
- Ángel Arroyo (born 1956), Spanish cyclist
- Ángel Arteaga (1928–1984), Spanish musician and composer
- Ángel Arzanegui (1917–1975), Spanish footballer
- Ángel Atienza (1931–2015), Spanish footballer and artist
- Ángel Ayala (born 2000), Mexican boxer
- Ángel Azteca (1963–2007), Mexican professional wrestler
- Ángel Azteca Jr. (born 1980), Mexican professional wrestler
- Ángel Baena (born 2000), Spanish footballer
- Ángel Báez (1894–1920), Chilean footballer
- Ángel Bahamonde Magro (born 1949), Spanish historian
- Ángel Eduardo Balarezo, Ecuadorian-American criminal defense lawyer
- Ángel Darío Banegas (born 1969), Honduran politician
- Ángel Barajas (born 2006), Colombian artistic gymnast
- Ángel Bargas (born 1946), Argentine footballer
- Ángel Barja (1938–1987), Spanish composer
- Ángel Barlocco (1899–?), Uruguayan footballer
- Ángel Bastos (born 1992), Spanish footballer
- Ángel Bautista (born 1994), Mexican footballer
- Ángel Bello (1951–2013), Argentine archer
- Ángel Beltré (born 1963), Dominican boxer
- Ángel Bernuncio (born 1965), Argentine footballer and manager
- Ángel O. Berríos (1940–2006), Puerto Rican mayor
- Ángel Betular (1891–1938), Argentine footballer
- Ángel Blanco (1938–1986), Mexican professional wrestler
- Ángel Bonomini (1929–1994), Argentine writer
- Ángel Borlenghi (1904–1962), Argentine labour leader and politician
- Ángel Bossio (1905–1978), Argentine footballer
- Ángel Botello (1913–1986), American painter
- Ángel Boyenechea (born 1947), Argentine equestrian
- Ángel Bracho (1911–2005), Mexican painter
- Ángel Brau (born 1975), Spanish footballer
- Ángel Bravo (born 1942), Venezuelan baseball player
- Ángel Brunell (born 1945), Uruguayan footballer
- Ángel Buendía Tirado (born 1951), Mexican economist and politician
- Ángel Bueno (born 1963), Cuban athlete
- Ángel Bulerín (born 1949), Puerto Rican politician
- Ángel Burgueño (born 1973), Spanish racing driver
- Ángel Bustos (born 1961), Chilean footballer
- Ángel Calderón de la Barca y Belgrano (c. 1790–1861), Spanish nobleman and politician
- Ángel Calvet (1909–?), Spanish footballer
- Ángel Camargo (born 1967), Colombian cyclist
- Ángel Camarillo (born 1959), Spanish cyclist
- Ángel Canavery (1850–1916), Argentine military man
- Ángel Cancel (born 1940), Puerto Rican basketball player
- Ángel Cappa (born 1946), Argentine footballer and manager
- Ángel Cappelletti, Argentine philosopher
- Ángel Cardozo Lucena (born 1994), Paraguayan footballer
- Ángel Carrasco, Argentine sailor
- Ángel Carrasco Nolasco (1907–1943), Spanish politician
- Ángel Carrascosa (born 1990), Spanish footballer
- Ángel Carreño (born 1980), Chilean footballer
- Ángel Carvajal Bernal (1901–1985), Mexican politician
- Ángel Casero (born 1972), Spanish cyclist
- Ángel Castellanos (1952–2024), Spanish footballer
- Ángel del Castillo Agramonte (1834–1869), Cuban revolutionary
- Ángel Castresana (born 1972), Spanish cyclist
- Ángel Cayetano (born 1991), Uruguayan footballer
- Ángel Chacón (born 1973), Puerto Rican boxer
- Ángel Chávez (born 1981), Panamanian baseball player
- Ángel Cheme (born 1981), Ecuadorian footballer
- Ángel Chiessa (c. 1900–1961), Argentine footballer
- Ángel Chourio (born 1985), Venezuelan footballer
- Ángel Colla (born 1973), Argentine cyclist
- Ángel Comizzo (born 1962), Argentine footballer and manager
- Ángel Cordero Jr. (born 1942), Puerto Rican jockey
- Ángel Correa (born 1995), Argentine footballer
- Ángel Corsino Fernández (born 1951), Spanish sports shooter
- Ángel María Cortellini (1819–1887), Spanish painter
- Ángel Crego (born 1964), Spanish football manager
- Ángel Crespo (1926–1995), Spanish poet and translator
- Ángel Cristo (1944–2010), Spanish circus performer
- Ángel Cuéllar (born 1972), Spanish footballer and manager
- Ángel Cuetos (1936–2016), Spanish wrestler
- Ángel Custodio Loyola (1926–1985), Venezuelan musician
- Ángel De Jesús (born 1997), Dominican baseball player
- Ángel Dealbert (born 1983), Spanish footballer
- Ángel Delgado (born 1994), Dominican basketball player
- Ángel Della Valle (1855–1903), Argentine painter
- Ángel Dennis (born 1977), Italian volleyball player
- Ángel Deschamps Falcón (born 1955), Mexican politician
- Ángel D'Meza (1877–1954), Cuban baseball player
- Ángel Díaz Balbín (1955–1986), Peruvian triple murderer and suspected serial killer
- Ángel Di María (born 1988), Argentine footballer
- Ángel Dior, Dominican rapper
- Ángel Duarte Valverde (1934–2024), Ecuadorian politician
- Ángel Edo (born 1970), Spanish cyclist
- Ángel Escobar (born 1965), Venezuelan baseball player
- Ángel Escribano (born 1971), Spanish businessman
- Ángel Espada (born 1948), Puerto Rican boxer
- Ángel de Estrada (1872–1923), Argentine poet, novelist and writer
- Ángel Faivovich (1901–1992), Chilean politician
- Ángel Famiglietti (1927–2001), Panamanian weightlifter
- Ángel Faus Belau (1936–2020), Spanish journalist and academic
- Ángel Felipe (born 1997), Dominican baseball player
- Ángel Fernández (born 1971), Ecuadorian footballer
- Ángel Fernández Artime (born 1960), Roman Catholic Salesian priest
- Ángel Fernández Pérez (born 1988), Spanish handball player
- Ángel Fernández-Santos (1934–2004), Spanish film critic and screenwriter
- Ángel Ferrant (1890–c. 1961), Spanish sculptor
- Ángel Figueroa (born 1981), Puerto Rican basketball player
- Ángel Fleitas (1914–2006), Cuban baseball player
- Ángel Flisfisch (1941–2022), Chilean lawyer
- Ángel Floro Martínez (1940–2023), Spanish bishop
- Ángel Fontane (born 1960), Cuban field hockey player
- Ángel Fortuño (born 2001), Spanish footballer
- Ángel Fournier (1987–2023), Cuban rower
- Ángel Franco (born 1958), Paraguayan golfer
- Ángel Fuentes (born 1996), Spanish cyclist
- Ángel Gabilondo (born 1949), Spanish politician and professor
- Ángel Galarza (1892–1966), Spanish lawyer, journalist and politician
- Ángel Galván (born 1993), Spanish footballer
- Ángel Ganivet (1865–1898), Spanish writer and diplomat
- Ángel Garasa (1905–1976), Spanish-Mexican actor
- Ángel María Garibay K. (1892–1967), Mexican Roman Catholic priest, philologist, linguist, historian and scholar
- Ángel Garó (born 1965), Spanish actor and comedian
- Ángel Garrido (born 1964), Spanish politician
- Ángel María Gianola (1926–2022), Uruguayan lawyer and politician
- Ángel Gil, Mexican artisan
- Ángel Gil-Ordóñez, Spanish-born American conductor
- Ángel Giménez (born 1955), Spanish tennis player
- Ángel Pelayo Gordillo, Spanish politician
- Ángel Gorordo (1904–1974), Argentine fencer
- Ángel Granda (born 1997), Spanish windsurfer
- Ángel Grippa (born 1914), Argentine footballer
- Ángel Guastella (1931–2016), Argentine rugby player
- Ángel Sergio Guerrero Mier (1935–2021), Mexican politician
- Ángel Aníbal Guevara (born 1925), Guatemalan politician
- Ángel Guido (1896–1960), Argentine architect, engineer and writer
- Ángel Guirado (born 1984), Filipino footballer
- Ángel Guirola (1826–1910), Salvadoran politician
- Ángel Guzmán (born 1981), Venezuelan baseball player
- Ángel Heras (born 1958), Spanish sprinter
- Ángel Hernando (born 1959), Spanish professor at the University of Huelva
- Ángel Hidalgo (born 1998), Spanish professional golfer
- Ángel Ibáñez (born 1939), Spanish cyclist
- Ángel Ibáñez Hernando (born 1974), Spanish politician
- Ángel Infante (1914–1987), Mexican actor and singer
- Ángel de Iturbide y Huarte (1816–1872), Mexican prince
- Ángel Iturriaga Barco, Spanish writer and historian
- Ángel Janiquet (born 1962), Spanish ski jumper
- Ángel Jara Saguier (1936–2008), Paraguayan footballer
- Angel de Jesús (born 1957), Venezuelan footballer
- Ángel de Jesús Camacho Ramírez (born 2004), Mexican Paralympic swimmer
- Angel de Jesús Sánchez (1891–1951), Puerto Rican judge
- Ángel Juanes Peces (born 1947), Spanish retired judge
- Ángel Labruna (1918–1983), Argentine footballer
- Ángel Laferrara (1917–1990), Argentine footballer
- Ángel Lafita (born 1984), Spanish footballer
- Ángel Landucci (born 1948), Argentinian footballer
- Ángel Ledesma (born 1993), Ecuadorian footballer
- Ángel Lekumberri (born 1970), Spanish former football player
- Ángel Lemus (born 1971), Mexican footballer
- Ángel León Gozalo (1907–1979), Spanish sport shooter
- Ángel León (chef), Spanish chef
- Ángel Leyes (1930–1996), Argentine boxer
- Ángel Lezama (born 1997), Venezuelan footballer
- Ángel Liberal Lucini (1921–2006), Spanish military officer
- Ángel Lizcano Monedero (1846–1929), Spanish painter
- Ángel Lo Valvo (1909–1978), Argentine racing driver
- Ángel Lombardo (born 1983), Panamanian footballer
- Ángel Lombarte, Spanish actor
- Ángel Lozada (born 1968), American novelist
- Ángel Luis (born 1970), Spanish footballer and manager
- Ángel Medardo Luzuriaga (1935–2018), Ecuadorian musical artist
- Ángel José Macín (born 1967), Argentine Roman Catholic bishop
- Ángel Madrazo (born 1988), Spanish road bicycle racer
- Ángel Magaña (1915–1982), Argentine actor
- Ángel de Maldonado (c. 1660–1728), Roman Catholic prelate
- Ángel Maldonado (footballer) (born 1973), Mexican footballer
- Ángel Malvicino (1921–2008), Argentine rower
- Ángel Mangual (1947–2021), Puerto Rican baseball player
- Ángel M. Marchand (1912–2005), Puerto Rican allergy researcher
- Ángel Marcos (born 1943), Argentine footballer and manager
- Ángel Marín, Spanish Paralympic athlete
- Ángel Mariscal (1904–1979), Spanish footballer
- Ángel Marquina y Corrales (1859–1928), Spanish Roman Catholic bishop
- Ángel Matías (born 1976), Puerto Rican volleyball player
- Ángel Matos (born 1976), Cuban taekwondo athlete
- Ángel Abel Mavil (born 1966), Mexican politician
- Ángel César Mendoza Arámburo (1934–2014), Mexican politician
- Ángel Muñoz García also known as Jordi El Niño Polla (born 1994), Spanish pornographic actor
- Ángel Manuel Olmos (born 1974), Spanish musicologist and entrepreneur
- Ángel Matías (born 1976), Puerto Rican volleyball player
- Ángel Matos (born 1976), Cuban taekwondo practitioner
- Ángel Maza (born 1954), Argentine politician
- Ángel Mejías (born 1959), Spanish footballer and coach
- Ángel Melogno (1905–1945), Uruguayan footballer
- Ángel Mena (born 1988), Ecuadorian footballer
- Ángel Menchaca (1855–1924), Paraguayan-Argentine musicologist theorist
- Ángel Merino (born 1966), Spanish footballer and manager
- Ángel Miguel (1929–2009), Spanish golfer
- Ángel Miranda (born 1969), Puerto Rican baseball player
- Ángel Mislan (1862–1911), Puerto Rican composer
- Ángel Molinari (born 2000), Puerto Rican footballer
- Ángel Monares (born 1973), Mexican footballer and manager
- Ángel Montes de Oca (born 2003), Dominican Republic footballer
- Ángel Morales (Spanish footballer) (born 1975)
- Ángel Morales (born 1975), Argentine footballer
- Ángel Morey Noble, Puerto Rican politician
- Ángel Mortal Jr. (born 1992), Mexican professional wrestler
- Ángel Mullera (born 1984), Spanish steeplechase runner
- Ángel Navarro, Spanish settler and patriarch of San Antonio, Texas
- Ángel Nesbitt (born 1990), Venezuelan baseball player
- Ángel Nieto (1947–2017), Spanish motorcycle racer
- Ángel Masié Ntutumu (1930–2020), Equatorial Guinean politician
- Ángel Núñez, Paraguayan footballer
- Ángel Obando, Honduran footballer
- Ángel Ocaña (born 1960), Spanish cyclist
- Ángel Ojeda (born 1992), Peruvian footballer
- Ángel Oliva (born 1961), Spanish football manager and retired player
- Ángel Orelien (born 2001), Panamanian footballer
- Ángel de Oro (born 1988), Mexican professional wrestler
- Ángel Ortega (born 1989), Spanish footballer
- Ángel Orué (born 1989), Paraguayan footballer
- Ángel Ossorio y Gallardo (1873–1946), Spanish lawyer and statesman
- Ángel Pagán (born 1981), Puerto Rican baseball player
- Ángel Partida (born 1989), Mexican footballer
- Ángel Pasta Muñuzuri (born 1954), Mexican politician
- Ángel Patrick (born 1992), Panamanian footballer
- Ángel Paulino Canul (born 1962), Mexican politician
- Ángel Paz (1950–2008), Honduran footballer
- Ángel Pedraza (1962–2011), Spanish footballer
- Ángel Vicente Peñaloza (1798–1863), Argentine military officer and provincial leader
- Ángel Peralta Pineda (1926–2018), Spanish bullfighter
- Ángel Perdomo (born 1994), Dominican baseball player
- Angel Perkins (born 1984), American sprinter
- Ángel Perucca (1918–1981), Argentine footballer
- Ángel Pestaña (1886–1937), Spanish anarchy-syndicalist
- Ángel Picazo (1917–1998), Spanish actor
- Ángel Pindado (born 1976), Spanish footballer and coach
- Ángel Ponz, Spanish footballer
- Ángel del Pozo (1934–2025), Spanish actor
- Ángel Prudencio (born 1990), Argentinian association football player
- Ángel Puertas (born 1980), Argentine footballer
- Ángel Pulgar (born 1989), Venezuelan cyclist
- Ángel Pulido (1852–1932), Spanish politician
- Ángel Pután (born 1986), Ecuadorian footballer
- Ángel Quintero Alfaro (1916–1992), Puerto Rican academic and politician
- Ángel Rambert (1936–1983), French footballer
- Ángel Ramírez de Cartagena y Marcaida (1901–1977), Spanish military officer
- Ángel Rebelde (born 1997), Mexican professional wrestler
- Ángel Maturino Reséndiz (1959–2006), Mexican serial killer and rapist
- Ángel David Revilla Lenoci (born 1982), better known as Dross (YouTuber), Venezuelan YouTuber and writer
- Ángel Reyes (1919–1988), Cuban-American violinist
- Ángel Reyna (born 1984), Mexican footballer
- Ángel Ribera Arnal (1909–2002), Spanish chess player
- Ángel Riesco Carbajo (1902–1972), Spanish Roman Catholic prelate
- Ángel Riveras (1908–1993), Spanish sailor
- Ángel Rivero Méndez (1856–1930), Puerto Rican soldier, author and businessman
- Ángel Robledo (1917–2014), Argentine politician
- Ángel Rodado (born 1997), Spanish footballer
- Ángel Roldán (1915–1977), Mexican fencer
- Ángel Román (born 1984), Puerto Rican taekwondo practitioner
- Ángel Romano (1893–1972), Uruguayan footballer
- Ángel Rondón (born 1997), Dominican baseball player
- Ángel Rosa, Puerto Rican politician
- Ángel Aníbal Rosado (1942–2008), Peruvian composer and musician
- Ángel Luis Rosas Collazo (born 1934), Puerto Rican businessman and academic
- Ángel Rosenblat (1902–1984), Venezuelan writer
- Ángel Rovere, Argentine weightlifter
- Ángel Royo (born 1966), Spanish football manager
- Ángel Rozas (born 1950), Argentine politician
- Ángel Rubalcava (born 1992), Mexican footballer
- Ángel Rubio (composer) (1846–1907), Spanish composer
- Ángel Rubio (physicist) (born 1965), Spanish theoretical physicist and director
- Ángel de Saavedra, 3rd Duke of Rivas (1791–1865), Spanish poet, dramatist and politician
- Ángel Sagaz Zubelzu (1913–1974), Spanish diplomat
- Ángel Marcos Salas (c. 1910–1933), Spanish trade unionist
- Ángel Salas Larrazábal (1906–1994), Spanish fighter ace and military officer
- Ángel Salazar (baseball) (born 1961), Venezuelan baseball player
- Ángel Salazar (1956–2024), Cuban-American comedian and actor
- Ángel Salomé (born 1986), Dominican baseball player
- Ángel Sanabria (born 1984), Guatemalan footballer
- Ángel Santamarina (1894–?), Argentine fencer
- Ángel Santiago (born 1956), Puerto Rican basketball player
- Ángel Santos (born 1979), Puerto Rican baseball player
- Ángel Sanz Briz (1910–1980), Spanish diplomat and humanitarian
- Ángel Sarrapio (born 1959), Spanish cyclist
- Ángel Sartori (born 1948), Chilean politician
- Ángel Sauce (1911–1995), Venezuelan composer
- Ángel Schandlein (1930–1998), Argentine footballer
- Ángel Segura (born 1982), Uruguayan windsurfer
- Ángel Roberto Seifart (1941–2018), Paraguayan politician
- Ángel Sepúlveda (born 1991), Mexican footballer
- Ángel Serafín Seriche Dougan, Equatorial Guinean politician
- Ángel Sertucha (1931–2019), Spanish footballer
- Ángel Sixto Rossi (born 1958), Argentine Catholic prelate
- Ángel Sola, Spanish musician
- Ángel Sosa (born 1976), Mexican footballer
- Ángel Manuel Soto (born 1983), Puerto Rican filmmaker
- Ángel Sposato (1922–?), Argentine weightlifter
- Ángel Suquía Goicoechea (1913–2006), Catholic cardinal and Archbishop of Madrid
- Ángel Talamantes Ponce (1917–?), Mexican politician
- Ángel Tavira (1924–2008), Mexican composer, musician and violinist
- Ángel Tejeda (born 1991), Honduran footballer
- Ángel Teruel (1950–2021), Spanish bullfighter
- Ángel Trinidad (born 1993), Spanish volleyball player
- Ángel Troncho (born 2002), Spanish footballer
- Ángel Trujillo (born 1987), Spanish footballer
- Ángel Uribe (1943–2008), Peruvian footballer
- Ángel Urrutia (born 1945), Spanish rower
- Ángel Valbuena Prat (1900–1977), Spanish philologist and historian
- Ángel Vallejo (born 1981), Spanish bicycle racer
- Ángel Daniel Vassallo (born 1986), Puerto Rican basketball player
- Ángel Velarte (born 1971), Argentine sports shooter
- Ángel Velasco Marugán (born 1986), Spanish futsal player
- Ángel Velázquez (born 1984), Mexican footballer
- Ángel Viadero (born 1969), Spanish football coach
- Ángel Vicioso (born 1977), Spanish cyclist
- Ángel Vildozo (born 1981), Argentine footballer
- Ángel Villacampa (born 1976), Spanish football manager
- Ángel María Villar (born 1950), Spanish footballer
- Ángel Villar (born 1949), Spanish canoeist
- Ángel Alfredo Villatoro, Honduran journalist and radio personality
- Ángel Villoldo (1861–1919), Argentine musician
- Ángel Viñas (born 1941), Spanish economist and diplomat
- Ángel Vivar Dorado (born 1974), Spanish footballer
- Ángel Vivas (born 1956), Venezuelan Brigadier General
- Ángel Zaldívar (born 1994), Mexican footballer
- Ángel Zapata (born 2001), Mexican footballer
- Ángel Zárraga (1886–1946), Mexican painter
- Ángel Zerpa (born 1999), Venezuelan baseball player
- Ángel Tulio Zof (1928–2014), Argentine footballer and coach
- Ángel Zubieta (1918–1985), Spanish footballer

=== Multiple people with the same surname ===
- Ángel Aguirre
- Ángel Alonso
- Ángel Cabrera
- Ángel Castro
- Angel Chan
- Ángel Díaz
- Ángel Gallardo
- Angel Garcia
- Ángel Gómez
- Ángel González
- Ángel Hernández
- Ángel Herrera
- Ángel Herrero
- Ángel Jiménez
- Ángel López
- Ángel Martín
- Ángel Martínez
- Angel Medina
- Ángel Montoro
- Ángel Moreno
- Angel Nieves
- Ángel Ortiz
- Ángel Pacheco
- Angel Padron
- Ángel Parra
- Ángel Peña
- Ángel Pérez
- Angel Ramos
- Angel Robinson
- Ángel Robles
- Ángel Rodríguez
- Ángel Rojas
- Ángel Romero
- Angel Rusev
- Ángel Sánchez
- Angel Stoyanov
- Ángel Torres

== See also ==
- Angel (disambiguation)
