= Ángel Gómez =

Ángel Gómez may refer to:

- Ángel Gómez (cyclist), Spanish cyclist
- Ángel Gómez (football manager), Spanish football coach and director
- Ángel Gómez (footballer, born 1985), Argentine midfielder
- Ángel Gómez (footballer, born 1994), Paraguayan forward
- Ángel Gómez (footballer, born 2001), Argentine midfielder

== See also ==
- Angel Gomes (born 2000), English footballer
