= Ángel González =

Ángel González may refer to:

== Artists ==
- Ángel González Muñiz (1925–2008), Spanish poet
- Ángel González, Spanish composer; see Basúchil

== Businesspeople ==
- Remigio Ángel González (born 1944), Mexican media mogul

== Politicians ==
- Angel González Román, Puerto Rican jurist
- Luis Ángel González Macchi (born 1947), President of Paraguay
- Ángel Luis González Muñoz (born 1979), Spanish politician

== Scientists ==
- Ángel Gaud González (born 1930), Puerto Rican scientist

== Footballers ==
- Ángel González (Spanish footballer) (born 1958), Spanish forward for CD Logroñés
- Ángel González (footballer, born May 1994), Argentine midfielder for Peñarol
- Ángel González (Venezuelan footballer) (born 1994), Venezuelan forward for Monagas Sport Club
- Ángel González (footballer, born 1995), Argentine midfielder for Hernán Cortés
- Ángel González (Paraguayan footballer) (born 2003), Paraguayan goalkeeper for Porto B

== See also ==
- Miguel Ángel González (disambiguation)
- Ángel Martín González (born 1964), Spanish retired footballer
