= Sotirov =

Sotirov (Bulgarian: Сотиров) is a Bulgarian surname. The feminine form is Sotirova (Bulgarian: Сотирова). Notable people with the surname include:

- Alexander Sotirov, Bulgarian-American computer security researcher
- Angel Sotirov (1943–2017), Bulgarian wrestler
- Georgi D. Sotirov (1910–1986), Bulgarian-Canadian historian and philologist
- Ivan Sotirov (1935–2025), Bulgarian footballer
- Ivan Sotirov (politician) (born 1963), Bulgarian engineer and politician
- Tsvetana Sotirova (born 1939), Bulgarian cross-country skier
- Zakhari Sotirov (born 1973), Bulgarian ski jumper

== See also ==
- Angel Sotirov Savov (1925–1990), Bulgarian actor
- Petar Sotirov Mihtarski (born 1966), Bulgarian retired football player and manager
