= Ángel Martínez =

Ángel Martínez may refer to:

== Sports ==
- Ángel Martínez (footballer, born 1965), Mexican football manager and former defender
- Angel Martínez (footballer, born 1983), Paraguayan football centre-back
- Ángel Martínez (footballer, born 1986), Spanish football midfielder
- Ángel Martínez (footballer, born 1991), Spanish football defender
- Ángel Martínez (baseball) (born 2002), Dominican baseball player
- Ángel Floro Martínez (1938–2024), Spanish football official

== Politics ==
- Ángel Pérez Martínez (born 1954), Spanish politician
- Ángel Viera Martínez (1915–2005), Puerto Rican politician
- Angel Rios Martinez (born 1952), official chronicler of Blanca, Murcia, Spain
- Ángel Chayanne Martínez (born 1964), American politician

== See also ==
- Ángel Martínez Casado (born 1947), Dominican friar and PhD in History and Theology.
