= Metodiev =

Metodiev is a Bulgarian surname. Notable people with the surname include:

- Angel Metodiev (1921–1984), Bulgarian painter
- Veselin Metodiev (born 1957), Bulgarian politician
- Vladislav Metodiev (born 1980), Bulgarian wrestler
- Vasil Metodiev (1935–2019), Bulgarian footballer
