= Ángel Romero =

Ángel Romero may refer to:

- Angel Romero (guitarist) (born 1956), Spanish guitarist
- Ángel Romero (music journalist), Spanish world music journalist
- Ángel Romero (cyclist) (1932–2007), Mexican cyclist and politician
- Ángel Romero (footballer) (born 1992), Paraguayan footballer
- Ángel Romero Díaz (born 1979), Spanish writer and politician
