= Ángel Alonso =

Ángel Alonso may refer to:

- Ángel Alonso (volleyball) (born 1967), Spanish volleyball player
- Angel David Alonso (born 1985), Paraguayan footballer
- Pichi Alonso (Àngel Alonso Herrera, born 1954), Spanish footballer
- Angel Alonso (Grammy winner, song writer, born 1964)
