= Ángel Sertucha =

Spanish footballer (1931–2019)

Personal information
- Full name: Ángel Sertucha Ereñozaga
- Date of birth: 27 January 1931
- Place of birth: Gatika, Spain
- Date of death: 6 April 2019 (aged 88)
- Place of death: Mungia, Spain
- Height: 1.80 m (5 ft 11 in)
- Position: Centre-back

Youth career
- 1944–1945: Mungia

Senior career*
| Years | Team | Apps | (Gls) |
- Begoña
- Mungia
| 1954–1961 | Athletic Bilbao | 18 | (0) |
| 1954–1956 | → Sestao (loan) | 57 | (1) |
| 1956–1957 | → Osasuna (loan) | 30 | (0) |
| 1962–1963 | Béjar Industrial | | |
| 1963–1968 | Sabadell | 123 | (0) |
- Azkoyen
| Total | | 228 | (1) |

Managerial career
- Mungia
- * Club domestic league appearances and goals

Ángel Sertucha Ereñozaga (27 January 1931 – 6 April 2019), simply known as Sertu, was a Spanish footballer. Mainly a central defender, he could also operate as a defensive midfielder.

== Football career ==
Born in Gatika in 1931, Province of Biscay, Basque Country, since he was a child he knew that he wanted to be a professional footballer. He started his football career with 14 years in the modest team CD Begoña of Bilbao. Then, he went to CD Mungia, to continue his formation and in the 1954–55 season he signed up by the Sestao Sport Club. Then he played in first Division teams like Athletic Bilbao, CE Sabadell FC, CA Osasuna, CD Azkoyen, etc., due to a severe Achilles heel injury when 39 years old.

Angel Sertucha resumed his career in the First División and in the Second division of then Spanish league, being the captain CE Sabadell FC, being an undisputed starter during most of his stay and eventually gaining club captaincy.

== Personal life ==
Angel Sertucha's retirement was not his last moment in football; after his retirement in 1969, he worked as a football coach in his first team, Mungia. When he was in his third season, he decided this was not his place and his choice of professional career, so he decided to give up completely the life around football to open a tavern in the same city, "Mungia", and to spend time with his wife and his son and daughters.
