= Ángel Hernández =

Ángel Hernández may refer to:

- Ángel Hernández (umpire) (born 1961), former Major League Baseball umpire
- Ángel Hernández (long jumper) (born 1966), Spanish athlete
- Ángel Hernández (boxer) (born 1975), Mexican light middleweight boxer
- Ángel Guillermo Heredia Hernández (born 1975), Mexican sports coach and former discus thrower
- Ángel Cedillo Hernández (born 1960), Mexican politician
- Ángel García Hernández (1899–1930), Spanish soldier
- Ángel Hernández (gymnast) (born 1995), Colombian gymnast
- Ángel G. Hernández, (1890–1971) Honduran politician
