= Angela Robinson =

Angela Robinson may refer to:

- Angela Robinson (director) (born 1971), American film and television director
- Angela Robinson (actress) (born 1963), American actress and singer

== See also ==
- Angel Robinson (disambiguation)
