= Anahera =

Anahera is a given name. It is a Māori transliteration of the name Angel. Notable people with the name include:

== People ==
- Anahera Herbert-Graves (born 1956), former chief executive officer of Te Runanga-a-Iwi o Ngāti Kahu
- Anahera Morehu, New Zealand librarian and archivist

== Fictional characters ==
- Anahera Samuels, fictional character from the New Zealand television soap opera Shortland Street

== See also ==
- "Anahera," by Ferry Corsten on his album Gouryella
