= Ángel Díaz =

Ángel Díaz is the name of:

== People in sports ==
- Ángel Luis Rodríguez Díaz (born 1987), Spanish football (soccer) player
- Ángel Gastón Díaz (born 1981), Argentine football (soccer) player
- Ángel Díaz (athlete), Guatemalan decathlete who, among other things, competed in the 1983 World Championships in Athletics – Men's decathlon

== People in public service ==
- Ángel Romero Díaz (born 1979), social worker, politician, and writer-journalist from Spain
- Ángel Díaz de Entresotos (1927–2009), Spanish politician and former President of Cantabria

== Other people ==
- Ángel Díaz Balbín (1955–1986), Peruvian convicted murderer and suspected serial killer
- Ángel Díaz (singer) (1929–1998), Argentine tango singer
- Ángel Nieves Díaz (1951–2006), American convict

(in Spanish customs for surnames: the first name is the paternal family surname; the second name is the maternal family surname)
