= Ángel Robles =

Ángel Robles may refer to:

- Ángel Robles (Spanish footballer) (born 1982), Spanish football centre-back
- Ángel Robles (footballer, born 2001), Mexican football forward for Puebla
