= Ángel Hernando =

Ángel Hernando (born 1959 in Huelva), is a professor at the University of Huelva.

== Biography ==
He is a professor at the University of Huelva, specialist in evolutionary psychology and education, and media education. He is the associate editor of Comunicar Journal, which was ranked in 2015 in the eleventh position in the world and first in Spanish of CiteScore in the category of cultural studies with a score of 1.93. In the Integrated Classification of Scientific Journals it is positioned in the highest category, the A + Excellence, in which those located in the first quartile of the categories of the Journal Citation Reports are positioned. He is also a member of scientific councils of other journals such as Apuntes de Psicología. He is a researcher at the Agora research group at the University of Huelva, a member of Comunicar Group and the Red Interuniversitaria Euroamericana de Investigación sobre Competencias Mediáticas para la Ciudadanía (ALFAMED). He has also participated in several research projects for the Ministry of Science and Technology, Interreg III, E-learning, Lengthening and INTI of the European Union.

== Teaching practice ==
He has practiced professionally the three levels of the educational system, being member of the teaching staff in primary education (1981–1996), secondary education and university. He has a PhD in psychology, a degree in psychology and psychopedagogy and a diploma in teaching. The first professional practice at the university took place in 2003 as associate professor; between 1996 and 2008 he served as a professor of the specialty of educational guidance in secondary education, and from 2008 to 2012 as an official in the Services Commission, until the ownership of the university in 2012. He teaches at the degrees of psychology and social education and in the next masters: - communication and audiovisual education, gender studies, identities and citizenship, general health psychology, secondary education, and belongs to the doctorate programs: communication, interdisciplinary gender studies, social and educational sciences and health sciences, where he has directed numerous doctoral and master's theses.

== Publications ==
His works are mainly focused on evolutionary psychology and education as well as educommunication, highlighting the publication of a large number of articles, books and book chapters.
