= Ángel Molinari =

Puerto Rican footballer

Personal information
- Full name: Ángel Gabriel Molinari Soto
- Date of birth: July 18, 2000 (age 26)
- Place of birth: Carolina, Puerto Rico
- Height: 1.83 m (6 ft 0 in)
- Position: Goalkeeper

Team information
- Current team: Westchester United F.C.

Youth career
- –2018: Manizales Star Gold CDF
- 2018–2019: Once Caldas
- 2020: Mirabelli SA

Senior career*
Years	Team	Apps	(Gls)
2020	Satélite Norte FC		
2021	Westchester United F.C.		

International career^{‡}
2019–	Puerto Rico	3	(0)
- * Club domestic league appearances and goals ‡ National team caps and goals as of 14:24, 19 January 2021 (UTC)

Ángel Gabriel Molinari Soto (born July 18, 2000) is a Puerto Rican football player who currently plays as a goalkeeper for Westchester United F.C.

== Club career ==
Until October 2018 Molinari played for Semilleros Manizales Star Gold Club de Fútbol when he went on trial in Colombia. He joined Once Caldas of the Categoría Primera A in 2018 and 2019. In 2020 he joined Satélite Norte FC of the Copa Simón Bolívar, the second-tier league of Bolivia. In August 2021 he signed with Westchester United F.C. of the United Premier Soccer League.

== Career statistics ==
=== International ===
As of matches played 19 January 2021.

National team	Year	Apps	Goals
Puerto Rico	2019	3	0
Total		3	0
