= Ángel Herrera =

Ángel Herrera may refer to:

- Ángel Herrera Oria (1886–1968), Spanish journalist, politician, Catholic lay leader and later priest, bishop and cardinal
- Ángel Herrera Vera (born 1957), Cuban boxer
- Ángel Aguirre Herrera (born 1984), Mexican PRD politician
- Ángel Maria Herrera (1859–1948), Panamanian educator

== See also ==
- Ángel Herrero (disambiguation)
