= Ángel Herrero =

Ángel Herrero may refer to:

- Ángel Herrero (footballer, born 1942), Spanish footballer
- Ángel Herrero (footballer, born 1949), Spanish footballer

== See also ==
- Ángel Herrera (disambiguation)
