= Ángel Leonidas Araújo Chiriboga =

Ecuadorian composer, poet, tax collector and hotelier

Ángel Leónidas Araújo Chiriboga (1900–1993) was an Ecuadorian composer, poet, tax collector and hotelier, best known for his contributions to the pasillo genre.

He was born in Quito, one of the ten children of Colonel Don Ángel Felipe Araújo y Ordóñez of Riobamba, and his wife, Obdulia Elisa Chiriboga y Gonzáles. As an infant, he returned to Riobamba with his parents and siblings. He composed his first song at the age of thirteen. In 1918 (still a teenager), along with fellow writers Miguel Ángel León and Gerardo Falconí, he founded the magazine Acuarela (Watercolor).

In 1919, El Telégrafo newspaper of Guayaquil awarded him an Honorable Mention for his poem Muerta. Additionally, his poems were published in the newspaper Los Andes de Riobamba, and in the magazines Ensayos, Savia, and Semana Gráfica of Guayaquil.

In the 1920s, he encouraged his friend, the composer and draftsman Rubén Uquillas Fernández, to come to Riobamba. Uquillas Fernández composed, among other works, the famous pasillo Tatuaje, with lyrics by Chula Paris de Aguirre. In 1923, Araújo Chiriboga was appointed Tax Inspector by the Ministry of Finance, as a result of which he toured various provinces of Ecuador. He was also a prompter of the National Dramatic Company (1926–1927); editor-in-chief of the Estampa de Bogotá magazine; author of the collection of poems Huerto Olvidado (Riobamba, 1978). Several of his musical compositions were later performed and recorded at El Prado Station in Riobamba, by singer Carlota Jaramillo, his sister-in-law.

The pasillo Rebeldia is among his best-known compositions. Other famous songs include Almas gemelas, Amor grande y lejano, Cuando me miras, Nunca, Ojeras (No vuelvas), Tu olvido, Ojos negros, Plegaria, Solo, Alejandose, Alma solitaria, etc. Several of his poems were set to music by prominent Ecuadorian composers. Working in hotel management, he lived for four decades in Colombia, and then returned to Ecuador in 1974. Two years later, he composed his last pasillo Te vi llorar, recorded by Carlota Jaramillo with accompaniment by the Homero Hidrobo guitar troupe.

He published his autobiography in 1988, and died in Quito in 1993.
