= Ángel Gallardo =

Ángel Gallardo may refer to:

- Ángel Gallardo (civil engineer) (1867–1934), Argentine civil engineer, natural scientist, and politician
- Ángel Gallardo (golfer) (born 1943), Spanish golfer
- Ángel Ballesteros Gallardo (born 1940), Spanish poet and historian
- Ángel Gallardo (Buenos Aires Underground), a railway station in Argentina
