= Ángel Alfonso =

Cuban baseball player (born 1901)

- Infielder
- Born: 1901; Havana, Cuba
- Batted: Right Threw: Right

Negro league baseball debut
- 1924, for the Cuban Stars (West)

Last appearance
- 1930, for the Cuban Stars (West)
- Stats at Baseball Reference

Teams
- Cuban Stars (West) (1924–1926); Cuban Stars (East) (1927–1929); Cuban Stars (West) (1930)

Ángel Alfonso (1901 – death unknown), nicknamed "Cuco", was a Cuban infielder in the Negro leagues between 1924 and 1930.

A native of Havana, Cuba, Alfonso made his Negro leagues debut in 1969 with the Cuban Stars (West). He played with the club through 1926, then went on to spend the next three seasons with the Cuban Stars (East), and finished his career in 1930 back with the West club. He also played for Habana in the Cuban League in 1927.
