= Ángel Torres =

Ángel Torres may refer to:

- Ángel Torres (baseball) (1952–2025), Dominican baseball player
- Ángel Torres (footballer, born 1952), Colombian footballer
- Ángel Torres (footballer, born 2000), Colombian footballer
- Ángel Torres (author) (1928–2010), Cuban author, historian and sportswriter
- Ángel Torres (businessman) (born 1952), Spanish businessman
- Ángel Víctor Torres (born 1966), Spanish politician
