= Ángel Alonso (volleyball) =

Spanish volleyball player

Personal information
- Full name: Ángel Alonso Nieto
- Nickname: Ángel Nieto
- Nationality: Spanish
- Born: 2 August 1967 (age 59) Madrid, Spain

Volleyball information
- Position: Setter
- Number: 10

National team
- Years: Team
- 1992-1996: Spain

Ángel Alonso (born 2 August 1967) is a Spanish former volleyball player who competed in the 1992 Summer Olympics.
