= Ángel Gaud González =

Puerto Rican scientist

Angel Gaud Gonzalez
- Born: December 18, 1930; Mayaguez, Puerto Rico
- Occupation: professor
- Spouse: Elsie Vélez Valentín
- Children: (3) Carmen Gaud Vélez, María L. Gaud Velez and Ángel M. Gaud Vélez

Ángel Gaud González is one of the longest serving professors at the University of Puerto Rico at Mayaguez. For more than 50 years as professor of Physics, Math and Science.

== Biography ==
Born in Mayagüez, Puerto Rico. He studied Mechanical engineering, M.S. (1968) University of Puerto Rico at Mayagüez and J.D. (1980) Pontifical Catholic University of Puerto Rico.

== Career ==
Has been a lecturer and visiting professor at several institutions of higher education as: Pontifical Catholic University of Puerto Rico [1999].

== Family life ==
Married for more than 56 years to Mrs. Elsie Velez. They have 3 children and 7 grandsons.

== Accolades ==
- Distinguished Veteran Awarded by the Senate of Puerto Rico on November 7, 2008.
