= Angel Bravo Lorio =

Nicaraguan politician

Angel Bravo Lorio is a Nicaraguan politician, belonging to the Communist Party of Nicaragua. Bravio Lorio was injured during the student movement of 1959.

He was a member of the National Assembly 1984–1990.

He is a Central Committee member of the party.
