= Ángel Gómez (footballer, born 1994) =

Paraguayan footballer

Personal information
- Full name: Ángel Gómez
- Date of birth: 11 April 1994 (age 32)
- Place of birth: San Lorenzo, Paraguay
- Position: Forward

Youth career
- Cerro Porteño

Senior career*
Years	Team	Apps	(Gls)
2015	Cerro Porteño	1	(0)
- * Club domestic league appearances and goals

Ángel Gómez (born 11 April 1994) is a Paraguayan footballer who plays as a forward. He is currently a free agent.

== Career ==
Gómez started out in the youth ranks of Cerro Porteño. He first appeared for the club's senior squad during the 2015 Paraguayan Primera División season, making his debut professional appearance on 9 July during a loss to Deportivo Capiatá.

== Career statistics ==
Club statistics
Club	Season	League			Cup		League Cup		Continental (Note: Includes the Copa Libertadores)		Other		Total	
Club	Season	Division	Apps	Goals	Apps	Goals	Apps	Goals	Apps	Goals	Apps	Goals	Apps	Goals
Cerro Porteño	2015	Primera División	1	0	—		—		0	0	0	0	1	0
Career total			1	0	—		—		0	0	0	0	1	0
