= Angel Collinson =

American freestyle skier

Personal information
- Full name: Angel Collinson
- Born: 13 July 1990 (age 35) Utah, U.S.

Sport
- Country: United States
- Event: Freeride

Angel Jason Collinson, an American former professional free and big mountain skier, was the first woman to win the "Best Line" award at the Powder Magazine annual industry awards in 2015. That year, she starred in big-time ski film Paradise Waits, by Teton Gravity Research (TGR), in which she became the first woman to appear in a TGR finale. She was sponsored by The North Face as a big mountain skier. In 2021 she retired from skiing to focus on blue water sailing and lifestyle branding.
