= Ángel Cedillo Hernández =

Mexican politician

- Born: 1 October 1960 (age 65); Ecatepec de Morelos, State of Mexico, Mexico
- Occupation: Deputy
- Political party: PRD

Ángel Cedillo Hernández (born 1 October 1960) is a Mexican politician affiliated with the PRD. As of 2013 he served as Deputy of the LXII Legislature of the Mexican Congress representing the State of Mexico.
