= Homero Hidrobo =

Ecuadorian classical guitarist

Hidrobo (left) with Los Brillantes

Homero Hidrobo Ojeda (October 2, 1939- August 5, 1979) was an Ecuadorian classical guitarist and one of Ecuador's best known guitarists of the 20th century. He was also accomplished in other genres such as popular and folk music.

Hidrobo performed with his father and uncle in his youth. In 1954 he formed the quartet Guanabara y, más tarde, and later the trio Los Latinos del Ande. Throughout the late 1950s and early 1960s they performed all over the Americas, North, Central and Southern. In 1962 the group evolved into a group known as the Los 4 Brillantes or Los Brillantes a group which received notable recognition in the 1960s and released a number of recordings often from Fadisa Studios in Quito.

Amongst his recitals or adaptions are J.S. Bach's "Ciaccona"; "The Cathedral" by Agustin Barrios Mangoré, and "La Maja de Goya" by Granados. His arrangement of the song "Canta Cuando Me Ausente" (Sing, Though I Be Absent) composed by his father Marco Tulio Hidrobo received much acclaim.

According to the noted Spanish classic guitarist Andrés Segovia who described him as "The best guitarist of the Americas". "Homero Hidrobo has been an untiring explorer of that constellation of harmonies that captures the sweet enchantment of music. His sensitivity and craftsmanship of his interpretation makes of Hidrobo a great example of permanent overcoming craftsmanship. His disciplined work it is oriented to discover the true face of the Renaissance, Baroque, Romanticism and along with the music of America, and Ecuadorian music in particular" .

He died on August 5, 1979, only aged 39 from chronic liver disease.
