= Satélite Norte F.C. =

Bolivian football club

Satélite Norte FC
- Full name: Satélite Norte Fútbol Club
- Ground: Estadio Samuel Vaca Jimenez; Warnes, Bolivia
- Capacity: 10,000
- Manager: Juan Carlos Farah
- League: Copa Simón Bolívar
- Website: https://www.facebook.com/Sat%C3%A9lite-NORTE-FC-102767171631357/

Satélite Norte FC is a Bolivian football club based in Warnes which currently plays in the Copa Simón Bolívar, the second tier competition in the country. The club plays its home matches at the 10,000-seat Estadio Samuel Vaca Jimenez. The current manager is Juan Carlos Farah.
