= Angel Arribas Lopez =

Spanish chess grandmaster (born 1993)

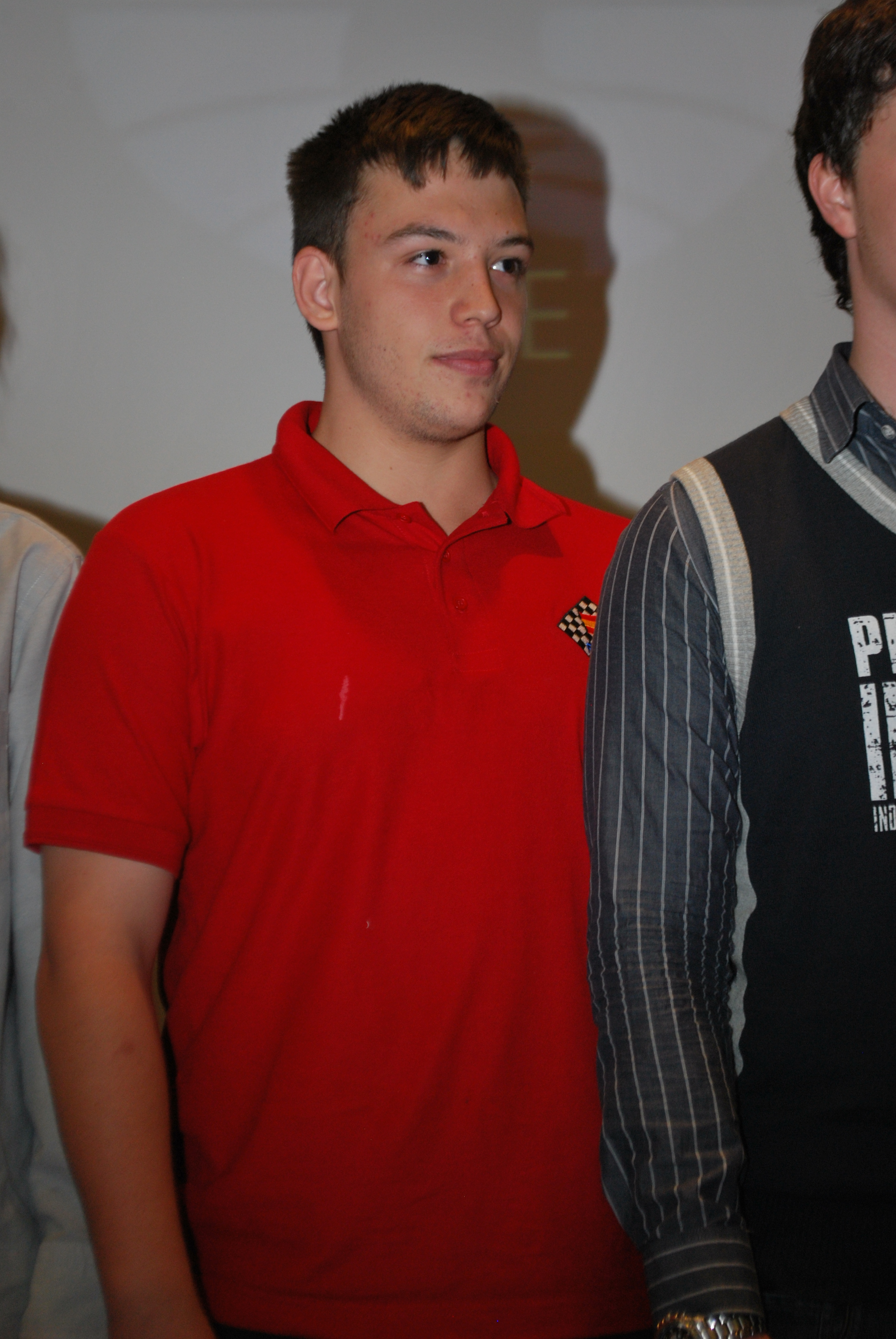
- Angel Arribas Lopez

Personal information
- Born: November 27, 1993 (age 32) Madrid, Spain

Chess career
- Country: Spain
- Title: Grandmaster (2014)
- FIDE rating: 2425 (July 2026)
- Peak rating: 2559 (August 2015)

Angel Arribas Lopez (born November 27, 1993, in Madrid, Spain) is a Spanish chess grandmaster who was the youngest player to earn the FIDE Master title in Spain.

== Career ==
He became a FIDE Master in 2007 at the age of 13. He earned the International Master (IM) title in 2012 and grandmaster (GM) title in 2014.

He is a software engineer who obtained a master's degree in cybersecurity at the University of Texas at Dallas and played on the university's chess team.

== Notable tournaments ==
Tournament Name	Year	ELO	Points
CCCSA Fall IM 2019(Charlotte USA)	2019	2436	6.0
CCCSA Winter IM 2019(Charlotte USA)	2019	2472	7.0
26th Roquetas de Mar Open(Roquetas de Mar ESP)	2015	2537	7.0
3rd Lorca Open 2014(Lorca ESP)	2014	2537	6.0
ESP-ch U14(Linares)	2007	2292	7.5
