= Angel Rios Martinez =

Spanish writer

Angel Ríos Martínez (Blanca, Murcia, 1952) is a Spaniard who, together with Govert Westerveld, by the plenary of the municipality of Blanca on January 3, 2002 was unanimously appointed as Official Chronicler of Blanca, Murcia.

== Bibliography ==
(1)-Ríos Martínez, Ángel (1997). Blanca, una página de su historia: La Parroquia. ISBN 84-923424-0-4

(2) Ríos Martínez, Ángel en Govert Westerveld (1999). Blanca, una página de su historia: Época mora.

(3) Rios Martínez, Ángel (1999). Blanca, una página de sus historia: El Esparto. 141 pages.

(4) Ríos Martínez, Ángel (2006). Las tradiciones de Blanca. 36 pages.

(5) Ríos Martínez, Angel (2006). Los rosarios de la Aurora.

(6) Ríos Martínez, Ángel (2000). Blanca, una página de su historia: Crónica 2000. 193 pages.

(7) Ríos Martínez, Ángel (2001). Blanca, una página de su historia: Crónica 2001. 291 pages.

(8) Ríos Martínez, Ángel (2001). José Fuentes Cano (El Padre Pepe). 24 pages.

(9) Ríos Martínez, Ángel (2002). Blanca, una página de su historia: Crónica 2002. 331 pages.

(10) Ríos Martínez, Ángel (2003). Blanca, una página de su historia: Crónica 2003. 136 pages.

(11) Ríos Martínez, Ángel (2004). Blanca, una página de su historia: Crónica 2004. 268 pages.

(12) Ríos Martínez, Ángel (2005). Blanca, una página de su historia: Crónica 2005. 256 pages.

(13) Ríos Martínez, Ángel (2006). Blanca, una página de su historia: Crónica 2006. 224 pages.

(14) Ríos Martínez, Ángel (2006). ¡Alegría!, es Navidad.

(15) Ríos Martínez, Ángel (2007). Blanca, una página de su historia: Crónica 2007. 292 pages.

(16) Ríos Martínez, Ángel (2007). Los Rosarios de la Aurora. 32 pages.

(17) Ríos Martínez, Ángel (2007). Baño de la Cruz. 15 pages.

(18) Ríos Martínez, Ángel (2008). Blanca, una página de su historia: Crónica 2008. 171 pages.
