= Ángel Abel Mavil =

Mexican politician

- Born: 30 June 1966 (age 59); Xico, Veracruz, Mexico
- Occupation: Deputy
- Political party: PRI

Ángel Abel Mavil Soto (born 30 July 1966) is a Mexican politician affiliated with the PRI. Since 21 August 2013, he has served as Deputy of the LXII Legislature of the Mexican Congress representing Veracruz.
