= CD Mungia =

Association football club in Spain

Mungia
- Full name: Club Deportivo Mungia
- Founded: 1924
- Ground: Legarda, Mungia, Basque Country, Spain
- Capacity: 1,000
- President: Aitor Aurtenetxe
- Manager: Iñigo Dueñas
- League: Preferente
- 2024–25: Preferente, 10th of 18
Home colours	Away colours

Club Deportivo Mungia is a Spanish football team based in Mungia, Biscay, in the autonomous community of Basque Country. Founded in 1924, they play in Preferente, holding home matches at Campo de Fútbol Legarda with a capacity of 1,000 spectators.

== Season to season ==
Season	Tier	Division	Place	Copa del Rey
1943–44	5	2ª Reg.	6th	
1944–45	5	2ª Reg.	6th	
1945–46	5	2ª Reg.	3rd	
1946–47	5	2ª Reg.	4th	
1947–48	5	2ª Reg.	3rd	
1948–49	5	2ª Reg.	3rd	
1949–50	5	2ª Reg.	13th	
1950–51	6	3ª Reg.	3rd	
1951–52	6	3ª Reg.	2nd	
1952–53	5	2ª Reg.	11th	
1953–54	6	3ª Reg.	5th	
1954–55	6	3ª Reg.	5th	
1955–56	6	3ª Reg.	8th	
1956–1969	DNP			
1969–70	6	2ª Reg.	10th	
1970–71	6	2ª Reg.	2nd	
1971–72	5	1ª Reg.	6th	
1972–73	5	1ª Reg.	4th	
1973–74	4	Reg. Pref.	12th	
1974–75	4	Reg. Pref.	6th	

Season	Tier	Division	Place	Copa del Rey
1975–76	4	Reg. Pref.	9th	
1976–77	4	Reg. Pref.	3rd	
1977–78	4	3ª	11th	
1978–79	4	3ª	14th	
1979–80	4	3ª	15th	Third round
1980–81	4	3ª	12th	
1981–82	4	3ª	20th	
1982–83	5	Reg. Pref.	3rd	
1983–84	5	Reg. Pref.	6th	
1984–85	5	Reg. Pref.	6th	
1985–86	5	Reg. Pref.	9th	
1986–87	5	Reg. Pref.	1st	
1987–88	4	3ª	7th	
1988–89	4	3ª	8th	
1989–90	4	3ª	4th	
1990–91	4	3ª	5th	
1991–92	4	3ª	13th	First round
1992–93	4	3ª	7th	
1993–94	4	3ª	15th	
1994–95	4	3ª	20th	

Season	Tier	Division	Place	Copa del Rey
1995–96	5	Terr. Pref.	19th	
1996–97	6	1ª Terr.	9th	
1997–98	6	1ª Terr.	5th	
1998–99	6	1ª Terr.	1st	
1999–2000	5	Terr. Pref.	19th	
2000–01	6	1ª Terr.	4th	
2001–02	6	1ª Terr.	6th	
2002–03	6	Pref.	6th	
2003–04	6	Pref.	5th	
2004–05	6	Pref.	8th	
2005–06	6	Pref.	13th	
2006–07	7	1ª Div.	4th	
2007–08	7	1ª Div.	2nd	
2008–09	6	Pref.	14th	
2009–10	6	Pref.	11th	
2010–11	6	Pref.	5th	
2011–12	6	Pref.	5th	
2012–13	6	Pref.	9th	
2013–14	6	Pref.	17th	
2014–15	7	1ª Div.	7th	

Season	Tier	Division	Place	Copa del Rey
2015–16	7	1ª Div.	10th	
2016–17	7	1ª Div.	3rd	
2017–18	7	1ª Div.	5th	
2018–19	7	1ª Div.	3rd	
2019–20	7	1ª Div.	8th	
2020–21	DNP			
2021–22	8	1ª Div.	3rd	
2022–23	8	1ª Div.	1st	
2023–24	7	Pref.	4th	
2024–25	7	Pref.	10th	
2025–26	7	Pref.		

- 13 seasons in Tercera División
