= Angel Wanjiru =

Kenyan musician

- Born: Angel Wanjiru Ngugi; 2003 (age 22–23)
- Occupation: Musician
- Years active: 2016–present
- Award: MTM Choice Awards – Founders Award (2019)

Angel Wanjiru Ngugi (born 2003) is a Kenyan musician, born with a congenital disorder called hydrocephalus. On 16 December 2019, she received the Founders Award at MTM Choice Awards in the United Kingdom.

== Biography ==
Wanjiru was born in 2003, with a congenital disorder called hydrocephalus. Her mother is Anne Ngugi, a Kenyan BBC presenter. As a result of her condition, she has a bigger head than other people. Her condition exposes her to a lot of bullying, ridicule and health problems. However, she released her first song called Nataka Jua, (meaning, I want to know) in 2016 and produced her first album at the age of 14.

== Discography ==
- Nataka Jua (2016)
- Story of My Life ( 2019)

== Collaborative songs ==
- Niko sawa with Audrey
- Moyo Safi with Anne Ngugi and Denno
- Typu Yako Mungu Hakuna with Anne Ngugi

== Awards ==
- 2019 - She won the Against All Odds Category of the Voice Achievers Award
- 2019 - She received the Founders Award at MTM Choice Awards in the United Kingdom
