= Ángel Aguirre =

Ángel Aguirre may refer to:

- Ángel Aguirre Rivero (born 1956), Mexican politician, governor of Guerrero from 2011 to 2014
- Ángel Aguirre Herrera (1984–2017), Mexican politician, federal deputy, son of the above
