= Ángel Martín =

Angel Martin may refer to:

- Ángel Martín (actor) (born 1977), Spanish actor, TV presenter, comedian and screenwriter
- Ángel Martín (footballer, born 1978), Andorran football midfielder
- Ángel Martín González (born 1964), Spanish football defensive midfielder
- Ángel Martín González (chess player) (born 1953), Spanish chess player
- Angel Martín Taboas (1918–2023), Puerto Rican jurist
- Evelyn "Angel" Martin, a fictional character played by Stuart Margolin on The Rockford Files
