= Ángel Gómez (footballer, born 1985) =

Argentine footballer

Personal information
- Full name: Ángel Lorenzo Gómez
- Date of birth: 4 October 1985 (age 41)
- Place of birth: Concepción del Uruguay, Argentina
- Height: 1.74 m (5 ft 8 1/2 in)
- Position: Midfielder

Team information
- Current team: Atlético Uruguay

Senior career*
Years	Team	Apps	(Gls)
2002	Club Don Bosco		
2003–2005	Gimnasia y Esgrima	14	(1)
2005–2006	Club Don Bosco		
2006–2013	Atlético Uruguay		
2013–2014	Sportivo Rivadavia	6	(1)
2014–2015	Juventud Unida	11	(0)
2016–	Atlético Uruguay		
- * Club domestic league appearances and goals as of 00:32, 25 October 2018 (UTC)

Ángel Lorenzo Gómez (born 4 October 1985) is an Argentine footballer who plays as a midfielder for Atlético Uruguay.

== Career ==
Gimnasia y Esgrima became Gómez's second career club in 2003, with the midfielder signing from Club Don Bosco. He made three professional appearances for Gimnasia y Esgrima throughout the 2003–04 Primera B Nacional campaign. They suffered relegation in that season, with Gómez subsequently netting one goal in eleven Torneo Argentino A appearances over one season. 2005 saw Gómez return to Club Don Bosco, prior to agreeing to join Atlético Uruguay of Torneo Argentino B. He remained for a total of seven years, featuring for them in Torneo Argentino B and Torneo Argentino C; following relegation in 2007.

Gómez departed in 2013, joining Sportivo Rivadavia. One goal in six appearances followed for Sportivo Rivadavia in Torneo Argentino B. Gómez joined Torneo Federal A's Juventud Unida in June 2014. He made his debut on 24 August during a 1–0 victory at home to Sarmiento, which was the first of five games in the 2014 campaign; which ended with promotion to Primera B Nacional. In 2015, Gómez made just one start, versus Central Córdoba, as Juventud Unida qualified for the 2015–16 Copa Argentina. Gómez left to rejoin Atlético Uruguay at the conclusion of that season.

== Career statistics ==
As of 25 October 2018.

Club statistics
Club	Season	League			Cup (Note: Includes the Copa Argentina)		League Cup		Continental		Other		Total	
Club	Season	Division	Apps	Goals	Apps	Goals	Apps	Goals	Apps	Goals	Apps	Goals	Apps	Goals
Gimnasia y Esgrima	2003–04	Primera B Nacional	3	0	0	0	—		—		0	0	3	0
Gimnasia y Esgrima	2004–05	Torneo Argentino A	11	1	0	0	—		—		0	0	11	1
Gimnasia y Esgrima	Total		14	1	0	0	—		—		0	0	14	1
Sportivo Rivadavia	2013–14	Torneo Argentino B	6	1	0	0	—		—		0	0	6	1
Juventud Unida	2014	Torneo Federal A	5	0	1	0	—		—		0	0	6	0
Juventud Unida	2015	Primera B Nacional	6	0	0	0	—		—		0	0	6	0
Juventud Unida	Total		11	0	1	0	—		—		0	0	12	0
Career total			20	1	1	0	—		—		0	0	21	1
