= Angel Delgado Fuentes =

Cuban visual artist

Angel Delgado
- Ángel Delgado
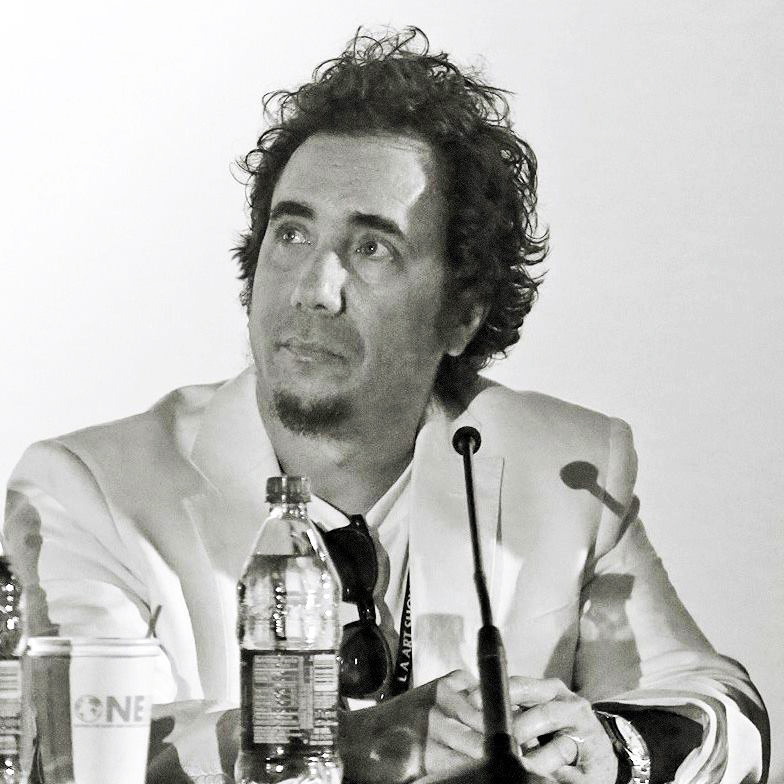
- Born: July 3, 1965 (age 61); Havana, Cuba
- Education: Escuela Nacional de Bellas Artes "San Alejandro"; Instituto Superior de Arte
- Known for: Visual art; performance art; installation art
- Notable work: La esperanza es lo último que se está perdiendo (1990)
- Awards: Museum of Latin American Art Award (2008)
- Website: www.angel-delgado.net

Angel Delgado is a Cuban visual artist who lives in Long Beach, California.

== Biography ==
Delgado studied at the Elementary School of Visual Arts of Havana, between 1976 and 1980. He graduated from the Escuela Nacional de Bellas Artes "San Alejandro" in 1984 and studied from 1984 to 1986 at the Instituto Superior de Arte in Havana. The work of Angel Delgado, goes around a point: the freedom of the individual or the lack of this, his artwork is based fundamentally on the limitations, restrictions, prohibitions, controls and lack of freedoms that are imposed on the human being within the society. In May 1990, Delgado created a performance titled "La esperanza es lo último que se está perdiendo" in the group exhibition "El Objeto Esculturado" at Centro de Desarrollo de Artes Visuales, that led to the prison, where he spent six months of deprivation of freedom, this experience marked his life and his work. In 2005, he left Cuba and decided to stay permanently in Mexico City. He lived there until 2013, when he decided to immigrate to the United States. Delgado currently lives and works in Long Beach, CA.

== Selected individual exhibitions ==
- Absent Speech, Building Bridges Art Exchange. Santa Monica, California. 2017
- Discurso Ausente, Galeria Seis Seis. Havana, Cuba. 2017
- Headlines, Galería Omar Alonso. Puerto Vallarta, Mexico, 2017
- Revision, Aluna Art Foundation, Miami, Florida. 2015
- Constancy, Amanda Harris Gallery. Las Vegas, Nevada. 2014
- Uncomfortable Landscape, Building Bridges Art Exchange. Santa Monica, California. 2014
- Inside Outside, Jonathan Ferrara Gallery. New Orleans, Louisiana. 2011
- Limite Contínuo, Couturier Gallery. Los Angeles, California. 2009
- Wake Up, Artane Gallery. Istanbul, Turkey. 2007
- Constancias, Galería Nina Menocal. Mexico. 2006
- Memorias acumuladas, Galería Fucares. Madrid, Spain. 2004
- Sombra interior, Galería Nina Menocal. Mexico. 2003

== Collective exhibitions ==
- Unofficial, Kendall Art Center. Miami, Florida. 2018
- Domestic Anxieties, chapter 3 of "On the Horizon. Pérez Art Museum Miami. Miami, Florida. 2018
- Tatuare la Storia. Padiglione d'Arte Contemporanea. Milan, Italy, 2016
- An Island Apart: Cuban Artists in Exile. Miller Gallery at Carnegie Mellon University. Westerville, Ohio. 2016
- Mobility and Its Discontents, The 8th Floor. New York. 2015
- Apertura: Photography in Cuba Today, Chazen Museum of Art. Madison, Wisconsin. 2015
- 55 Premio Internazionale Bugatti Segantini, Nova Milanese (MB), 2014
- Neues Sehen – New Vision. Till Richter Museum. Germany. 2013
- Citizens of the World: Cuba in Queens. Queens Museum. Nueva York. 2013
- La Revolución no será televisada, Bronx Museum of the Arts. New York. 2012
- Video Cubano, Rubin Museum of Art. New York. 2011
- Arte no es Vida: Actions by Artists of the Americas, 1960-2000. Museo del Barrio. New York. 2008

== Awards and honors ==
In 2004, he obtained an artist residency at Mattress Factory in Pittsburgh, Pennsylvania. In 2008, he won the Museum of Latin American Art award in the category of sculpture and installation in Long Beach, California. In 2016, he is part of The Fountainhead Residency, Miami, FL. His work was acquired and it is now included in the collections of the Pérez Art Museum Miami.
