= Ángel Martínez (footballer, born 1965) =

Mexican footballer and manager

Personal information
- Full name: Ángel Alfonso Martínez Cervera
- Date of birth: 4 September 1965 (age 61)
- Place of birth: Piedras Negras, Coahuila, Mexico
- Position: Defender

Senior career*
Years	Team	Apps	(Gls)
1980–1981	Unión de Curtidores	19	(0)
1981–1982	Atlético Español	24	(3)
1984–1993	UANL	189	(1)

Managerial career
- 2007–2021: Tigres UANL Reserves and Academy
- * Club domestic league appearances and goals

Ángel Alfonso Martínez Cervera (born September 4, 1965) is a Mexican football manager and former player.

Martínez had a 17-year club football career, most of them playing for Tigres UANL. After he retired from playing football, Martínez became a coach. He began managing Tigres' under-17 side in 2019.
