= Ángel Herrero (footballer, born 1949) =

Spanish footballer

Personal information
- Full name: Ángel Herrero Herrero
- Date of birth: 19 September 1949 (age 77)
- Place of birth: Villabrágima, Spain
- Height: 1.75 m (5 ft 9 in)
- Position: Midfielder

Youth career
- Gallarta

Senior career*
Years	Team	Apps	(Gls)
1969–1971	Sestao		
1971–1977	Cádiz	104	(4)
Total		104	(4)
- * Club domestic league appearances and goals

Ángel Herrero Herrero (born 19 September 1949) is a Spanish former footballer who played as a midfielder.

== Football career ==
Born in Villabrágima, Province of Valladolid, Herrero started his senior career with Sestao Sport Club in Tercera División. In the 1971 summer he signed for Cádiz CF from Segunda División, going on to spend four seasons in the category.

Herrero retired as a professional in 1977, aged only 27.
