= Ángel Pelayo Gordillo =

Spanish politician

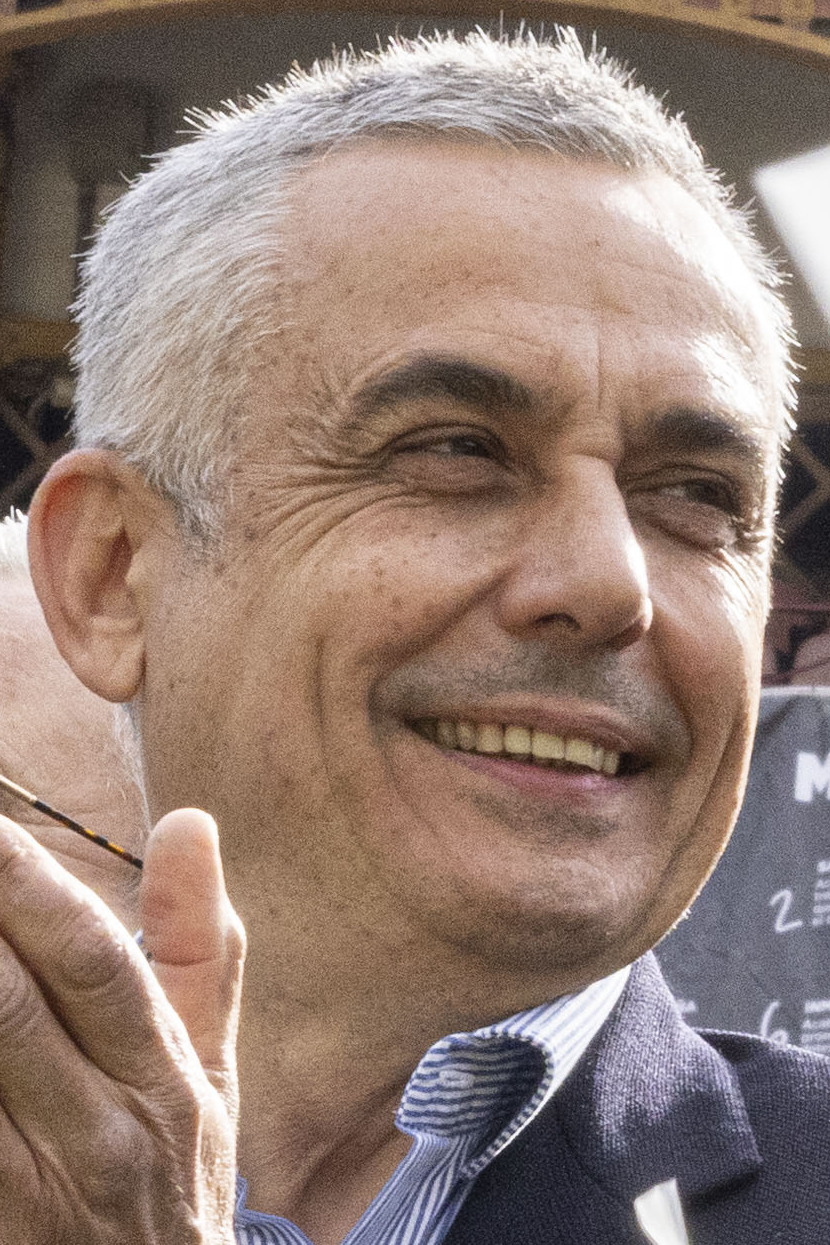

Ángel Pelayo Gordillo Moreno (born 1962) is a Spanish politician of the party Vox. He was elected to the Assembly of Extremadura and appointed to the Senate in 2023.

== Biography ==
Born in Mérida in Extremadura, Gordillo became the director and manager of an agricultural company. As of 2019, he had never married or had children.

As a member of the People's Party (PP) from 1990 to 2018, he was a member of the city council and deputy mayor. He was chosen as Vox's candidate for mayor of Mérida in the 2019 Spanish local elections, and his party took two seats on the council.

Gordillo was chosen as Vox's candidate for President of the Regional Government of Extremadura in the 2023 Extremaduran regional election. Vox entered the Assembly of Extremadura with five seats, which would allow it to form a majority government with the PP. Negotiations between the two parties stalled, allowing the Spanish Socialist Workers' Party (PSOE) to install its candidate for President of the Assembly, the role of speaker. PP leader María Guardiola went back on her word and formed a government with Vox, giving Gordillo's party control of the Ministry of Agriculture.

As part of the coalition agreement, Gordillo was designated a seat in the Senate of Spain. He maintained his seat in the regional assembly. In July 2024, Vox's national leader Santiago Abascal withdrew the party from all regional governments with the PP due to a row over immigration. The PP then asked Gordillo to resign his Senate seat due to the supporting pact being terminated.

Ahead of the 2025 Extremaduran regional election, Vox named Óscar Fernández as their lead candidate, while Gordillo would lead the party in the Senate. Fernádez led the list in the Cáceres constituency and Gordillo in Badajoz. The party grew from five seats to 11.
