= Ángel Pasta Muñuzuri =

Mexican politician

- Born: 5 March 1954 (age 72); Guerrero, Mexico
- Occupation: Politician
- Political party: PAN

Ángel Pasta Muñuzuri (born 5 March 1954) is a Mexican politician affiliated with the National Action Party. As of 2014 he served as Deputy of the LIX Legislature of the Mexican Congress as a plurinominal representative.
