= Angel Funes =

Screenwriter director and actor

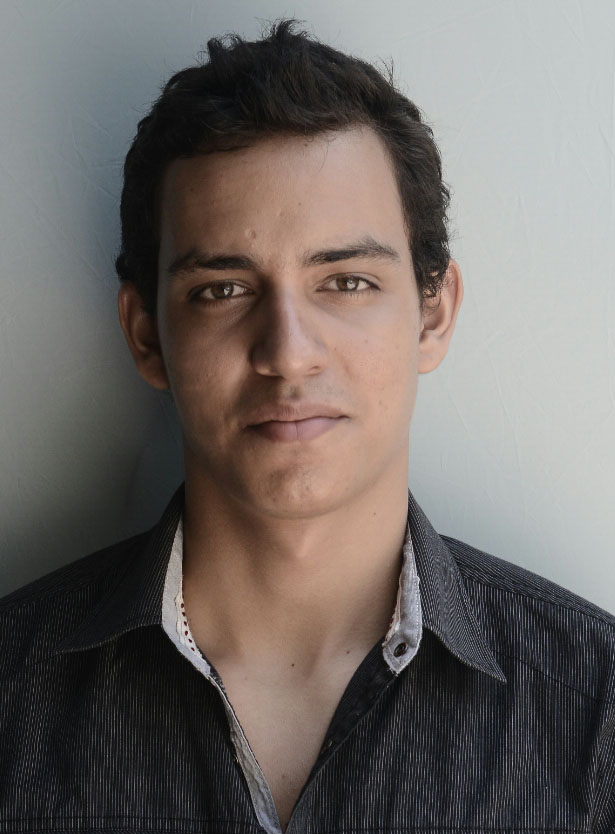
- Funes in 2016
- Born: San Pedro Sula, Honduras
- Occupations: Screenwriter, director, actor

Angel Funes (born in San Pedro Sula, Honduras) is a screenwriter, director and actor. He is known for his versatile performances in film and theater. He started to study filmmaking in 2009 through personal coaching from a Full Sail University Film Production graduate, David Yacaman. In 2008, together with his brother Juan Funes, won 1st place on " The Shortest Fear" Short Film Festival.

== Career ==
His first participation as an actor on a feature film was in "Unos Pocos con Valor" (2010), where he played a Young Delinquent named Chekko. This was a character that the director created for him because he liked his performance in the casting and wanted him in the movie, but had no available characters for him.

In 2012, he won 2nd place on the Central American Cor3 Short Film Festival with his short film "Insurance", where his father played the main character.

His acting formal education started in 2013, when he enrolled in the prestigious acting school CC-ArtEs located in his city. This same year, he started acting on his second feature film "Cuando te Hablen de Amor" (Release Date - 03/2016), and a Soap Opera that was cancelled during production.

In 2014, he was hired by Proyecto Teatral Futuro to play three characters on the Christmas play

Jacob Marley, The Ghost of Christmas Yet to Come, and Fred's Friend. Next year, he kept working with the company with different short plays: "El Bache" (Written by his brother and himself), "Concierto a Dos Bocas" and was part of Dario Fo's Trilogy, where he played The Blind in "La Moralidad del Ciego y el Tullido".

In March 2015, he quit theater to focus on his new startup company "Black Ink Pictures". He started to do projects and had the idea of the company back in eight grade, where he wrote short stories, created comic books with friends and made videos. All of these with the credit of Black Ink Pictures. He stuck with the name and now it is a real startup, with the main focus of Film.

This same year, he started to produce his first feature film together with his brother Juan Funes and his friend Andres Escobar, named "Lo Mio es el Baile". The production was stopped due to a main character's health condition and financial shortage, however, Black Ink Pictures will keep filming this movie in 2017.

He acted on his third feature film named "Fuerzas de Honor" in May 2015, and the movie was released in January 2016. He played a soldier: Lieutenant García. He had to cut his 10in long hair for this character and lived in the army for about a month, where he received training. He learned to shoot, all the commands, basic movements, strategies and even had to do kitchen duty at 3:00am for the whole army.

On September 10, he started filming "4 Catrachos en Apuros" as the Director of Photography. He is also one of the producers and screenwriters of this motion picture. The expected release date is late January 2017.

He keeps working on the industry and is involved in several projects, shorts and feature films, that will be released in 2016 and 2017, including documentals that will help develop the country.

== See also ==
- Unos Pocos con Valor
- es:Cine en Honduras
- es:Guion cinematográfico
