= Ángel Sola =

Spanish musician

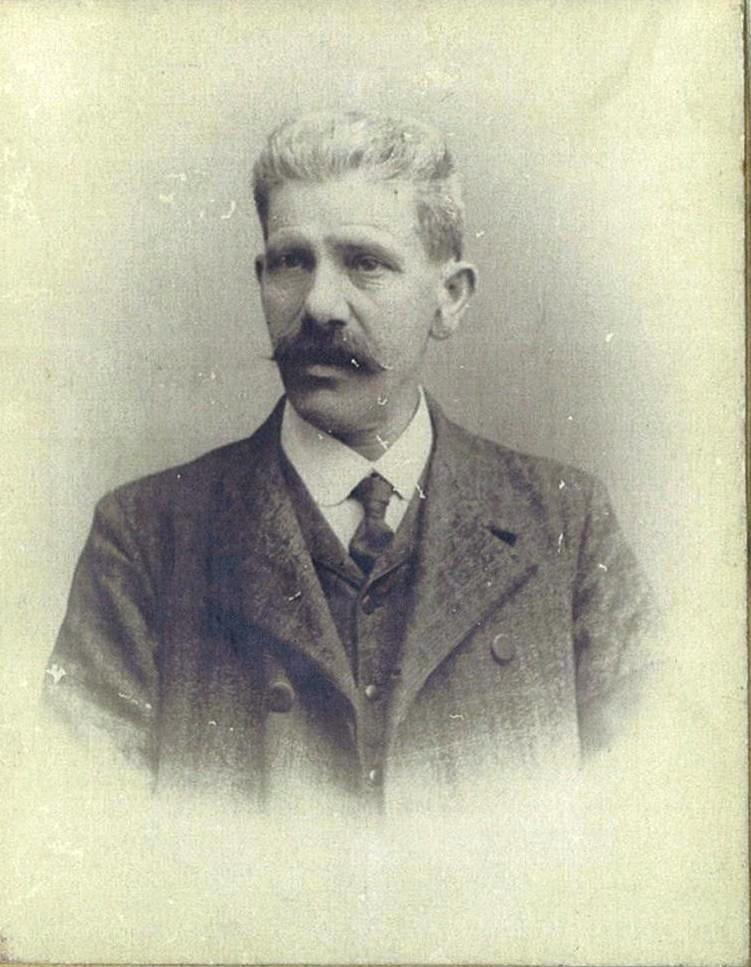

Ángel Sola Fuertes (1859 in Salillas de Jalón – 1910 in Morata de Jalón) was a Spanish musician. He is considered to be one of the greatest bandurria players of all time.
