= Ángel Núñez =

Paraguayan footballer

Ángel Núñez is a Paraguayan football defender who plays for Club R.I.3 Corrales in the Paraguayan División Intermedia.

== Career ==
=== Cerro Porteño PF ===
Núñez was part of the squads at Cerro Porteño PF. During the 2013 Primera División Paraguaya season, he appeared for the club's reserve-team. In 2014 División Intermedia season, Núñez formed part of the club's first-team. In 2015, he was part of the Cerro Porteño PF squad which reached the play-off stages of the Primera B Nacional.

=== 3 de Febrero ===
For the 2016 División Intermedia season, Núnez joined Ciudad del Este team 3 de Febrero. On 17 February, Diario Vanguardia announced him in the squad list for the 2016 season. In April, Núñez appeared as a substitute in the second half of a 4–1 win against Sportivo San Lorenzo. In August, Núñez was in the starting line up in a 2–1 home defeat against Resistencia. In September, Núñez started in a 1–0 home defeat against Deportivo Caaguazú and was replaced by Adolfo Miño in the 79th minute.

=== R.I.3 Corrales ===
On 18 March 2018, Núnez made his first league appearance in a 2–1 away victory against Resistencia.
