= Angel Gavrovski =

Macedonian painter (born 1942)

Angel Gavrovski (Macedonian: Ангел Гавровски; born 25 June 1942) is a Macedonian painter.

== Biography ==
Gavrovski was born in the village of Žilče, in Jegunovce Municipality. He graduated from the Faculty for Fine Arts in Belgrade in 1967. As one of the most prominent contemporary artists he became a member of DLUM - Macedonian Artists’ Association in 1968.

He was employed at Public high school of Fine Arts and Design in Skopje as a Professor of Professional Teaching 1945 - 2010.

During his work as an art teacher, he has realized three independent group exhibitions and participated in many art colonies. Some of those exhibits include:

- The Exhibition Graphics DLUM - January 2007
- DLUM-Graphics 2008 - November 2008
- Strumica Art Colony - January 2011
- The Art Gallery of the Society of Artists of Macedonia - November 2008
