= Ángel López =

Ángel López may refer to:

- Ángel López Jiménez (born 1955), Spanish astronomer
- Ángel López (footballer, born 1981), Spanish football right-back
- Ángel López (football manager) (born 1983), Spanish football manager for Volos
- Ángel López (rugby union) (born 1992), Spanish rugby union player
- Ángel López (footballer, born 1996), Mexican football midfielder
- Ángel López (footballer, born 1997), Mexican football forward for Malacateco
- Ángel López (footballer, born 2003), Spanish football right-back for Algeciras
