= Ángel Robles (Spanish footballer) =

Spanish footballer

Personal information
- Full name: Ángel Luis Robles Berengüí
- Date of birth: 20 April 1982 (age 44)
- Place of birth: Cehegín, Spain
- Height: 1.80 m (5 ft 11 in)
- Position: Centre back

Youth career
- Real Madrid

Senior career*
Years	Team	Apps	(Gls)
2001–2004	Real Madrid C		
2003–2006	Real Madrid B	57	(0)
2006–2007	Ponferradina	10	(0)
2007–2008	Lorca	27	(0)
2008–2009	Alzira	31	(0)
2009–2011	Roquetas	64	(2)
2011–2012	Dénia	18	(1)
2012–2016	UCAM Murcia	88	(2)
2016–2019	Jumilla	62	(3)
2019–2021	Lorca Deportiva	43	(0)
2021–2022	Cartagena UCAM	37	(0)
- * Club domestic league appearances and goals

Ángel Luis Robles Berengüí (born 20 April 1982) is a Spanish former footballer who played as a central defender.

== Club career ==
Born in Cehegín, Murcia, Robles graduated from Real Madrid's youth setup. He made his senior debuts with the C-team, playing several seasons in the Tercera División. He was promoted to the reserves in the Segunda División B in June 2003, and appeared in 22 matches during the promotion campaign.

Robles played his first match as a professional on 17 September 2005, coming on as a second-half substitute in a 1–2 home loss against CD Tenerife in the Segunda División. He appeared in 14 matches during the season, and subsequently joined SD Ponferradina in the same division in July of the following year.

In the 2007 summer Robles joined Lorca Deportiva CF in the third level. He continued to appear in the same division in the following campaigns, representing UD Alzira, CD Roquetas, CD Dénia, UCAM Murcia CF and FC Jumilla.
