= Angel Joy Chavis Rocker =

American guidance counselor and presidential candidate (1966–2003)

- Born: Angel Joy Chavis Rocker; April 29, 1966
- Died: February 25, 2003 (aged 36); Navarre Beach, Florida, United States
- Education: University of North Carolina at Greensboro; Georgia State University
- Political party: Republican

Angel Joy Chavis Rocker (April 29, 1966 – February 26, 2003) was an American politician and guidance counselor from Florida. In 1999, she became the first black woman to run for President of the United States as a Republican.

== Early life and education ==
Rocker grew up in High Point, North Carolina, and graduated from T. Wingate Andrews High School. Rocker attended and graduated from the University of North Carolina at Greensboro and received a master's degree in counseling from Georgia State University.

== Career ==
Rocker worked as a guidance counselor and lived in Fort Walton Beach, Florida. On March 23, 1999, she announced that she would be forming a presidential exploratory committee, hoping to receive the Republican nomination in the 2000 United States Presidential election.

With this announcement, she became the first black woman to run for President of the United States as a Republican. Rocker's campaign was seen as a long shot as she had very little campaign funding, name recognition, and no political experience, as she had not previously held elected office. Aspects of her platform included the creation of a flat tax, expanding medical care, and encouraging black influence and representation within the Republican party.

She said she wanted to test whether the Republicans were a "big tent or not". At the 1999 Alabama Republican Straw Poll, she said that she declared her candidacy to "articulate issues that attract Hispanics, African Americans, and other minorities" to the Republican party and that it is important to "articulate these issues in a positive rather than a negative manner", stating that her campaign was about inclusion within the party. George W. Bush would eventually go on to win the 2000 Republican primary and the general election against Al Gore.

Rocker died on February 25, 2003, in Navarre Beach, Florida, at the age of 36 following an elective surgery.

== See also ==
- Shirley Chisholm, the first black woman candidate for a major party's nomination, running as a Democrat
