= Angel Medina =

Angel Medina may refer to:

- Angel Medina (wrestler) (born 1970), "Spanish Angel" American police officer and former professional wrestler
- Angel Medina (artist) (born 1964), American comic book artist
