= Angel D'Meza =

Cuban baseball player (1877–1954)

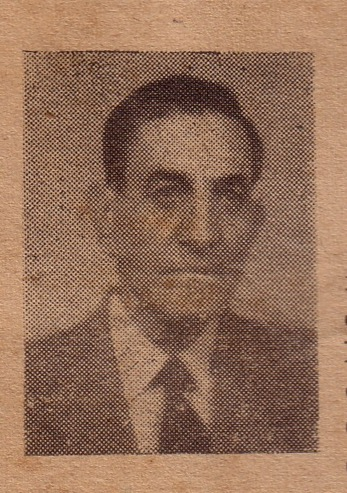
- Pitcher / Third baseman / Right fielder
- Born: 1877; Cuba
- Died: October 8, 1954 (aged 76–77)
- Batted: Right Threw: Right

Angel D'Meza (1877 – October 8, 1954) was a Cuban professional baseball pitcher, third baseman and right fielder in the Cuban League and Negro leagues. He played from 1902 to 1908 with several teams, including Fe, Almendares, San Francisco, Azul, and Habana.
