= Ángel Ballesteros Gallardo =

Spanish poet and historian

Ángel Ballesteros Gallardo, Spanish poet and historian (Gálvez 1940- ), lives in Talavera de la Reina, graduated with degrees in philosophy and linguistics. He is a member of the Royal Academy of Historic Sciences and Fine Arts of Toledo.

== Biography ==
Gallardo was born in Gálvez, Toledo, studied Philosophy and Languages and began his research in Barcelona. In 1973 he moved to Talavera de la Reina, Spainwhere he started an important task as historic investigator. His main subject of studies is the ancient festival called "Mondas", a Spring parade originating in the Celt Iberian period 2200 a.C. in this area. He also studied about others items concerning to the city past. Ballesteros wrote in La Voz del Tajo newspaper.

In 1983 he was decorated as 'Numerary advisor of the Provincial Institute of Toledian Studies and Investigation'.

Angel Ballesteros founded the Data Seminary of historic Study of Talavera de la Reina and its Lands and directed the "P. Juan de Mariana" Historic Institute. He is a university teacher in the UNED University.

His main poetical works are Precipitada Sangre (1970) (Hastened Blood), No sabe la muerte que se llama muerte (1974) (Death does not know that her name is Death), Cómo tuvo la sangre ilusiones (1982), (How the blood had illusions) and Igualada Derrota (1985) (Even Defeat).

As an Historian his principal works are Las Mondas de Talavera de la Reina, historia de una tradición (1980) (Mondas in Talavera de la Reina, History of a Tradition) or Talavera de la Reina, Ciudad de la Cerámica (1978) (Talavera de la Reina, City of Pottery), an enthusiastic guide of the city that was awarded with the "Everest prize".

He has written theater plays, the most important is about the Maristas, assassinated in Uganda Cosecha Enamorada (1998), (Loved Harvest).

He has been named as favourite son of the city of Talavera de la Reina
