= Angel Koritarov =

Bulgarian volleyball player (1941–2019)

Personal information
- Nationality: Bulgarian
- Born: 11 November 1941; Pernik, Bulgaria
- Died: 8 February 2019 (aged 77)

Sport
- Sport: Volleyball

Angel Koritarov (Bulgarian: Ангел Коритаров, 11 November 1941 – 8 February 2019) was a Bulgarian volleyball player. He competed at the 1964 Summer Olympics and the 1968 Summer Olympics.
