= Angel Stoyanov =

Angel Stoyanov may refer to:

- Angel Stoyanov (boxer) (born 1967), Bulgarian boxer
- Angel Stoyanov (ski jumper) (born 1958), Bulgarian ski jumper
- Angel Stoyanov (footballer) (born 1986), Bulgarian footballer
