= Ángel Moreno =

Ángel Moreno may refer to:

- Ángel Moreno (footballer) (born 1997), Spanish footballer
- Ángel Moreno (baseball) (born 1955), Mexican baseball player
