= Ángel Crego =

Spanish football manager (born 1964)

Personal information
- Full name: Ángel González Crego
- Date of birth: 28 September 1964 (age 62)
- Place of birth: Salamanca, Spain

Managerial career
- Years: Team
- 1986–1987: Sporting Garrido
- 1987–1988: Guijuelo
- 1988–1990: Ribert (youth)
- 1990–1991: Ribert
- 1991–1992: Béjar
- 1992–1994: Ribert
- 1994–1996: Béjar
- 1996–2000: Salmantino
- 2000: Salamanca
- 2000–2001: Castellón
- 2002–2003: Guijuelo
- 2004: Promesas Ponferrada
- 2004–2005: Salmantino
- 2008–2010: Guijuelo

Ángel González Crego (born 28 September 1964) is a Spanish football manager.
