= Ángel Romero Díaz =

Ángel Romero Díaz (born November 3, 1979, in Huelva) is a Spanish social worker, politician, columnist and writer. He is the secretary of social networks at the PSOE of Huelva. He is the director in the department of Institutional and Civil Relations of the Presidency of the Regional Government of Andalusia. In November 2014, he was ranked the third most influential politician of the PSOE on the website Klout, after Pedro Sánchez and Jose Antonio Rodríguez Salas.

== Early life ==
Díaz was born in Huelva in 1979. He grew up in Valdelamusa, a small city in Huelva. His father was a miner. Díaz was the youngest of six sons. He studied at the Cerro de Andévalo college and continued his studies at the Institute of Baccalaureate, The Rábida of Huelva, where he realized up to COU. He qualified in Social Work for the University of Huelva and as a University Expert in programs and policies for youth of the University of Valencia.

During his college years, Díaz worked as a waiter, disc-jockey, public relations consultant, hotel and catering business, mason, commercial insurance employee, agricultural worker and a consulting programmer.

== Career ==
In 2005, he worked as an adviser at the Andalusian Youth Institute. In 2007, he was elected as an alcalde, a type of magistrate of Valdelamusa and a lieutenant mayor of Cortegana. He was a former representative councilman of Mining Development, Youth, Voluntary work, Participation, Cooperation. In 2011, he was named Provincial Delegate of Culture of the Regional Government of Andalusia to Huelva. In 2014 he moved to Seville to work at the Office of the Chair of the Regional Government of Andalusia.

== Policy ==
He is currently the Secretary of Social Networks for PSOE of Huelva and General Secretary for Valdelamusa's PSOE. He is also a member of the Director's Committee of PSOE of Andalusia. He has been a Secretary of Student Politics of Socialist Youth of Huelva (1997–2000), Secretary of Organization (2004–2008) and a General Secretary (2008–2011). In addition, he has been the President of the Committee of the Socialist Youth of Andalusia (2010–2012) and member of the Federal Committee of the Socialist Youth of Spain.

== Other roles ==
He has been a president of juvenile and cultural associations. He was the president of the Sports Club Valdelamusa of football (2006–2011), on three occasions. In addition, he was also the representative of the student body in the constituent Cloister of the University of Huelva, a columnist of the diaries ODIEL and El Periódico de Huelva and at present, of Sólo Huelva Radio. He was a collaborator of the Huelva Informacion and of Cadena 100 Huelva. He was the winner of the first literary contest in SMS of the IAJ.

His first book, A Cielo Abierto, was published in 2014, with Ediciones Niebla.
