= Ángel Menchaca =

Paraguayan–Argentine music theorist

Ángel Menchaca (March 1, 1855 – May 8, 1924) was an Argentine music theorist of Paraguayan birth.

Born in Asunción, Menchaca was of Basque extraction. Trained for a career in the law, he taught history and literature in Buenos Aires. In 1914 he published Nuevo sistema teórico-gráfico de la música, which suggested a new system of musical notation based on a 12-note alphabet instead of traditionally-used notes and staffs. The system was the subject of a lecture tour which he gave throughout Europe; he also invented a special keyboard which was meant to use it. A composer as well, he wrote songs and choral music for use in schools, among other works. He died in Buenos Aires.
