= Ángel Romero (music journalist) =

Spanish world music journalist

- Occupations: music journalist and record producer
- Years active: 1990s-present
- Known for: Websites World Music Central and Transglobal World Music Chart
- Website: worldmusiccentral.org/author/aromero/

Ángel Romero y Ruiz is a Spanish music journalist and record producer based in the U.S. He is known as the founder and main contributor of the websites World Music Central and Transglobal World Music Chart. Writing about a wide spectrum of non-Western contemporary and traditional music, Romero has contributed numerous articles and album reviews for different genres and expressions of world music.

== Life and career ==
According to their website, the nonprofit online portal World Music Central "feature[s] the latest international news, CD and concert reviews, articles, and many resources (in the form of a wiki) for music fans, industry professionals and researchers. Our definition of World Music includes traditional and contemporary folk and roots music from the entire globe, as well as cross-cultural fusions and hybrids. Apart from being World Music Central's senior editor since 2002, Romero is one of the founders and administrators of the Transglobal World Music Chart, a group of world music DJs and writers. He also works as director and editor-in-chief for the Spanish-language portal Músicas del Mundo. Further, he has founded and written for the online portal Progressive Rock Central and is a panelist member of the Iberian Roots Music Charts Limur.

Romero has produced albums for his company Alula Records with artists including Grammy Award winner Tim O'Brien, Spanish Flamenco guitarist Gerardo Núñez, American composer Jamshied Sharifi and Malian kora player Mamadou Diabate. In 1998, Alula Records was a candidate for Crossroads Magazine’s “World Label of the Year” award. For the defunct label Ellipsis arts, Romero was producer for albums including Duende - From Traditional Masters To Gypsy Rock, Best of Ellipsis Arts and The Best of Ellipsis Arts: Big Bang.

As music journalist, Romero has written numerous reviews for world music albums, book reviews and articles including the history of the West African djembe goblet drum, the Cuban-born dance style Chachachá and the use of frame drums in different cultures.

== Personal life ==
Born in Spain, Romero lives and works in Durham, North Carolina.

== Reception ==
Romero's work for World Music Central and as music producer has repeatedly been acknowledged in Billboard magazine. On July 10, 1999, Billboard magazine published an article quoting Romero as CEO of Alula Records. In 2014, Real World Records included a story by Romero for their Real World Tales on the occasion of the label's 25th anniversary 3 CD box. Reviews of albums written by Romero have also been published by the world music platform WOMEX.

In her 2015 review of Romero's work for earlier versions of World Music Central, Deborah Justice from Syracuse University remarked the portal's "great potential" as "an important connection to hard-to-find artists and music." Further, she credited the website's "good service by promoting artists and genres outside of the usual airwaves."

== See also ==
- Music criticism
- Folk music
