= Ángel Cancel =

Puerto Rican basketball player

Ángel Cancel Acevedo (born 2 August 1940) in Río Piedras, Puerto Rico is a Puerto Rican former basketball player who competed in the 1960 Summer Olympics, in the 1964 Summer Olympics, and in the 1968 Summer Olympics.
