= Ángel Gómez (footballer, born 2001) =

Argentine professional footballer

Personal information
- Full name: Ángel Nahuel Gómez
- Date of birth: 24 August 2001 (age 25)
- Place of birth: San Francisco Solano, Argentina
- Height: 1.71 m (5 ft 7 in)
- Position: Midfielder

Team information
- Current team: Círculo Deportivo

Youth career
- 2007–2020: Racing Club

Senior career*
Years	Team	Apps	(Gls)
2020–	Racing Club	5	(0)
2022–2023	→ Tallerese RE (loan)	13	(0)
2024–	→ Círculo Deportivo (loan)	14	(1)
- * Club domestic league appearances and goals as of 1 September 2024

Ángel Nahuel Gómez (born 24 August 2001) is an Argentine professional footballer who plays as a midfielder for Torneo Federal A club Círculo Deportivo on loan from Racing Club.

== Career ==
Gómez is a product of the Racing Club youth system, having joined them at the age of six. He was moved into the first-team in late-2020 under manager Sebastián Beccacece, who subsequently selected him to make his senior debut off the bench against Atlético Tucumán on 19 November; playing the final moments of a 2–0 loss in the Copa de la Liga Profesional.

== Career statistics ==
As of 20 November 2020.

Appearances and goals by club, season and competition
Club	Season	League			Cup		League Cup		Continental		Other		Total	
Club	Season	Division	Apps	Goals	Apps	Goals	Apps	Goals	Apps	Goals	Apps	Goals	Apps	Goals
Racing Club	2020–21 (Note: Soccerway counts Copa de la Liga Profesional appearances as league appearances.)	Primera División	1	0	0	0	0	0	0	0	0	0	1	0
Career total			1	0	0	0	0	0	0	0	0	0	1	0
