= Angel Dones =

Puerto Rican judoka (born 1990)

Angel Luis Dones Silva (born 1 December 1990 in Puerto Rico) is a judoka. He won a silver medal at the Pan American Judo Championships 2009 at El Salvador. He won a bronze medal in judo team competition at the 2014 Central American and Caribbean Games in Veracruz.
