= Angel Robinson =

Angel Robinson may refer to:

- Angel Robinson (basketball, born 1989), basketball player for Marquette University
- Angel Robinson (basketball, born 1987), basketball player for the Phoenix Mercury
- Angel Robinson Garcia (1937–2000), Cuban boxer

== See also ==
- Angela Robinson (disambiguation)
