= Ángel Parra =

Ángel Parra may refer to:

- Ángel Parra (singer-songwriter), or Luis Ángel Cereceda Parra (1943–2017), Chilean singer-songwriter
- Ángel Parra Jr., or Ángel Cereceda Orrego (born 1966), Chilean guitarist, former member of the band Los Tres, son of the singer-songwriter
- Ángel Parra Trío, Chilean jazz band led by Ángel Parra Jr.
- Ángel Parra (judoka) (born 1983), Spanish judoka
