= Ángel Alfaro =

Spanish footballer

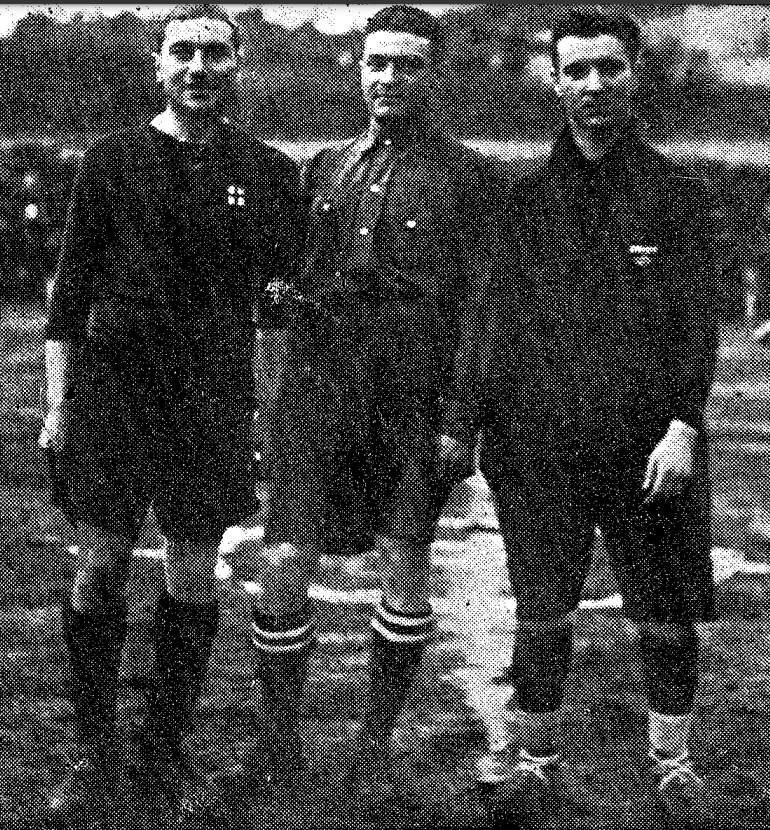
- Alfaro (right) in 1922

Personal information
- Full name: Ángel Alfaro Garión
- Date of birth: 7 March 1899
- Place of birth: Barcelona, Catalonia, Spain
- Position: Forward

Senior career*
Years	Team	Apps	(Gls)
1915–1916	Barcelona		
1917–1920	Espanyol		
1920–1921	CP La Felguera		
1921–1923	FC Espanya		
1922–1923	→ UD Girona (on loan)		
1923–1925	Martinenc		
1925–1927	Gimnástico FC		
1927–1928	Zaragoza CD		
1928–1929	Cartagena		
1929–1930	Elche		
- * Club domestic league appearances and goals

Ángel Alfaro Garión (7 March 1899 – unknown) was a Spanish footballer who played as a forward for FC Barcelona and RCD Espanyol.

== Playing career ==
Born on 7 March 1899 in Barcelona, Alfaro began playing football in his hometown club FC Barcelona in 1915, but he only played 3 friendly matches. He then played three seasons at RCD Espanyol, where he played 22 official matches. In the 1920–21 season he went to Asturias, where he was a player and promoter of the club CP La Felguera.

Alfaro played for FC Espanya between 1921 and 1923, a club that later became FC Gràcia. In June 1922, he was the captain of UD Girona in the inaugural match of the Camp de Vista Alegre, scoring a consolation goal in a 2–5 loss to Barça. He then played at FC Martinenc between 1923 and 1925.

The following years he played at Gimnástico FC (1925–27), Zaragoza CD (1927–28), Cartagena (1928–29), and Elche (1929–30).

The date of his death is unknown.
