= Angel Rodrigues =

American soccer player

Angel Rodrigues was an American soccer player who earned two caps with the U.S. national team in 1937. Both of his caps came in losses to Mexico in September 1937. The first was a 7–3 loss on September 19 and the second a 5–1 loss six days later.
