= Angel Rusev =

Angel Rusev may refer to:

- Angel Rusev (footballer)
- Angel Rusev (weightlifter)
