= Ángel Peña =

Angel Peña may refer to:

- Ángel Peña (baseball) (born 1975), Dominican baseball player
- Ángel Peña (musician) (born 1948), Puerto Rican musician and composer
- Angel Peña Ramírez (born 1978), Puerto Rican politician
