= Ángel Iturriaga Barco =

Spanish writer and historian

Ángel Iturriaga
- Born: 1974 (age 51–52); Logroño
- Occupations: Historian and writer
- Writing career
- Language: Spanish
- Notable works: The Dictionary Of FC Barcelona Players (2010), The Dictionary of Coaches & Directors of FC Barcelona (2011), and The Dictionary of the Spanish National Team Players (2013)
- Website: grup14.com/member/angel-iturriaga

Ángel Iturriaga Barco (Logroño, 1974) is a Spanish writer and historian, professor in Universidad Internacional de La Rioja (UNIR). He is a doctor in contemporary history with a thesis named "El poder político y social en la historia del FC Barcelona". He is the author of several football history books. Among them are the Diccionario de jugadores del FC Barcelona (2010), the Diccionario de técnicos y directivos del FC Barcelona (2011) and the Diccionario de jugadores de la selección española de fútbol (2013).

In October 2013 he published biographical novel Paulino (Edicions Saldonar) with David Valero. The two authors bring up the figure of Paulino Alcántara, known for his 369 goals in 257 games. "It was necessary to make a biography of a great sports star like Paulino because it is one of the first superstars of the sport and the best Asian footballer of all time", stated the two authors.

He now writes for Grup 14, an organisation dedicated to the improvement of Futbol Club Barcelona with the collaboration of all its supporters throughout the world.

== Published work ==
- Diccionario de jugadores del FC Barcelona, 2010, Base, ISBN 978-84-92437-74-0
- Diccionario de técnicos y directivos del FC Barcelona, 2011, Base, ISBN 978-84-939161-2-1
- Paulino: el primer crac de la història del Barça (with David Valero), 2013, Saldonar, ISBN 978-84-941164-5-2
- Diccionario de jugadores de la selección española de fútbol, 2013, T&B, ISBN 978-84-15405-64-1
- El Barça, rey de Europa, Al Poste, 2015, ISBN 9788415726470
- Diccionario de jugadores del Atlético de Madrid, 2016, Siníndice, ISBN 9788415924166
