= Ángel Castro =

Ángel Castro may refer to:

- Ángel Castro y Argiz (1875–1956), father of Cuban leaders Raúl and Fidel Castro
- Ángel Castro (first baseman) (1917–1983), Mexican baseball player
- Ángel Castro (pitcher) (born 1982), Dominican baseball player

== See also ==
- Ángela Castro (born 1993), Bolivian race walker
- Angelo Castro Jr. (1945–2012), Filipino broadcast journalist and actor
- Castro (surname)
