= Ángel González (Spanish footballer) =

Spanish association football player

Personal information
- Full name: Ángel González Castaños
- Date of birth: 3 December 1958 (age 67)
- Place of birth: Ciudad Rodrigo, Spain
- Height: 1.69 m (5 ft 7 in)
- Position: Winger

Youth career
- Viviendas del Congreso
- 1972–1977: Español

Senior career*
Years	Team	Apps	(Gls)
1977–1981	Español	24	(0)
1978–1979	→ Sabadell (loan)	35	(17)
1981–1982	Sabadell	23	(8)
1982–1985	Salamanca	93	(11)
1985–1989	Logroñés	131	(8)
1989–1991	Palamós	66	(10)
1991–1993	Figueres	46	(4)
Total		418	(58)

International career
1976–1977	Spain U18	7	(1)
1977	Spain U20	1	(0)
1978–1979	Spain U21	3	(1)
1980	Spain Olympic	3	(0)
- * Club domestic league appearances and goals

Ángel González Castaños (born 3 December 1958) is a Spanish former footballer who played as a left winger.

== Club career ==
Born in Ciudad Rodrigo, Province of Salamanca, González started out at RCD Español, making his La Liga debut on 5 April 1978 in a 1–3 home loss against Atlético Madrid where he came on as a 64th-minute substitute; it was one of only three appearances during the season. The following campaign, he was loaned to neighbouring club CE Sabadell FC in the Segunda División, being conscripted to military service in the city.

In the top flight, González also represented UD Salamanca and CD Logroñés, for a total of 151 games and ten goals over seven seasons. He added 267 matches and 48 goals in the second tier, retiring in 1993 at the age of 34 after two years apiece with Palamós CF and UE Figueres, also in the Catalonia region.

== International career ==
González represented Spain at the 1980 Summer Olympics, where they competed under the Olympic flag due to the boycott. In his hometown, plaques commemorated any Olympian born in the city, but he appeared to have been forgotten as his name was not listed.
