= Ángel Montoro =

Ángel Montoro may refer to:

- Ángel Montoro (footballer) (born 1988), Spanish footballer
- Ángel Montoro (handballer) (born 1989), Spanish handballer

== See also ==
- Montoro, Municipality in Andalusia, Spain
