= Ángel Maria Herrera =

Panamanian educator (1859–1948)

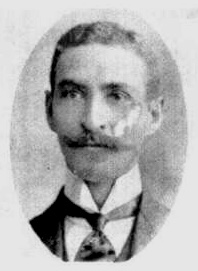
- Born: Ángel María Herrera; December 3, 1859
- Died: May 2, 1948 (aged 88); Panama
- Occupation: Teacher

Ángel Maria Herrera (December 3, 1859, Penonomé District, Coclé Province, Granadine Confederation - May 2, 1948 Panama), was a Panamanian educator.

Received her teaching degree in 1884 at the Ecole Normale de Institutores and that same year was appointed Académicode the Boys' School of Saints, and a year later was reappointed Chief Academic School for Boys of St. Anne in Panama. He was the son of Don Braulio Herrera and Doña Luisa Tuñón. Herrera was named Preceptor in Penonome. A year later it was 1897 he was Director of the School of the College of the Isthmus. For several years he was inspector of public instruction in the province of Colon and Cocle province. In the District of Penonomé school there with your name. A few years ago the school suffered a serious fire in which spent $40,000 in losses.

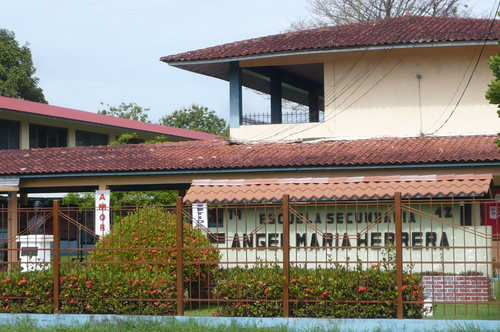
School Angel Maria Herrera ", located in the District of Penonomé, Cocle province

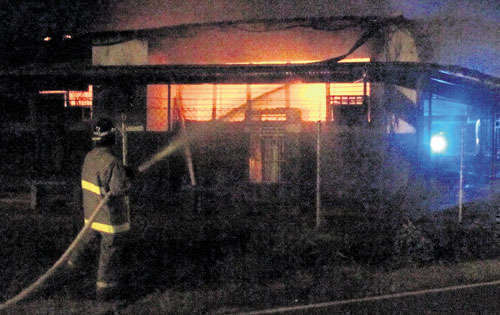
Fire at School "Angel Maria Herrera."
