= Angel Ramos =

Angel Ramos may refer to:

- Ángel Ramos (industrialist) (1902–1960), Puerto Rican businessman
- Ángel Ramos (educator) (born 1950), Puerto Rican superintendent of the Idaho School for the Deaf and the Blind
