= Ángel Rojas =

Ángel Rojas may refer to:

- Ángel Dolores Rojas (1851-1918), Argentine lawyer and politician
- Ángel Felicísimo Rojas (1909-2003), Ecuadorian writer
- Ángel Clemente Rojas (born 1944), Argentine football striker
- Ángel Rojas (footballer, born 1985), Chilean football midfielder
- Ángel Rojas (footballer, born 1997), Chilean football defender
- Angel Rojas (The Batman), fictional character in animated TV series The Batman

== See also ==
- Miguel Ángel Rojas (born 1946), Colombian conceptual artist
