= Angel Hsu =

American environmental scientist

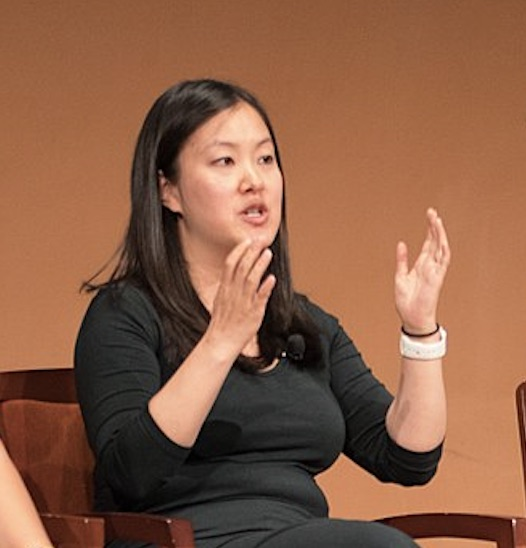
- Born: February 23, 1983
- Education: Wake Forest University, University of Cambridge, Yale University
- Spouse: Carlin Rosengarten
- Scientific career
- Fields: Environmental science
- Workplaces: University of North Carolina at Chapel Hill

External videos
- "Cities are driving climate change. Here's how they can fix it", TED 2020
- "How China is (and isn't) fighting pollution and climate change", TED 2018

Angel Hsu (born 23 February 1983) is an American climatologist and environmental scientist. She is the founder and head of the Data-Driven EnviroLab at the University of North Carolina at Chapel Hill.

== Education ==
Hsu's parents immigrated to South Carolina from Taiwan. Hsu holds bachelor's degrees in biology and political science from Wake Forest University, a master's degree in environmental policy from the University of Cambridge, and a doctorate degree in forestry and environmental studies from Yale University. Her interest shifted from biology to public policy after researching insect-plant interactions in the Costa Rican rain forest.

Hsu has been married to Carlin Rosengarten since 29 May 2016.

== Career ==
Hsu has worked with the World Resources Institute in Washington, D.C. Hsu also worked at Yale-NUS College before becoming an assistant professor of Public Policy and the Environment, Ecology and Energy Program (E3P) at the University of North Carolina at Chapel Hill.

Hsu is the founder and principal investigator of the Data-Driven EnviroLab (Data-Driven Lab), an interdisciplinary and international group of researchers working to strengthen environmental policy, founded in 2015.

== Research ==
Hsu's research deals with environmental decision-making. and she uses quantitative methods to study the impact of policy, transparency and accountability and the actions of individuals, companies, cities and countries.

Hsu develops metrics and programs that aggregate "third wave data" and uses it to measure and monitor progress towards reducing carbon emissions. For example, the Urban Environment and Social Inclusion Index (UESI) can be used to track progress on both environmental conditions and social equity in cities. Her goals include identifying and filling gaps in information, and improving communication between scientists and policy-makers.

Hsu was the lead author of a 2020 study which investigated racial disparities in urban heat island exposure, which were exacerbated by redlining and other unfairness in urban planning that led to the hottest neighborhoods housing predominantly poor people of color. Hsu was also a lead author of the fifth chapter on the role of non-state and sub-national actors in the Intergovernmental Panel on Climate Change Emissions Gap Report of 2018.

In 2021, Hsu testified before the U.S. Senate Committee on Energy and Natural Resources on “Examining Global Climate Trends and Progress in addressing Climate Change”. In 2022, she said the geopolitical rivalry between the U.S. and China made cooperation between the two countries on global issues like climate change all the more important.

== Awards ==
- 2016, Inaugural Grist 50 Leader, Grist magazine
- 2022, Bloomberg New Economy Catalyst.

== Selected publications ==
- Hsu, Angel; Moffat, Andrew S.; Weinfurter, Amy J.; Schwartz, Jason D. (June 2015). "Towards a new climate diplomacy". Nature Climate Change. 5 (6): 501–503. Bibcode:2015NatCC...5..501H. doi:10.1038/nclimate2594.
- Hsu, Angel; Cheng, Yaping; Weinfurter, Amy; Xu, Kaiyang; Yick, Cameron (April 2016). "Track climate pledges of cities and companies". Nature. 532 (7599): 303–306. Bibcode:2016Natur.532..303H. doi:10.1038/532303a. PMID 27111615. S2CID 4459656.
- Hsu, Angel; Weinfurter, Amy J.; Xu, Kaiyang (June 2017). "Aligning subnational climate actions for the new post-Paris climate regime". Climatic Change. 142 (3–4): 419–432. Bibcode:2017ClCh..142..419H. doi:10.1007/s10584-017-1957-5. S2CID 157378414.
- Hsu, Angel; Widerberg, Oscar; Bakhtiari, Fatemeh; Chan, Sander; Lütkehermöller, Katharina; Roelfsema, Mark; Weinfurter, Amy (2018). "Chapter 5. Bridging the gap: The role of non-state and subnational actors". The emissions gap report 2018 (PDF). Nairobi, Kenya: United Nations Environment Programme. ISBN 978-92-807-3726-4.
- Hsu, Angel; Chakraborty, T. C.; Sheriff, Glenn; Manya, Diego (10 December 2020). "Urban Heat Island Inequalities by Sociodemographic Characteristics in Major U.S. cities". American Geophysical Union, Fall Meeting. 2020. AGU. Bibcode:2020AGUFMGC0540008H.
- Seto, Karen C.; Churkina, Galina; Hsu, Angel; Keller, Meredith; Newman, Peter W.G.; Qin, Bo; Ramaswami, Anu (18 October 2021). "From Low- to Net-Zero Carbon Cities: The Next Global Agenda". Annual Review of Environment and Resources. 46 (1): 377–415. doi:10.1146/annurev-environ-050120-113117. ISSN 1543-5938. S2CID 238677484.
