= Ángel Santamarina =

Argentine fencer

Personal information
- Born: 28 January 1894 Buenos Aires

Sport
- Sport: Fencing

Ángel Santamarina (born 28 January 1894, date of death unknown) was an Argentine fencer. He competed in the team foil competition at the 1924 Summer Olympics.
