= Angel Chan (disambiguation) =

Angel Chan or Angel-chan may refer to:

== People ==
- Angel Chan, Malaysian actress nominated at the 2018 Malaysia International Film Festival
- Angel Chan, U.S. basketball player, a notable player for the 2008–09 Mid-American Conference women's basketball season
- Chan Hao-ching (born 1993; English name: Angel Chan), Taiwanese tennis player
- Shirley Angel Chan, Hongkonger ice skater, 2010 gold medalist at the Hong Kong Figure Skating Championships
- Angel Chan, a founder of the soccer team Kabuscorp De Laguna F.C., Laguna, Philippines
- Miguel Ángel Chan, Guatemalan runner, a gold medalist in 3000m steeplechase for athletics at the 2013 Central American Games

== Characters ==
=== Female ===
- Angel Chan, a fictional character from the Hong Kong film City Under Siege (2010 film)
- Angel-chan, a fictional character from Hamtaro; see List of Hamtaro characters
- Angel-chan, a fictional character from High School DXD; see List of High School DxD characters

== See also ==
- Angela Chan (born 1967), U.S. fashion designer
- Angela Chang (born 1982), Taiwanese singer
- Angelin Chang, U.S. pianist
- Angeline Chang, Singaporean pageant princess at the Miss Chinese International Pageant 2003
- Angel Chiang (born 1989), Hongkonger actress
- Angel (disambiguation)
- Chan (disambiguation)
