= Ángel Hermida =

Spanish handball player (born 1967)

Angel Hermida
Personal information
- Nationality: Spanish
- Born: 25 February 1967 (age 58) Madrid, Spain

Sport
- Sport: Handball

Ángel Hermida (born 25 February 1967) is a Spanish handball player. He competed in the men's tournament at the 1992 Summer Olympics.
