= Ángel Jiménez =

Ángel Jiménez may refer to:

- Ángel Jiménez (sailor) (born 1961), Cuban Olympic sailor
- Ángel Jiménez (footballer) (born 2002), Spanish footballer
- Ángel Jiménez (long jumper), Cuban paralympic athlete

== See also ==
- Ángela Jiménez (1886-1990), Mexican soldier during the Mexican revolution
- Ángel Giménez (born 1955), Spanish tennis player
