= Angel Beltrán =

Cuban volleyball player

Ángel Beltrán

Personal information
- Full name: Ángel Beltrán Mariño
- Born: 26 April 1973 (age 53); Santiago de Cuba, Cuba
- Height: 2.03 m (6 ft 8 in)

Volleyball information
- Position: Middle blocker
- Number: 15

National team
| 1989–1998 | Cuba |
Honours
Men's volleyball
Representing Cuba
FIVB World Cup
| Gold medal – first place | 1989 Japan |
| Silver medal – second place | 1991 Japan |
World Grand Champions Cup
| Bronze medal – third place | 1997 Japan |
FIVB World League
| Gold medal – first place | 1998 Italy |
| Silver medal – second place | 1997 Russia |
Central American and Caribbean Games
| Gold medal – first place | 1993 Ponce | Team |

Ángel Beltrán (born 26 April 1973) is a retired Cuban volleyball player. He competed in the men's tournament at the 1996 Summer Olympics in Atlanta. He won a gold medal with the Cuban team at the 1993 Central American and Caribbean Games in Ponce.
