= Ángel Cabrera (disambiguation) =

Ángel Cabrera (born 1969) is an Argentine golfer.

Ángel Cabrera may also refer to:

- Ángel Cabrera (naturalist) (1879–1960), Spanish zoologist
- Ángel Lulio Cabrera (1908–1999), Spanish-Argentine botanist
- Ángel Cabrera (footballer) (1939–2010), Uruguayan football forward
- Ángel Cabrera (academic) (born 1967), President of Georgia Tech

== See also ==
- Ángel Cabrera Classic, a golf tournament on the TPG Tour, the official professional golf tour in Argentina
- Geles Cabrera (Ángeles Cabrera, 1926–2026), Mexican sculptor
- Cabrera (disambiguation)
