= Angel Savov =

Bulgarian stage and film actor

- Born: 18 February 1925, Aytos, Bulgaria
- Died: 5 June 1990, Sliven, Bulgaria
- Occupation: Actor
- Years active: 1951-1989
- Spouse: Elena Savova
- Children: Snezhina Chirpanlieva, Avgustina Savova

Angel Sotirov Savov (Bulgarian: Ангел Сотиров Савов; 18 February 1925 – 5 June 1990) was a Bulgarian stage and film actor.

Savov was born on 18 February 1925 in Aytos, Bulgaria in the family of the architect and building entrepreneur Sotir Savov. He inherited his talent for painting and drawing from his mother Aspasia Savova and started as a portrait painter before becoming an actor in 1947.

Savov was a leading actor at the Steven Kirov National Drama Theater in Sliven with more than 100 roles. He made his stage debut in 1951 and appeared in many of the Bulgarian theatre classics such as Nemili Nedragi (Bulgarian: "Немили недраги"), Sluzhbogontsi (Bulgarian: "Службогонци"), Ivan Shishman (Bulgarian: "Иван Шишман"). He has directed several stage performances as well. In 1974 he played in the movie Dnevna Svetlina (Bulgarian: "Дневна Светлина").

Among his most memorable roles are Goriot ("Le Père Goriot" by Honoré de Balzac), Ivan Pavlovich ("Marriage" by Nikolai Gogol) and Schweik ("The Good Soldier Svejk" by Jaroslav Hašek). Angel Savov was a guest actor in theatre plays staged in Germany, Russia and the Czech Republic. He is awarded with the title of Honorary Citizen of Sliven.

Savov married Elena Savova in 1954; they had two daughters: Snezhina and Avgustina. Snezhina Chirpanlieva is also an actress.
