= Angel Metodiev =

Bulgarian painter (1921–1984)

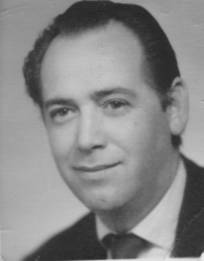
- Born: 16 March 1921; Veliki Preslav, Bulgaria
- Died: 29 April 1984 (aged 63); Sofia, Bulgaria
- Known for: Painter

Angel Metodiev (Angel Metodiev Angelov, Bulgarian: Ангел Методиев Ангелов) (16 March 1921 – 29 April 1984) was a Bulgarian fine art painter (Classical Realism) and teacher. He was particularly famous for his portraits, nudes and landscapes.

== Biography ==
Angel Metodiev was born in Kirkovo, now a part of Veliki Preslav (near Varna), the oldest capital of Bulgaria, and started his career at the National Academy of Art in Sofia where he studied with Professor Boris Mitov and graduated summa cum laude (with the highest honors).

He was invited and became assistant professor of Professor Panaiot Panaiotov. Later he worked with Professor Nenko Balkansky and Professor Ilya Petrov. The professional career at the National Academy of Art of Angel Metodiev lasted from 1951 until 1970 in Sofia, Bulgaria.

== Achievements ==
He received many art prizes during his career, e.g. the Sofia Prize (general prize from the city of Sofia) where he got the first prize and was awarded with the medal and special diploma. He organized a lot of exhibitions of his own works such as his favourite "Ancient and Contemporary Greece". Angel Metodiev participated in almost all of the Bulgarian National Exhibitions. He was the first one in Bulgaria to take the initiative to organize a "meeting of the three arts - fine art, poetry and music" at the opening of his exhibition in the city of Petrich.

During his last 10 years, Angel Metodiev worked enthusiastically on wood carvings, of many of them remained unfinished due to his unexpected death.

Before he died in 1984 one of his dreams was to have a house - museum where his works could be exhibited all together. Because of that his second wife Helia Metodieva donated more than 70 of his paintings and wood-carvings to the foundation "13th century Bulgaria" which gave them to the city of Veliki Preslav to be exhibited there. For this gesture, Mrs. Metodieva was honored with the Order of Saints Cyril and Methodius - 1st Class.

Most of the paintings of Angel Metodiev are now in the art gallery of Veliki Preslav. They can be seen also at the national galleries in Varna, Blagoevgrad and Shumen, Bulgaria.
