= University of Huelva =

Spanish university

- Universidad de Huelva
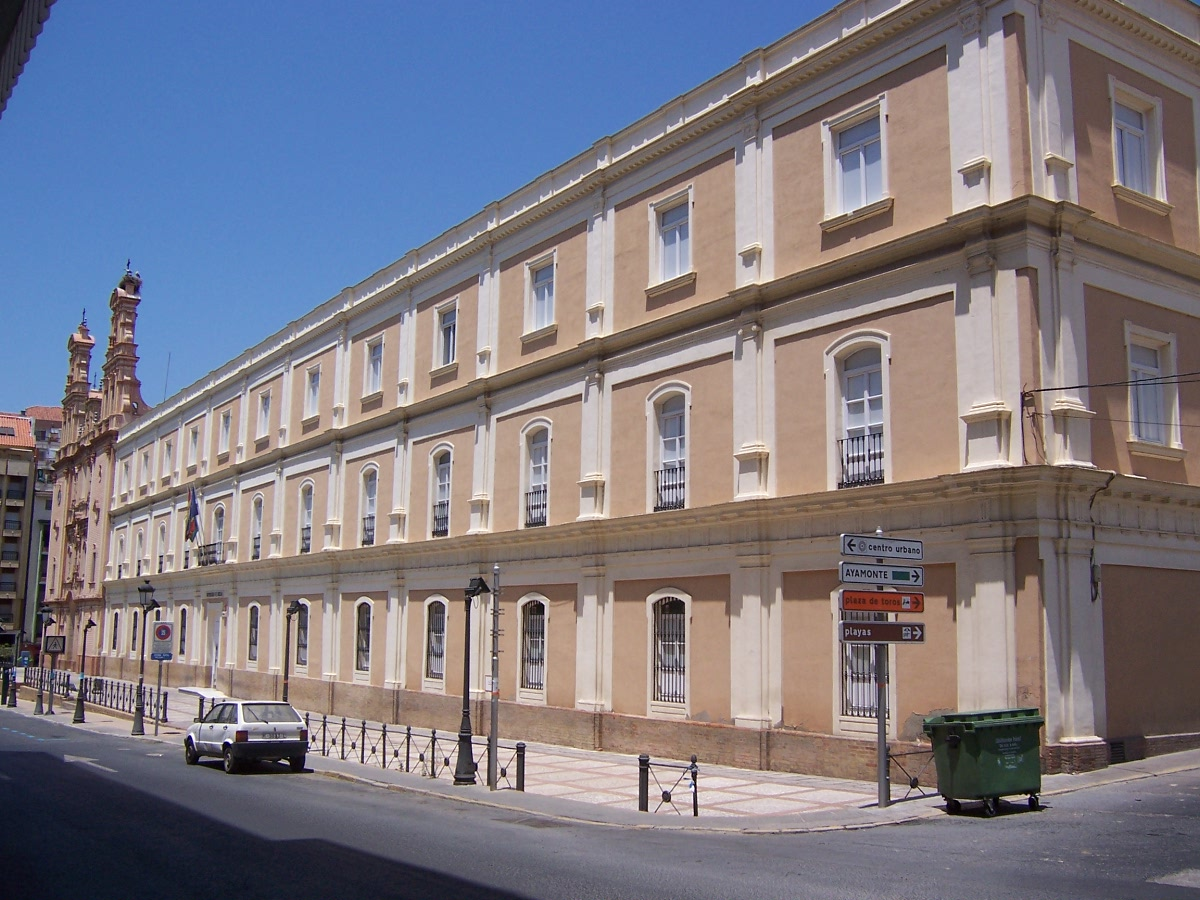
- Motto: Universitas Onubensis Sapere Aude
- Motto in English: Dare to Know
- Type: Public
- Established: 1993; 33 years ago
- Academic staff: 960
- Undergraduates: 11,358
- Location: Huelva, Huelva, Spain
- Website: www.uhu.es

The University of Huelva (UHU) is a public university in Huelva, Spain. It was founded in 1993. It is included in the campus of international excellence.

The university offers undergraduate degrees, postgraduate degrees, and doctoral programs across a wide range of fields, including arts and humanities, engineering and technology, health sciences, natural sciences, and social sciences.

== History ==
Depending on the University of Seville, provincial entities had been calling for segregation for years. In 1987, the La Rábida School Center Board had already called for the creation of independent faculties for the city. But it was in 1988 when a powerful local movement was developed that called for the creation of its own entity in Huelva. These movements had their climax on 3 March, with a general strike in the capital widely followed and a final rally in the Plaza de las Monjas (Huelva). In July they managed to use the old Hospital of La Merced, annexed to the Cathedral as a space for the future university and the agreement for the creation of the first two faculties was signed, not until two years later when the third was signed. That same year, the University Board of Trustees (Patronato Universitario) was established with the approval of the institutions and both the Provincial Council of Huelva (Diputación Provincial de Huelva) and the City Council of Huelva (Ayuntamiento de Huelva) agree in their plenary sessions to apply for a university. On 12 December, the Parliament of Andalusia approved this request, recognizing already in May its future creation for 1992.

Finally, one year behind the initial plans, it was segregated from Seville on 1 July 1993. The first President of the Management Commission was Francisco Ruiz Berraquero. His first elected rector was Ramírez de Verger, the current rector being María Antonia Peña Guerrero. With 11,251 students in the 2017/2018 academic year, 816 teachers, 37 degrees and 23 doctoral programs in recent years, the number of ERASMUS and non-ERASMUS students from the province has increased substantially.

== Campus ==
The University of Huelva is subdivided into different zones or university campuses:

La Merced. Former 15th century Mercedarian convent and more recently hospital, adjacent to the cathedral. It is the faculty at the city center.

Cantero Cuadrado. Old School of Teaching since the 60s, which was the germ of the university when it was dependent on the University of Seville. It currently functions as an administrative headquarters.

Campus Universitario del Carmen. Located in the former infantry barracks, which was based on the recovery of the military barracks converted into educational facilities. Today, it is the most modern complex and unites most of the university's faculties. Its Rectorate is located in the building of the Campus of Cantero Cuadrado.

Former Escuela Técnica Superior de Ingeniería de la Rábida. Located just before La Rábida, it began its history with the Schools of Mines and Forestry, which were later joined by the Industrial, Agricultural and IT Engineer. The secondary school Prof. Vicente Rodríguez Casado is also located on the campus.

== Faculties ==
The faculties and schools are responsible for organizing the teaching of the various degrees issued by the University. The schools and faculties of the university are:

- Higher Technical School of Engineering
- Faculty of Social Work
- Faculty of Nursing
- Faculty of Education, Psychology and Sports Sciences
- Faculty of Labor Sciences
- Faculty of Business
- Faculty of Experimental Sciences
- Faculty of Law
- Faculty of Humanities
- Environmental biology and public health
- Agroforestry Science
- Public law
- Integrated Didactics
- Business Management and Marketing
- General economics and statistics
- Financial economics, accounting and operations management
- Pedagogy
- English philology
- Philology
- Physics Applied
- Geology
- Geodynamics and paleontology
- History, Geography and Anthropology
- Design and project engineering
- Electrical and thermal engineering
- Electronic, computer system and automatic engineering
- Chemical, chemical and physical engineering and organic chemistry
- Mining, mechanical and energy engineering
- Mathematics
- Psychology
- Chemistry and materials science
- Sociology and social work
- Information Technologies
