= Aniela =

Aniela is a Polish feminine given name, cognate with the Greek-derived name Angela. Anielka is a hypocorism of this name. The name Aniela became popular in the 18th century mainly due to the Ursulines.

People with these names include:

- Aniela Aszpergerowa (1815–1920), Polish stage actress
- Aniela Tułodziecka (1853–1932), Polish educational activist
- Aniela Pająkówna (1864–1912), Polish painter who worked in France
- Aniela Zagórska (1881–1943), Polish literary translator
- Aniela Steinsbergowa (1896–1988), Polish lawyer
- Aniela Cukier (1900–1944), Polish painter
- Anielka Elter (1901–1958), Czechoslovak film actress
- Aniela Pawlikowska (1901–1980), Polish painter who worked in England
- Aniela Chałubińska (1902–1998), Polish geographer and geologist
- Aniela Jaffé (1903–1991), Swiss psychoanalyst
- Aniela Kupiec (1920–2019), Polish poet
- Aniela Krzywoń (1925–1943), Polish People's Army soldier
- Aniela Nikiel (born 1965), Polish long-distance runner
- Aniela Rodríguez (born 1992), Mexican poet and writer
- Aniela Tolentino (born 1996), Filipino politician
- Miss Aniela (born 1986, as Natalie Dybisz), British photographer
