= Granta =

British literary magazine and publisher

- Granta 142
- Editor: Thomas Meaney
- Categories: Literary magazine
- Frequency: Quarterly
- Publisher: Sigrid Rausing
- Total circulation: 23,000 (2023)
- Founded: 1889; 137 years ago
- First issue: Relaunch: 1 September 1979
- Country: United Kingdom
- Based in: London
- Language: English
- Website: www.granta.com
- ISSN: 0017-3231

Granta is a literary magazine and publisher in the United Kingdom whose mission centres on its "belief in the power and urgency of the story, both in fiction and non-fiction, and the story's supreme ability to describe, illuminate and make real." In 2007, The Observer stated: "In its blend of memoirs and photojournalism, and in its championing of contemporary realist fiction, Granta has its face pressed firmly against the window, determined to witness the world."

Granta has published twenty-seven laureates of the Nobel Prize in Literature. Literature published by Granta has regularly won such prizes as the Forward Prize, T. S. Eliot Prize, Pushcart Prize and more.

== History ==
Granta was founded in 1889 by students at Cambridge University as The Granta, edited by R. C. Lehmann (who later became a major contributor to Punch). It was started as a periodical featuring student politics, badinage and literary efforts. The title was taken from the River Granta, the medieval name for the Cam, the river that runs through the city. An early editor of the magazine was R. P. Keigwin, the English cricketer and Danish scholar; in 1912–13, the editor was poet, writer and reviewer Edward Shanks.

In this form, the magazine had a long and distinguished history. The magazine published juvenilia of a number of writers who later became well known: Geoffrey Gorer, William Empson, Michael Frayn, Ted Hughes, A. A. Milne, Sylvia Plath, Bertram Fletcher Robinson, John Simpson, and Stevie Smith.

== Rebirth ==
During the 1970s, the publication faced financial difficulties and increasing levels of student apathy, and was rescued by a group of interested postgraduates, including writer and producer Jonathan Levi, journalist Bill Buford, and Peter de Bolla (now Professor of Cultural History and Aesthetics at Cambridge University). In 1979, it was successfully relaunched as a magazine of "new writing", with both writers and audience drawn from the world beyond Cambridge. The magazine's first issue as a national publication was entitled "New American Writing". Bill Buford (who wrote Among the Thugs originally as a project for the journal) was the editor for its first 16 years in the new incarnation. During this time, the staff included Richard Rayner and the novelist Carole Morin. Ian Jack succeeded Buford, editing Granta from 1995 until 2007.

Since 2003, Granta has been published in Spain in Spanish. In April 2007, it was announced that Jason Cowley, editor of the Observer Sport Monthly, would succeed Jack as editor in September 2007. Cowley redesigned and relaunched the magazine; he also launched a new website. In September 2008, he left after having been selected as editor of the New Statesman.

Alex Clark, a former deputy literary editor of The Observer, succeeded him as the first female editor of Granta. In late May 2009, Clark left the publication and John Freeman, the American editor, took over the magazine.

As of 2023, Granta's circulation is 23,000. In the 164th issue Sigrid Rausing, who had served as editor since 2013, announced she would turn over editorship to Thomas Meaney with the Autumn issue of 2023.

== Ownership ==
In 1994, Rea Hederman, owner of The New York Review of Books, took a controlling stake in the magazine. In October 2005, control of the magazine was bought by Sigrid Rausing. Rausing established the Granta Trust in 2019 as the owner of the magazine.

== Granta Books ==
In 1989, then-editor Buford founded Granta Books. Granta's stated aim for its book publishing imprint is to publish work that "stimulates, inspires, addresses difficult questions, and examines intriguing periods of history." Owner Sigrid Rausing has been vocal about her goal to maintain these standards for both the magazine and the book imprint, telling the Financial Times, "[Granta] will not publish any books that could not potentially be extracted in the magazine. We use the magazine as a yardstick for our books.... We are no longer going to look at what sells as a sort of argument, because it seemed to me that we were in danger of losing our inventiveness about what we wanted to do." Authors recently published by Granta Books include Michael Collins, Simon Gray, Anna Funder, Tim Guest, Caspar Henderson, Louise Stern and Olga Tokarczuk.

When Rausing purchased Granta, she brought with her the publishing imprint Portobello Books, founded in 2005; as of January 2019 the Portobello Books imprint was closed, with all its contracted authors thereafter published under the Granta Books imprint. Granta Books are distributed by The Book Service in the UK. Granta Books are distributed by Ingram Publisher Services in the US.

== Granta Best of Young British Novelists ==
In 1983, Granta (issue #7) published a list of 20 young British novelists as names to watch out for in the future. Since then, the magazine has repeated its recognition of emerging writers in 1993 (issue #43), 2003 (issue #81) and 2013 (issue #123). In 1996 (issue #54), Granta published a similar list of promising young American novelists, which was repeated during 2007 (issue #97). In 2010 Granta issue #113 was devoted to the best young Spanish-language novelists. Many of the selections have been prescient. Almost all of those identified have subsequently either won or been short-listed for major literary awards, including seven for the Booker Prize.

The recognition of Adam Thirlwell and Monica Ali on the 2003 list was controversial, as neither had yet published a novel. Thirlwell's debut novel, Politics, later met with mixed reviews. Ali's Brick Lane was widely praised. Those controversially excluded in 2003 included Giles Foden, Alex Garland, Niall Griffiths, Zoë Heller, Tobias Hill, Jon McGregor (who won the International Dublin Literary Award less than ten years later), Patrick Neate, Maggie O'Farrell and Rebecca Smith.

Dan Rhodes contacted others on the 2003 list to try to persuade them to make a joint statement in protest against the Iraq War, which was gaining momentum at the time. Not all the writers responded. Rhodes was so disappointed he considered stopping writing, but has continued.

In 2023, the list for the first time included international writers who view the UK as their home.

=== Ageism controversy ===
As with other bodies giving awards to younger writers, Granta has been accused of contributing to ageism in the publishing industry by promoting an age-restricted list. Writing in The Times, Erica Wagner complained about the ageism of the Granta list, as well as its predictability. Writing in The Guardian, Joanna Walsh argues that age-restricted awards also unfairly discriminate against women, people of colour, LGBTQ people, and other groups that might come late to writing. Writing in the Irish Examiner, she queried the arbritrariness of the age limits, noting that Granta's sister publication in the Spanish-speaking world sets an age limit of 35 for the same award. She also noted that age restriction of this sort is legislated against in employment. David Cutler of the Baring Foundation is among those who pointed out that the Turner Prize abolished its age limit in 2017, six years before the latest Granta list. Writers selected for the list have also complained about its discrimination. Yara Rodrigues Fowler tweeted that “Age cut offs are discriminatory to women, carers, disabled + working class ppl” and make for "a more boring and homogenous literature". Philip Hensher has said that he "regards such age-related line-ups as artificial and particularly unfair to women".

=== 1983 ===
- Martin Amis
- Pat Barker
- Julian Barnes
- Ursula Bentley
- William Boyd
- Buchi Emecheta
- Maggie Gee
- Kazuo Ishiguro
- Alan Judd
- Adam Mars-Jones
- Ian McEwan
- Shiva Naipaul
- Philip Norman
- Christopher Priest
- Salman Rushdie
- Clive Sinclair
- Graham Swift
- Rose Tremain
- Lisa St Aubin de Terán
- A. N. Wilson

=== 1993 ===
- Iain Banks
- Anne Billson
- Louis de Bernières
- Tibor Fischer
- Esther Freud
- Alan Hollinghurst
- Kazuo Ishiguro
- A. L. Kennedy
- Philip Kerr
- Hanif Kureishi
- Adam Lively
- Adam Mars-Jones
- Candia McWilliam
- Lawrence Norfolk
- Ben Okri
- Caryl Phillips
- Will Self
- Nicholas Shakespeare
- Helen Simpson
- Jeanette Winterson

=== 2003 ===
- Monica Ali
- Nicola Barker
- Rachel Cusk
- Peter Ho Davies
- Susan Elderkin
- Philip Hensher
- A. L. Kennedy
- Hari Kunzru
- Toby Litt
- David Mitchell
- Andrew O'Hagan
- David Peace
- Dan Rhodes
- Ben Rice
- Rachel Seiffert
- Zadie Smith
- Adam Thirlwell
- Alan Warner
- Sarah Waters
- Robert McLiam Wilson

=== 2013 ===
- Naomi Alderman
- Tahmima Anam
- Ned Beauman
- Jenni Fagan
- Adam Foulds
- Xiaolu Guo
- Sarah Hall
- Steven Hall
- Joanna Kavenna
- Benjamin Markovits
- Nadifa Mohamed
- Helen Oyeyemi
- Ross Raisin
- Sunjeev Sahota
- Taiye Selasi
- Kamila Shamsie
- Zadie Smith
- David Szalay
- Adam Thirlwell
- Evie Wyld

=== 2023 ===
- Graeme Armstrong
- Jennifer Atkins
- Sara Baume
- Sarah Bernstein
- Natasha Brown
- Eleanor Catton
- Lauren Aimee Curtis
- Eliza Clark
- Tom Crewe
- Camilla Grudova
- Isabella Hammad
- Sophie Mackintosh
- Anna Metcalfe
- Thomas Morris
- Derek Owusu
- K Patrick
- Yara Rodrigues Fowler
- Saba Sams
- Olivia Sudjic
- Eley Williams

== Granta Best of Young American Novelists ==
=== 1996 ===
- Sherman Alexie
- Madison Smartt Bell
- Ethan Canin
- Edwidge Danticat
- Tom Drury
- Tony Earley
- Jeffrey Eugenides
- Jonathan Franzen
- David Guterson
- David Haynes
- Allen Kurzweil
- Elizabeth McCracken
- Lorrie Moore
- Fae Myenne Ng
- Robert O'Connor
- Chris Offutt
- Stewart O'Nan
- Mona Simpson
- Melanie Rae Thon
- Kate Wheeler
- Katharine Weber

=== 2007 ===
- Daniel Alarcón
- Kevin Brockmeier
- Judy Budnitz
- Christopher Coake
- Anthony Doerr
- Jonathan Safran Foer
- Nell Freudenberger
- Olga Grushin
- Dara Horn
- Gabe Hudson
- Uzodinma Iweala
- Nicole Krauss
- Rattawut Lapcharoensap
- Yiyun Li
- Maile Meloy
- ZZ Packer
- Jess Row
- Karen Russell
- Akhil Sharma
- Gary Shteyngart
- John Wray

=== 2017 ===
- Jesse Ball
- Halle Butler
- Emma Cline
- Joshua Cohen
- Mark Doten
- Jen George
- Rachel B. Glaser
- Lauren Groff
- Yaa Gyasi
- Garth Risk Hallberg
- Greg Jackson
- Sana Krasikov
- Catherine Lacey
- Ben Lerner
- Karan Mahajan
- Anthony Marra
- Dinaw Mengestu
- Ottessa Moshfegh
- Chinelo Okparanta
- Esmé Weijun Wang
- Claire Vaye Watkins

== Granta Best of Young Spanish-Language Novelists ==
=== 2010 ===
- Andrés Barba
- Oliverio Coelho
- Federico Falco
- Pablo Gutiérrez
- Rodrigo Hasbún
- Sonia Hernández
- Carlos Labbé
- Javier Montes
- Elvira Navarro
- Matías Néspolo
- Andrés Neuman
- Alberto Olmos
- Pola Oloixarac
- Antonio Ortuño
- Patricio Pron
- Lucía Puenzo
- Andrés Ressia Colino
- Santiago Roncagliolo
- Samanta Schweblin
- Andrés Felipe Solano
- Carlos Yushimito
- Alejandro Zambra

=== 2021 ===
- Andrea Abreu
- José Adiak Montoya
- David Aliaga
- Carlos Manuel Álvarez
- José Ardila
- Gonzalo Baz
- Miluska Benavides
- Martín Felipe Castagnet
- Andrea Chapela
- Camila Fabbri
- Paulina Flores
- Carlos Fonseca Suárez
- Mateo García Elizondo
- Aura García-Junco
- Munir Hachemi
- Dainerys Machado Vento
- Estanislao Medina Huesca
- Cristina Morales
- Alejandro Morellón
- Michel Nieva
- Mónica Ojeda
- Eudris Planche Savón
- Irene Reyes-Noguerol
- Aniela Rodríguez
- Diego Zúñiga

== Granta Best of Young Brazilian Novelists ==
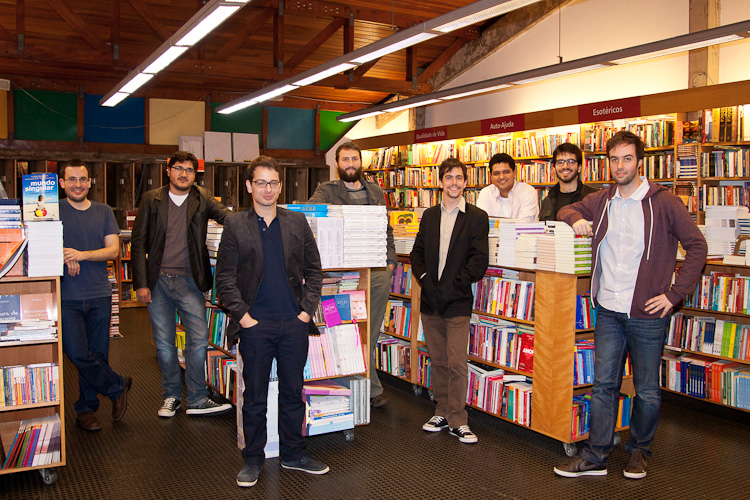
From left to right: Antonio Prata, Javier Arancibia, Leandro Sarmatz, Julian Fuks, Antonio Xerxenesky, Vinicius Jatoba, Miguel del Castillo and Emilio Fraia

=== 2012 ===
- Cristhiano Aguiar
- Javier Arancibia Contreras
- Vanessa Barbara
- Carol Bensimon
- Miguel del Castillo
- João Paulo Cuenca
- Laura Erber
- Emilio Fraia
- Julian Fuks
- Daniel Galera
- Luisa Geisler
- Vinicius Jatobá
- Michel Laub
- Ricardo Lísias
- Chico Mattoso
- Antonio Prata
- Carola Saavedra
- Tatiana Salem Levy
- Leandro Sarmatz
- Antonio Xerxenesky

== See also ==
- List of Granta issues
- The Isis Magazine and Cherwell (newspaper), publications at the University of Oxford, both named after Oxford rivers
