= Chico Mattoso =

Chico Mattoso (born 1978) is a Brazilian writer, translator and screenwriter. He was born in Paris. He studied at the University of Sao Paulo. Between 2002 and 2005, he was editor of the literary magazine Ácaro. He wrote Cabras (1999), in partnership with Antonio Prata, Paulo Werneck and José Vicente da Veiga, and Parati para Mim (2003), with João Paulo Cuenca and Santiago Nazarian.

In 2007 he released his first novel Longe de Ramiro, which was nominated for the Jabuti Award. This was followed by Nunca va estar in 2011. In 2012 he was selected as one of the best young Brazilian writers by the British magazine Granta.

He moved to Chicago, where he studied screenwriting at Northwestern University. He is the head writer and co-creator of Pico da Neblina on HBO Latino and is also known for Rio, I Love You (2014) and Amor e Sorte (2020).
