= Hampstead novel =

English fiction genre

Hampstead novel is a term used – often in a derogatory sense – to describe a particular genre of English fiction. Journalist and literary critic Kate Kellaway has described it as "a middle-class morality novel – probably involving adultery and shallow-masquerading-as-deep." Author and journalist Bill Buford calls it "middle class monologue". A novel in this genre takes place in the affluent Hampstead area of London, or in a similar neighbourhood. One novelist who is particularly often associated with the Hampstead novel is Margaret Drabble. Other authors considered proponents of the style include Margaret Forster, Fay Weldon, Penelope Lively, Kingsley Amis, Ian McEwan, Melvyn Bragg and Zoë Heller.

One criticism of the Hampstead novel is that it is narrow-minded and normative. Mainstream and science fiction novelist Iain Banks complained that it sent the message: "We're top dog, we're not a genre, we're the main thing". Others have seen the criticism as unfair. About Drabble in particular, it has been said that her "social and political terms of reference are among the widest of her generation." Drabble herself has pointed out that the Hampstead of her youth was in fact not the parochial, middle class society of the stereotype, but "intellectual, progressive, benign". She also alleges that the term is an invention of the "Thatcherite press", but – even though its origins are unclear – it is of an older date than this.
