= Ressia (surname) =

Ressia is a surname. Notable people with the surname include:

- Andrés Ressia Colino (born 1977), Uruguayan writer
- Romina Ressia (born 1981), Argentine photographer and artist
