= Nespolo (surname) =

Nespolo is a surname. Notable people with the surname include:

- Carla Federica Nespolo (1943–2020), Italian politician
- Matías Néspolo (born 1975), Argentine writer and journalist
- Ugo Nespolo (born 1941), Italian painter and sculptor
