= Vinicius Jatobá =

Brazilian journalist

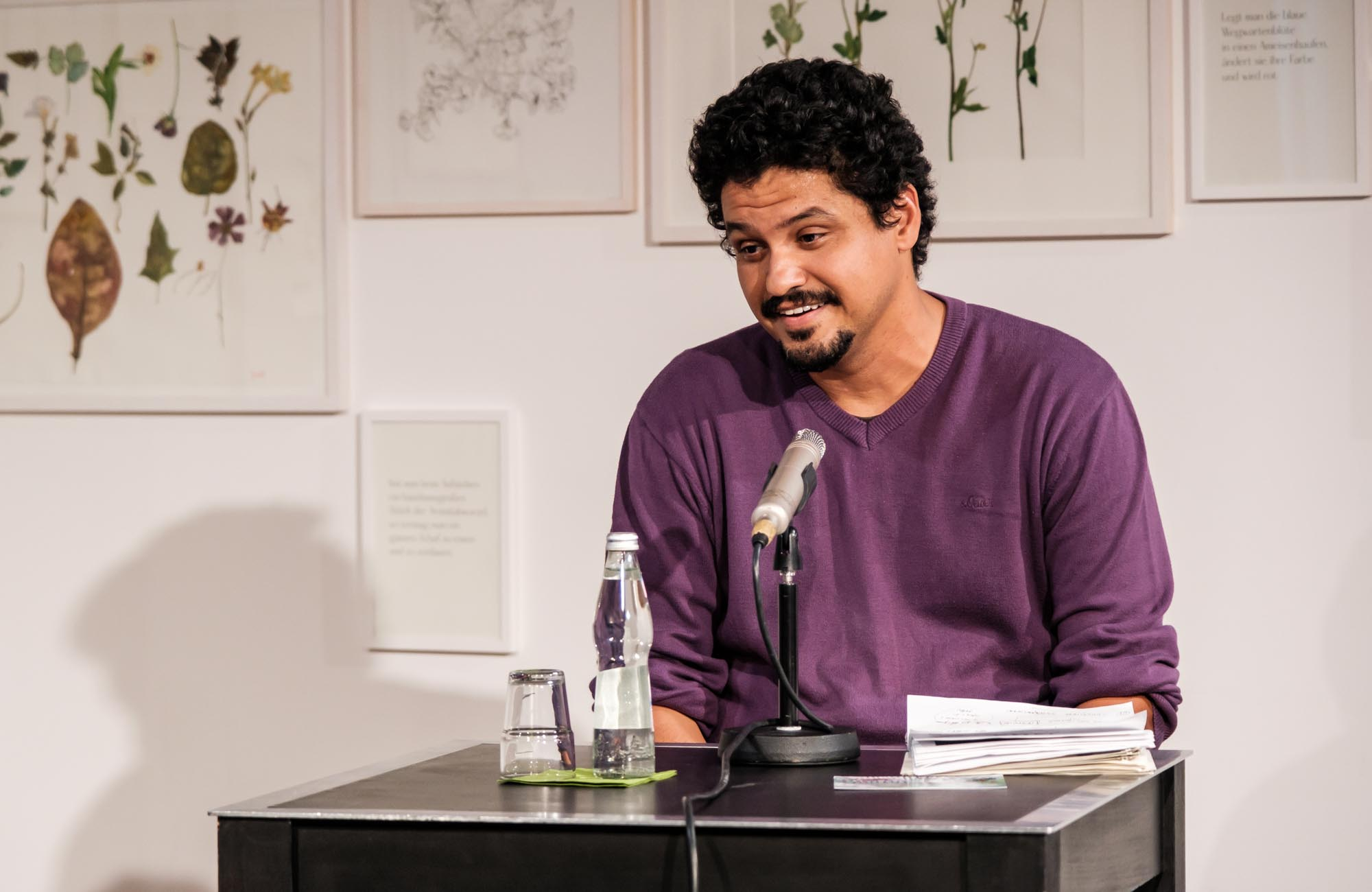
- Literaturhaus Stuttgart 2020
- Born: 1980 (age 45–46)
- Occupations: Journalist and writer

Vinicius Jatobá (Rio de Janeiro, 1980) is a Brazilian journalist and writer. He writes in various genres including short stories, critical articles, and essays and theatre plays.

== Biography and career ==
A graduate in social sciences at the Universidade Federal Fluminense, Jatobá holds a PhD in comparative literature from PUC-Rio with a thesis on the Portuguese writer António Lobo Antunes. For over a decade he wrote literary criticism for leading Brazilian magazines and newspapers such as O Estado de S. Paulo, Rascunho, Terra Magazine, Correiro Braziliense, and Entre Livros.

Before his inclusion in the Granta Magazine edition of The Best of Young Brazilian Novelists in 2012, Jatobá has published few stories in anthologies and magazines. On his contribution to the anthology, Melanie Rae Thon wrote: "Mesmerizing, incantatory, Vinicius Jatobá’s ‘Still Life’ is an eighteen-page lyric poem, a single sentence spanning generations, a broken-open elegy vast enough to be a novel."

Since his inclusion in the Granta anthology, Vinicius Jatobá's short stories have been translated into English, Spanish, German and French, and published at World Without Borders, Caminho, Ragpicker Press, Wagenbach, and Schloss Post, Párrafo Magazine, among others.

In 2012 Vinicius Jatobá won the National Literary Prize City of Belo Horizonte for his one-act play "First Love". He participated in three editions of the Climate Change Theatre Action, having his theatre sketches performed in Canada, EUA, England, Italy and Austria.

In 2016 he was a resident at the Cité internationale des arts, in Paris, supported by the Icatu Prize for Arts. In the same year, he was a Fellow of the City of Paris International Artists and Writers Residency Program at the Centre International d'Accueil et d'Échanges des Récollets.

Starting in 2016 he participated in three editions of the Climate Change Theatre Action, having his theatre sketches performed in Canada, EUA, England, Italy and Austria. In 2017, he was granted the Criar Lusofonia research fellowship from the Portuguese Centro Nacional de Cultura.

In 2018 he was selected by the Egyptian writer Ahdaf Soueif for a literature fellowship at the Akademie Schloss Solitude, in Stuttgart. There he wrote and directed political satirical sketches performed at the Schaulspiel Stuttgart Nordlabor.

After a cultural exchange project in Zagreb, Croatia, Jatobá returned to Germany for a festival at the Literaturhaus Stuttgart, in 2020. At the same institution, he took part in the panel "Fokus Brasilien: Kultur in Zeiten von Corona".

For the 2020–21 season Vinicius Jatobá was a writer-in-residence at the Theatre Freiburg, in Germany. After a season plagued by the COVID-19 lockdown, he had his satirical sketches "Polaroids" performed in the 2021 Summer Stage Festival. Also in 2021, Jatobá reimagined a scene from Henrik Ibsen's "A Doll's House" for the project "Chöre des Spekulativen", performed at Uferstudios Berlin.

García Marquez, Woolf, Faulkner, Terence Rattigan, Raduan Nassar, and Bohumil Hrabal are among his favorite writers.

Vinicius Jatobá mistrusts the novel as a form because "it recounts the human experience in a way that people do not experience it, our memories are organized according to the principle of condensation – we convey only the essential." He has concentrated his writing on short stories and theatre sketches. "The characters decide whether they want to be part of a short story or a dramatic piece. Sometimes I start a short story, and it becomes a dramatic piece, and vice versa."
