= A Down Home Meal for These Difficult Times =

2022 short stories collection by Meron Hadero

- Author: Meron Hadero
- Language: English
- Publisher: Restless Books
- Publication date: 2022
- Pages: 224 (first edition)
- ISBN: 978-1-63206-118-8

A Down Home Meal for These Difficult Times is a 2022 short stories collection by Ethiopian-American writer Meron Hadero. Her debut short stories collection, it won the 2020 Restless Books Prize for New Immigrant Writing and was published by Restless Books in 2022. The short stories collection includes "The Street Sweep" which won the 2021 Caine Prize.

== Background ==
Hadero was born in Addis Ababa, Ethiopia relocated to the United States as a child through Germany. She earned her bachelor's degrees at Princeton University, a Juris Doctor in Yale and an MFA at the University of Michigan.

The short stories collection won the 2020 Restless Books Prize for New Immigrant Writing and was published in 2022 by Restless Books.

== Awards and reception ==
"The Street Sweep" which was included in the collection won the 2021 Caine Prize.

Terry Hong writing for The Christian Science Monitor praised the narrative of the stories and the writers "prodigious storytelling". The book received a starred review from Kirkus Reviews, which concluded with the description: "Entertaining and affecting stories with a deft lightness of touch." Eileen Gonzalez of Foreword called it a "heartfelt collection about the highs, lows, and ordinary days of Ethiopian life" while Publishers Weekly called it an "assured debut is well worth a look."
