= Adam Thirlwell =

British novelist and essayist

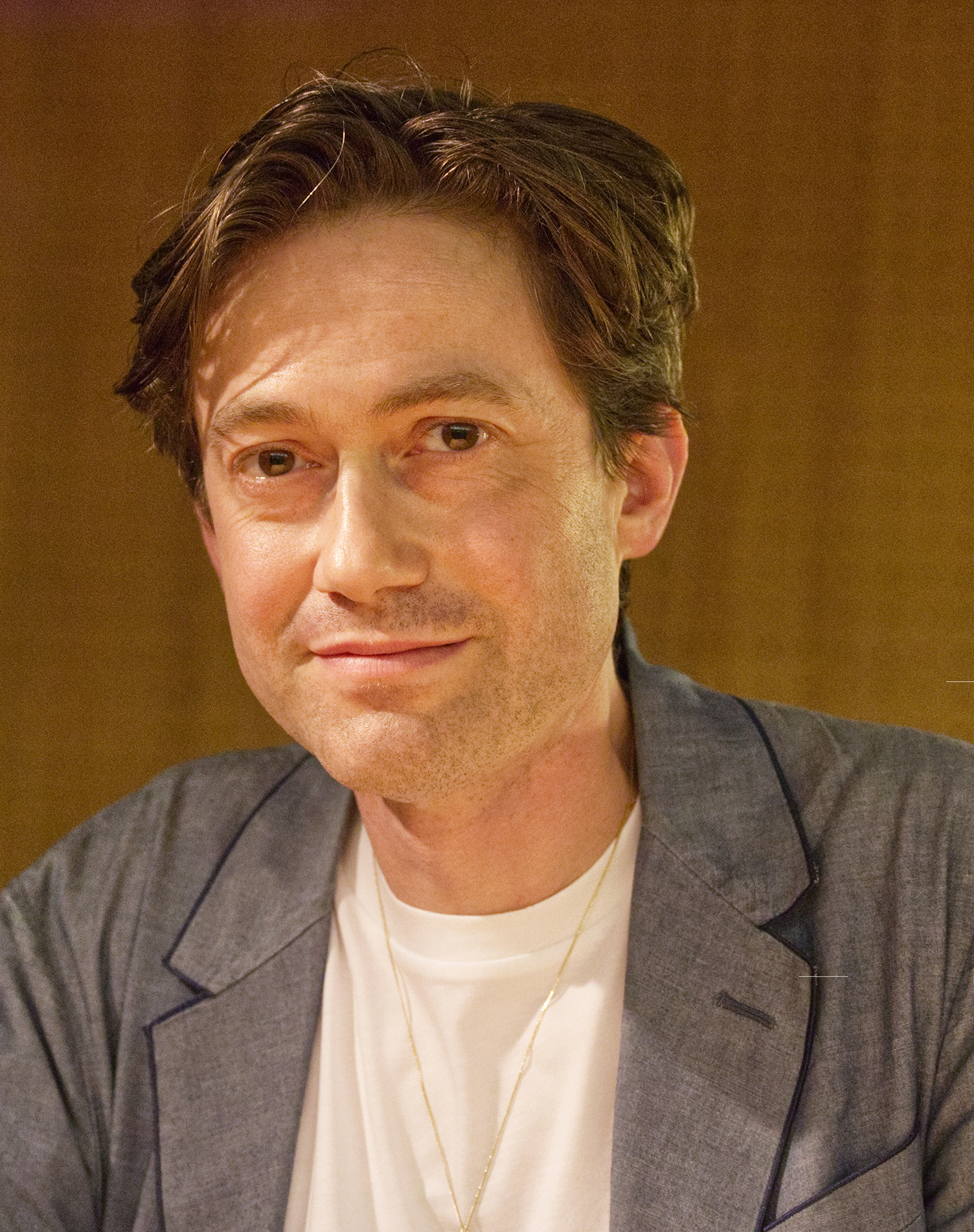
Thirlwell in 2023

Adam Thirlwell FRSL (born 22 August 1978) is a British novelist and essayist. His work has been translated into thirty languages. He has twice been named as one of Granta's Best of Young British Novelists (in 2003 and 2013). In 2015, he received the E.M. Forster Award from the American Academy of Arts and Letters. He is an advisory editor of The Paris Review.

== Early life and education ==
Thirlwell was educated at the independent Haberdashers' Boys' School, Elstree. He read English at New College, Oxford, where he earned a first-class degree in 2000. He was a Prize Fellow of All Souls College, Oxford, between 2000 and 2007, and worked as assistant editor at the literary magazine Areté. He now lives in London.

In 2011, he served as the Samuel Fischer Guest Professor of Comparative Literature at the Freie Universität Berlin. In 2015, he was named an Honorary Fellow of the Metaphysical Club at the Domus Academy in Milan.

== Work ==
Thirlwell is the author of four novels: Politics (2003), The Escape (2009), described by Milan Kundera as "a novel where the humour is melancholic, the melancholy mischievous, and the talent startling", Lurid & Cute (2015), and The Future Future (2023).

His essay collection and reflection on translation and the history of the European novel was published in 2007 as Miss Herbert in the United Kingdom and as The Delighted States in the United States. It was chosen as a book of the year by Tom Stoppard in The Guardian and A. S. Byatt in the Times Literary Supplement. He guest-edited Multiples, an anthology exploring translation and experimental rewriting, published as an issue of McSweeney's Quarterly in 2013. In 2019, he co-curated Studio Créole with Hans Ulrich Obrist, an international performance piece featuring novelists and simultaneous interpreters which premiered at the Manchester International Festival.

His experimental book with unfolding pages, Kapow!, was designed by Studio Frith and published by Visual Editions in 2012. It was nominated for the Design Museum's 2013 Designs of the Year awards and acquired by the Art Institute of Chicago for its permanent collection. A collaborative monograph with artist Philippe Parreno, Conversation, was published by the Serralves Museum in 2017. He has also engaged in cross-disciplinary projects exploring the relationship between urbanism, architecture, and contemporary fiction.

Thirlwell wrote the short film Everyday Performance Artists (2016) for Channel 4's Random Acts, directed by Polly Stenham and featuring the voice of Shia LaBeouf, with Gemma Chan, James Norton, and Nathan Stewart-Jarrett. In 2018, he wrote and directed the film Utopia, starring Lily Cole, Lily McMenamy, and Babirye Bukilwa.

He contributes regularly to publications such as The New York Review of Books, London Review of Books, The New York Times, The Times Literary Supplement, and The Guardian. In May 2015, he was named London editor of The Paris Review.

In June 2018, Thirlwell was elected a Fellow of the Royal Society of Literature under its "40 Under 40" initiative.

== Awards and honours ==
- 2003: Granta "Best of Young British Novelists"
- 2004: Betty Trask Award, winner for Politics
- 2005: Lire "50 écrivains pour demain"
- 2008: Somerset Maugham Award, winner for Miss Herbert
- 2009: Encore Award, shortlist for The Escape
- 2013: Granta "Best of Young British Novelists"
- 2015: E.M. Forster Award, winner from the American Academy of Arts and Letters
- 2018: Fellow of the Royal Society of Literature (FRSL)
- 2024: Orwell Prize for Political Fiction, shortlist for The Future Future
- 2024: Jan Michalski Prize, nominee for The Future Future
- 2025: Premio Gregor von Rezzori, shortlist for The Future Future

== Bibliography ==
=== Novels ===
- Politics (2003) ISBN 978-0-224-07119-2
- The Escape (2009) ISBN 978-0-224-08691-2
- Kapow! (2012) ISBN 978-0-956-56925-7
- Lurid & Cute (2015) ISBN 978-0-224-09941-7
- The Future Future (2023) ISBN 978-1-787-33440-3

=== Non-fiction and essays ===
- Miss Herbert (UK) / The Delighted States (US) (2007) ISBN 978-0-224-07386-8

=== As editor ===
- Multiples: 12 Stories in 18 Languages by 61 Authors (2013) ISBN 978-1-938-07340-3
