= Emilio Fraia =

Brazilian writer, editor and journalist

Emilio Fraia (born 1982 in São Paulo) is a Brazilian writer, editor and journalist.

He worked as editor-in-chief and literature editor for Trip magazine, as a visual arts editor for Bravo! Magazine, and collaborated with Piauí magazine. He edited the literary magazine Givago, which published new authors between 1999 and 2005. Between 2009 and 2013 he was a literature editor for publisher Cosac Naify. As of 2019 he works for Companhia das Letras.

In 2008, together with Vanessa Barbara, he wrote his first novel O Verão do Chibo, finalist of that year's São Paulo Literature Prize.

In 2012, Fraia was one of the authors selected for the collection The Best Young Brazilian Writers of the British magazine Granta. In 2013 he wrote the graphic novel Campo em Branco, illustrated by DW Ribatski. In 2018 he published Sevastopol, a short story collection; one of the short stories was published in the December 9, 2019 issue of The New Yorker.

== Works ==
- 2008 - O Verão do Chibo (novel; with Vanessa Barbara)
- 2013 - Campo Em Branco (graphic novel; with DW Ribatski)
- 2019 - Sebastopol (short stories)
