= Irene Reyes-Noguerol =

Spanish writer

Irene Reyes-Noguerol is a Spanish writer. She was born in Seville in 1997. She studied Spanish philology at the Universidad de Sevilla. She published her first solo book at the age of 18: Caleidoscopios (Ediciones en Huida). Her next book was De Homero y otros dioses.

Her work has been published in numerous anthologies, and she has won many prizes, among them the Tigre Juan Young Writers’ Award, the Brocense Award and the Camilo José Cela Award. In 2021, she was named by Granta magazine as one of the best young writers in the Spanish language.
