= Ursula Bentley =

British writer (1945–2004)

Ursula Bentley (18 September 1945 – 7 April 2004) was a British writer.

== Early life ==
Ursula Mary Bentley was born in Sheffield, South Yorkshire, 18 September 1945. A couple hours after her birth her mother died of blood loss leaving her father to raise her along with her two older brothers. Her eldest brother was Chris Bentley, born in 1936, who died at age 29. Her other older brother is the actor and writer Paul Bentley, born in 1942.

== Personal life and literary works ==
Ursula Bentley first studied medical training but then switched to English at Manchester University. She graduated in 1969 and married geologist Alan Bruce Thompson in the same year. In 1976 the married pair moved to Switzerland. It is there that she composed her first novel The Natural Order in 1982. The success of this book led her to being named in the inaugural "Best of British Young Novelists" list by Granta magazine. Her second book Private Accounts came out in 1986. She had two children. She returned to the UK to renew her life and published more novels: The Angel Of Twickenham (1996) and The Sloping Experience (1999). Living in Suffolk.

== Awards and honours ==
- "Best of Young British Novelists" in 1983
