= Lana Bastašić =

Bosnian writer

- Лана Басташић
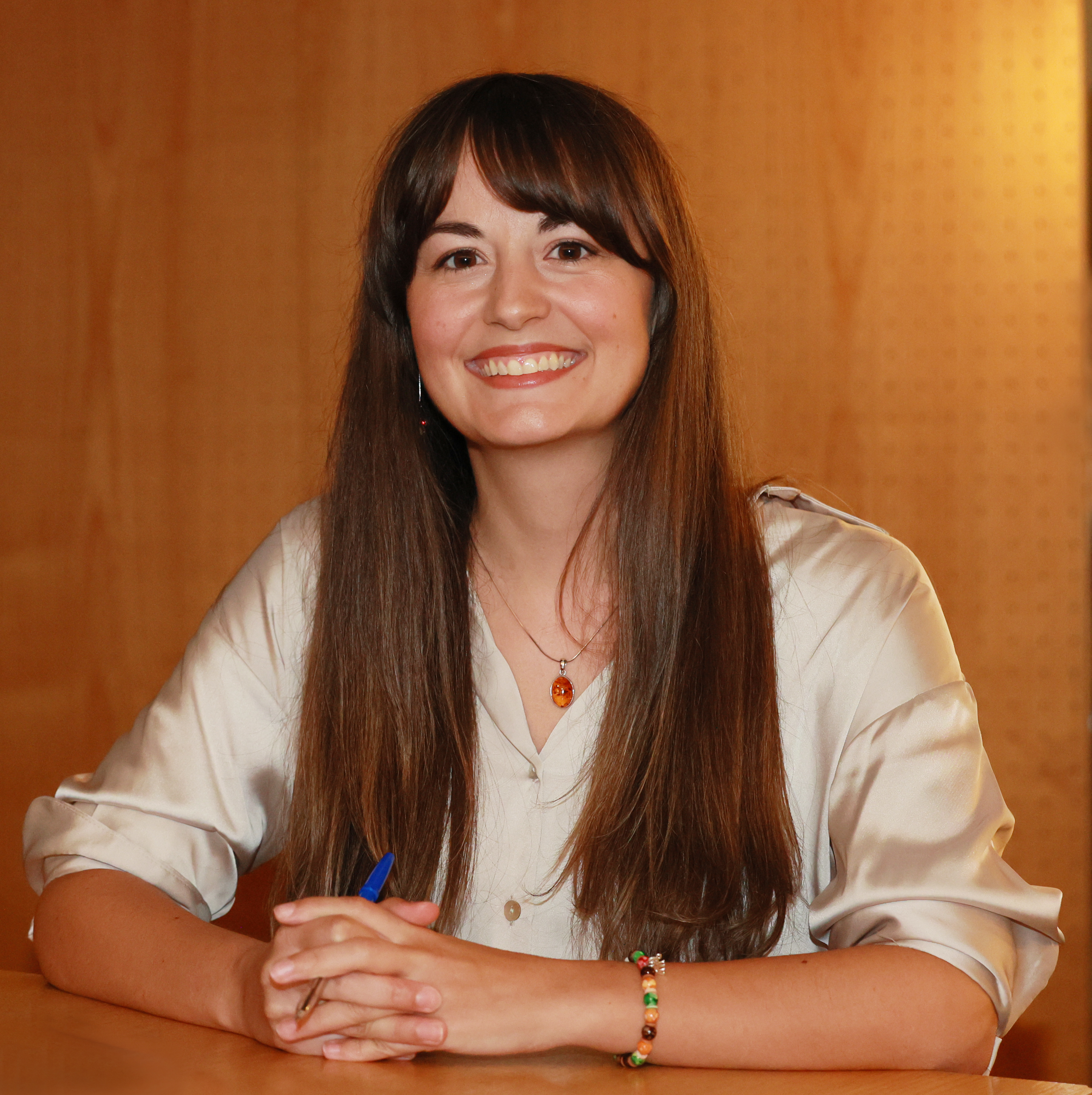
- Bastašić in 2023
- Born: 27 August 1986 (age 40); Zagreb, SR Croatia, SFR Yugoslavia
- Citizenship: Croatian; Serbian (from 2021)
- Education: University of Banja Luka, University of Belgrade
- Occupations: Novelist, translator
- Writing career
- Notable work: Catch the Rabbit
- Notable awards: 2020 European Union Prize for Literature

Lana Bastašić (Serbian Cyrillic: Лана Басташић; born 27 August 1986) is a Bosnian writer, novelist and translator.

== Early life and education ==
She was born in Zagreb, SR Croatia, SFR Yugoslavia to a Serb family in 1986 that had historically lived in Croatia for generations. Due to the rise of nationalism throughout Yugoslavia and the intense social and political crisis at the time, the family moved out from Croatia when she was a young child, first to Slovenia and then to Bosnia-Herzegovina, where they settled in Banja Luka. Due to her place of birth, she acquired Croatian citizenship after the breakup of Yugoslavia. She studied English at the University of Banja Luka and received an MA in Cultural Studies from the University of Belgrade.

== Career ==
Bastašić's debut novel Catch the Rabbit (Serbian: Uhvati zeca) was published in Belgrade in 2018, and then reprinted in Sarajevo. The structure of the book draws inspiration from Alice's Adventures in Wonderland with themes of exile, identity, and is divided into twelve chapters, as is Alice's Adventures in Wonderland. It won the 2020 EU Prize for Literature and was shortlisted for the NIN Award. It was translated into English by Bastašić herself and published by Picador in the UK and Restless Books in the US. In 2017, Bastašić has signed the Declaration on the Common Language of the Croats, Serbs, Bosniaks and Montenegrins.

In addition to novels, Bastašić has written in many different genres: short stories, children’s stories, poetry, and stage plays.

In January 2024, Bastašić terminated her contract with German publisher S Fischer, accusing it of silence on the Gaza crisis and censoring pro-Palestinian voices in Germany. Later that month, she revealed on Instagram that she has been disinvited from an Austrian literature festival, the Literature Festival Salzburg. The festival organizers cited the ongoing discussion around her publisher departure, stating that her participation would imply a stance they wished to avoid.

== Personal life ==
As of 2023, she was living in Belgrade. She acquired Serbian citizenship in 2021. Aside from her Bosnian passport, she also has a Croatian passport that uses more frequently for EU travel.

== Bibliography ==
=== Short story collections ===
- Permanent Pigments (Trajni pigmenti), 2010. ISBN 9788673980522
- Fireworks (Vatrometi), 2013
- Milk Teeth (Mliječni zubi), 2020. ISBN 9789533582986

=== Novels ===
- Catch the Rabbit (Uhvati zeca), 2021. ISBN 9781529039610
