= Meron Hadero =

Ethiopian American writer

- Born: Addis Ababa, Ethiopia
- Education: Princeton University; University of Michigan (MFA); Yale Law School (JD)
- Writing career
- Genre: Literary fiction
- Notable work: A Down Home Meal for These Difficult Times (2022)
- Notable awards: Yaddo, Ragdale, MacDowell fellowships
- Website: www.meronhadero.com

Meron Hadero is an Ethiopian American writer. She is known for her debut collection, A Down Home Meal for These Difficult Times published in 2022 by Restless Books.

== Biography ==
An immigrant to Germany residing in United States, she earned her degree in history from Princeton University, MFA from University of Michigan and JD from Yale Law School.

Hadero's work has appeared in The Best American Short Stories, Ploughshares, Timothy McSweeney's Quarterly Concern, Zyzzyva, Addis Ababa Noir, and 40 Short Stories: A Portable Anthology. She has received the Yaddo, Ragdale, and MacDowell fellowships and was a Steinbeck Fellow at San Jose State University.

Her debut short-story collection, A Down Home Meal for These Difficult Times, was published in 2022 by Restless Books. It won the Restless Books Prize for New Immigrant Writing and "The Street Sweep", included in the collection, won the 2021 Caine Prize for African Writing. It was also a finalist for the PEN/Robert W. Bingham Prize in 2023.

In addition to writing, Meron served as a research analyst for the Bill and Melinda Gates Foundation.

== Awards and honors ==
=== Literary awards ===
Year	Title	Award	Result	Ref.
2020	A Down Home Meal for These Difficult Times ^{α}	Restless Books Prize for New Immigrant Writing	Won	
2021	"The Street Sweep"	Caine Prize for African Writing	Won	
2023	A Down Home Meal for These Difficult Times	Hurston/Wright Legacy Award	Won	
2023	A Down Home Meal for These Difficult Times	PEN/Robert W. Bingham Prize	Finalist	

=== Award notes ===
^{α} Formerly called Preludes at the time given

== Bibliography ==
=== Collections ===
- —— (2022). A Down Home Meal for These Difficult Times (hardcover 1st ed.). Brooklyn: Restless Books. ISBN 9781632061188.
