= Cristhiano Aguiar =

Brazilian writer

Cristhiano Motta Aguiar is a Brazilian writer, critic and academic. He studied literature at the Federal University of Pernambuco, and pursued a doctorate at the Mackenzie Presbyterian University. A section of his doctoral research was published under the title Narratives and Fictional Spaces: An Introduction (Editora Mackenzie, 2017). He teaches literature at Mackenzie Presbyterian University. His research interests include contemporary Latin American fiction and genre literature (horror, science fiction and fantasy).

As a writer, he has published two collections of short stories:

- Na outra margem, o Leviatã (Lote 42, 2018)
- Gótico Nordestino (Companhia das Letras, 2022) - winner of the Clarice Lispector Award for Best Short Story Collection, and the Order of Book Merit medal awarded by the Biblioteca Nacional.

His next book is a novel. In 2012, he was named as one of the best young Brazilian writers by Granta magazine. He is a frequent guest at literary events, such as FLIP (International Literary Festival of Paraty) and the Book Biennial of São Paulo.
