= Antônio Xerxenesky =

Brazilian writer

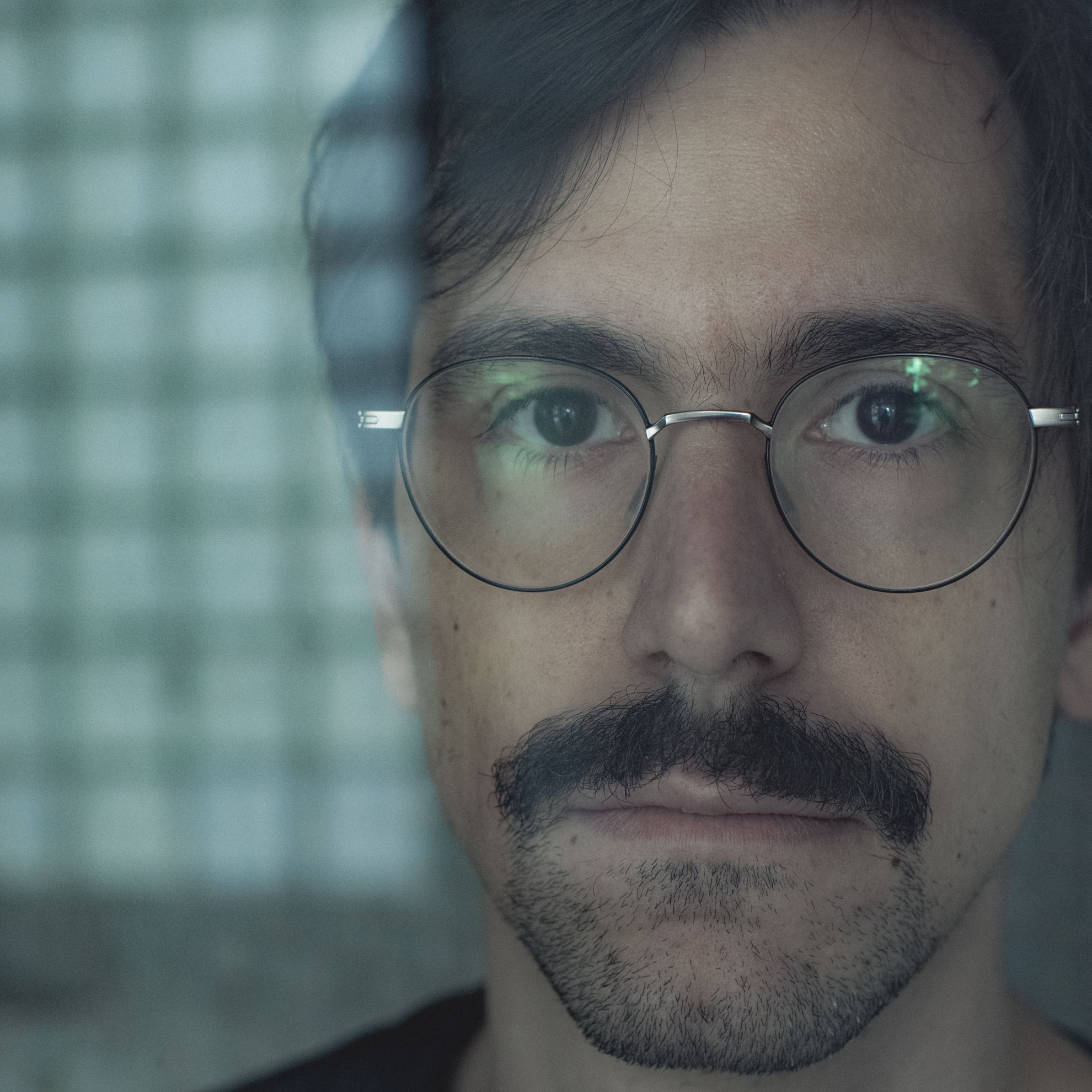
Antônio Xerxenesky

Antônio Xerxenesky (born 1984) is a Brazilian writer, translator and editor. Born in Porto Alegre, he is known for books such as Areia nos dentes (debut novel, 2008), A página assombrada por fantasmas (short stories, 2011) and As perguntas (2017). Xerxenesky is a PhD in literary theory at the University of São Paulo. He is a regular contributor to newspapers, magazines and blogs. His work has been adapted for TV (namely the short story ‘O desvio’ in 2007). His fiction has been translated into English, French, Spanish, Italian and Arabic. He is also a translator, having translated Fernanda Melchor's acclaimed novel Hurricane Season to Portuguese.

In 2012, he was named by Granta magazine as one of the best young Brazilian writers. He attended the International Writing Program at the University of Iowa in 2015 and has also done a residency at the Fondation Jan Michalski in Montricher, Switzerland.

Xerxenesky's book Uma tristeza infinita (2021) was awarded the São Paulo Prize for Literature in 2022.

He lives in São Paulo.
