= Vanessa Barbara =

Brazilian journalist and author

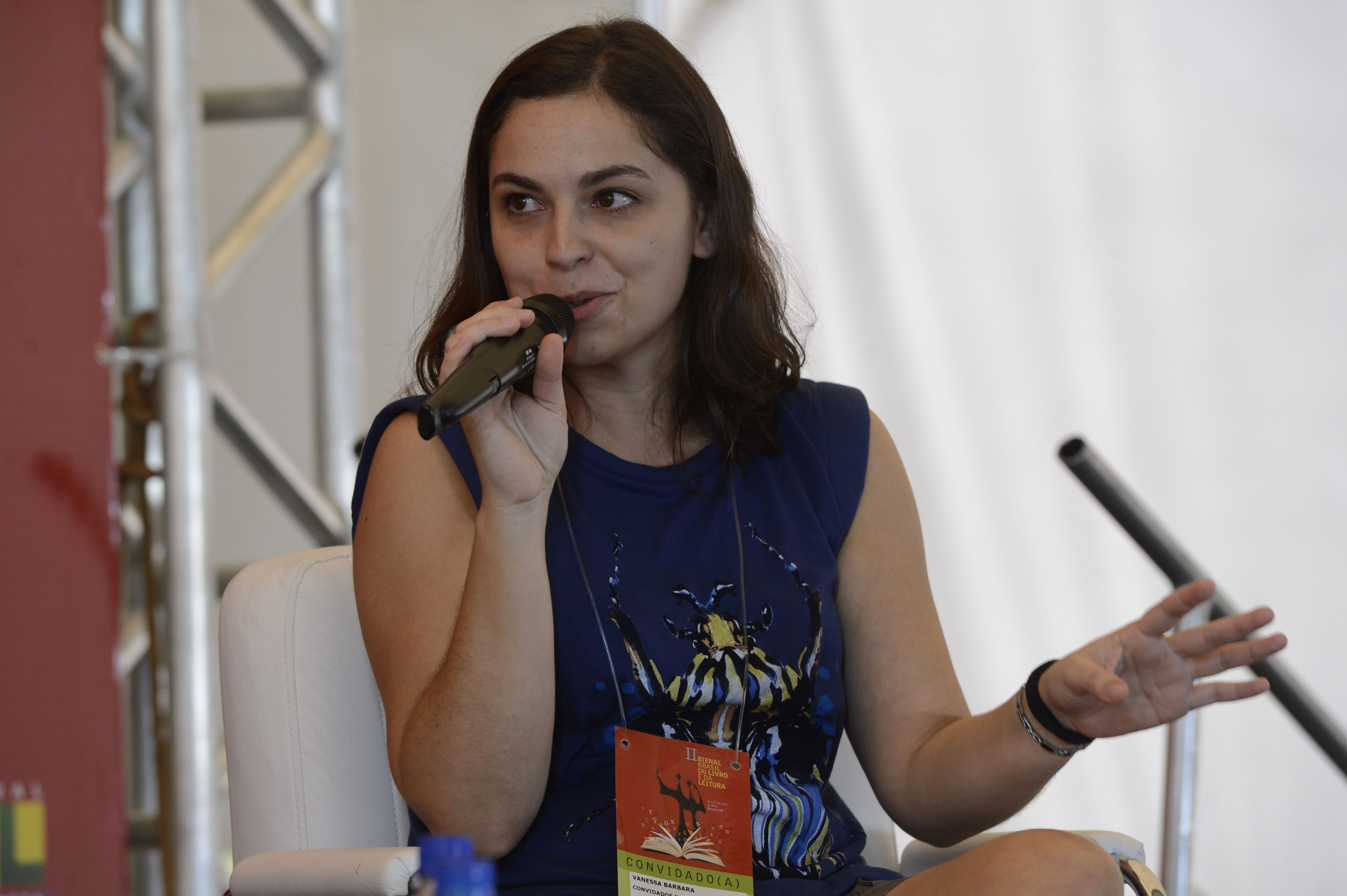
- Born: 14 June 1982 (age 44); São Paulo, Brazil
- Occupation: Author
- Writing career
- Language: Portuguese
- Genres: Fiction, journalism
- Website: www.hortifruti.org

Vanessa Barbara (born June 14, 1982) is a Brazilian journalist and author. She is a columnist for the newspaper O Estado de S. Paulo, having also written for the magazine piauí and the newspaper Folha de S. Paulo. Her articles are also featured in the International New York Times.

Barbara won the 2009 Jabuti Prize in Journalism for her work O Livro Amarelo do Terminal, about the Tietê Bus Terminal. She was shortlisted for the São Paulo Prize for Literature in 2008 for her debut book O Verão do Chibo. She was also listed by Granta among the Best of Young Brazilian Novelists in 2012.

== Works ==
- 2008 - O Verão do Chibo (novel, with Emilio Fraia) - Alfaguara
- 2009 - O livro amarelo do Terminal (news story) - Cosac Naify
- 2010 - Endrigo, O Escavador de Umbigos (children's book, with Andrés Sandoval) - Editora 34
- 2012 - A máquina de Goldberg (graphic novel, with Fido Nesti) - Companhia das Letras
- 2013 - Noites de alface (novel) - Alfaguara
- 2014 - O louco de palestra: e outras crônicas urbanas (crônicas) - Companhia das Letras
- 2015 - Operação Impensável (novel)- Intrínseca
- 2023 - Mamãe está cansada (children's book, with Laura Trochmann (illustrator)- Cia. das Letrinhas
- 2024 -Três Camadas de Noite (novel)- Fósforo

== Awards and recognitions ==
- 2009 São Paulo Prize for Literature — Shortlisted in the Best Book of the Year category for O Verão do Chibo
- 2012 Granta Best of Young Brazilian Novelists
