= Gonzalo Baz =

Uruguayan writer and publisher

Gonzalo Baz (born 1985) is an Uruguayan writer and publisher. He was born in Montevideo. He runs the publishing house Pez en el Hielo and is a member of the Sancocho collective of independent artists and publishers. He has published two works of fiction till date:

- Animales que vuelven (Returning animals, Pez en el Hielo), winner of the 2018 Ópera Prima Award from the Uruguayan Ministry of Education
- Los pasajes comunes (The common passages, Criatura Editora, 2020), his debut novel

Baz is also a translator of Brazilian literature into Spanish. In 2021, he was named by Granta magazine as one of the best young writers in the Spanish language.
