= Luisa Geisler =

Brazilian writer

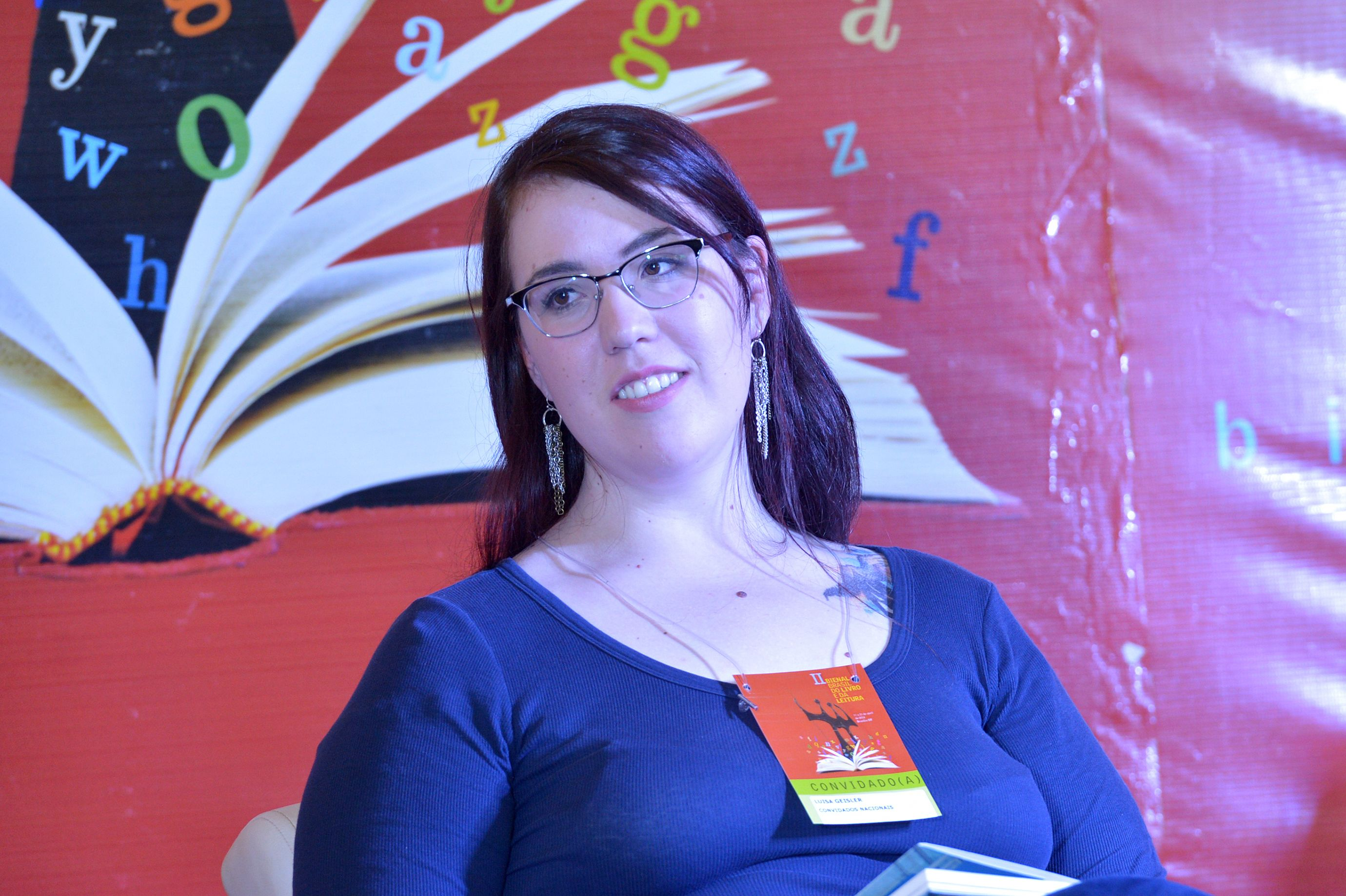
- Brazilian writer Luisa Geisler
- Born: 17 June 1991 (age 35); Canoas, Rio Grande do Sul, Brazil
- Education: Federal University of Rio Grande do Sul
- Occupation: Writer
- Writing career
- Period: 2010
- Genre: fiction
- Notable works: Contos de Mentira,Quiçá, Granta Best of Young Brazilian Novelists
- Notable awards: Prêmio Sesc for Writing; 2010/2011
- Website: luisageisler.tumblr.com//

Luisa Geisler (born 1991 in Canoas) is a Brazilian writer.

At the age of 19 she was awarded the 2010 Prêmio Sesc de Literatura (Sesc Prize for Literature) for her debut book, the short story collection Contos de Mentira. She won again the following year for the novel category with Quiçá.

In 2012, she was chosen to be part of the Granta short story collection for the Best Young Brazilian Writers. Geisler was the youngest writer to be selected for the collection.

== Bibliography ==
- Contos de Mentira: short story, 2011
- Quiçá, (novel), 2012
- Granta Best of Young Brazilian Novelists, (anthology; with the short story "Lion"), 2012

== See also ==
- Brazilian literature
