= José Adiak Montoya =

Nicaraguan writer

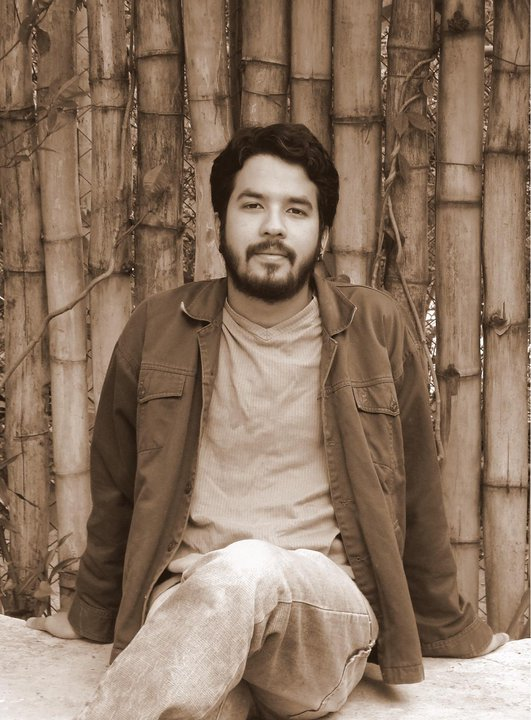
Picture of José Adiak Montoya

Jose Adiak Montoya is a Nicaraguan writer. He was born in Managua in 1987.

He is the author of several books, among them:

- Eclipse: prosa & poesía (2007)
- El sótano del angel (novel, 2010)
- Un rojo aullido en el bosque (2016)
- Lennon bajo el sol (Tusquets, 2017)
- Aunque nada perdure (Seix Barral, 2020)
- El país de las calles sin nombre (Seix Barral, 2021)

He has won several awards for his work. In 2016, he was recognized by the Guadalajara International Book Fair in its Ochenteros program, a selection of twenty of the best Latin American writers born in the 1980s. In a similar vein, Granta magazine named him as one of the best young writers in the Spanish language in 2021.

He lives in Mexico City.
