= List of Granta issues =

This is a list of Granta magazine issues.

== Issues ==
=== 1979–1989 ===
1. New American Writing, 1 September 1979, ISBN 0-14-014575-3
2. George Steiner: The Portage to San Cristobal of A.H., 1 March 1980, ISBN 0-14-014576-1
3. The End of The English Novel, 1 March 1980, ISBN 0-14-014577-X
4. Beyond the Crisis, 1 March 1981, ISBN 0-14-014578-8
5. Don Bloch: The Modern Common Wind, 1 March 1982, ISBN 0-14-014579-6
6. A Literature for Politics, 1 December 1982, ISBN 0-14-014580-X
7. Best of Young British Novelists, 1 March 1983, ISBN 0-14-014082-4
8. Dirty Realism: New Writing from America, 1 June 1983, ISBN 0-14-006869-4
9. John Berger: Boris, 1 September 1983, ISBN 0-14-006880-5
10. Travel Writing, 1 December 1983, ISBN 0-14-007052-4
11. Milan Kundera: Greetings from Prague, 1 March 1984, ISBN 0-14-007383-3
12. The True Adventures of the Rolling Stones, 1 June 1984, ISBN 0-14-007565-8
13. After the Revolution, 1 September 1984, ISBN 0-14-007566-6
14. Autobiography, 1 December 1984, ISBN 0-14-007567-4
15. James Fenton: The Fall of Saigon, 1 March 1985, ISBN 0-14-007581-X
16. Science, 1 June 1985, ISBN 0-14-008479-7
17. Graham Greene: While Waiting for a War, 1 September 1985, ISBN 0-14-008480-0
18. The Snap Revolution, 1 March 1986, ISBN 0-14-008482-7
19. More Dirt: The New American Fiction, 1 June 1986, ISBN 0-14-008595-5
20. In Trouble Again, 1 December 1986, ISBN 0-14-008597-1
21. The Story-Teller, 1 March 1987, ISBN 0-14-008599-8
22. Hanif Kureishi: With Your Tongue Down My Throat, 1 September 1987, ISBN 0-14-008602-1
23. Home, 1 March 1988, ISBN 0-14-008604-8
24. Inside Intelligence, 1 June 1988, ISBN 0-14-008606-4
25. Murder, 1 September 1988, ISBN 0-14-008608-0
26. Travel, 1 March 1989, ISBN 0-14-012356-3
27. Death, 1 June 1989, ISBN 0-14-012358-X
28. Birthday Special!, 1 September 1989, ISBN 0-14-012360-1
29. Jonathan Raban: New World, 1 December 1989, ISBN 0-14-012863-8

=== 1990–1999 ===
30. New Europe!, 1 March 1990, ISBN 0-14-013299-6
31. The General, 1 April 1990, ISBN 0-14-013431-X
32. History, 1 June 1990, ISBN 0-14-013856-0
33. What Went Wrong?, 1 June 1990, ISBN 0-14-013858-7
34. Simon Schama: Death of a Harvard Man, 1 August 1990, ISBN 0-14-013860-9
35. John le Carré: The Unbearable Peace, 1 April 1991, ISBN 0-14-014846-9
36. Mario Vargas Llosa: Vargas Llosa for President, 1 June 1991, ISBN 0-14-015208-3
37. The Family, 1 September 1991, ISBN 0-14-015207-5
38. We're So Happy!, 1 December 1991, ISBN 0-14-015211-3
39. The Body, 1 April 1992, ISBN 0-14-014049-2
40. Richard Ford: The Womanizer, 1 June 1992, ISBN 0-14-014054-9
41. Biography, 1 September 1992, ISBN 0-14-014052-2
42. Krauts!, 1 December 1992, ISBN 0-14-014056-5
43. Best of Young British Novelists 2, 1 March 1993, ISBN 0-14-014059-X
44. The Last Place on Earth, 1 June 1993, ISBN 0-14-014062-X
45. Ian Hamilton: Gazza Agonistes, 1 September 1993, ISBN 0-14-014065-4
46. Crime, 1 December 1993, ISBN 0-14-014067-0
47. Losers, 1 March 1994, ISBN 0-14-014083-2
48. Africa, 1 September 1994, ISBN 0-14-014084-0
49. Money, 1 December 1994, ISBN 0-14-014085-9
50. Fifty, 1 June 1995, ISBN 0-14-014104-9
51. Big Men (and L.A. Women), 1 September 1995, ISBN 0-14-014108-1
52. Food: The Vital Stuff, 1 December 1995, ISBN 0-14-014113-8
53. News, 1 March 1996, ISBN 0-14-014133-2
54. The Best of Young American Novelists, 1 June 1996, ISBN 0-14-014135-9
55. Children: Blind Bitter Happiness, 1 September 1996, ISBN 0-14-014141-3
56. What Happened to Us?: Britain's Valedictory Realism, 1 December 1996, ISBN 0-14-014143-X
57. India!: The Golden Jubilee, 1 March 1997, ISBN 0-14-014147-2
58. Ambition, 1 June 1997, ISBN 0-14-014148-0
59. France: The Outsider, 1 September 1997, ISBN 0-14-014151-0
60. Unbelievable, 1 December 1997, ISBN 0-14-014152-9
61. The Sea, 1 March 1998, ISBN 0-14-014153-7
62. What Young Men Do, 15 June 1998, ISBN 0-14-014154-5
63. Beasts, 1 September 1998, ISBN 0-14-014155-3
64. Russia: The Wild East, 1 December 1998, ISBN 0-14-014156-1
65. London: The Lives of the City, 1 February 1999, ISBN 0-14-014158-8
66. Truth + Lies, 1 May 1999, ISBN 0-9645611-6-6
67. Women and Children First, 1 September 1999, ISBN 0-9645611-7-4
68. Love Stories, 1 December 1999, ISBN 0-9645611-8-2

=== 2000–2009 ===
69. The Assassin, 1 April 2000, ISBN 9780964561199
70. Australia: The New New World, 1 July 2000, ISBN 9781929001002
71. Shrinks, 1 September 2000, ISBN 9781929001019
72. Overreachers, 1 December 2000, ISBN 9781929001026
73. Necessary Journeys, 1 March 2001, ISBN 9781929001033
74. Confessions of a Middle-Aged Ecstasy Eater, 7 July 2001, ISBN 9781929001040
75. Brief Encounters, 9 October 2001, ISBN 9781929001057
76. Music, 9 January 2002, ISBN 9781929001064
77. What We Think of America, 28 March 2002, ISBN 9781929001071
78. Bad Company, 15 June 2002, ISBN 9781929001088
79. Celebrity, 1 October 2002, ISBN 9781929001095
80. The Group: Pictures from Previous Lives, 9 January 2003, ISBN 9781929001101
81. Best of Young British Novelists 2003, 3 April 2003, ISBN 9781929001118
82. Life's Like That, 3 July 2003, ISBN 9781929001125
83. This Overheating World, 30 October 2003, ISBN 9781929001132
84. Over There: How America Sees the World, 1 January 2004, ISBN 9781929001149
85. Hidden Histories, 1 May 2004, ISBN 9781929001156
86. Film, 15 July 2004, ISBN 9781929001163
87. Jubilee!, 15 October 2004, ISBN 9781929001170
88. Mothers, 15 December 2004, ISBN 9781929001187
89. The Factory, 15 April 2005, ISBN 9781929001194
90. Country Life: Dispatches from What's Left of It, 15 August 2005, ISBN 9781929001200
91. Wish You Were Here, 15 September 2005, ISBN 9780903141802
92. The View from Africa, 15 January 2006, ISBN 9781929001224
93. God's Own Countries: Are You Living In One?, 14 April 2006, ISBN 9781929001231
94. On the Road Again: Where Travel Writing Went Next, 15 July 2006, ISBN 9781929001248
95. Loved Ones, 2 October 2006, ISBN 9781929001255
96. War Zones, 15 January 2007, ISBN 9780903141901
97. Best of Young American Novelists 2, 10 May 2007, ISBN 9780903141925
98. The Deep End, 2 July 2007, ISBN 9780903141949
99. What Happened Next, 5 October 2007, ISBN 9780903141963
100. Granta 100, 7 January 2008, ISBN 9781929001309
101. Granta 101, 2 April 2008, ISBN 9781905881017
102. The New Nature Writing, 7 July 2008, ISBN 9781905881024
103. The Rise of the British Jihad, 1 September 2008, ISBN 9781905881031
104. Fathers, 1 January 2009. ISBN 9781905881048
105. Lost and Found, 27 March 2009, ISBN 9781905881055
106. New Fiction Special, May 2009, ISBN 9781905881062
107. Summer Reading, June 2009, ISBN 9781929001361
108. Chicago, September 2009, ISBN 9781905881123

=== 2010–2019 ===
109. Work, January 2010, ISBN 9781929001392
110. Sex, February 2010, ISBN 9781929001408
111. Going Back, March 2010, ISBN 9781905881192
112. Pakistan, Autumn 2010, ISBN 9781905881215
113. The Best of Young Spanish Language Novelists, January 2011, ISBN 9781905881239
114. Aliens, February 2011, ISBN 9781905881338
115. The F Word, May 2011, ISBN 9781905881345
116. Ten Years Later, August 2011, ISBN 9781905881352
117. Horror, Autumn 2011, ISBN 9781905881369
118. Exit Strategies, Winter 2012, ISBN 9781905881550
119. Britain, Spring 2012, ISBN 9781905881567
120. Medicine, Summer 2012, ISBN 9781905881611
121. The Best of Young Brazilian Novelists, Autumn 2012, ISBN 9781905881635
122. Betrayal, Winter 2013, ISBN 9781905881659
123. Best of Young British Novelists 4, Spring 2013, ISBN 9781905881673
124. Travel, Summer 2013, ISBN 9781905881697
125. After the War, Autumn 2013, ISBN 9781905881710
126. Do You Remember, Winter 2014, ISBN 9781905881796
127. Japan, Spring 2014, ISBN 9781905881772
128. American Wild, Summer 2014, ISBN 9781905881819
129. Fate, Autumn 2014, ISBN 9781905881833
130. India, Winter 2015, ISBN 9781905881857
131. The Map Is Not The Territory, Spring 2015, ISBN 9781905881871
132. Possession, Summer 2015, ISBN 9781905881895
133. What Have We Done, Autumn 2015, ISBN 9781905881918
134. No Man's Land, Winter 2016, ISBN 9781905881932
135. New Irish Writing, Spring 2016, ISBN 9781905881956
136. Legacies of Love, Summer 2016, ISBN 9781905881970
137. (untitled), Autumn 2016, ISBN 9781905881994
138. Journeys, Winter 2017, ISBN 9781909889033
139. Best of Young American Novelists 3, Spring 2017, ISBN 9781909889064
140. State of Mind, Summer 2017, ISBN 9781909889088
141. Canada, Autumn 2017, ISBN 9781909889101
142. Animalia, Winter 2018, ISBN 9781909889125
143. After The Fact, Spring 2018, ISBN 9781909889163
144. Generic Love Story, Summer 2018, ISBN 9781909889170
145. Ghosts, Autumn 2018, ISBN 9781909889194
146. The Politics of Feeling, Winter 2019, ISBN 9781909889217
147. 40th-Birthday Special, Spring 2019, ISBN 9781909889224
148. Summer Fiction, Summer 2019, ISBN 978-1909889255
149. Europe: Strangers in the Land, Autumn 2019, ISBN 9781909889286

=== 2020–present ===
150. There Must Be Ways to Organise the World with Language, Winter 2020, ISBN 9781909889309
151. Membranes, Spring 2020, ISBN 9781909889323
152. Still Life, Summer 2020, ISBN 9781909889347
153. Second Nature, Autumn 2020, ISBN 9781909889361
154. I’ve Been Away for a While, Winter 2021, ISBN 9781909889378
155. Best of Young Spanish-Language Novelists 2, Spring 2021, ISBN 9781909889392
156. Interiors, Summer 2021, ISBN 9781909889415
157. Should We Have Stayed at Home? New Travel Writing, Autumn 2021, ISBN 9781909889439
158. In the Family, Winter 2021, ISBN 9781909889453
159. What Do You See?, Spring 2022, ISBN 9781909889477
160. Conflict, Summer 2022, ISBN 9781909889491
161. Sister, Brother, Autumn 2022, ISBN 9781909889514
162. Definitive Narratives of Escape, Winter 2022, ISBN 9781909889538
163. Best of Young British Novelists 5, Spring 2023, ISBN 9781909889552
164. Last Notes, Summer 2023, ISBN 9781909889576
165. Deutschland, Autumn 2023, ISBN 9781909889590
166. Generations, Winter 2023, ISBN 9781909889620
167. Extraction, Spring 2024, ISBN 9781909889644
168. Significant Other, Summer 2024, ISBN 9781909889668
169. China, Autumn 2024, ISBN 9781909889682
170. Winners, Winter 2024, ISBN 9781909889705
171. Dead Friends, Spring 2025, ISBN 9781909889729
172. Badlands, Summer 2025, ISBN 9781909889743
173. India, Autumn 2025, ISBN 9781909889767
