= Catch the Rabbit (novel) =

2018 novel

- Serbo-Croatian original edition, Uhvati zeca (2018)
- Author: Lana Bastašić
- Original title: Uhvati zeca
- Language: Serbo-Croatian
- Publisher: Kontrast
- Publication date: 1 September 2018
- ISBN: 978-8-689-20391-2

Catch the Rabbit (Serbo-Croatian: Uhvati zeca / Ухвати зеца) is the debut novel by the Bosnian author Lana Bastašić, originally published in Serbo-Croatian in 2018. It was a laureate of the European Union Prize for Literature in 2020. It was turned into a play by the Sarajevo National Theatre in 2024.

== Plot ==
The novel alternates between two timeframes: the present day and flashbacks to Sara and Lejla's childhood in Banja Luka during the Bosnian War.

Sara, a Bosnian émigré now living in Dublin with her Irish boyfriend Michael, receives an unexpected phone call from Lejla, her childhood best friend with whom she has had no contact for twelve years. Lejla, calling from Mostar, tells Sara that her brother Armin—who disappeared during the war and was presumed dead—is alive and in Vienna. Sara immediately books a flight to Bosnia.

In flashbacks, the novel traces their friendship from age seven. Sara grew up in a Serbian family; her father served as a police chief. Lejla's family was Bosniak Muslim, making them targets of discrimination and violence as ethnic tensions rose. When Lejla was eleven, her mother changed their surname from Begić to the Serbian-sounding Berić and shortened Lejla's name to Lela to conceal their Muslim identity. Sara was secretly attracted to Armin, who introduced her to literature through his copy of Treasure Island. Armin disappeared after being falsely accused of poisoning neighbourhood dogs—one of many incidents of anti-Muslim persecution in their town, including the murder of a Bosniak teenager found in the river.

The women's friendship was intense but unequal. Sara consistently felt inferior to the charismatic, unpredictable Lejla. They lost touch during university after Lejla inexplicably cut Sara off, only to reappear years later when her pet rabbit died.

The road trip from Bosnia to Vienna is tense, filled with arguments and conflicting memories. The women stop in Jajce, visiting catacombs and the AVNOJ museum. As they travel, Sara reconstructs their shared past in her narration, but Lejla's different recollections of key events—including the night they both lost their virginity at prom—call the reliability of Sara's account into question.

== Reception ==
Irina Dumitrescu of the Los Angeles Review of Books called Catch the Rabbit "[a] funny, fast, and gripping novel filled with observations of Bosnian society that are both tender and incisive." Cory Oldweiler of the Minnesota Star Tribune said that it is "[a] rich, rewarding debut novel".
