= Sonia Hernández =

Spanish journalist, writer and poet

Sònia Hernández (born 1976) is a Spanish writer. She was born in Tarrasa in the province of Barcelona. She published her first book of poems La casa del mar in 2006, followed by Los nombres del tiempo in 2010. Her fiction includes the short story collections Los enfermos erróneos (2008) and La propagación del silencio (2013) as well as the novels La mujer de Rapallo in 2010 and Los Pissimboni in 2015.

A member of the Grupo de Estudios del Exilio Literario (GEXEL), she has conducted research on Max Aub and Vicente Rojo. She has also written literary criticism for La Vanguardia. She is the coordinator of the literary research magazine Quaderns de Vallençana, dedicated to the humanist Juan Ramón Masoliver. Michael Ende is among her favourite writers.

In 2010, she was named by Granta magazine as one of the best young writers in the Spanish language.
