= Yara Rodrigues Fowler =

British novelist

- Born: 33–34; Balham, South London
- Education: Graveney School; University of Oxford; University College London
- Occupation: Author
- Writing career
- Language: English, Portuguese
- Genre: Fiction
- Notable works: Stubborn Archivist (2019), there are more things (2022)

Yara Rodrigues Fowler is a British novelist of Brazilian origin. She was nominated for the Sunday Times Young Writer of the Year award, and she was also named by the Financial Times as one of the "most exciting young people”. In 2023, she was named by Granta Magazine in their decennial list of best young British novelists.

A Londoner by upbringing, she made her literary debut with the novel Stubborn Archivist in 2019, a novel she describes as "realist" and "natural ... [since it reflects] everyday life".

== Career ==
=== Stubborn Archivist (2019) ===
Her first novel, Stubborn Archivist, was published in 2019. It was longlisted for the Dylan Thomas Prize (2020) and the Desmond Elliott Prize (2019) Yara was named one of The Observer’s ‘hottest-tipped’ debut novelists of 2019 and was shortlisted for the Sunday Times Young Writer of the Year 2019.

=== there are more things (2022) ===
Her latest novel there are more things was published in 2022. It was nominated for the Goldsmiths Prize and the Orwell Prize for Fiction, and it was also a Sunday Times Fiction Book of the Year.

=== Other works ===
Rodrigues Fowler is currently co-writing a play called The Conference of the Trees with Majid Adin and Connie Treves, based on the poems by members of the Change The Word poetry collective at Good Chance Theatre. The Conference of the Trees was selected for the Writers' Guild of Great Britain's inaugural New Play Commission Scheme.

Her next book, a work currently in progress, will be a literary account of the life of Princess Diana through a formally experimental Marxist, feminist, and anti-imperialist lens.

== Personal life and political views ==
Rodrigues Fowler grew up in Balham, South London. She was born in 1992 to a Brazilian mother and a British father. She was state educated at Graveney School in Tooting, has an BA in English from Wadham College, University of Oxford and an MA from University College London.

She is a part-time climate justice organiser and serves as a trustee of Latin American Women’s Aid. As a political activist, she also worked on boosting youth turnout in the 2017 UK general election. She has written about her support for Lula, stating that his election 'victory has made me feel freedom is possible.'
