= Miluska Benavides =

Peruvian writer and translator

- Born: 1986 (age 38–39); Lima, Peru
- Occupation: Writer, translator, professor
- Education: University of Colorado Boulder
- Employer: Peruvian University of Applied Sciences

Miluska Benavides (born 1986) is a Peruvian writer and translator. She was born in Lima. She has a doctorate in Latin American literature from the University of Colorado Boulder and currently teaches at the Peruvian University of Applied Sciences. She is known for her prose works, among them:

- Naturaleza de la prosa de José María Eguren (essay, Academia Peruana de la Lengua, 2017)
- La caza espiritual (short stories, Celacanto, 2015).

In 2012, she also translated Arthur Rimbaud’s poetical work A Season in Hell.

In 2021, she was named by Granta magazine as one of the best young writers in the Spanish language.

In 2022, she was working on her novel Hechos.
