= Jennifer Atkins =

British writer

Jennifer Atkins is a British writer. She was born in London. Her previous occupations include bookseller and script reader.

Atkins published her debut novel The Cellist in 2022. Her work has appeared in The White Review, and she has written for The World of Interiors. In 2023, she was named by Granta magazine as one of the best young writers in the UK.
