= David Haynes (novelist) =

American novelist

David Haynes is an American novelist. He has written over a dozen books for adults and children. He teaches at Southern Methodist University in Dallas. In 1996, he was chosen as one of the best young American novelists by Granta magazine.

== Bibliography ==
- Right By My Side (1993) (New Rivers Press)
- Somebody Else's Mama (1995) (Milkweed Editions)
- All American Dream Dolls (Milkweed Editions), 1998 Minnesota Book Awards nominee
- Welcome to Your World: Writings for the Heart of Young America (with Julie Landsman) (Milkweed Editions)
- The Everyday Magic of Walterlee Higgins (Minnesota Center for Book Arts 1998 Winter Book Project), 1999 Minnesota Book Awards nominee
- The Full Matilda (2004)
- A Star in the Face of the Sky (2013)
