= Aura García-Junco =

Mexican writer (born 1988)

- Born: 1988 (age 37–38); Mexico City, Mexico
- Education: National Autonomous University of Mexico
- Occupation: Writer

Aura García-Junco (born 1988) is a Mexican writer. She was born in Mexico City and studied literature at UNAM. Her debut novel Anticitera, artefacto dentado appeared in 2019. This was followed by El día que aprendí que no sé amar, a book of essays, in 2021, a second novel, Mar de piedra, in 2022, and a third novel, Dios fulmine a a la que escriba sobre mí, in 2023.

She has been a fellow of the Foundation for Mexican Literature (2016) and the FONCA Young Artists programme (2014, 2017 and 2021). In 2021, she was named by Granta magazine as one of the best young writers in the Spanish language.
