= Andrea Chapela =

Mexican writer (born 1990)

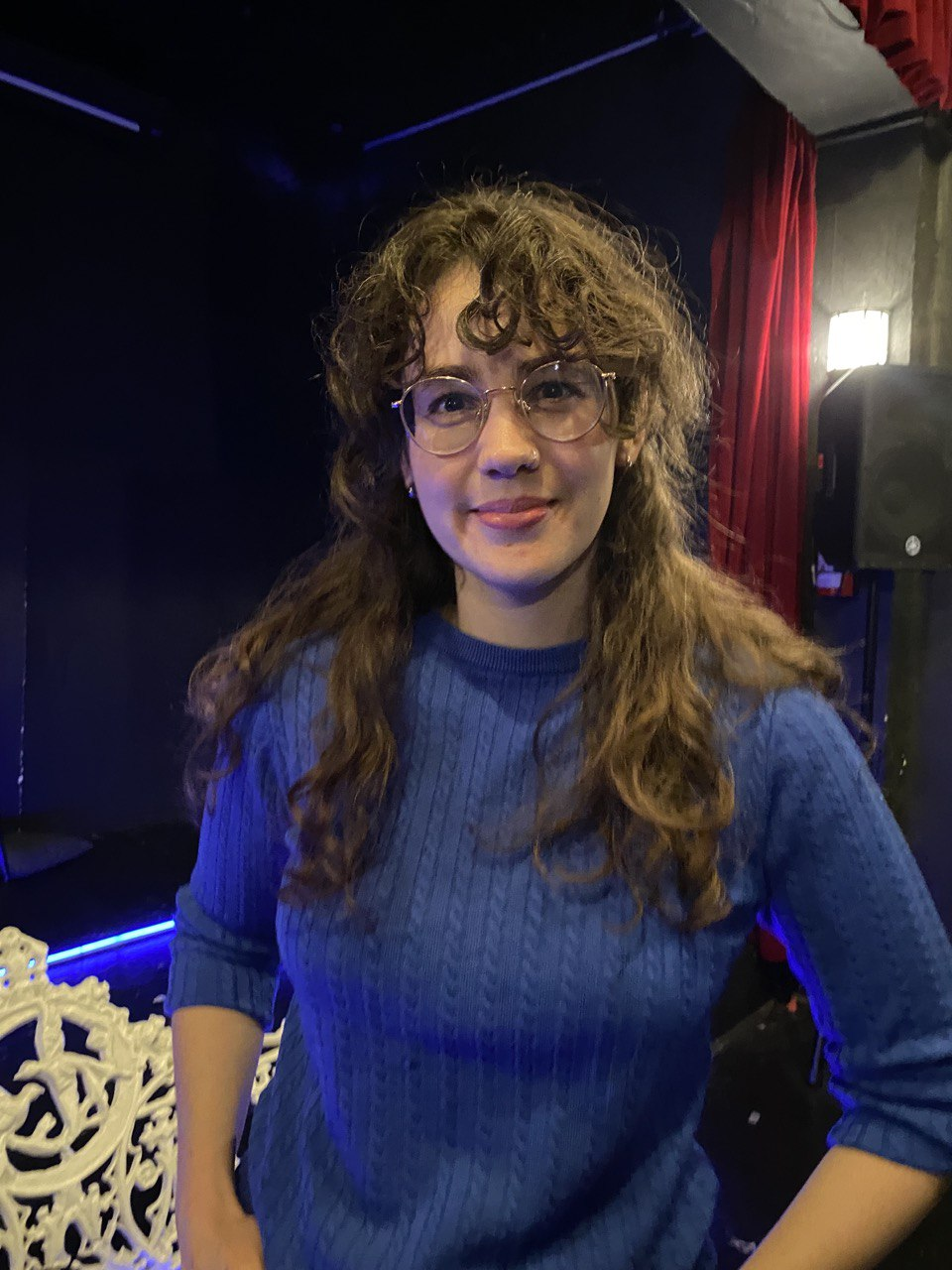
- Born: Mexico City
- Writing career
- Language: Spanish English

Andrea Chapela (born 1990) is a Mexican writer. She was born in Mexico City. She studied chemistry at UNAM and has a MFA in Creative Writing from the University of Iowa. She is also an alumna of the Clarion West Writers Workshop for fantasy and science fiction, class of 2017. She lived for two years in the Residencia de Estudiantes in Madrid, where she was given a grant to work on an essay collection, and has been a FONCA scholar twice (2016-2017 for stories and 2019-2020 for novels).

She is the author of several books in Spanish, among them the young adult tetralogy Vâudïz, the essay collection Grados de miopía and the story collections Un año de servicio a la habitación and Ansibles, perfiladores y otras máquinas de ingenio. Some of her work has been translated into English, including the book The Visible Unseen, a translation by Kelsi Vanada of Chapela's 2019 book Grados de miopía.

== Science Fiction and Fantasy ==
The four books of Chapela's YA fantasy tetralogy Vâudïz (La heredera, El creador, La cuentista and El cuento) were published between 2009 and 2015 by the publishing house Urano. In 2016, Chapela was awarded a Jóvenes Creadores grant for a science fiction short story collection. Some of these stories have been published in Samovar, Tierra Adentro, and Alucinadas IV, a Spanish anthology.

The short story collection Un año de servicio a la habitación was published by UDG in 2019, and won the National Juan José Arreola Literature Prize.

In that same year, Chapela received the Gilberto Owen National Prize for Literature in Mexico for the short story collection Ansibles, perfiladores y otras máquinas de ingenio. The book was published by Almadía in 2020. According to Indent Literary Agency, "These ten stories take place in futures where a collection of devices like pings, ansibles, lenses, profilers, or sensory curtains—some of these installed within the human body—allow people to link their minds in a digital cloud, share their thoughts and memories, filter their perceptions, or calculate the success of a romance while they eat basket tacos or navigate the streets of a Mexico City that is completely covered by water. With devastating intelligence, Andrea Chapela confronts her protagonists with realities where scientific knowledge, cutting-edge technology, and daily life interact in ways that are increasingly intricate and inevitable, so that even in the privacy of their minds, the voice of their own conscience no longer reigns."

== Nonfiction ==
Chapela regularly contributes to literary magazines like Principia Magazine, Este País, Literal Magazine, Vaso Cósmico, and Tierra Adentro.

Her essay collection Grados de miopía [The Visible Unseen] won the José Luis Martínez National Prize in Mexico for essays by young writers. The book is a lyrical essay, published by Tierra Adentro in fall 2019. Luis Jorge Boone of Tierra Adentro says of the collection: "[Chapela's] method is exchanging lyrical doubt with personal experimentation, allowing knowledge to become a metaphor and everyday experiences to mark the course of curiosity.”

== Publication in English Translation ==
In 2022, Restless Books published The Visible Unseen, an English translation by Kelsi Vanada of Chapela's essay collection Grados de miopía. The book received a starred review from Kirkus, which summarized it as "philosophical meditations graced by radiant prose." Terrance Hayes called it "a lyrical laboratory of thinking and feeling. It’s an uncanny memoir of inner and outer perceptions" while literary translator Julia Sanches wrote: “A gimlet-eyed meditation on the dovetailing of science, the self, and written expression, The Visible Unseen jolted me. Andrea Chapela is an exquisite new voice in the hands of a superlative translator.”

Some of the poems from Chapela's MFA thesis have been translated into English and published in the Brooklyn Rail InTranslation, and selections of her nonfiction and science fiction have also been published in English translation, including the short story "The Person You are Trying to Reach is Not Available." The first essay in her nonfiction collection Grados de miopía was published in English translation in the journal Tupelo Quarterly. Her short story "Borromean Rings" was translated by Kelsi Vanada and published in Granta.

== Honors and awards ==
Chapela has received several prizes, among them the National Gilberto Owen Literature Prize for Stories in 2018, the National Juan José Arreola Literature Prize in 2019, and the National Joven José Luis Martínez Essay Prize in 2019. In 2021, she was named by Granta magazine as one of the best young Spanish-language novelists.

== Works ==
- La heredera (Book 1 of the tetralogy Vâudïz), 2008
- El creador (Book 2 of the tetralogy Vâudïz), 2009
- La cuentista (Book 3 of the tetralogy Vâudïz), 2012
- El cuento (Book 4 of the tetralogy Vâudïz), 2015
- Un año de servicio a la habitación, 2019
- Grados de miopía, 2019
- Ansibles, perfiladores y otras máquinas de ingenio, 2020
- The Visible Unseen, tr. Kelsi Vanada, 2022 (English translation of Grados de miopía)
