= Leandro Sarmatz =

Brazilian writer and journalist

Leandro Sarmatz is a Brazilian writer and journalist. He was born in Porto Alegre and now lives in São Paulo. He studied at PUC-RS. Sarmatz was an editor at the publishing house Companhia das Letras, leaving it in 2016 to establish a new publishing house, Todavia. He is also a columnist and journalist for a number of Brazilian media outlets.

He is the author of the play Mães e sogras (2000), the poetry collection Logocausto (2009) and the short story collection Uma fome (2010). He was named by Granta magazine as one of the best young writers in Brazil.
