= Grace Talusan =

American writer

Grace Talusan is a Filipino American writer. Her 2019 memoir, The Body Papers, won the Restless Books Prize for New Immigrant Writing and the Massachusetts Book Award in nonfiction and was a New York Times Editors' Choice selection. Her short story, "The Book of Life and Death," was the Boston Book Festival's One City One Story selection in 2020.

Talusan was born in the Philippines, and during the 1970s, her parents came to Chicago from Manila, as her father, Totoy, finished his medical studies on a student visa, and then they settled in Boston, Massachusetts, when she was 2. Upon expiration of her father's student visa, the family, including Grace and her two brothers, all U.S.-born, were undocumented. She graduated from Tufts University and holds an MFA in Creative Writing from UC Irvine. Her work often explores immigration, trauma, memory, and belonging.She was the Fannie Hurst Writer in Residence at Brandeis University and is currently a lecturer in the Nonfiction Writing Program at Brown University.

== Reception ==
In a New York Times review, Jennifer Szalai wrote that The Body Papers "doesn’t track a one-way march to triumph from adversity; Talusan’s essays loop in on themselves, as she retrieves old memories and finds unexpected points of connection."

Kirkus Reviews said of The Body Papers, "Moving and eloquent, Talusan’s book is a testament not only to one woman’s fierce will to live, but also to the healing power of speaking the unspeakable. A candidly courageous memoir."

In a review in NYLON, Ilana Masad calls the memoir "stunning" and writes, "Grace Talusan is honest and elegant about some of life's most difficult moments."

Profiles in Carve Magazine and Literary Boston highlight Talusan’s impact as a Filipino American voice in contemporary literature.

== Works ==
=== Books ===
- The Body Papers (Restless Books, 2019)

=== Anthologies ===
- Alone Together: Love, Grief, and Comfort in the Time of COVID-19 (2020)
- And We Came Outside and Saw the Stars Again (2020)

=== Short stories ===
“The Book of Life and Death” (2020) - selected for the Boston Book Festival’s One City One Story program. Archived 2021-05-26 at the Wayback Machine.
