= Eudris Planche Savón =

Cuban writer and doctor

Eudris Planche Savón is a Cuban writer and doctor. He was born in Guantánamo in 1985.

His first novel HERMANAS DE INTERCAMBIO (Cuba, 2016; Argentina, 2019) was praised by critics and won several prizes, among them:

- Premio Nacional Pinos Nuevos 2015,
- Premio Mundial a la Excelencia Literaria 2019–2020 awarded by the Unión Hispanomundial de Escritores (UHE); World Nations Writer's Union (Kazakhstan), Motivational Strips (Sultanato de Omán), Municipalidad Provincial de Urubamba, Cusco–Perú.

He has since published a book of short stories: CERO CUENTOS (Ediciones del Genal, España, 2020).

Other recognition of his work includes

- Premio de Poesía del Concurso Internacional Temirqazyq 2019 (World Nations Writer´s Union);
- Finalist for the Premio Casa de las Américas, in 2019
- Mención Premio Nacional David 2013
- Mención Premio Nacional Abril 2015
- Finalist for the Premio de Narrativa Breve Eduardo Kovalivker 2015
- Finalist for the Premio Nacional Casa Tomada 2009;
- Special recognition at the Premio Nacional Cesar Galeano 2009.

In 2021, he was named by Granta magazine as one of the best young writers in the Spanish language.

His work has appeared in various publications in Argentina, Chile, Cuba, Spain, Italia, México, United States, and United Kingdom (London). His work has been translated into English and Italian, among other languages. He has appeared in various workshops and festivals in Argentina, Cuba, Uruguay, Chile, etc.
