= Dainerys Machado Vento =

Cuban writer and scholar

Dainerys Machado Vento is a Cuban writer and scholar. She was born in Havana in 1986. She studied journalism at the Universidad de La Habana, followed by doctoral studies in Modern Languages and Literature at the University of Miami.

She is the author of Las noventa Habanas (short stories, 2019) and Retratos de la orilla (short stories, 2022). Her stories have been anthologized in Mexico and the United States, and her journalistic work has appeared in outlets such as Cuadernos Americanos, Hemisférica y Decimonónica, Revista Horizontum and La Gaceta de Cuba. She won the 2016 State of San Luis Potosí Prize for Journalism. In 2021 she was named by Granta magazine as one of the best young writers in the Spanish language.

She studied literature at the Colegio de San Luis A.C. in Mexico, and co-founded the publishing house Sualos/Swallows.
