= Matías Néspolo =

Argentine writer and journalist

Matías Néspolo (born 1975) is an Argentine writer and journalist. He was born in Buenos Aires, and studied literature at university. He wrote and published in a variety of genres: poetry, essays, novels, short stories, etc. In 2005, he published the poetry collection Anthología seca de Green Hills. In 2009, he edited an anthology with his sister, the writer Jimena Néspolo, titled La erotica de relato: Escritores de la nueva literatura argentina. That same year, he published his first novel, Siete maneras de matar a un gato, which was translated into English by Frank Wynne and published under the title Seven Ways to Kill a Cat (2011). Set in the poor parts of Buenos Aires, the book makes extensive use of lunfardo, the distinctive porteño slang of the city.

In 2010, he was selected by Granta as one of their best young contemporary writers in the Spanish language.

He lives in Barcelona, with his wife and three daughters.
