= Restless Books =

Independent, non-profit American book publisher

- Founded: 2013
- Founder: Ilan Stavans, Annette Hochstein, Joshua Ellison
- Country of origin: United States
- Headquarters location: Amherst, Massachusetts
- Distribution: Publishers Group West
- Imprints: Yonder
- Official website: www.restlessbooks.org

Restless Books is an independent, non-profit publisher located in Amherst, Massachusetts. It was founded in 2013 and was based in Brooklyn, New York until 2023. Restless publishes "international works of fiction, journalism, memoirs, travel writing, and illustrated books." The press published 15-20 titles a year, including authors Ruth Ozeki, Lana Bastašić, Yishai Sarid, Andrea Chapela, Tash Aw, Chris Abani, Gabriela Wiener, and Giacomo Sartori. It includes the Yonder imprint for younger readers.

== History ==
Restless Books was founded in 2013 by Ilan Stavans, Annette Hochstein, and Joshua Ellison as an international press.

== Restless Books Prize for New Immigrant Writing ==
Restless inaugurated the annual $10,000 Prize for New Immigrant Writing in 2016. The prize comes with a publication deal.

=== Winners of the New Immigrant Writing Prize ===
- 2016: Deepak Unnikrishnan for Temporary People
- 2017: Grace Talusan for The Body Papers
- 2018: Priyanka A. Champaneri for The City of Good Death
- 2019: Rajiv Mohabir for Antiman: A Hybrid Memoir
- 2020: Meron Hadero for A Down Home Meal for These Difficult Times
- 2021: Ani Gjika for By Its Right Name
- 2022: Praveen Herat for Between This World and the Next
- 2023: Catharina Coenen for Unexploded Ordnance
- 2024: Sofi Stambo for A Bunch of Savages
