= Aniela Steinsbergowa =

Polish lawyer

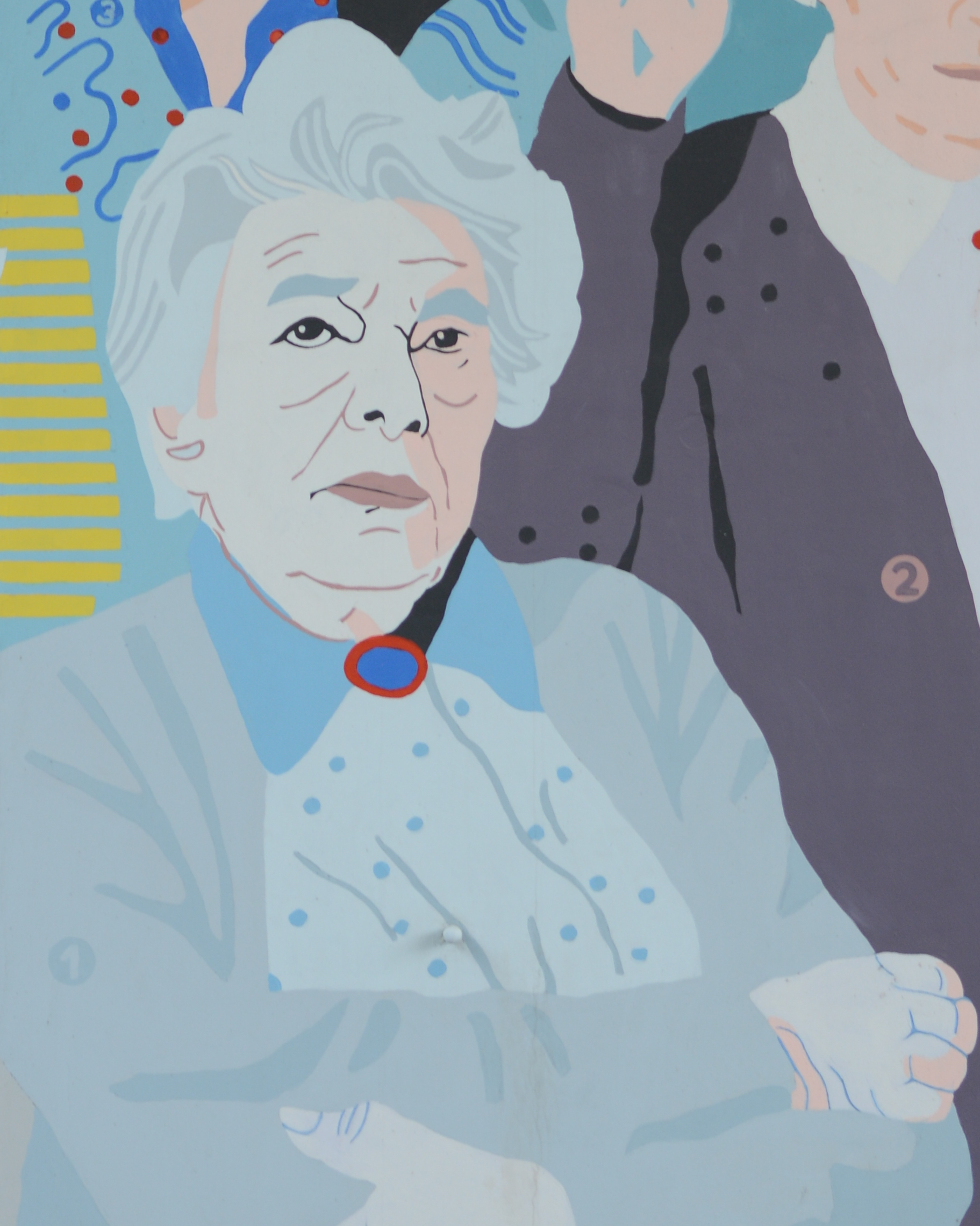
- Portrait of Steinsbergowa from a mural under Gdańsk Strzyża railway station
- Born: July 27, 1896. Vienna, Austria-Hungary
- Died: December 22, 1988 (aged 92); Warsaw, Warsaw Voivodeship, Polish People's Republic
- Resting place: Evangelical Reformed Cemetery
- Organizations: Żegota; Crooked Circle Club
- Notable work: Polish translation of Tristes Tropiques

Aniela Zofia Steinsbergowa (born on 27 June 1896 in Vienna; died on 22 December 1988 in Warsaw) was a Polish lawyer known for her work in defending politically well-known cases.

In 1931, she was entered on the list of lawyers, which made her one of the first female lawyers in Poland. In 1934 she joined the Polish Socialist Party. During WWII she was active in the Żegota. After the war she became a co-founder of the Workers' Defense Committee and the Social Self-Defense Committee "KOR".
