= Bill Buford =

American author (born 1954)

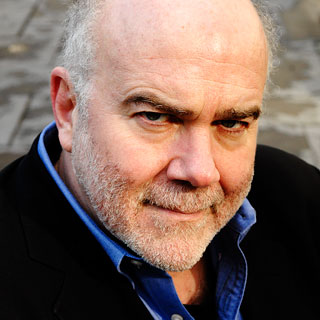
- Born: 6 October 1954 (age 71); Baton Rouge, Louisiana, U.S.
- Education: University of California, Berkeley; King's College, Cambridge
- Occupations: Author, journalist
- Writing career
- Notable works: Among the Thugs (1990); Heat (2006); Dirt: (2020)
- Literary movement: Dirty realism

William Holmes Buford (born 6 October 1954) is an American author and journalist. He is the author of the books Among the Thugs and Heat: An Amateur's Adventures as Kitchen Slave, Line Cook, Pasta-Maker, and Apprentice to a Dante-Quoting Butcher in Tuscany. Buford was previously the fiction editor for The New Yorker, where he is still on staff. For sixteen years, he was the editor of Granta, which he relaunched in 1979. He is also credited with coining the term "dirty realism."

== Early years ==
Buford was born in Baton Rouge, Louisiana, and raised in Southern California, attending the University of California, Berkeley, from 1973 to 1977. He then received a Marshall Scholarship to read English at King's College, Cambridge, where he graduated with a BA in 1979. He remained in England for most of the 1980s.

== Work ==
=== As an author ===
Among the Thugs (1990) is presented as an insider's account of the world of (primarily) English football hooliganism.

Heat (2006) is Buford's account of working for free in the kitchen of Babbo, a New York City restaurant owned by chef Mario Batali. Buford's premise is that he considered himself a capable home cook and wondered whether he had the skills to work in a busy restaurant kitchen. He met Batali at a dinner party and asked whether he would take on Buford as his "kitchen bitch".

Buford began his time at Babbo in a variety of roles including dishwasher, prep cook, garbage remover and any other role demanded of him. Over the course of the book, his skills improve and he is able to butcher a hog and work many stations in the restaurant; he traveled to Italy to meet cooks and chefs who were crucial to Batali's early culinary development, as Buford worked and lived in some of the places Batali had trained.

Subsequently, Buford started working on a book on French cuisine. In October 2007, his article titled "Extreme Chocolate: The Quest for the Perfect Bean" was published in The New Yorker.

Buford's article "Cooking with Daniel: Three French Classics", about his experience cooking with French chef Daniel Boulud, was published in the July 29, 2013, issue of The New Yorker. In an interview posted on The New Yorker's website to accompany the article, he discussed his time living in France and what he had learned about French cooking. The book-length treatment of Buford's time in Lyon, France, from December 2008 to September 2013, appeared in 2020 as Dirt: Adventures in Lyon as a Chef in Training, Father, and Sleuth Looking for the Secret of French Cooking. It details stints working with "Bob", baker at the boulangerie Philippe Richard, attending classes at the Institut Paul Bocuse, and, at greatest length, as a stagiaire at La Mère Brazier.

Salman Rushdie's novel The Enchantress of Florence (2008) is dedicated "to Bill Buford".

=== As an editor ===
Bill Buford, editor, with Granta, between 1979 and 1985, by Bernard Gotfryd

Buford relaunched the then-defunct literary magazine Granta in 1979. Under his leadership, that journal became highly influential and "rose to conquer the literary world." He edited it until 1995, when he left to become the fiction editor of The New Yorker. In 2002, The New Yorker announced that Buford would leave the latter position at the beginning of 2003, to be replaced by Deborah Treisman, his deputy, whom he had recruited to the magazine. He remains on its staff.

== Personal life ==
Buford is married to Jessica Green. They have twin sons.

== Bibliography ==
=== Books ===
- Buford, Bill (1990). Among the Thugs.
- — (2006). Heat: An Amateur's Adventures as Kitchen Slave, Line Cook, Pasta-Maker, and Apprentice to a Dante-Quoting Butcher in Tuscany. New York: Knopf. ISBN 978-1400041206.
- — (2020). Dirt: Adventures in Lyon as a Chef in Training, Father, and Sleuth Looking for the Secret of French Cooking. Knopf.

=== Essays and reporting ===
- Buford, Bill (January 5, 1998). "Thy Neighbor's Wife: Why Are Telescopes So Popular?". The New Yorker. Vol. 73, no. 41. pp. 36–37.
- Buford, Bill (April 26, 1999). "Sweat is Good". The New Yorker. Vol. 75, no. 9. pp. 130–139.
- Buford, Bill (October 29, 2007). "Extreme Chocolate: The Quest for the Perfect Bean". The New Yorker. Vol. 83, no. 33. pp. 68–79.
- Buford, Bill (July 29, 2013). "Cooking with Daniel". The New Yorker. Vol. 89, no. 22. pp. 46–55.
- Buford, Bill (May 4, 2015). "Four Little Pigs". The Talk of the Town. Dept. of Gastronomy. The New Yorker. Vol. 91, no. 11. p. 19.
- Buford, Bill (October 12, 2015). "The Presidential Clean-Plate Club". The New Yorker. Vol. 91, no. 31. pp. 36–38.
- Buford, Bill (January 23, 2018). "The First Time I Met Paul Bocuse". The New Yorker.
- Buford, Bill (April 6, 2020). "Baking Bread in Lyon". The New Yorker. Vol. 96, no. 8. pp. 26–33.

Media offices
| Preceded by (unknown) | Editor of Granta; 1979–1995 | Succeeded by Ian Jack |
