= Natalie Dybisz =

British photographer

- Born: 1986 (age 38–39); Leeds, West Yorkshire, England
- Education: University of Sussex
- Known for: Fine-art fashion photography
- Notable work: Surreal Fashion
- Style: Surrealism, baroque
- Spouse: Matthew Lennard
- Website: Official website

Natalie Aniela Dybisz (born 1986), known professionally as Miss Aniela, is a British fine-art fashion and surrealist photographer. Selvedge describes her work as a "fus[ion of] traditional photography with digitally enhanced motifs and surrealism."

== Early life ==
Dybisz was born in 1986 in Leeds, West Yorkshire, England. A self-taught photographer, she began taking self-portraits at 15 but began focusing on it at 21 while studying English and Media at the University of Sussex.

Dybisz started posting her self-portraits on Flickr in April 2006 and quickly garnered online popularity. After leaving university, she assumed she wouldn't be able to commit fully or professionally to photography for another year or two at least. Five months later, however, she was contacted by Microsoft and asked to speak at their Pro Photo Summit in Seattle about digital photography. At this point, she decided to quit her job to pursue photography full-time.

== Photography ==
Dybisz utilizes models and practical effects in the first part of her process, then does digital post-production using Photoshop. She is inspired by her environment, dreams, experiences, literature, and fine art, particularly 16th-century chiaroscuro artists, such as Caravaggio. She has shot in mansion, castles, and stately homes in France and England, such as Château de Champlâtreux, and in other locations such as abandoned buildings. Normal Magazine described her work as "combin[ing] baroque aesthetics and the directives of commercial work."

Dybisz and her husband Matthew host the Fashion Shoot Experience, a workshop held in interesting shooting locations in London, Los Angeles, New York, Iceland, and other countries in Europe. In 2010 and 2017, Dybisz was named "One to Watch" by the Saatchi Gallery in London. She also teaches courses on photography and photoshop. She has been featured in El País, NY Arts, Plastik Magazine, TechMag, American Photo, Playboy Spain, ALARM Magazine, and Vogue Italia. Exhibition locations include Saatchi Gallery, Houses of Parliament, Waldemarsudde, and Vouge Italia's space in Milan. Kai Mayfair and Hôtel de Crillon have also displayed her work.

Dybisz's first professional exhibition was "locally in Brighton" while her Self-Gazing series of self-portraits were the first to be invited internationally. The Ecology series was one of her earlier collections and showed the "relationship between humans and nature through visual references to pollution, deforestation and climate engineering." In 2011, she started Surreal Fashion, which icanbecreative.com described as "where fashion meets fine art, beauty meets absurdity, and couture meets chaos." In 2014, she did a fantasy photoshoot for Nikon and released her Faces collection, which "merg[es] large-scale faces with hundreds of paintings from art history." In 2017, she worked both on Barocco, a collection inspired by the Baroque and Rococo eras, and Birth Undisturbed, a series about childbirth as an empowering experience for women worldwide.

She has published two books:

- 2011: Self-portrait Photography: The Ultimate in Personal Expression - Ilex Press, Ltd., ISBN 9781907579165
- 2012: Creative Portrait Photography - Octopus Books, ISBN 9781781570142

== Personal life ==
Dybisz's husband Matthew Lennard works with her under the Miss Aniela name. The stillborn birth of their son Evan in 2013 inspired and informed her Birth Undisturbed series. They also have a daughter, born 2014/2015.
