= Aniela Tułodziecka =

Polish educational activist

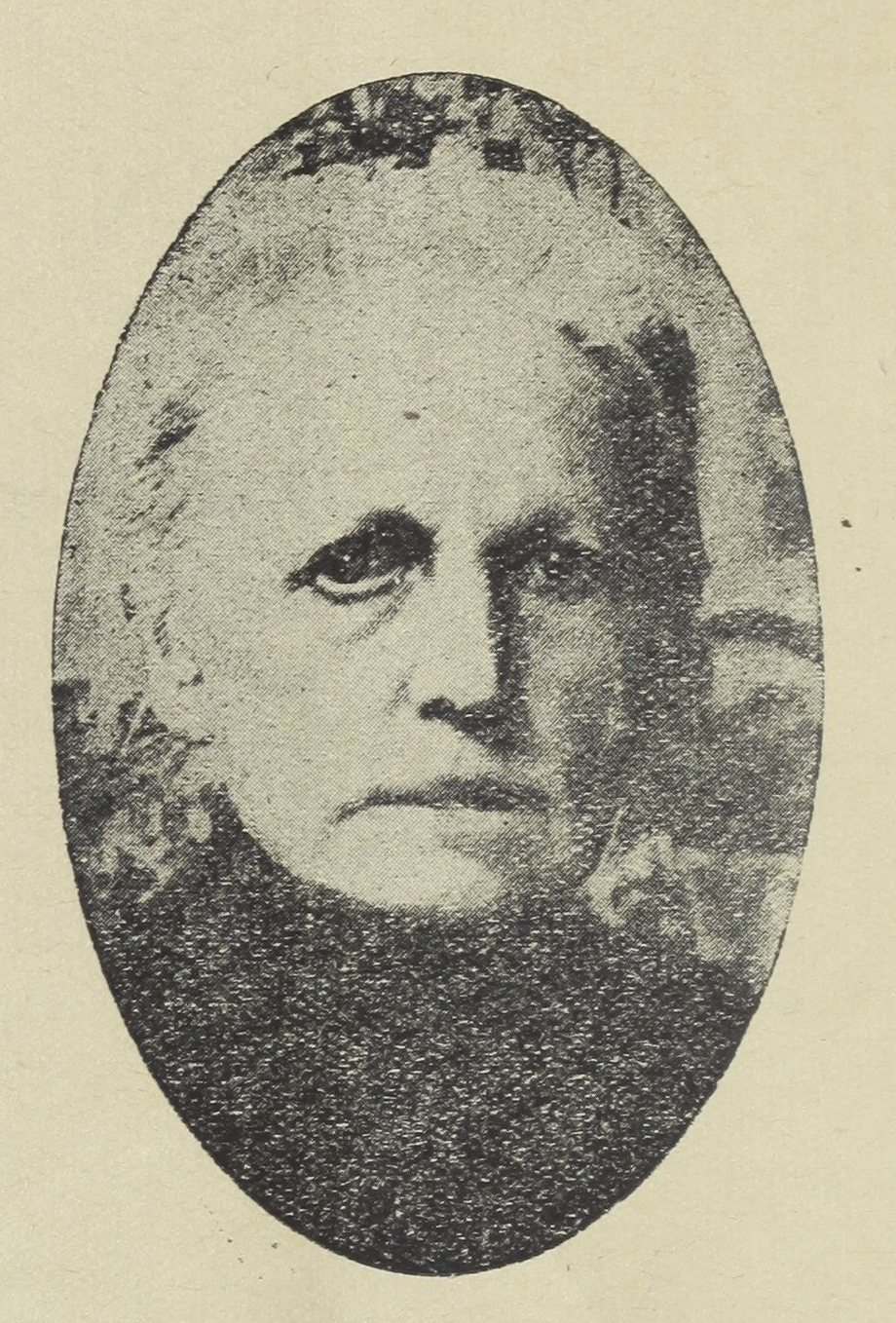
Aniela Tułodziecka

Aniela Tułodziecka (2 October 1853 in Dąbrowa Stara, Kingdom of Prussia - 11 October 1932 in Poznań) was a Polish educational activist of the Warta Society (Towarzystwo Przyjaciół Wzajemnego Pouczania się i Opieki nad Dziećmi Warta).
