= Aniela Rodríguez =

Mexican poet & writer (born 1992)

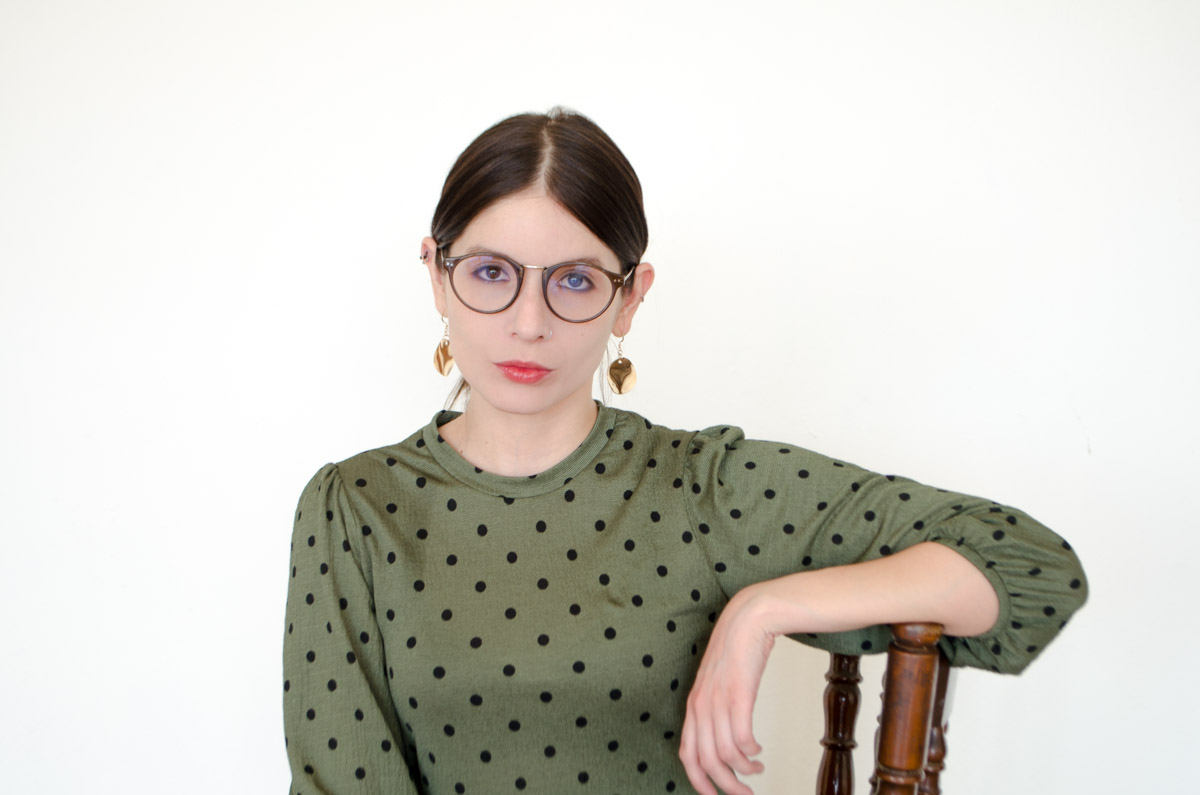
Aniela Rodríguez

Aniela Rodríguez (born 1992) is a Mexican poet and writer. She was born in Chihuahua, Mexico and obtained a bachelor's degree from the Universidad de Chihuahua and a master's degree from the Universidad Iberoamericana. . She is the author of the story collection El problema de los tres cuerpos and of the poetry collection Insurgencia. She won the 2016 Comala National Prize for Short Fiction by Young Writers. In 2021, she was named by Granta magazine as one of the best young writers in the Spanish language.
