= Politics (novel) =

2003 book by Adam Thirlwell

- Author: Adam Thirlwell
- Language: English
- Genre: Novel
- Publisher: Jonathan Cape
- Publication date: 28 August 2003
- Publication place: United Kingdom
- Media type: Print (Hardback & Paperback)
- Pages: 288 pp
- ISBN: 0-224-07104-1 (hardback edition) & ISBN 0-09-945902-7 (paperback edition)
- OCLC: 52455510

Politics is a 2003 novel by Adam Thirlwell about a father-daughter relationship and about a ménage à trois which includes said daughter and two of her friends. We are informed by the narrator that the novel is about "goodness".

== Plot summary ==
Nana, an attractive young "non-talker" in her mid-twenties—"tall, thin, pale, blonde, breasty"—who is working on her M.A. thesis, lives with her "Papa", the "benevolent angel" of the story, in Edgware, a suburb of London. She gets to know Moshe, a young Jewish actor from Finsbury, and they start a relationship. As time goes by, Anjali, a friend of Moshe's, joins them more and more in their spare-time activities until Nana, for whom sex is not necessarily a top priority, suggests a "threesome" because she wants Moshe to be happy.

Accordingly, due to Nana's altruism, for some months Nana and Moshe are joined in their lovemaking by Anjali, who is bisexual. The narrator, who defines a threesome as "the socialist utopia of sex", describes not only the sociology, psychology and ethics of their ménage à trois (for example by comparing it to the love triangle depicted in the film Cabaret) but also, in some detail, the technicalities and what he calls "sexual etiquette". However, he also frequently ponders philosophical questions and occasionally redefines old concepts such as that of infidelity ("the selfish desire to be helpful to more than one person").

In the summer Nana goes on holiday with her Papa, leaving behind two thirds of the ménage à trois. In Venice, Italy, Papa complains of a splitting headache, and shortly after their return to England he suffers a stroke—a good excuse for Nana to break up with both Moshe and Anjali, although her father is saddened by the thought of his daughter giving up her boyfriend on his account.

== Characters ==
- Nana – protagonist
- Papa – Nana's father
- Moshe – a Jewish actor
- Anjali – a bisexual

== Allusions/references to actual history, geography and current science ==
The ramblings of the narrator and Nana's interest in architecture lead to an impressive list of famous people being mentioned in the pages of Politics. Some are just briefly referred to, others are presented by means of an anecdote proving a point the narrator is trying to make. They include, in alphabetical order, Guillaume Apollinaire, Nikolai Bukharin, Mikhail Bulgakov, Antonio Gramsci, Václav Havel, Rem Koolhaas, Milan Kundera, Osip Mandelstam, Ludwig Mies van der Rohe, Issey Miyake, Józef Rotblat, Jonathan Sacks, Elsa Schiaparelli, Oscar Wilde, and Mao Zedong.

When rendering spoken language (see Estuary English), Thirlwell time and again uses pronunciation respelling. Accordingly, he has the protagonists say things like akshully, arkitetcha, fra bit, frages (= for ages), I dint say, I spose, internaschnal, keemo (= chemo (as in chemotherapy)), Le mgo, Not tonigh, refyoose, restron, snot (= it is not), and therpy.
