= João Paulo Cuenca =

Brazilian writer

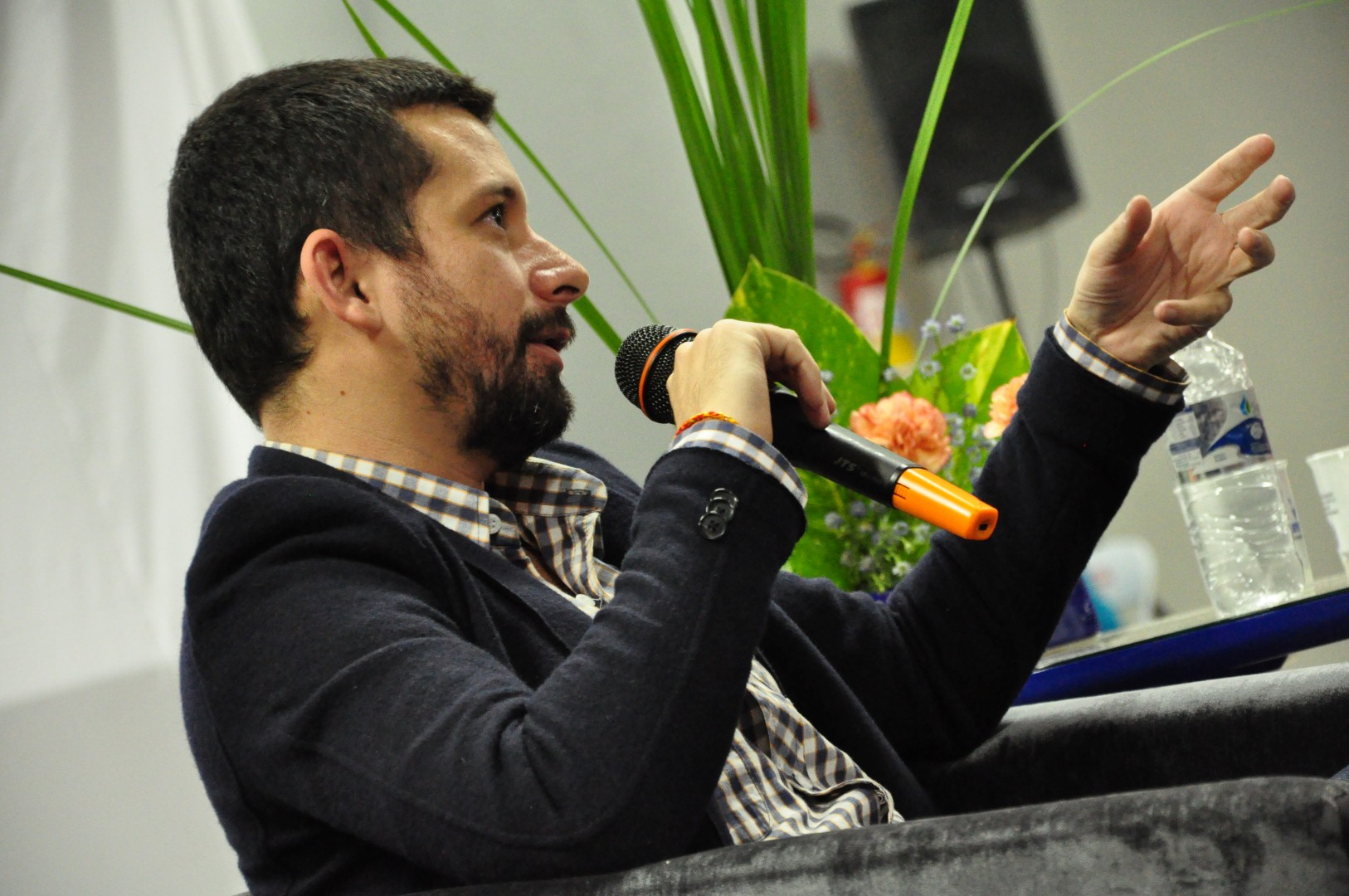
- Cuenca in 2012
- Born: August 4, 1978 (age 48); Rio de Janeiro, Rio de Janeiro, Brazil
- Education: UFRJ
- Writing career
- Language: Portuguese
- Genre: Magical Realism
- Notable work: Descobri que estava morto (2015)
- Notable awards: Prêmio Literário Biblioteca Nacional, 2016

João Paulo Cuenca (born August 4, 1978), also known as J.P. Cuenca, is an Argentine-Brazilian writer and filmmaker. He was selected for Bogotá39 in 2007 and for Best of Young Brazilian Writers by Granta in 2012.

== Career ==
João Paulo Cuenca was born in Rio de Janeiro, Brazil, in 1978. He is the author of “Body present” (2003), “The Mastroianni Day” (2007), “The only happy ending for a love story is an accident” (2010) and “The day I found out I was dead” (2015). His novels have been translated into eight languages and have had their rights sold to eleven countries. He has been a weekly columnist for major Brazilian newspapers and magazines since 2003 and now writes for Folha de S Paulo, the biggest national newspaper in Brazil. An anthology of his articles, “The last dawn”, was published in 2012.

In 2007, he was selected by the Hay Festival and the organisers of the Bogotá World Book Capital as one of the 39 highest profile Latin American writers under the age of 39. He was also selected for the first issue of Best of Young Brazilian Novelists in the Granta literary magazine in 2012. In recent years, he has written plays, films, and television scripts. "The Death of J.P. Cuenca" (2015), which was included in the first Venice Biennale College Production Lab, was his first feature film as a writer/director, premiered at the Rio and São Paulo International Film Festivals and had its European premiere at the main competition selection of the CPH:DOX in Denmark.

Apart from writing novels, Cuenca worked as a journalist and columnist for various Brazilian newspapers and magazines, among them O Globo. An anthology of his chronicles and columns appeared in the volume A última madrugada (2012; tr: The last dawn). João Paulo Cuenca's writing has appeared in anthologies both inside and outside of Brazil.

== Novels ==
- Corpo presente, Planeta, 2002
- O dia Mastroianni, Agir, 2007
- O único final feliz para uma história de amor é um acidente, Companhia das Letras, 2010
- Descobri que estava morto, Caminho, 2015

== Chronicles ==
- A Última Madrugada, LeYa, 2012

== Anthologies ==
- Parati para mim, Rio de Janeiro: Agir, 2003
- Prosas Cariocas, Rio de Janeiro: Casa da Palavra, 2004
- Contos sobre tela, Rio de Janeiro: Pinakotheke, 2005
- Paralelos, Rio de Janeiro: Agir, 2005
- Bogotá 39, Antologia de cuento latinoamericano, Bogotá:Ediciones B, 2007
- Cenas da Favela Geração Editorial, 2007
- B39 — Antologia de cuento latinoamericano Ediciones B, Uruguai 2007
- Bogotá 39, Antologia de cuento latinoamericano, Bogotá:Ediciones B, 2007
- Cem melhores crônicas brasileiras Editora Objetiva, 2007
- Missives – Nouvelles brésilliennes contemporaines Société Littéraire, França, 2008
- 10 cariocas, Rosario: Ferreyra Editor, 2009
- Libardade até agora Mobile Editorial, 2011
- Granta 9, Alfaguara, 2012.

== Translated publications ==
- Una giornata Mastroianni Cavalo di Fierro, Italy, 2008
- O Dia Mastroianni Caminho Editorial, Portugal, 2009
- Mastroianni. Ein Tag A-1, Germany, 2013
- O único final feliz para uma história de amor é um acidente, Caminho Editorial, Portugal, 2011
- El único final feliz para una história de amor es un accidente, (trad. Martín Caamaño), Editorial Lengua de Trapo, Spain, 2012
- Das einzig glückliche Ende einer Liebesgeschichte ist ein Unfall, (trad. Michael Kegler), A1 Verlag, Germany 2012
- The only happy ending for a love story is an accident, (trad. Elizabeth Lowe), Tagus Press, US, 20123
- La seule fin heureuse pour une histoire d’amour, c’est un accident, (trad. Dominique Nédellec), Cambourakis, France, 20123
- Ainoa onnellinen loppu rakkaustarinalle on onnettomuus, (trad. Pirkka Valkama), Ivan Rotta & Co, Finland, 2014
- Singurul final fericit pentru o poveste de dragoste e un accident, (trad. Iolanda Vasile), Polirom, Romania, 2015
- Cuerpo Presente, (trad. Martín Caamaño), Dakota, Argentina, set to be published 2016
- Ho scoperto di essere morto, (trad. Eloisa del Giudice), Miraggi Edizioni, Torino, 2016

== Film ==
- The Death of J.P. Cuenca, Duas Mariola, 2015

== TV ==
- Afinal, o que querem as mulheres? (com Cecilia Giannetti e Michel Melamed) Rede Globo, 2011
- "Estúdio i", na Globo News, como comentarista de literatura.
- "Nada tenho de meu", no Canal Brasil, November and December 2012.
