= Among the Thugs =

1991 book by Bill Buford

- June 1993 reprint edition cover
- Author: Bill Buford
- Language: English
- Subject: Football hooliganism
- Publisher: Secker & Warburg
- Publication date: 1991
- Publication place: London, England
- Media type: Hardback
- Pages: 317
- ISBN: 0-436-07526-1
- OCLC: 20418993
- LC Class: IN PROCESS

Among the Thugs: The Experience, and the Seduction, of Crowd Violence is a 1991 work of journalism by American writer Bill Buford documenting football hooliganism in the United Kingdom.

Buford, who lived in the UK at the time, became interested in crowd hooliganism when, on his way home from Cardiff in 1982 he boarded a train that was commandeered by supporters coming from a football match. He spent the next eight years going to football matches, befriending supporters, and witnessing riots, resulting in this book.

== Experiences ==
Buford is in several riots, notably in Turin and at the 1990 World Cup in Sardinia. He attends many games in the UK, spending time mostly with a group of Manchester United fans who refer to themselves as the Inter-City Jibbers. He goes to several National Front (NF) gatherings, as he regards the NF supporters as having a number of traits in common with football hooligans, one of which turns violent. He is beaten up by the Italian police, when caught with the rioting English supporters in Sardinia. He relates both first-hand and second-hand reports of hooligan violence, ranging from beatings to stabbings to a supporter biting out the eye of a police officer.

== Thesis ==
Buford does not offer a conclusive explanation for why he thinks that this violence occurs. However, he does write,

I was surprised by what I found; moreover, because I came away with a knowledge that I had not possessed before, I was also grateful, and surprised by that as well. I had not expected the violence to be so pleasurable....This is, if you like, the answer to the hundred-dollar question: why do young males riot every Saturday? They do it for the same reason that another generation drank too much, or smoked dope, or took hallucinogenic drugs, or behaved badly or rebelliously. Violence is their antisocial kick, their mind-altering experience, an adrenaline-induced euphoria that might be all the more powerful because it is generated by the body itself, with, I was convinced, many of the same addictive qualities that characterize synthetically-produced drugs.

He also suggests that crowds cannot be incited to violence against their will, contrary to the belief that otherwise pacific crowds can be stirred to violence by a persuasive leader. Buford also argues that those in a crowd collectively make the decision whether or not to cross thresholds of violence.

In 2008, Richard Danzig, a senior advisor to U.S. President Barack Obama, claimed that a lesson could be learned about terrorists by studying football hooligans. Referring to Among the Thugs, Danzig states that "one of the best books I’ve read on terrorism in recent years is not about terrorism at all. [Buford] describes the most appalling examples of soccer violence by fans against fans. But he describes with relentless honesty how he finds sickening things attractive. He says violence lets the adrenaline flow; it’s like sex, you live in the moment."

== See also ==
- Crowd psychology
- List of hooligan firms
- Ochlocracy
- Violence in sports
