= Andrés Ressia Colino =

Uruguayan writer

Andrés Ressia Colino is a Uruguayan writer. He was born in Montevideo in 1977. He studied biology at the Universidad de la Republica in Montevideo. He published his first short story in 2005, in the pages of Pimba! magazine, and his first novel Palcante in 2007. His second novel Parir (2008) won the Municipal Prize for Fiction.

In 2010, he was featured in The Best of Young Spanish Language Novelists issue of Granta magazine. He lives in Montevideo, where he works in the scientific field.
