= Antonio Prata =

Brazilian screenwriter and writer (born 1977)

Antonio Prata (born 1977 in São Paulo) is a Brazilian writer. He is son of the writers Mario Prata and Marta Góes. He has published more than ten books, including Douglas (2001), As pernas da tia Corália (2003), Adulterado (2009) and Meio intelectual, meio de esquerda (2010). He also writes for film and television and contributes a regular column to the newspaper Folha de S. Paulo.

He was named one of Granta's "Best Young Brazilian Writers" in 2012. He has won the Brasília Literature Award for best short story, and he was also a finalist for the Jabuti Prize in children's literature.
