= Melanie Rae Thon =

American writer (born 1957)

Melanie Rae Thon (b. 23 August 1957, last name pronounced “tone”) is an American writer who publishes fiction, poetry, nonfiction, and work that dissolves genre.

== Biography ==
Thon was born in Kalispell, Montana. She received a B.A. in English from the University of Michigan in 1980 and an M.A. in creative writing from Boston University in 1982. She has taught at Emerson College, the University of Massachusetts Boston, Syracuse University, Ohio State University, and the University of Utah, where she is Professor Emeritus.

== Writing ==
Thon's most recent books, chapbooks, and fine art editions are As If Fire Could Hide Us (2023); Silence & Song (2015); The 7th Man (2015); The Bodies of Birds (2019); Lover (2019); and The Good Samaritan Speaks (2015). She is also the composer of the novels The Voice of the River (2011); Sweet Hearts (2001); Meteors in August (1990); and Iona Moon (1993); and the story collections In This Light (2011); Girls in the Grass (1991); and First, Body (1997). Her work has been included in Best American Short Stories (1995, 1996); three Pushcart Prize Anthologies (2003, 2006, 2008); and O. Henry Prize Stories (2006). In 1996, Granta included Thon on its list of the Twenty Best Young American Novelists.

== Awards ==
Thon is a recipient of a Fellowship in Creative Arts from The John Simon Guggenheim Memorial Foundation (2016), a Whiting Writer's Award (1997), the Hopwood Award (1980), two Fellowships from the National Endowment for the Arts (1992, 2008), the Mountains & Plains Independent Booksellers Association Reading the West Book Award (2012), the Gina Berriault Award (2012), and a Lannan Foundation Writer's Residency in Marfa, Texas (2005). In 2009, she was Virgil C. Aldrich Fellow at the Tanner Humanities Center in Salt Lake City.

== Works ==
=== Books ===
- Meteors in August. Random House. 1990. ISBN 978-0-394-57664-0
- Girls in the Grass. Random House. 1991. ISBN 978-0-394-57663-3.
- Iona Moon. Simon & Schuster. 1993. ISBN 978-0-671-79687-7.
- First, Body. Houghton Mifflin. 1997. ISBN 978-0-395-78588-1.
  - "Little White Sister," Originally Published in Ploughshares, Winter 1993-1994
  - "Xmas, Jamaica Plain," Originally Published in Granta 54: Best of Young American Novelists, Summer 1996
- Sweet Hearts. Houghton Mifflin Harcourt. 2001. ISBN 978-0-395-78589-8.
- In This Light: New and Selected Stories. Graywolf Press. 2011.
- The Voice of the River. Fiction Collective 2. 2011. ISBN 978-1-573-66162-1.
- Silence & Song. Fiction Collective 2. 2015. ISBN 978-1-573-66053-2.
- The 7th Man. New Michigan Press. 2015. ISBN 978-1-934832-52-3.
- The Good Samaritan Speaks (Prompt 4). Prompt Press. 2015.
- Lover (Gallery Series 2). Prompt Press (limited fine art edition). 2018.
- The Bodies of Birds. New Michigan Press. 2019. ISBN 978-1-934832-68-4.
- As If Fire Could Hide Us. Fiction Collective 2. 2023. ISBN 978-1573662000 ISBN 978-1573662000

=== Fictions, Nonfictions, & Poetry ===
- “Orelia, from ever,” Literary Hub, Apr 2023
- “As Birds Vanish: A Love Song,” Conjunctions, Feb 2023
- “All Her Beautiful Children,” Image: No. 115: 7 – 8. 2023
- “Breaking Light”; "MRI: the brain”; “If Birds Were Water”; “Dearest”; “I am awash,” Five Points: Vol. 21, No. 2: 58 – 63. 2022
- “Lover,” Agni. (Reprinted on Literary Hub website May 2018)
- “The Gospel of Grief & Grace & Gratitude,” AGNI, July 2018 (Reprinted by Fiction Collective Two)
- “Galaxies Beyond Violet” Five Points, Vol 40, Spring 2013
- “Music & Meaning,” Architectures of Possibility: After Innovative Fiction, edited by Trevor Dodge and Lance Olsen, Guide Dog Books, 2012 (Reprinted by Fiction Collective Two)
- “The Heart Breaks and Breaks Open,” Glimmer Train, Bulletin 56, 2011
- "Love Song for the Mother of No Children,” Virginia Quarterly Review, Spring 2008
- “Translation,” SmokeLong Quarterly, Sept 2006
- "Tu B'Shvat: for the Drowned and the Saved," The Antioch Review, Spring 2006
- "Confession for Raymond Good Bird," AGNI, Jan 2006
- "Love Song for Tulanie Rey," StoryQuarterly, Jan 2006
- "Letters in the Snow," One Story, Issue 40, June 2004 (Reprinted in O. Henry Prize Stories 2006)
- "Dangerous Discoveries," The Pushcart Prize Anthology XXVII, Jan 2003 (Reprinted by Fiction Collective Two)
- "The Liberating Visions (and futile flight) of Melanie Little Crow," Image, Nov 2002
- "The River Woman's Son," Ploughshares, Spring 1997
- "Necessary Angels," The Paris Review, Fall 1994
- "Little White Sister," Ploughshares, Winter 1993
- "Punishment," The Southern Review, Winter 1990 (Reprinted in The Hopwood Awards: 75 Years of Prized Writing, edited by Nicholas Delbanco, Andrea Beauchamp, and Michael Barrett, University of Michigan Press, 2006)
- "Catch You Later," Ploughshares, Fall 1987
