= Angelina (given name) =

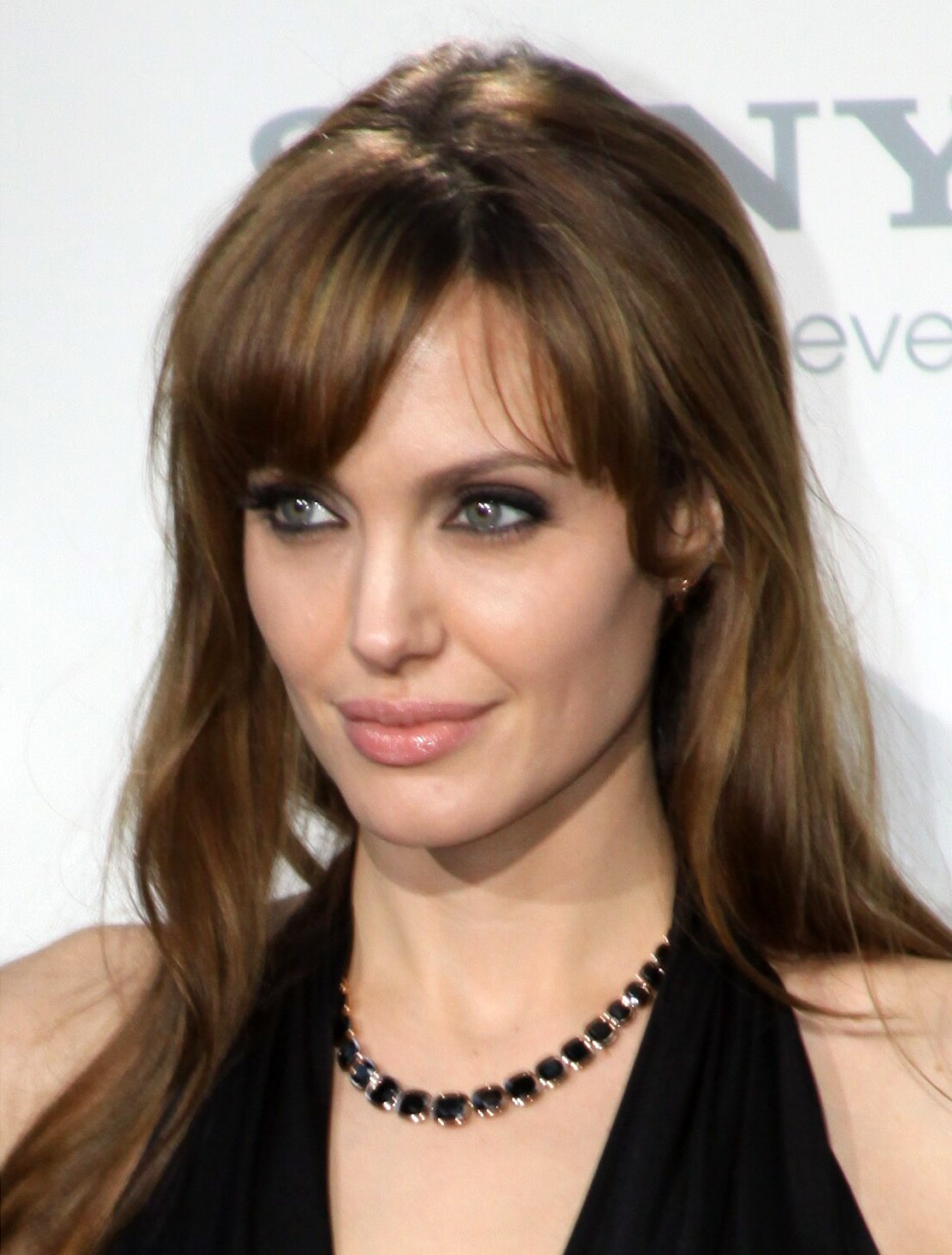
- Angelina Jolie who made the name common.
- Gender: Female
- Language: Greek

Origin
- Meaning: "Messenger, Messenger of God"

Other names
- Derived: Angela
- See also: Angie, Angel, Angeline, Angelica, Angelita

Angelina is a diminutive form of the name Angela, a name derived from the Greek angelos (Greek ἄγγελος) meaning messenger and archangel. Notable people and fictional characters with this name include:

== People ==
- Angeline of Marsciano (1357–1435), a religious figure of the Roman Catholic Church
- Angelina of Serbia (1440–1520), Serbian Orthodox saint and consort of Serbian Despot Stefan Branković
- Angelina Abbona (born 1951), Argentine jurist
- Angelina Acuña (1905–2006), Guatemalan writer and poet
- Angelina Anderson (born 2001), American professional soccer player
- Angelina Atyam (born 1946), Ugandan human rights activist and midwife
- Angelina Banytė (born 1949), Lithuanian painter
- Angelina Beloff (1879–1969), Russian-born artist who did most of her work in Mexico
- Angelina Carreño Mijares (born 1981), Mexican politician
- Angelina Castro (born 1982), Cuban-American pornographic actress
- Angelina Danilova (born 1996), Russian television personality and model
- Angelina Dehn (born 1995), aka Ängie, Swedish singer
- Angelina Eberly (1798–1860), innkeeper during the Texas Archives War
- Angelina Eichhorst, Head of the EU Delegation to the Lebanese Republic from January 2011
- Angelina Fares (born 1989), Israeli beauty pageant contestant
- Angelina Gabueva (born 1988), Russian tennis player
- Angelina Golikova (born 1991), Russian speed skater
- Angelina Grimké (1805–1879), American abolitionist and suffragist
- Angelina Weld Grimké (1880–1958), journalist and poet
- Angelina Grün (born 1979), German Olympic volleyball player, born in Tajikistan
- Angelina Gualdoni (born 1975), artist based in New York
- Angelina Hix (born 1993), American soccer player
- Angelina Margaret Hoare (1843–1892), English missionary to British India
- Angelina Jensen (born 1973), Danish curler
- Angelina Jolie (born 1975), American film actress, UN Goodwill Ambassador
- Angelina Jordan (born 2006), Norwegian singer
- Angelina Kanana (born 1965), Kenyan long-distance runner
- Angelina J. Knox (1819–1896), American inventor, abolitionist
- Angelina Kučvaļska (born 1998), Latvian figure skater
- Angelina Kysla (born 1991), Ukrainian artistic gymnast
- Angelina Lazarenko (born 1998), Russian volleyball player
- Angelina Love, ring name of Canadian professional wrestler Lauren Williams (born 1981)
- Angelina Lübcke (born 1991), German footballer
- Angelina Maccarone (born 1965), German film director and writer
- Angelina Mango (born 2001), Italian singer-songwriter
- Angelina Melnikova (born 2000), Russian artistic gymnast
- Angelina Michshuk (born 1988), Kazakhstani sport shooter
- Angelina Mikhaylova (born 1960), Bulgarian basketball player who competed in the 1980 Summer Olympics
- Angelina Muñiz-Huberman (born 1936), Mexican writer and poet
- Angelina Noble (c.1879–1964), Australian linguist and missionary
- Angelina Napolitano (1882–1932), immigrant to Canada who murdered her abusive husband in 1911
- Angelina Nikonova (born 1976), Russian filmmaker, script writer and film producer
- Angelina Pagano (1888–1962), Argentine stage and film actress
- Angelina Pivarnick (born 1986), American television personality, model, professional wrestler and singer
- Angelina Pwerle (born c. 1939), Australian Aboriginal artist
- Angelina Simakova (born 2002), Russian artistic gymnast
- Angelina Sandoval-Gutierrez (born 1938), Filipino jurist, Associate Justice of the Supreme Court of the Philippines
- Angelina Telegina (born 1992), Russian ice dancer
- Angelina Teny, South Sudan politician, state minister of Energy and Mining
- Angelina Topić (born 2005), Serbian athlete specialising in the high jump
- Angelina Turenko (born 1988), Russian competitive figure skater
- Angelina Usanova (born 1997), Ukrainian model and musician
- Angelina Vidal (1847–1917), Portuguese writer, editor, and women's rights advocate
- Angelina Vovk (born 1942), Soviet and Russian television and radio host
- Angelina Wapakhabulo (born 1949), founding member and co-chair of the United Way Board, Uganda
- Angelina Virginia Winkler (1842–1911), American journalist, editor, magazine publisher
- Anna Angelina Wolfers (born 1978), German actress, model and entrepreneur
- Angelina Yates (born 1980), New Zealand netball player in the ANZ Championship
- Angelina Yushkova (born 1979), Russian gymnast
- Angelina Zhuk-Krasnova (born 1991), Russian athlete specialising in the pole vault

== Fictional characters ==
- Angelina, principal character in the opera La Cenerentola by Rossini, equivalent to Cinderella
- Angelina Ballerina, fictional mouse created by author Katharine Holabird and illustrator Helen Craig
- Angelina Johnson, in J. K. Rowling's Harry Potter
- Angelina Tyler, in Scream 3
- Angelina Veneziano, from the American soap opera The Young and the Restless

== See also ==
- Angelina (disambiguation)
- Angelina (surname)
- Angela (given name)
- Angelina (disambiguation)
