= Angelina =

Angelina may refer to:

== People ==
=== Given name ===
- Angelina (given name), a feminine given name, including a list of people with this name

=== Surname ===
- Angelina (surname), includes a list of people with this surname

=== Mononym ===
- Angelina (American singer) (born 1976 as Angelina Camarillo Ramos), American singer
- Angelina (French singer) (born 2006 as Angélina Nava), French singer
- Angelina (footballer) (born 2000 as Angelina Alonso Costantino), Brazilian footballer
- Angeline of Marsciano (1357–1435), a religious figure of the Roman Catholic Church
- Angelina of Serbia, (ca. 1440–1520)), a saint of the Serbian Orthodox Church
- Angelina of Calgary, born 2005 as Angelina Burcevski, poor university student at the UofC

=== Other ===
- Angelina, principal character in the opera La Cenerentola by Rossini, equivalent to Cinderella

== Businesses and agencies ==
- Angelina (tea house), a café in Paris, France
- Angelina College, a community college in Lufkin, Texas, U.S.
- Angelina & Neches River Authority, an independent government agency in Texas

== Entertainment ==
=== Songs ===
- "Angelina" (Louis Prima song), 1944
- "Angelina" (Irving Burgie song), from the 1961 album Jump Up Calypso by Harry Belafonte
- "Angelina" (George Kooymans song), from the 1969 album On the Double by Golden Earring
- "Angelina" (Neil Innes song), from the 1970 album Play It Loud by Slade
- "Angelina" (Bob Dylan song), 1981
- "Angelina" (PSY song), 1991
- "Angelina" (Lou Bega song), from the 2001 album Ladies and Gentlemen by Lou Bega
- "Angelina" (Steve Hogarth song), from the 2004 album Marbles by Marillion
- "Angelina" (Sam Endicott song), from the 2007 album The Sun and the Moon by The Bravery
- "Angelina" (Lights song), from the 2025 album A6Extended by Lights

=== Other ===
- Angelina (film), a 1947 film directed by Luigi Zampa
- Angelina Ballerina, a children's book series published 1983–2021
  - Angelina Ballerina (TV series), an animated preschool children's television series based on the books that ran from 2001 to 2006
  - Angelina Ballerina: The Next Steps, a CGI preschool animated children's television series (2009–2010)
- Cielo de Angelina, a Philippine television drama series (2012–2013)
- Farewell, Angelina, a 1965 album by American folk singer Joan Baez
- Looking for Angelina, a 2005 Canadian drama film based on the murder case involving Angelina Napolitano

== Places ==
- Angelina, Santa Catarina, Brazil, a municipality
- Angelina County, Texas, U.S.
  - Angelina National Forest
  - Angelina River

== Science ==
- 64 Angelina, an asteroid
- Angelina (fungus), a genus of fungi in the family Dermateaceae
- Angelina (trilobite), a genus of extinct arthropods from the early Silurian
- Libellula angelina, a species of dragonfly also known as bekko tombo

== Transportation ==
- Angelina County Airport, near Lufkin, Texas, U.S.
- Angelina Field, an airport in Cotuí, Dominican Republic
- Angelina and Neches River Railroad, a short-line railroad headquartered in Lufkin, Texas, U.S.
- Angelina River Bridge, in Lufkin, Texas, U.S.

== See also ==
- Angel (disambiguation)
- Angela (disambiguation)
- Angeleno, a term for residents of Los Angeles, California
- Angelia, a daughter of the Greek messenger-god Hermes
- Angeline (disambiguation)
- Angelini (surname)
- Angelino (disambiguation)
- Angelyne (disambiguation)
