= Community Inspiring Today's Youth =

Non-profit organization

- Founded: November 2013; 13 years ago
- Founder: Chandra Stovall
- Type: 501(c)(3)
- Purpose: Mentorship
- Location: Los Angeles, California, United States
- Employees: 5+
- Website: TCPYouth.org

Community Inspiring Today’s Youth or The CITY is a Los Angeles based non-profit organization founded in 2013. Their primary focus is to develop entrepreneurship programs and mentor opportunities for troubled or previously incarcerated youth. The organization is notable for its annual star-studded CITY Gala.

== History ==
The pilot program for The CITY began in 2006 by Southern California native, Chandra Stovall, who now serves as the executive director. Stovall developed several youth entrepreneurship programs in the Watts and Echo Park neighborhoods of Los Angeles. Through these programs, The CITY was able to produce an entirely youth-generated revenue that reached over $6,000.

The organization was officially enacted in 2013 and its official launch ceremony, Fame and Philanthropy was attended by several notable cynosures including Charlize Theron, Sean Penn, Halle Berry, and a keynote speech from director James Cameron. The event is noted to have raised enough money to provide operating expenses for the entire organization for two years.

== CITY Gala ==
Since the Fame and Philanthropy gala, The CITY has hosted an annual awards ceremony and speaker summit known as the CITY Gala. This annual gala features speeches from top leaders in the entertainment industry, musical performance from A-list celebrities, and worldwide media coverage. The next CITY Gala will take place at the Playboy Mansion and feature a speech from business mogul Richard Branson. Also during the event, Buzz Aldrin will be awarded a lifetime achievement award, and John Paul DeJoria will be honored. CITY Gala 2016 will be hosted by Sean Combs and 98 Degrees member Jeff Timmons.
