= Anra =

Anra or ANRA may refer to:

== Organisations ==
- Advances in Neuroblastoma Research Association, an international peak body for neuroblastoma researchers
- Angelina & Neches River Authority, an independent government agency in Texas, U.S.
- ANRA Technologies, a company trialling drones with Swiggy, an Indian online food delivery platform
- Arapaho National Recreation Area, a recreation area in Colorado, U.S.
- Armenian Nuclear Regulatory Authority, a member of Western European Nuclear Regulators' Association
- Australian National Research Agenda, a national research framework in Australia
- Australian National Retailers Association, headed by Margy Osmond until 2014

== Other uses ==
- Ann Alexia Anra, Indian actress, in the 2000 film Hera Pheri
- Anra, an international conference held in Korea in 529
- Anra District, a district in Huari Province, Peru
- Anra scarab, scarab seals from Second Intermediate Period, found in the Levant, Egypt, and Nubia

== See also ==
- Anras, a municipality in the district of Lienz, Tyrol, Austria
