= Education in Lebanon =

Education in Lebanon is regulated by the Ministry of Education and Higher Education (MEHE). In Lebanon, English and/or French with Arabic are taught from early years in schools. English or French are the required media of instruction for mathematics and sciences for all schools. Education is compulsory from age 3 to 14.

According to a 2013 World Economic Forum (WEF) report, Lebanon was ranked 17th in overall quality of education, and 5th in science and mathematics. The survey was carried out as part of the WEF's Global Competitiveness Report. According to Muhammad Faour, a nonresident senior associate at the Carnegie Middle East Center in Beirut, "this assessment is a significant departure from the results of student achievement tests in every international test Lebanon and Qatar have participated in."

According to the Organization for Economic Co-operation and Development (OECD) and compiled from an amalgamation of international assessments, including the OECD's Pisa tests, the TIMSS tests run by US-based academics as well as the TERCE tests in Latin America, Lebanon ranked 13th globally in mathematics and sciences. In the international student achievement tests in math and sciences (TIMSS) in 2007 and 2011 for grade 8, Lebanese students scored well below the international average of 500. In math, Lebanon scored 449 during both 2007 and 2011.

Lebanon's adult literacy rate was 97.9% in 2014 according to the UN Human Development Index, ranking it 65th globally.

== History ==
The Lebanese Council of 1736 urged the Maronite clergy to create schools in every village in order to educate both men and women. It further ordered that Arabic be the language of teaching and that it should be taught next to Syriac, the Maronite liturgical language.

During the Ottoman period, networks of public schools coexisted alongside foreign missionary schools established by European and American religious organizations.

In 1920, during the French Mandate, the largest administrative institution for Lebanon (and Syria) was established, the Service de l'instruction Publique, also known under the abbreviation SIP. SIP was responsible for organizing education policies across Lebanon and subsidized existing educational institutions; private, public and religious alike. One of the main goals of the SIP was also to ensure that the French language was being taught in every school. Public schools were directed under a unified curriculum controlled by the SIP, whereas private schools had more autonomy. A clause in the 1922 draft of the 1926 constitution, drafted during the French mandate, emphasised in article 10 the freedom of education service providers, notably on the right of religious communities.

The French mandate did not invest sufficient funds in Lebanon's public education system. This was already evident in 1938, when the number of private schools and students enrolled in them exceeded the number of public schools and students attending them. The mandate had by then opened 177 public schools, teaching 18.000 students, compared to 1.180 private schools that were attended by 76.196 students. Permitting religious and non-religious communities to establish their own schools and determine their own curriculum allowed the SIP to cut costs. In exchange for this independence, they only required the schools to include a set number of French language instruction hours per week. Although many schools were founded by specific religious communities or missionary organizations, students and teachers frequently moved between institutions, and schools often educated pupils from different confessional backgrounds. Nadya Sbaiti, a historian, has noted that these educational networks sometimes created “communities of knowledge,” in which ideas circulated across sectarian boundaries through shared curricula and teaching staff. Though the public education sector expanded significantly since independence in 1943, the private sector is still dominant with respect to number of schools and students. Driven by different visions of citizenship, the Lebanese program of education has undergone three curricular reforms (1946, 1968-1971, 1997). After gaining independence, the Lebanese government wrote in 1946 the first national curriculum, modifying the 1926 Ministère de l'Instruction Publique of the French Mandate. The goal was to foster a Lebanese national identity by demanding Arabic as main language of study and nurturing patriotism. The second curricular reform in 1968-1971 was triggered by the rise of Pan-Arabism, which sought to set a Pan-Arabic identity over Lebanese nationalism. Educational institutions in Lebanon have historically played an important role in shaping political and cultural identities, including debates over Lebanese nationalism, Arab nationalism, and citizenship.

During the Lebanese Civil War, the various factions published their own history education books, trying to control historical narratives. Students and teachers often joined militias for protection, bringing arms to school and showcasing their allegiance through debates and graffiti. When the new Government of Lebanon signed the three-part blueprint for reconstruction into law in 1990, the third section of this peace agreement outlined five points for education reform.

The third major reform was a result of this and in 1994, the CERD carried out the Plan for Educational reform, which resulted in a revised national curriculum. The history curriculum caused controversy and subsequently did not pass reform legislature. Subsequent events to write a great narrative failed too, creating a gridlock and thus resulting in an unchanged 1968-71 history education curriculum.

=== Impact of the 2026 Israel–Lebanon war ===
The war between Israel and Lebanon has displaced hundreds of thousands of students and teachers. Education experts have expressed concern that the conflict may have created a lost generation of Lebanese students, widened social inequalities, and undermined national unity. Schools across southern Lebanon have been destroyed, and hundreds of educational institutions have been converted into temporary shelters for displaced people. These disruptions have added to the existing challenges facing Lebanon's education system, which had already been weakened by a severe economic crisis. In response, some schools in Lebanon have adopted online learning and other programs to reach students. However, education experts in the country have noted that many students remain without access to education. Moreover, efforts to compensate for lost instructional time have focused mainly on subjects such as science and mathematics, while topics like citizenship education have been neglected. According to Carlos Naffah, an academic researcher quoted by Al Jazeera, this approach could have dangerous consequences in a country like Lebanon, which is home to multiple religious sects.

== Education System ==
The Lebanese educational system consists of 5 cycles, which are divided among 3 main subdivisions: the preschool, basic, and secondary stages. The stage of preschool education (cycle 1) begins at the age of 3 or 4. Basic education, which is considered compulsory, continues from the age of 6 to the age of 14. It includes two levels: the elementary and intermediate level. The elementary phase includes grades 1 to 3 (cycle 2), and grades 4 to 6 (cycle 3). The intermediate level comprises grades 7 to 9 (cycle 4). Finally, the stage of secondary education continues from grades 10 to 12 (cycle 5). It is usually completed at the age of 18, and ends with a Baccalaureat or professional certificate, of which either can give access to tertiary education.

It is worth noting that an estimated two-thirds of Lebanese students attend private schools. In April 2015, the Minister of Education, Elias Bou Saab, acknowledged the myriad challenges and gaps that exist in the Lebanese school system, and the public schools, particularly. While the Lebanese law stipulates that the national curriculum should be updated every four years, it has not been updated since 2000. Additionally, because of the national disagreement over Lebanon's modern history, history textbooks cover historical events before 1945 only.

The national exams (Grade 9 Brevet and Grade 12 Baccalaureate) were not graded in 2014.

=== Preschool education ===
Preschool education aims to initiate children into the school environment. The goal of pre-school education is to create a favorable climate for children to communicate with others, develop their physical capacities, limb control and coordination of their movements, and educate their senses. Preschool education also takes into account the physiological, moral, and intellectual development of children. According to the World Bank database, the gross enrollment rate of preschool education is 62.5 percent for male, 68.3 percent for female, and 64.4 percent for total in 2006. Also, the private enrollment share for preschool education marked 80.3 percent in 2008.

=== Basic education ===
==== Elementary Level ====
According to the Worlds database, gross enrollment rate of elementary level of basic education is for 96.8 percent for male, 93.9 percent for female, and 95.4 percent for total in 2007. Private enrollment share in elementary level is 67.6 percent in 2007.

==== Intermediate level ====
Primary completion rate of Lebanon (US$6,000 GNI per capita in 2007) is lower than that of Tunisia, Jordan, Iran, Algeria, West Bank and Egypt (all of which have lower GNI per capita). Primary completion rates have not improved during the period 1995/96 to 2003/04. In 2007, Primary completion rate is 79.8 percent for male, 83.3 percent for female, and 81.5 percent for total. According to UIS database, technical and vocational enrollment as percent of total enrollment in intermediate level is 5.1 percent in 2008. Private enrollment share of general education in intermediate level is 60.2 percent and that of technical and vocational education is 56.8 percent in 2008.

=== Secondary education ===
Secondary education is three years of education, the first year is common for all students, and the second year is either scientific or literature whereas the third year consists of (humanities, economics, life sciences, general sciences) and technical education (about 55 different fields of study). Most schools, however have deviated from this system. They usually do not offer Humanities education, citing socio-economics as a better and more efficient alternative School principals decide students’ path based on students’ aptitude as shown by the first secondary and second secondary years. When students complete three years education, they take official Lebanese Baccalaureate exams in their respective tracks (four in all). Students who finish examinations successfully obtain the Lebanese Baccalaureate Certificate of Secondary Education (Shahaadat Al-Bakaalouriya al Lubnaaniya l’il-ta ‘liim al-Thaanawi) or the Technical Baccalaureate (Al-Bakaalouriya al-Finniya). In 2014, the Minister of Education passed all students who took the exam, regardless of their score.

According to the United Nations Human Development Index, the gross enrollment rate for secondary school is 74%.

Palestinian refugees in Lebanon have limited access to public secondary education. Most of them are not able to afford the high cost of private secondary education. UNRWA operates three secondary schools in Beirut, Saida and Tyre. Schools operated by UNRWA partially offset the absence of available educational opportunities at the secondary school level. (UNRWA website) According to the World Bank database, the gross enrollment rate of secondary education is 69.8 percent for males, 80.2 percent for females, and 74.9 percent for total. According to the UIS database, technical and vocational enrollment as a percent of total enrollment in the secondary level is 27.8 percent in 2008. The private enrollment share of general education in the intermediate level is 49.8 percent and that of technical and vocational education is 56.9 percent in 2008.

Lebanon participated in TIMSS in 2003 and 2007. Score of mathematics at 8th grade is 433 in 2003 and 449 in 2007. Score of science at 8th grade is 435 in 2003 and 404 in 2007. At the end of middle school, each student has to enter the official exams.

=== Tertiary education ===
Tertiary education in Lebanon is composed of Technical and Vocational Institutes, University colleges, University Institutes and Universities. The Lebanese University is the only public institution. The Ministry of Education and Higher Education administers the private and public sectors, and Technical and Vocational Institutes are under the Directorate General of Technical and Vocational Education. The Directorate General of Higher Education has responsibility for University Colleges, University Institutes and Universities.

According to the World Bank database, gross enrollment rate of tertiary education (the percentage of students who go on to tertiary education within five years of completing secondary education) was 48% in 2013.

With university graduates making up 30% of people seeking a job, it is clear that the Higher Education system needs to play a key role in resolving the problem of youth unemployment in Lebanon. The key issue related to this sector is the mismatch between the highly skilled graduates that universities supply and the skills and professionals the labor market demands; these supply-demand failings in the labor market are increasingly preventing young people from finding a job in their country that fits their qualifications. In order to address these issues, universities can implement policies to reform the curricula to better prepare graduates for their professional life, improve career guidance structures and activities, and invest in relevant research, statistics and data gathering.

Lebanon has 41 nationally accredited universities, several of which are internationally recognized. The American University of Beirut (AUB) and the Saint Joseph University of Beirut (USJ) were the first Anglophone and the first Francophone universities to open in Lebanon respectively. The majority of the forty-one universities, both public and private, largely operate in French or English, the two most widely used foreign languages in Lebanon.

At the English speaking universities, students who have graduated from an American-style high school program enter at the freshman level to earn their baccalaureate equivalence from the Ministry of Education and Higher Education. This qualifies them to continue studying at the higher levels. These students are required to have already taken the SAT I and the SAT II (Subjects Test) upon applying to college, in lieu of the official exams. On the other hand, students who have graduated from a school that follows the Lebanese educational system are directly admitted to the sophomore year. These students are still required to take the SAT I, but not the SAT II.

The highest-ranked universities in Lebanon include the American University of Beirut (AUB), the Lebanese American University (LAU), the Saint Joseph University of Beirut (USJ), the Lebanese University (LU), the University of Balamand (UOB), the Université Saint-Esprit de Kaslik (USEK), Beirut Arab University (BAU), the American University of Science and Technology (AUST), the Lebanese International University (LIU), and the Notre Dame University - Louaize (NDU). QS Top Universities ranks AUB second in the Arab world.

Not all private higher educational institutions in Lebanon consider SAT I or SAT II for undergraduate admissions. The majority require a local entrance test prepared by these individual higher educational institutions. In most cases, the entrance test is a placement test. The main requirement for undergraduate admissions for Lebanese students is the secondary-school leaving certificate called the Baccalaureate II or more recently the International Baccalaureate. However, students with a foreign nationality are admitted to private higher education institutions that pattern after the American system of higher education as Freshman students in case they do not have an equivalence to the Baccalaureate II. In case they obtain an equivalence from the Ministry of Education and Higher Education, they are admitted as sophomore students. As for the Lebanese University, which is the only public higher educational institution in Lebanon, students are admitted to undergraduate programs based on the Baccalaureate II certificate. A number of faculties at the Lebanese University, such as the Faculty of Sciences, require further testing for selectivity based on entrance tests (concours) prepared and administered by this faculty.

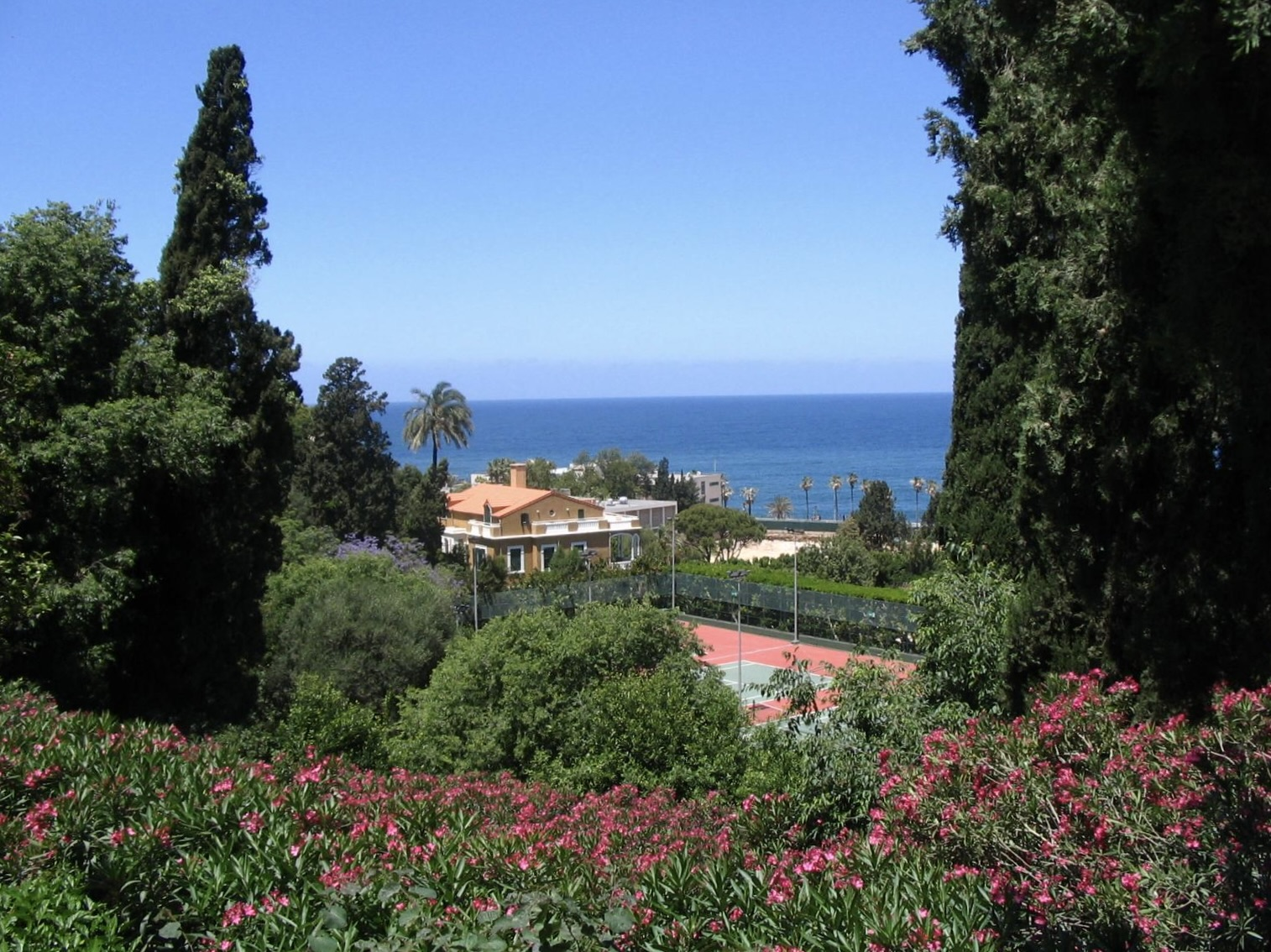
AUB established in 1866 by the American Board of Commissioners for Foreign Missions.

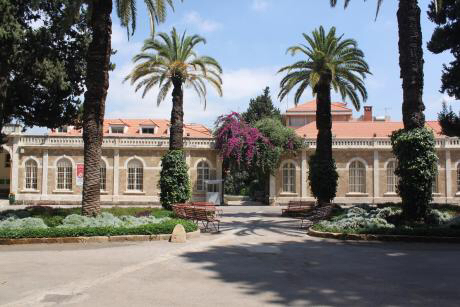
Entrance to the Medical Sciences Campus of Saint Joseph University of Beirut. The university was founded in 1875 by French Jesuit missionaries.

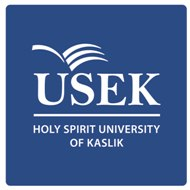
Holy Spirit University of Kaslik, or Université Saint-Esprit de Kaslik, founded by the Lebanese Maronite Order (LMO) in 1938.

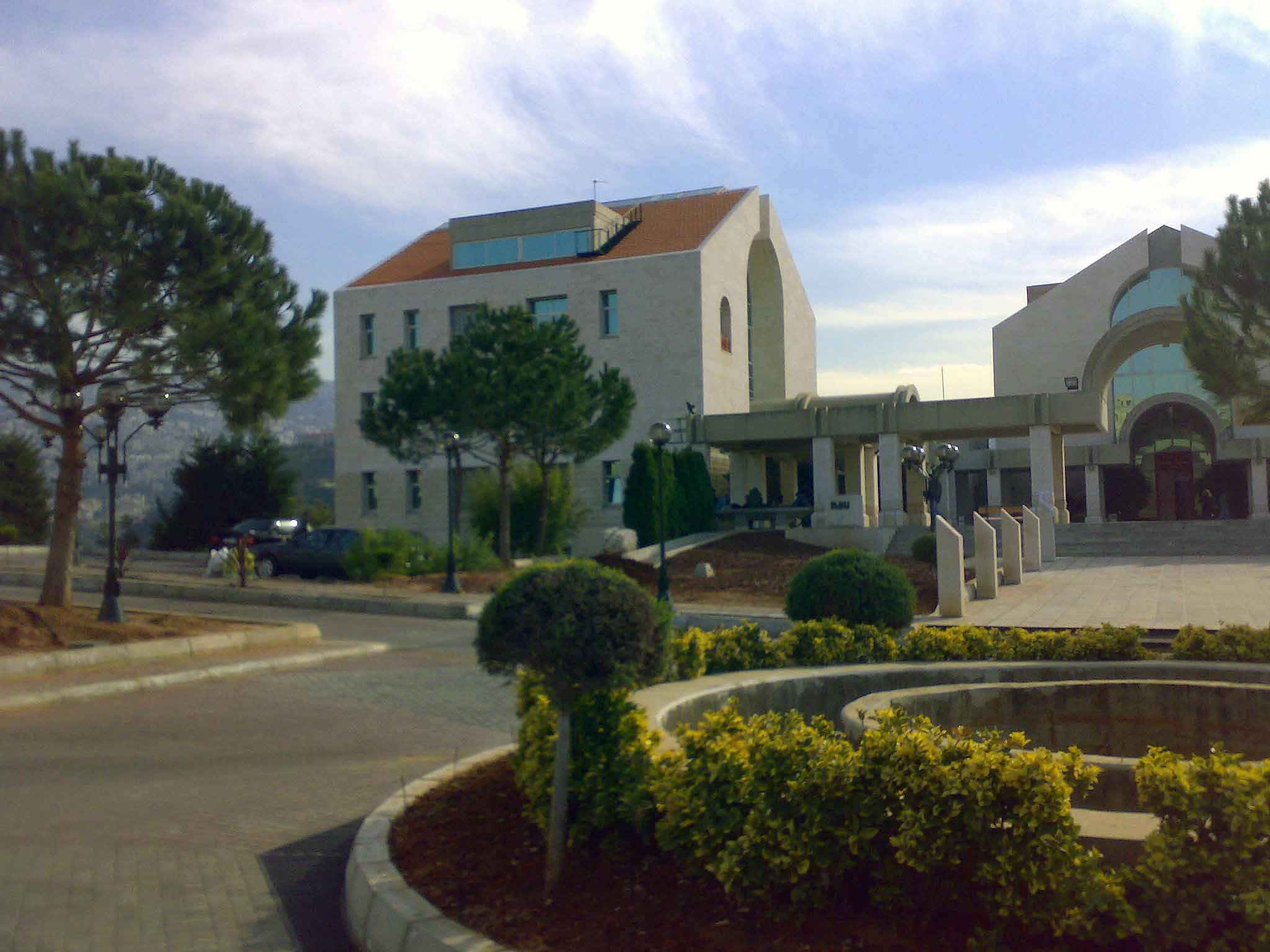
NDU, founded by the Maronite Order of The Holy Virgin Mary in 1978.

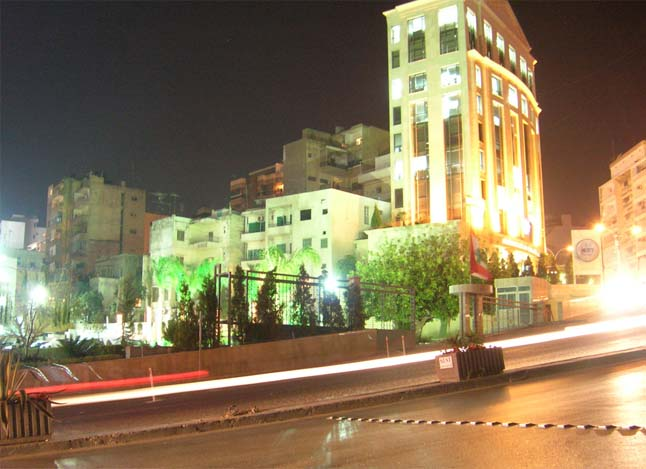
American University of Science and Technology, founded in Achrafieh in 1989.

== Center for Educational Research and Development (CRDP) ==
=== About ===
It was established on 10 December 1971 as a public institution. CRDP has a juristic persona that enjoys administrative and financial autonomy. It directly reports to the Minister of Education and Higher Education who represents the custodial authority in the government. The Center for Educational Research and Development (CERD) is an autonomous staff organization under the trusteeship of the MOEHE. CERD's tasks are 1) to draft curricula of academic and vocational education for the pre-university education stage, 2) to revise and modify the curricula according to the necessity, 3) to prepare all means and ways for applying these curricula, 4) to do educational research, 5) to secure training for pre-university teachers, 6) to prepare the curricula in all subject areas, 7) to provide teacher training, 8) to write textbooks, and 9) to conduct evaluations, etc.

=== Objectives ===
CRDP aims at establishing the following core principles.

- Establish an official central body to control educational topics through recruiting qualified personas. This professional enrollment allows the government to process developmental educational strategies to enhance the status of education in Lebanon.
- Present themselves as being proactively present through integrated scientific, technological and cultural developmental approaches.
- Establish a formal educational authority to cooperate with similar bodies in other countries.

== CRDP projects ==
=== My Book (Kitabi) ===
My Book (Kitabi) is a funded project by the USAID. The project's main aim is to develop better learning outcomes and provide equal opportunities for students to enroll in formal schools. Kitabi project aims at lessening the pressure on the educational sector due to Syrian refugees overflow into Lebanese public schools.

=== European Union Project: Access to Education ===
The Head of the Delegation of the European Union to Lebanon, Ambassador Angelina Eichhorst, and the Director of the British Council in Lebanon, Eunice Crook, signed a contract worth 1.3 million euros to facilitate the integration of students into the Lebanese public school system. The project's main aim is to support the Ministry of Education with all its legal bodies in the process of developing a methodology for language teaching and cultural awareness. The project trained 25 teacher trainers and 1500 Lebanese teachers to improve their language and teaching skills, that has a direct impact on the beneficiaries, Syrian and Lebanese students.

=== IFADEM ===
Francophonie Initiative for Distance Training of French Language Teachers in Primary Schools in the Lebanese Republic (IFADEM) initiative aims at training teachers remotely to improve their professional competency level, mainly in the educational field. The program targets primary school teachers who are already in educational service, in teaching French and teaching in French. Francophonie Initiative for Distance Training of French Language Teachers in Primary Schools in the Lebanese Republic (IFADEM) proposes and presents training programs that are partly remote, and personalized for the teacher's needs.

=== Curriculum Development Project ===
Many factors contributed to the launching of this project. The Educational Center for Research and Development main goal is to develop educational curricula, and at the same time continuous evaluation of these curricula.

=== Quality Approach ===
CRDP which aim at improving the training, resources, documentation, research and information system, will have a medium-term strategy for an agreed and planned program continuously, aiming at engaging the guidelines for national education policy.

=== Child safety on the Internet ===
The target aim for this project is creating a safer environment and raising awareness about the proper and responsible use of the Internet among children, parents and caregivers.

=== The International Student Assessment Program (PISA) ===
Adapting this program is meant for measuring the readiness of students, who are about to complete their general or vocational education, or enter the labor market, to meet the challenges of their societies.

=== Education Project for Sustainable Development ===
This project is committed to construct action that can only be achieved through introducing the importance of sustainable development to every person and every society, through a comprehensive approach that develops knowledge and enhances the skills necessary to achieve a sustainable future.

=== School Map ===
It acts as an advanced tool to support reading the educational reality and planning its development. It targets submitting proposals to the decision-making authority about the needs of formal education according to specific geographical locations.

=== The International Study of Trends in Levels of Performance in Mathematics and Science (TIMSS) ===
The International Mathematics and Science Study Trends in International Mathematics and Sciences Study - TIMSS came to provide a number of qualitative and quantitative indicators on the reality of education systems in the participating countries, monitoring and controlling them, which aims at evaluating and improving them, that is why this project was adopted.

=== Interactive Panels Project ===
These installations, the interactive panels, are being used in twenty-first century schools as a modern and interactive method of education based on the use of electromagnetic theory to transfer information between the teacher's computer and the projector of the board and the board.

=== Project to Support Syrian Students in Lebanese Public Schools ===
This project was launched after the UNICEF and the Educational Center for Research and Development have expressed their desire to provide the educational means necessary for the enrollment of Syrian children in public schools and to support the stumbling Lebanese students in these schools by developing a curriculum relevant to their needs.

=== Shakespeare Lives in Schools ===
Both CERD and the British Council have collaborated to produce a Shakespeare school pack that has been specially adapted for Lebanon in order to facilitate the Teaching of Shakespeare's plays in schools.

=== Population Education ===
This project falls within the National Program for Reproductive Health and within the framework of the second cooperation program (2002-2008) between the United Nations Population Fund and the Lebanese government.

=== Back to School ===
A coursework program for children who drop out of ages 9–11. It is a joint project between UNESCO and the Educational Center for Research and Development.

=== Community service ===
The main concept of " community service " project is to activate in the empowerment of citizenship belief and diversity.

=== Raising Awareness of the Dangers of Drug Addiction ===
This project will include many different educational products and other resources that would guide learners of different age groups. It also serves in accompanying them in various educational sessions to develop awareness and enhance life skills.

=== Psychosocial Support ===
The project has two main dimensional goals. It works to enhance socio-emotional learning by enhancing its core competencies and including it in modern curricula and in various subjects.

== Education Management ==
The Ministry of Education and Higher Education (MOEHE) regulates all education institutes in the public sector through a regional education system. The education system in Lebanon is centralized, and this regulation is not direct. The education system is managed through regional education bureaus. Public schools are monitored by the regional education bureaus in the governorates. The regional education bureau serves as liaisons between the public school and the directorates of education at the ministry's headquarters. Private schools have their own organization, but private schools are still subject to the authority of the MOEHE.

== Education Finance ==
According to the United Nations Human Development Index 2014, public education expenditure as a percentage of GDP was 1.65 in 2014. Public schools are financed by the Ministry of Education and private schools are financed by students' fees. The processes involved in curricula drafting and modification, and teacher training are mainly financed by non-government funds such as private companies or international bodies, which include the World Bank and the UNDP.

== Curriculum ==
=== Overview ===
The Lebanese curriculum is used at all public and private schools in Lebanon. Schools have to apply both the Lebanese and foreign schemes at the same time when they will implement a foreign curriculum (French, English, or international) in a school.

==== Goals ====
The Lebanese curriculum aims at developing the individual on:

- Citizenship
- Intellectual level
- Social level
- National level

=== Kindergarten ===
Students at this stage are subject to experience diverse outcomes throughout their learning journey. They get accustomed to facing this gradual transitional period from being at home into the classroom environment. Also, they build a physiological, motor, emotional and intellectual competencies needed for his development. During this stage, the child develops his physical abilities that enable him to manage his body parts, coordinate his movements, and enhance his senses. The curriculum states that at this stage kids are encouraged to gain automatic language skills that are reflected in the comprehension, expression and performance skill preparing him to develop the processes of reading and writing. Kids in the kindergarten level are supported to achieve self-confidence, highlight their feelings, and gain independence and take responsibility relevant to their age. Also, at this stage they are aided to enable them to think, understand and acquire through their senses, positive interaction with the surrounding, and by scientific means and methods. It is important to mention that kids will be provided with the appropriate environment to motivate them to communicate with others and express themselves. Developing the spirit of cooperation, systematic pattern reflecting good manners and good behavioral habits are also core goals to be achieved at this stage. More, adapting the children to be part of a group, help them build family and social relationships, and introduce them to primary manifestations of patriotism are added to the list of expected curriculum outcome. Last but not least, kids are encouraged to development positive attitude toward manual work.

== Syrian refugees in Lebanese schools ==
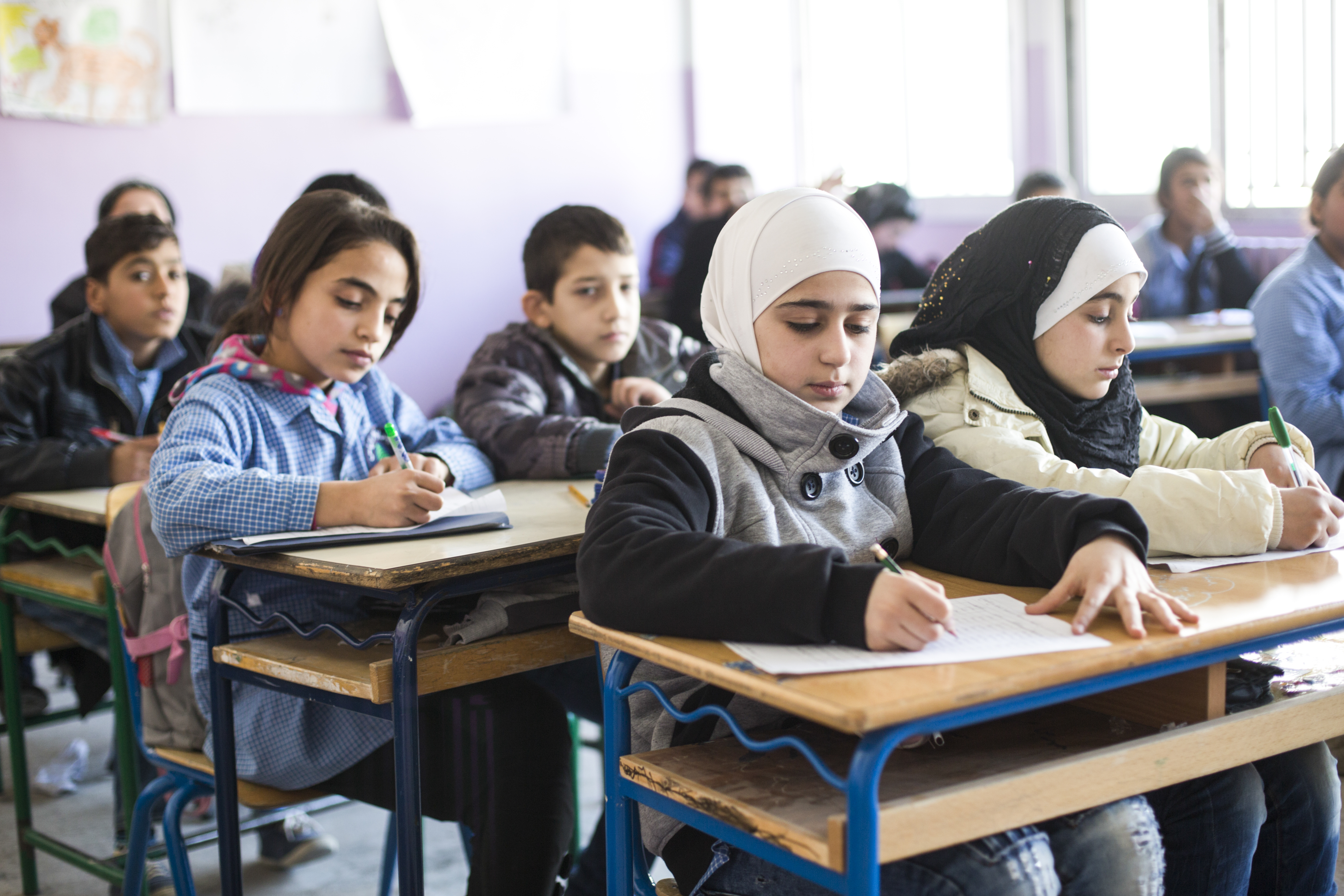
Syrian refugee students, Lebanon, 2016.

The Syrian crisis has placed a large burden on Lebanese public schools. There are nearly 400,000 school-aged refugee children in Lebanon, which is roughly 25% more than the number of Lebanese students in Lebanese public schools. Only an estimated 30% of the Syrian refugee school-aged children are receiving an education. In addition to barriers to access and other challenges, a significant barrier to integration is language: Syrian schools are taught in Arabic, while Lebanese public schools incorporate both French and English. In 2014, 104,000 Syrian refugee students were taught in Lebanese schools. In 2015, the Ministry of Education aimed to double the number of Syrian children in public schools to 200,000 students.

== See also ==
- List of universities in Lebanon

== Bibliography ==
- Akar, Bassel (2 May 2019). Citizenship Education in Conflict-Affected Areas: Lebanon and Beyond. Bloomsbury Publishing. ISBN 978-1-4742-9838-4.
- Abdul-Hamid, Husein; Yassine, Mohamed (18 March 2020). Political Economy of Education in Lebanon: Research for Results Program. World Bank Publications. ISBN 978-1-4648-1546-1.
