= Angelyne (disambiguation) =

Angelyne (real name Ronia Tamar Goldberg, born 1950) is an American celebrity, model, entertainer.

Angelyne may also refer to:

== People and characters ==
- Angelyne Cilvender Toh, a beauty pageant contestant prize winner from Miss World Malaysia 2012

=== Fictional characters ===
- Angelyne, a fictional character from the film Three Men and a Baby
- Angelyne, a fictional character from the TV show Futurama; see Bender (Futurama)
- Angelyne, a fictional character from the TV show Maximum Bob

== Music ==
- Angelyne (album), a 1982 album by Angelyne
- "Angelyne", a 1981 song by Gary U.S. Bonds and Bruce Springsteen, from the album On the Line (Gary U.S. Bonds album)
- "Angelyne", a 2003 song by The Jayhawks, from the album Rainy Day Music

== Stage and screen ==
- Angelyne (miniseries), a 2022 U.S. TV miniseries about Angelyne
- Angelyne, a 1995 short documentary film about Angelyne directed by Robinson Devor
- Los Angelyne, a 2009 one-woman semi-autobiographical theatre show by Katherine Saltzberg

== See also ==
- Angel (disambiguation)
- Angela (disambiguation)
- Angeline (disambiguation)
- Angelina (disambiguation)
- Angelini (surname)
