= Angeline =

Angeline may refer to:

== Books ==
- Angeline, a novella by Émile Zola published in 1898
- Angeline Fowl, fictional character from the Artemis Fowl series
- Someday Angeline, a children's novel by Louis Sachar

== Music ==
=== Songs ===
- "Angeline" (Groove Coverage song), 2011
- "Angeline" (Sean Hogan song), 2000
- "Angeline", by Elton John from the album Leather Jackets, 1986
- "Angeline", by Jamiroquai, from the album Rock Dust Light Star, 2010
- "Angeline", by John Martyn, 1986
- "Angeline", by Jonathan Fagerlund, from the album Flying, 2008
- "Angeline", by New World, 1970

=== Albums ===
- Angeline Quinto (album), by Filipino singer Angeline Quinto

== People ==
- Princess Angeline (c. 1820–1896), born Kikisoblu, daughter of Chief Seattle
- Angeline Armstrong, Australian singer, songwriter, guitarist, and the frontwoman of Telenova
- Angeline Ball (born 1969), Irish actress
- Angelines Fernández (1922–1994), Spanish-born actress of Mexican film and television
- Angeline Fuller Fischer (1841–1925), American writer
- Angeline Greensill (born 1948), Māori political rights campaigner, academic and leader
- Angeline Makore, Zimbabwean activist and human rights advocate
- Angeline Malik, Pakistani director and actress
- Mary Angeline Teresa McCrory, née Bridget Teresa McCrory (1893–1984), Roman Catholic nun and advocate for the impoverished elderly
- Angeline Morrison, British multi-instrumentalist musician and songwriter
- Angeline Quinto (born 1989), Filipino singer
- Angeline Stickney (1830–1892), American suffragist, abolitionist, and mathematician
- Cary Angeline (born 1997), American football player

== Other uses ==
- Angeline Falls, a waterfall in King County, Washington, US
- Angeline (Heartbreak High) episode from the new Heartbreak High

== See also ==
- Angelyne (disambiguation)
- Angelina (disambiguation)
- Angelini (surname)
- Angela (disambiguation)
- Angel (disambiguation)
