= Angelino =

Angelino is the masculine given name of:

- Angelino Alfano (born 1970), Italian politician
- Angelino Apelar (1927–2006), Evangelical Christian leader
- Angelino Dulcert (fl. 1339), Italian-Majorcan cartographer
- Angelino Fons (1936–2011), Spanish film director and screenwriter
- Angelino Garzón (born 1946), former Vice President of Colombia
- Angelino Medoro (1567–1631), Italian painter, active in Latin America
- Angelino Rosa (1948–2009), Italian footballer
- Angelino Soler (born 1939), Spanish road bicycle racer

== See also ==
- Theodoros Angelinos (born 1984), Greek tennis player
- Angeleno, a resident of Los Angeles
