= Eichhorst (surname) =

Eichhorst is a surname. Notable people with the name include:

- Angelina Eichhorst, Dutch diplomat
- Anja Eichhorst (born c. 1971), German swimmer
- Franz Eichhorst (1885–1948), German painter
- Hermann Eichhorst (1849–1921), German-Swiss internist
- Rich Eichhorst (born 1933), American basketball player and sports official
