= Constantino Acosta Dávila =

Mexican politician

- Born: 12 August 1972 (age 53); State of Mexico, Mexico
- Occupation: Politician
- Political party: PAN

Constantino Acosta Dávila (born 12 August 1972) is a Mexican politician affiliated with the National Action Party (PAN). In the 2006 general election he was elected to the Chamber of Deputies to represent the State of Mexico's fourth district during the 60th session of Congress.
