= Raúl Leonel Paredes Vega =

Mexican lawyer and politician

- Born: 9 November 1962 (age 63); State of Mexico, Mexico
- Education: UVM
- Occupations: Lawyer and politician
- Political party: PAN

Raúl Leonel Paredes Vega (born 9 November 1962) is a Mexican lawyer and politician affiliated with the National Action Party (PAN). In the 2003 mid-terms he was elected to the Chamber of Deputies to represent the State of Mexico's fourth district during the 59th session of Congress.
