= Elvia Hernández García =

Mexican politician

- Born: 14 July 1962 (age 63); State of Mexico, Mexico
- Occupation: Politician
- Political party: PRI

Elvia Hernández García (born 14 July 1962) is a Mexican politician from the Institutional Revolutionary Party (PRI). In the 2009 mid-terms she was elected to the Chamber of Deputies to represent the State of Mexico's fourth district during the 61st session of Congress.
