= 4th federal electoral district of the State of Mexico =

Federal electoral district of Mexico

State of Mexico's 4th
- Electoral district of the Chamber of Deputies of Mexico

- 4th district since 2023

Incumbent
- Member: Melva Carrasco Godínez
- Party: ▌Morena
- Congress: 66th (2024–2027)

District
- State: State of Mexico
- Head town: Ciudad Nicolás Romero
- Coordinates: 19°37′N 99°20′W
- Covers: Nicolás Romero
- PR region: Fifth
- Precincts: 104
- Population: 429,486 (2020 census)

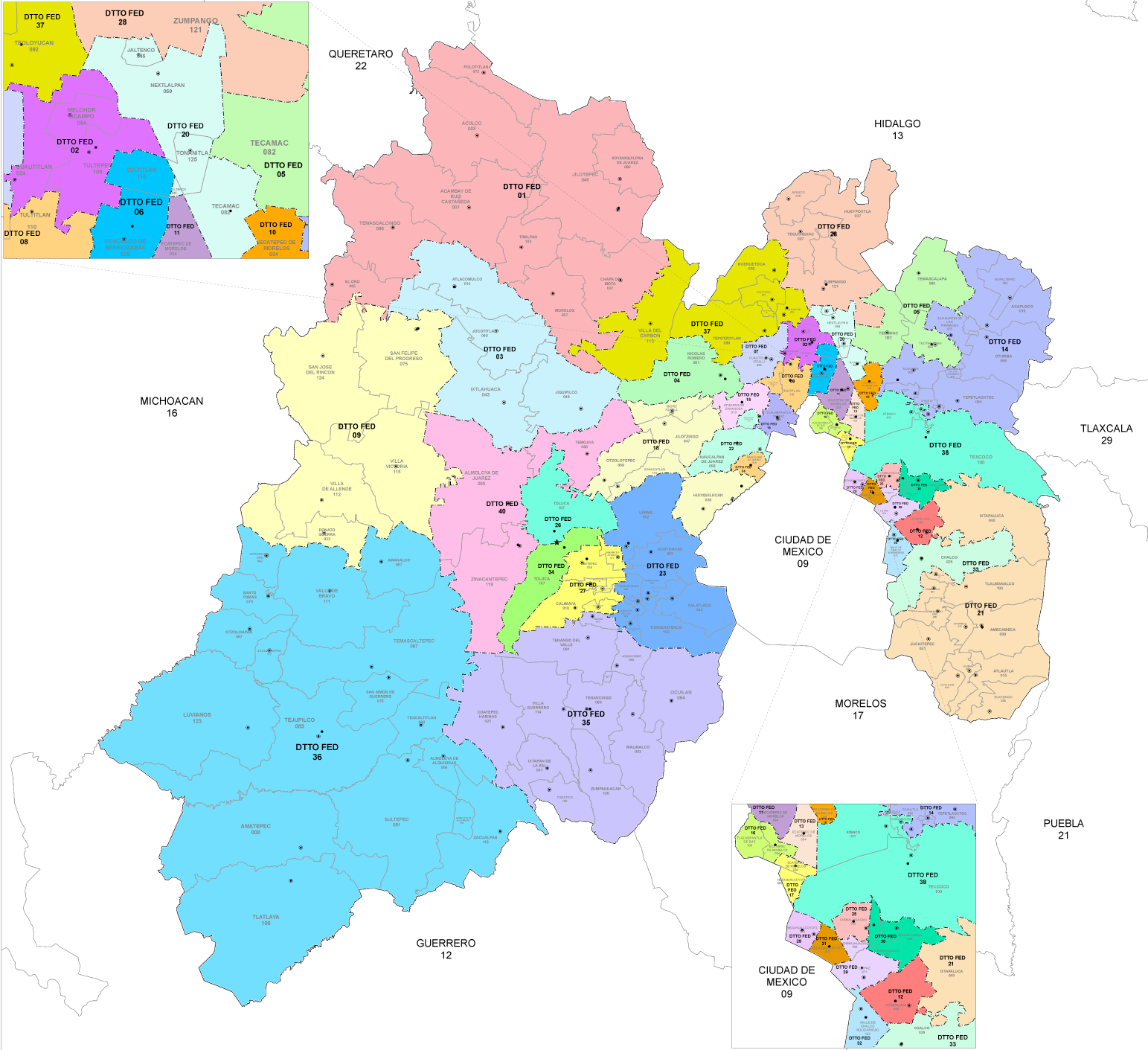
Federal electoral districts of the State of Mexico since 2023

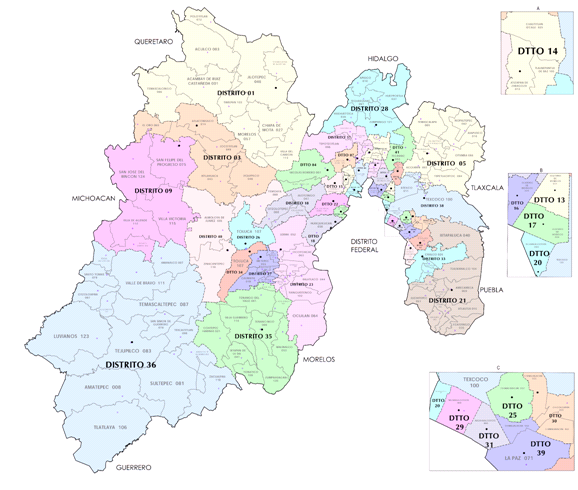
2017–2022 districting scheme

The 4th federal electoral district of the State of Mexico (Spanish: Distrito electoral federal 04 del Estado de México) is one of the 300 electoral districts into which Mexico is divided for elections to the federal Chamber of Deputies and one of 40 such districts in the State of Mexico.

It elects one deputy to the lower house of Congress for each three-year legislative session by means of the first-past-the-post system. Votes cast in the district also count towards the calculation of proportional representation ("plurinominal") deputies elected from the fifth region.

The current member for the district, elected in the 2024 general election, is Melva Carrasco Godínez of the National Regeneration Movement (Morena).

== District territory ==
Under the 2023 districting plan adopted by the National Electoral Institute (INE), which is to be used for the 2024, 2027 and 2030 federal elections, the 4th district covers 104 electoral precincts (secciones electorales) in one municipality in the Greater Mexico City urban area:

- Nicolás Romero.

The head town (cabecera distrital), where results from individual polling stations are gathered together and tallied, is Ciudad Nicolás Romero, the municipal seat. In the 2020 census, the district reported a total population of 429,486.

== Previous districting schemes ==
Evolution of electoral district numbers
	1974	1978	1996	2005	2017	2023
State of Mexico	15	34	36	40	41	40
Chamber of Deputies	196	300				

Under the previous districting plans enacted by the INE and its predecessors, the 4th district was situated as follows:

2017–2022

The municipalities of Isidro Fabela and Nicolás Romero. The head town was at Ciudad Nicolás Romero.

2005–2017

The municipality of Nicolás Romero and the western half of Cuautitlán Izcalli; the rest of the municipality was in the 7th district. The head town was at Ciudad Nicolás Romero.

1996–2005

The municipalities of Chapa de Mota, Nicolás Romero, Tepotzotlán and Villa del Carbón. The head town was at Ciudad Nicolás Romero.

1978–1996

A portion of the city of Toluca.

== Deputies returned to Congress ==
(Mexico) National parties
- Current
- PAN
- PRI
- PT
- PVEM
- MC
- Morena
- PAZ
- Somos
- Defunct or local only
- PLM
- PNR
- PRM
- PNM
- PP
- PPS
- PARM
- PFCRN
- CON
- PANAL
- PSD
- PES
- PES
- PRD

State of Mexico's 4th district
Election	Deputy	Party	Term	Legislature
1916	Guillermo Ordórica		1916–1917	Constituent Congress of Querétaro
...
1979	José Merino Mañón	Institutional Revolutionary Party	1979–1982	51st Congress
1982	Irma Zárate Pineda	Institutional Revolutionary Party	1982–1985	52nd Congress
1985	Laura Pavón Jaramillo	Institutional Revolutionary Party	1985–1988	53rd Congress
1988	Agustín Gasca Pliego	Institutional Revolutionary Party	1988–1991	54th Congress
1991	Laura Pavón Jaramillo	Institutional Revolutionary Party	1991–1994	55th Congress
1994	Manuel Hinojosa Juárez	Institutional Revolutionary Party	1994–1997	56th Congress
1997	Fernando Castro Suárez	Institutional Revolutionary Party	1997–2000	57th Congress
2000	Rafael Barrón Romero	National Action Party (Mexico)	2000–2003	58th Congress
2003	Raúl Leonel Paredes Vega	National Action Party (Mexico)	2003–2006	59th Congress
2006	Constantino Acosta Dávila	National Action Party (Mexico)	2006–2009	60th Congress
2009	Elvia Hernández García	Institutional Revolutionary Party	2009–2012	61st Congress
2012	Angelina Carreño Mijares	Institutional Revolutionary Party	2012–2015	62nd Congress
2015	María Monserrath Sobreyra Santos	Institutional Revolutionary Party	2015–2018	63rd Congress
2018	Nelly Carrasco Godínez	National Regeneration Movement	2018–2021	64th Congress
2021	Nelly Carrasco Godínez	National Regeneration Movement	2021–2024	65th Congress
2024	Melva Carrasco Godínez	National Regeneration Movement	2024–2027	66th Congress

== Presidential elections ==
State of Mexico's 4th district
Election	District won by	Party or coalition	%
2018	Andrés Manuel López Obrador	Juntos Haremos Historia	56.6249
2024	Claudia Sheinbaum Pardo	Sigamos Haciendo Historia	64.3921
