= Angeline Makore =

Zimbabwean activist and human rights advocate

- Education: University of South Africa
- Occupations: child activist, human rights activist, women's rights activist, HIV/AIDS activist
- Organization: Spark R.E.A.D
- Known for: campaigning against child marriage in Zimbabwe

Angeline Rungano Makore also known as either Angeline Makore or Angel Makore is a Zimbabwean women's and girls rights activist. She is well known for advocating about ending Child marriage in Zimbabwe. She currently runs Spark R.E.A.D, a NGO which was founded to empower girls and women in Zimbabwe. She is also a member of Girls Not Brides organization. She is regarded as one of the prominent young African women activists and changemakers.

== Biography ==
Angeline was born and raised up in rural areas of Zimbabwe. Being a child, she endured child abuse being a victim of child marriage as she was forced to be nearly married at the age of 14. She was nearly forced to become the second wife of her brother-in-law. She refused the marriage and since then went onto campaign in order to end child marriages.

== Career ==
She pursued Bachelor of Science degree in Psychology and diploma in law from the University of South Africa.

She became a human rights activist especially on empowering girls and women's rights in Zimbabwe. She also worked as a volunteer in various other non profit organisations such as Girl Child Network Zimbabwe and Young Women Christian Association Zimbabwe. In 2012, she founded the Spark R.E.A.D (Resilience, Empowerment, Activism and Development) for girls and women with the core objectives of ending sexual abuse and violence against women and also to address the issues regarding adolescent health issues faced by girls.

She also served as an ambassador to the International Student Festival in Trondheim. In 2017, she was chosen as one of the members of the Peer to Peer Evaluating Judging Panel for Johnson & Johnson's GenH Challenge.
