= Angelina Virginia Winkler =

American journalist

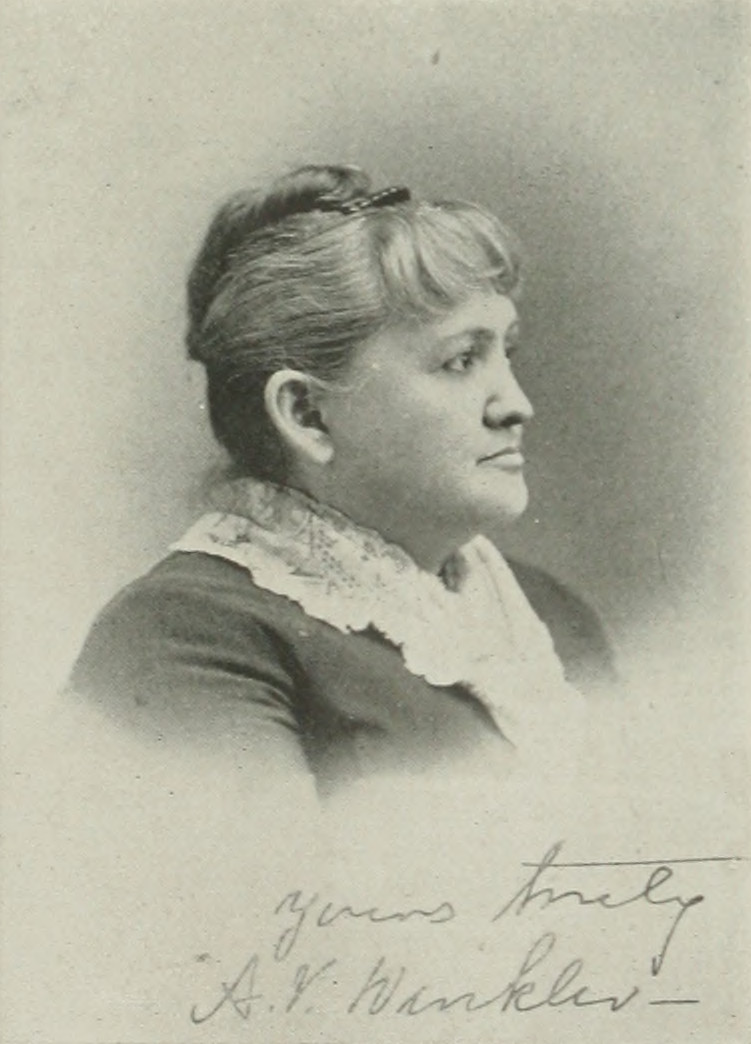
- Angelina Virginia Winkler, "A woman of the century"
- Born: Angelina Virginia Smith; June 2, 1842; Richmond, Virginia
- Died: May 4, 1911 (aged 68)
- Occupations: Journalist; editor; magazine publisher

Angelina Virginia Winkler (née Smith; June 2, 1842 – May 4, 1911) was an American journalist, editor, magazine publisher. She specialized in literary criticism of Southern literature.

== Early life and education ==
Angelina Virginia Smith was born in Richmond, Virginia, June 2, 1842. Her father, John Walton Smith, and her mother, Elizabeth (Tate) Smith, were both of English descent. Her father was a direct heir of Lady Mary Hamilton, of Manchester, England. Her mother was the owner of a valuable property containing slaves, inherited from the Tates, of Virginia. At the time of Angelina's birth, her father was a merchant of Richmond, where he spent fifty years of his life, and reared and educated a family. She was educated in the Richmond Female Institute.

== Career ==
When the American Civil War broke upon the South, she devoted herself to the care of the sick, the wounded and the dying soldiers in the hospitals. During those years, she lost her father, mother, a brother and other near relatives. The war swept away her estate, and the parental home was left a ruin, carrying with it valuable papers proving her right to a large estate in England. During the Civil War, she published articles in the Southern Illustrated News.

In June, 1864, she married Lieutenant-Colonel Clinton McKamey Winkler, of the 4th Texas regiment. Mr. Winkler, at the opening of the war, was a prominent lawyer of Corsicana, Texas. After the surrender of Appomattox, Mrs. Winkler, with her husband, went to Corsicana, where they established a new home, and a family grew up around them. Mr. Winkler was absent most of the time, being a member of the Texas State Legislature and a factor in the politics of the State. She spent a portion of each year with him at Austin, Tyler, and Galveston. Called to serve as judge in the Texas Courts of Appeals, after six years of service to his State, he died.

Before her husband's death, Winkler had contributed some popular articles to the Southern Illustrated News and Magnolia, published in Richmond, Virginia, and newspapers and magazines in Texas and other Southern States. During the period of 1882–85, she undertook the publication of a literary magazine, Texas Prairie Flower. She was a member of the Texas Press Association. She was appointed honorary commissioner for her State to the World Cotton Centennial in New Orleans, and organized associations for work in the woman's department of Texas. Her chief work was the preparation of a historical work, entitled The Confederate Capital, and Hood's Texas Brigade. From 1889 till 1893, she served as associate editor and business manager of the Round Table, a monthly magazine of literary miscellany, published in Texas.

== Personal life and legacy ==
The Winklers had six children. Mr. Winkler died in 1882.

In 1903, Mrs. Winkler came to El Paso, Texas, and later effected the organization of the Robert E. Lee chapter of the United Daughters of the Confederacy. She died in 1911 and was interred in El Paso.
