= Castle of Montegiove =

Castle in Umbria, Italy

Coordinates: 42.918°N 12.144°E

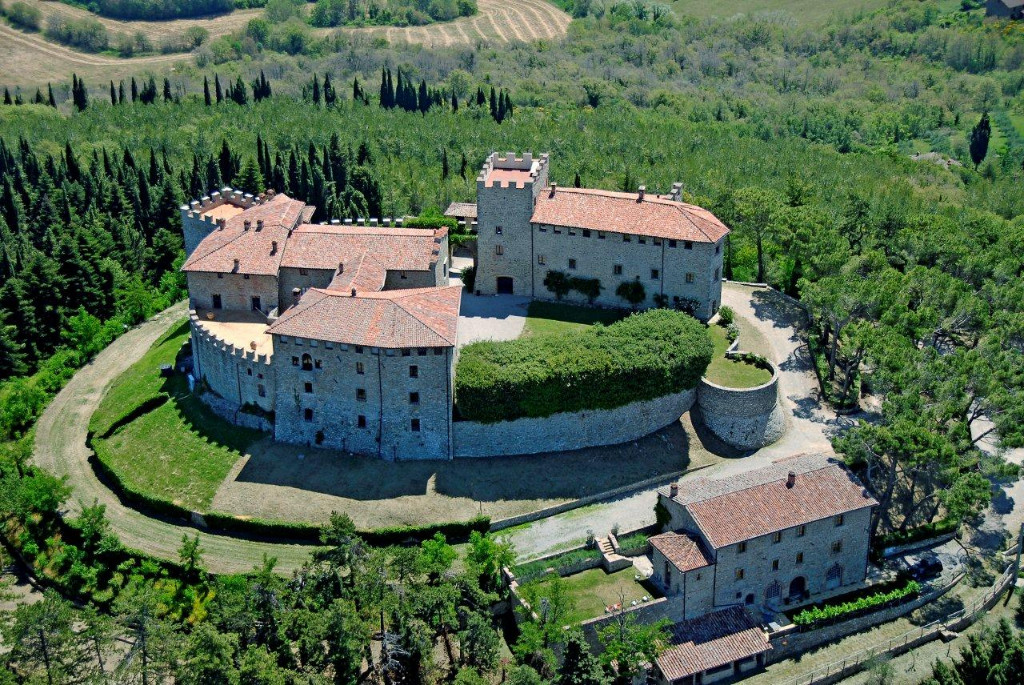
Castello di Montegiove, near Orvieto in Umbria

Castello di Montegiove was established in the 13th century in Umbria, Italy. It lies at 627 meters above sea-level, on the border between the old city states of Orvieto and Perugia. The castle, known as La Scarzuola, continues to operate privately as a family farm and tourist site.

== Early history ==
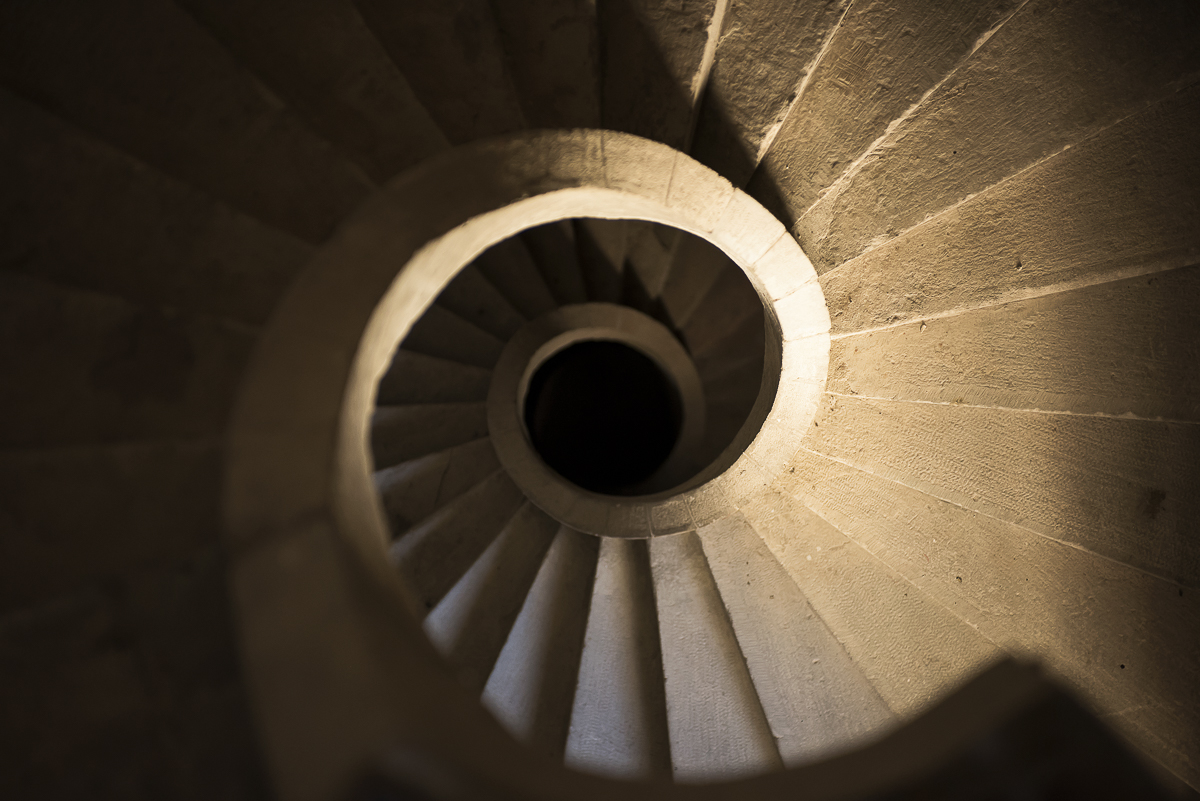
Winding staircase in the castle

The castle was founded by the Bulgarelli, Counts of Marsciano, during the 13th century on the ruins of an old temple dedicated to Iuppiter Elicius (Jupiter), hence its name, Montegiove. The exact year in which the castle was founded is uncertain, although it certainly existed in 1282, as documents show that in that year a request was issued for the construction of an oratory on the estate of the Castle of Monte Giove, which was granted and nowadays is known as La Scarzuola.

Ownership of the castle changed hands more than once over the centuries amidst battles and feuds, in 1780 it became of ownership of the Misciattelli family, and it has been in their family ever since.*Official website

The birthplace of Blessed Angelina Marsciano (1377-1435) of the Third Order of Saint Francis.

== Modern history ==
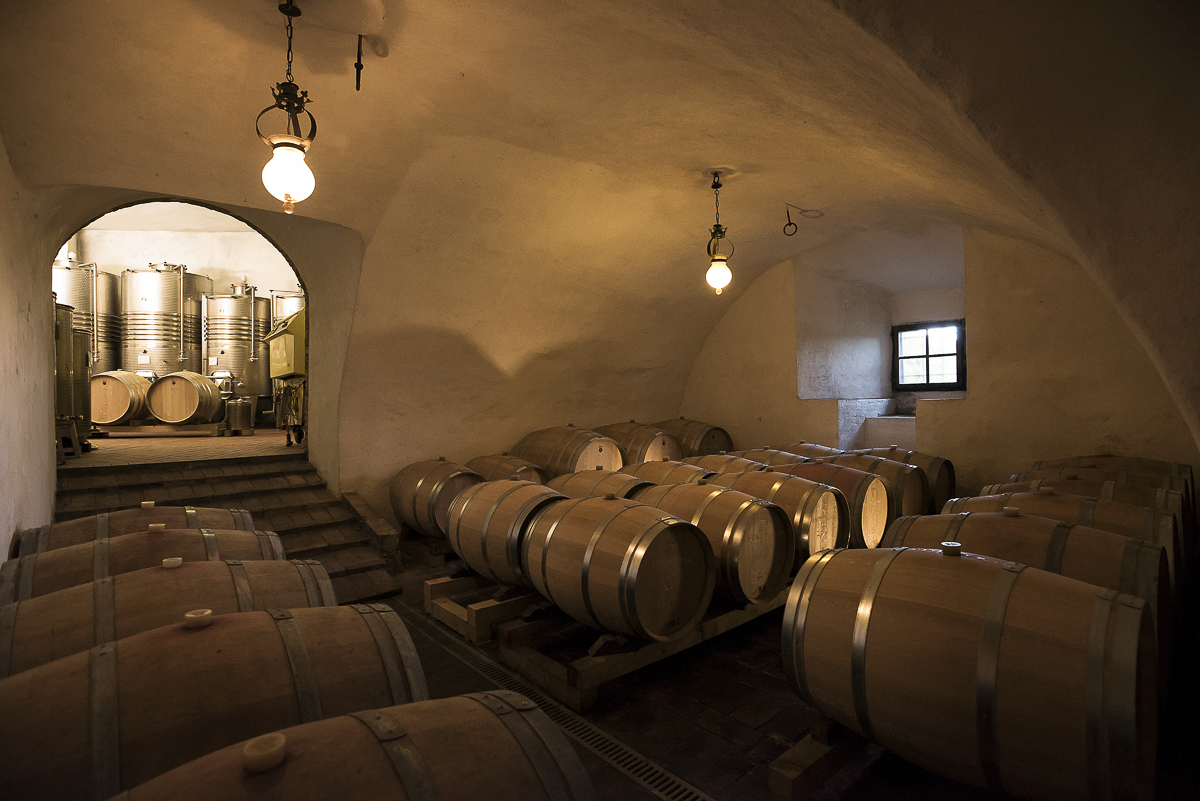
The castle's wine cellars

Still a family-run farm today, the estate covers nearly 1200 hectares of land, covered with olive groves, woods, pastures and vineyards. The principal products of the estate are Orvietano Rosso d.o.c. and Umbria rosso i.g.t wines, extra-virgin olive oil, as well as truffles as the estate has a truffle reserve where two species can be found, the scorzone and uncinato. On the estate's pastures the free range Chianina cattle, the white cows so typical of the area.*Official website

The Castello di Montegiove is private property and is open for cellar tours and wine tastings upon reservation.
