= Angelino Rosa =

Italian footballer (1948-2009)

Personal information
- Date of birth: March 29, 1948
- Place of birth: Venice, Italy
- Date of death: January 11, 2009 (aged 60)
- Place of death: Venice, Italy
- Height: 1.73 m (5 ft 8 in)
- Position: Defender

Senior career*
Years	Team	Apps	(Gls)
1965–1969	Matera	128	(2)
1969–1970	Ternana	37	(0)
1970–1971	Roma	3	(0)
1971–1977	Ternana	181	(9)
1977–1981	Venezia		
- * Club domestic league appearances and goals

Angelino Rosa (1948–2009) was an Italian professional football player.

He played 3 seasons (59 games, 2 goals) in the Serie A for A.S. Roma and Ternana Calcio.

His has the fifth-most appearances for Ternana Calcio in all leagues and second-most appearances in Serie A .
