= City Gala =

The City Gala is an annual speaker summit, award show, and fundraising event founded by Ryan Long often held on the evening of the Grammy Awards or the Academy Awards. The ceremony honors the most successful people in various industries, including science, entertainment, business, and philanthropy. The City Gala's purpose is to support and raise awareness about solving the world's global grand challenges. The Gala's purpose is to work with startup non-profit charitable organizations.

== 2018 ==
The 2018 City Gala was announced in November 2017 and will be taking place on the evening of the 90th Academy Awards at Universal Studios in Hollywood, California. The keynote speaker will be actor, businessman, philanthropist, and co-founder of the Thorn Foundation, Ashton Kutcher. In February, the City Gala announced that Matthew McConaughey will be the inspiration award honoree. Matthew McConaughey is the founder of the charitable foundation, Just Keep Livin. Additionally, a previously featured speaker Freddy Behin spoke about integrity in life and business, specifically when involved in charitable environments.

== 2017 ==
The 2017 City Gala was announced in February 2017 and will take place on the evening of the 59th Annual Grammy Awards at the Walt Disney Concert Hall. The guest speaker will be featuring Freddy Behin, as well as John Travolta. Jeff Timmons, of the Grammy-nominated pop group 98 Degrees will serve as the City Gala 2017 emcee, and best selling author and business conference leader Greg Reid will moderate the event. The keynote speaker will be hip hop music legend Russell Simmons who will also be one of the honorees. The 2017 event is supporting the International Arts & Philanthropy Foundation (IAP), which provides funding in support of arts, education, early childhood development, and the Breed Life program which supports and facilitates the gift of life through live organ donation.

== 2016 ==
The 2016 City Gala was announced in January 2016 and will take place on the evening of the 58th Annual Grammy Awards at the Playboy Mansion. The keynote speaker will be entrepreneur tycoon Richard Branson who will also be one of the honorees. Other honorees announced for the evening include entrepreneur John Paul DeJoria and astronaut Buzz Aldrin. The event will be hosted by former 98 Degrees member Jeff Timmons.

=== Previous Gala ===
The first reported City Gala took place on the night of the 86th Academy Awards in 2014. The ceremony featured a keynote speech from director James Cameron. Notable honorees included Charlize Theron, Sean Penn, and Halle Berry with music from Ne-Yo and Paris Hilton. Other confirmed attendees included Tyrese Gibson, Zendaya, and Gene Simmons.
