= Lieve Fransen =

Director for Social Policies and strategy 2020 for growth and competitiveness at DG Employment and Social affairs of the European Commission

Personal details
- Born: April 17, 1950 Gent, Belgium
- Spouse: Noah Howard
- Education: University of Ghent for MD and university of Antwerp for PHD, Belgium; Institute of Tropical Medicine Antwerp, Belgium; Ghent University, Belgium
- Website: ec.europa.eu/represent_en.htm DG Communication Website

Lieve Fransen is a senior adviser to the European Policy Centre on health, social and migration policies, and published studies on investing in social infrastructure, energy poverty and social investment. Between 2011 and 2015 she was the social policies director in the Directorate for Employment and Social affairs for the European Commissionin charge of social policies, poverty eradication, pensions, health and social protection. Before that she was director for communication and representations in the EC's communication directorate for more than 500 networks across the European Union and from 1987 till 1997 she was head of unit for human development in the European Commissions department for development.

== Career ==
Fransen started her career as a physician in Africa during the 1970s and 1980s (mainly in Mozambique, Kenya and Rwanda), with a particular interest in public health, infectious diseases and sexually transmitted infections. In several African countries she developed new initiatives and ensured implementation through international cooperation and strategic planning. In 1987, the European Commission hired Fransen as a consultant from the Institute of Tropical Medicine Antwerp to survey blood transfusion and HIV seropositive rates in Uganda. This led the European Commission in 1987 to help Uganda set up a safe blood supply, and then to create the AIDS Task Force, an international foundation of which Fransen was the founding executive director. In 2000, giving evidence to the UK House of Commons International Development Committee, Jeff O' Malley, the founding director of the International HIV/AIDS Alliance, referred to Fransen as "the EC's HIV/AIDS expert".

In 1993 she joined the European Commission as the Head of the Health, AIDS and Population Sector. Glenys Kinnock MEP noted that, following Fransen's appointment to the EC in 1987, spending on the EC's Health, HIV/AIDS and population programmes "had increased from 1 per cent of EC aid in 1986 to more than 8 per cent in 1998". Fransen was in charge of negotiating tiered pricing for pharmaceutical products for developing countries; by 2002, however, she saw the debate on tiered pricing as becoming too difficult and too legalistic, and believed that more needed to be done to ensure access to medicines at cheaper prices in developing countries than in the West. During this period, she was also guest editor for the World Bank's policy research department. In 2001 she became head of the social and human development unit at the EC's Directorate-General for International Cooperation and Development, in charge of social protection, employment, health, education and gender.

She was a founding board member and board vice-chair of the Global Fund to fight AIDS, Tuberculosis and Malaria (GFATM), representing the European Commission and several EU member states from 2000 to 2007, where she helped create a large public/private partnership and performance-based fund, which approved around $7 billion in grants over four years.

After leaving the EU in 2015, she became a senior policy advisor for the think tank, the European Policy Center or EPC and started working as a senior advisor for the Royal Philips health technology company in the Netherlands and in Africa. She helped guide the transformation of the company towards contributing to the sustainable development goals or SDGs. She organised a conference during UNGA in New York for the private sector to spearhead transformations towards the SDGs and helped set up the SDG platform in Kenya.

In 2016-2017 she coordinated an expert group for the task force chaired by President Prodi to catalyse investments in social infrastructure in the EU. With the emergence of the Corona virus in 2020 she wrote and mobilised about the need to invest in manufacturing capacities for vaccines and other pharma products in Africa and Europe and the opportunity to increase resilience through a real partnership. She also contributed to the debate about Democracy and COVID-19. In 2020 she co created the platform for transformative technologies to contribute to reach the SDGs and climate goals (P4TT.org) and became a senior partner in the organisation.

== Education ==
Fransen holds a PhD from the University of Antwerp in social policies and public health.

== Works ==
Fransen has written more than 100 peer-reviewed publications and numerous policy documents for the European Council and the European Parliament including:

- Reproductive Tract Infections in Mozambique: A Case Study of Integrated Services, Rui Bastos dos Santos, Elena Maria Pereira Folgosa, Lieve Fransen in Reproductive Tract Infections: Global Impact and Priorities for Women’s Reproductive Health (1992) Plenum Press ISBN 9780306442414
- Confronting AIDS: Evidence from the Developing World Martha Ainsworth, Lieve Fransen, Mead Over (eds.) (1998) European Commission ISBN 9789282849910
- Social Investment for a Cohesive and Competitive European Union, Evelyn Astor, Lieve Fransen, Marc Vothknecht in The Uses of Social Investment (2017) Oxford University Press ISBN 9780198790495.
- Boosting social infrastructure investment by Lieve Fransen and Edoardo Reviglio. 2017

== Recognition ==
She was awarded Senegal's National Order of the Lion (1999) for special merit in the fight against HIV/AIDS and she received the Jonathan Mann Award for Health and Human Rights (2001). She was awarded a lifetime achievement award in 2003 in India for het health and human rights work.
