= Angelina Carreño Mijares =

Mexican politician

- Born: Federal District, Mexico
- Occupation: Politician
- Political party: PRI

Angelina Carreño Mijares (Spanish pronunciation: [aŋxeˈlina kaˈreɲo ˈmixaɾes]) is a Mexican politician affiliated with the Institutional Revolutionary Party (PRI). In the 2012 general election she was elected to the Chamber of Deputies to represent the State of Mexico's fourth district during the 62nd session of Congress.
