= Arnaldo Maria Angelini =

Italian engineer (1909–1999)

Arnaldo Maria Angelini (1909–1999) was an Italian engineer and Professor of Electrotechnics at the Sapienza University of Rome, known for contributions in the development of nuclear generating stations as well as hydro and pumped hydro stations, and the improvement of Italy's transmission and distribution systems.

== Biography ==
Angelini in 1930 graduated at the Sapienza University of Rome, where he continued to do postgraduate work for some time. He started his academic career at the Polytechnic University of Turin as lecturer. In 1949 he was appointed Professor of electrical-machine construction at the Sapienza University of Rome, where he directed the postgraduate courses. and founded the postlauream course in nuclear engineering. He was elected member of the Accademia dei Lincei.

Early 1960s he moved to industry. He worked for ENEL from 1963 to 1979 as general director and then president.

In 1976 Angelini was received elected Honorary President and Consultant by the National Academy of Engineering for his "contributions in the development of nuclear generating stations as well as hydro and pumped hydro stations, and the improvement of Italy's transmission and distribution systems." He also received IEEE Simon Ramo Medal in 1986 and the IEEE Ernst Weber Engineering Leadership Award in 1989.

== Selected publications ==
Angelini authored and co-authored many publications in his field of expertise. Books, a selection:

- Electricity and the Environment. 1973
- Of Electric Power Transmission, the Evolution and the Environment. 1974
- The Utilization of Hydraulic Resources Still Available in the World. U.S. National Committee of the World Energy Conference, 1974

Articles, a selection:

- Angelini, Arnaldo Maria. Nuclear power stations in Italy. No. A/CONF. 28/P/550. Italy. Ente Nazionale per l'Energia Elettrica, Rome, 1964.
- Angelini, Arnaldo. "Uncertainties in the Future of Energy." Annals of the New York Academy of Sciences 610.1 (1990): 121-128.
- Angelini, A. M. "A note on the role of system engineering in the industry of a changing society." Technology in Society 18.4 (1996): 461-466.

Primary Contributor:

- Cost Estimate Classification System - As applied in EPC for the Nuclear Power Industries. AACE International Recommended Practice 115R-21, 2022
