= Angelina Gualdoni =

American painter

- Born: 1975 (age 50–51); San Francisco, California, U.S.
- Education: University of Illinois Chicago; Maryland Institute College of Art; Sam Fox School of Design & Visual Arts
- Known for: Painting

Angelina Gualdoni (born 1975 in San Francisco, US) is an artist based in New York.

Gualdoni attended Washington University in St. Louis, School of Art (now known as the Sam Fox School of Design & Visual Arts) from 1993 to 1995. She received her BFA from Maryland Institute College of Art, Baltimore, in 1997 and her MFA in 2000 from the University of Illinois at Chicago.

Angelina Gualdoni begins her paintings by pouring directly onto the canvas. This drawing via liquid creates a capricious and unpredictable ground and forms a base, both in terms of material and narrative. After one or often several layered pours, Gualdoni adds markings in heavier paint over top, defining objects or spaces. Constant tensions of emptiness and being, object and field, movement and stasis permeate her work. Gualdoni's earlier series investigated failed utopias of Modern architecture, and her current work extracts the essence of this decay by leaving the viewer to question what is coming into being and what is falling apart.

She is represented by Asya Geisberg Gallery in New York.

== Solo exhibitions ==
Saint Louis Art Museum

Museum of Contemporary Art, Chicago

Asya Geisberg Gallery, New York

Kavi Gupta, Chicago

Galeria Senda, Barcelona

Museum de Paviljoens, the Netherlands

Momentum Gallery, Berlin.

== Grants and Fellowships ==
She is a recipient of a Pollock Krasner Grant, a New York Foundation for the Arts Grant, and The Freund Fellowship from the Saint Louis Art Museum.
