= Angelina, Santa Catarina =

Coordinates: 27°35′S 48°59′W

- Municipality
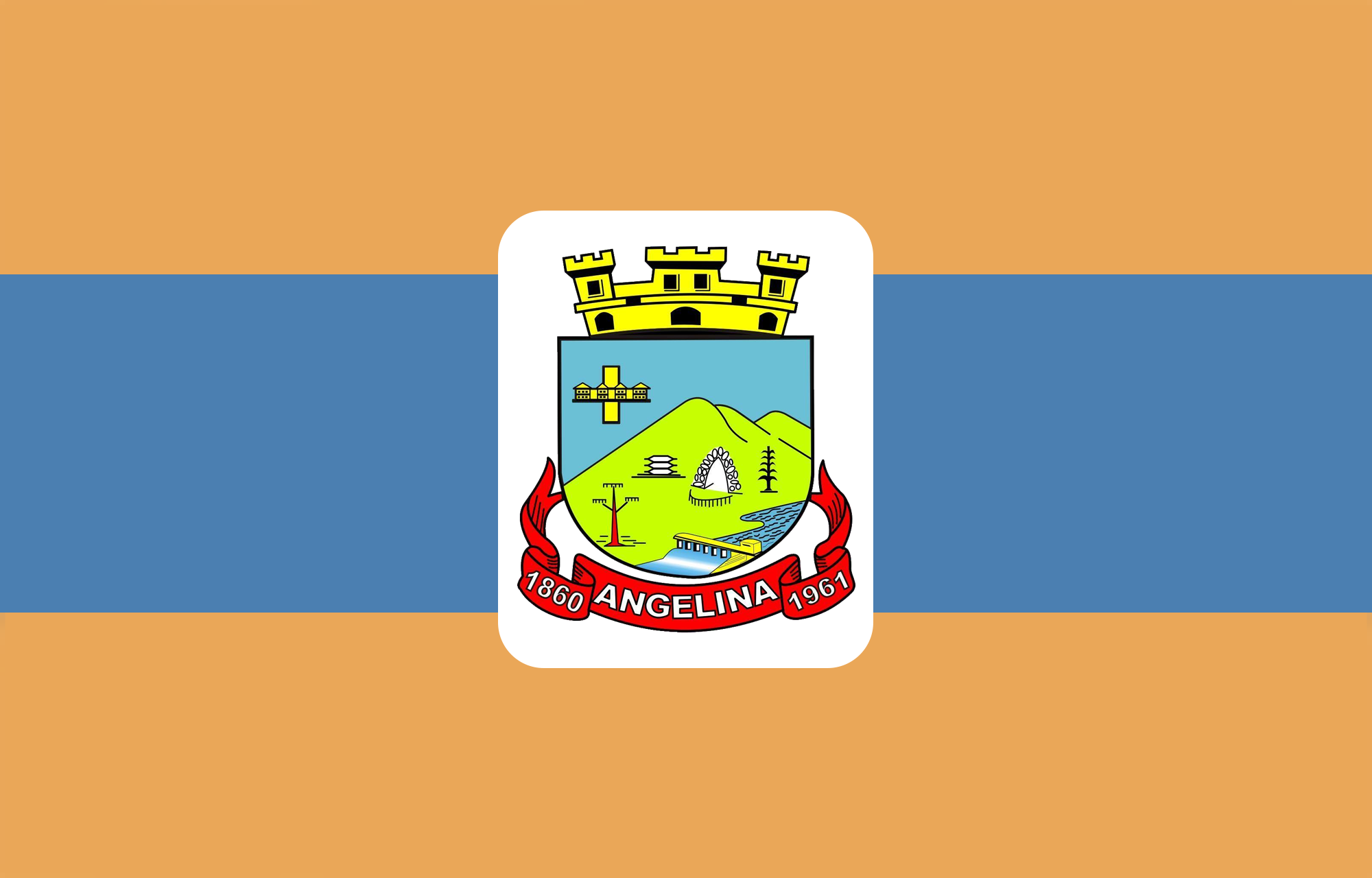
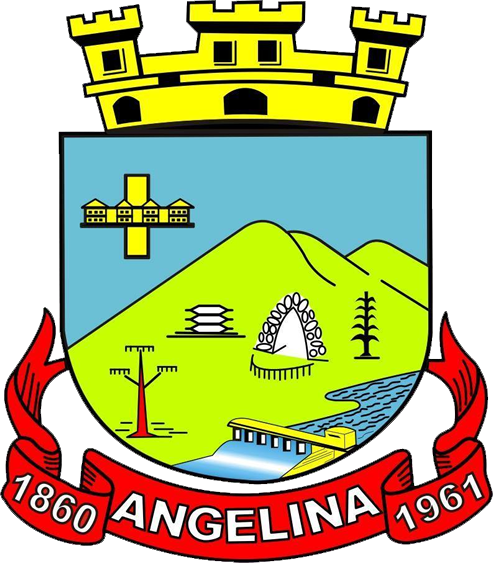
- Flag Coat of arms
- Interactive map of Angelina, Santa Catarina
- Country: Brazil
- Region: South
- State: Santa Catarina
- Mesoregion: Grande Florianópolis

Population (2020)
  - Total: 4,743
- Time zone: UTC−3 (BRT)
- Website: www.angelina.sc.gov.br

Angelina, Santa Catarina is a municipality in the state of Santa Catarina in the South region of Brazil.

== See also ==
- List of municipalities in Santa Catarina
