= Fame and Philanthropy =

2014 charitable fundraising event at the 86th Academy Awards

- Date: Evening of the 86th Academy Awards, March 2, 2014
- Location: Beverly Hills, California. Hollywood, California
- Organized by: Fame & Philanthropy, LLC.
- Participants: Ryan Long, executive producer Chandra Stovall; Kuo Yang; Anthony Angelini

Fame & Philanthropy was a charitable fundraising event that took place on the evening of the 86th Academy Awards, March 2, 2014. Attendees of the event range from high-profile celebrities to leaders in business, entertainment, and politics. The fundraising event, first presented in 2014 at The Vineyard in Beverly Hills, featured a keynote speech from Academy Award-winning director James Cameron, and was attended by actresses Charlize Theron and Halle Berry.

The event was founded and produced by Ryan Long through Fame and Philanthropy LLC. The event's primary purpose was to raise money and awareness for various charities including Community Inspiring Today's Youth (CITY), Charlize Theron Africa Outreach Project, The Compound Foundation, and several others. It was a showcase of Hollywood talent and one of several parties during the week of the Academy Awards with high media presence.

James Cameron, who delivered the keynote address, spoke actively about the various charities involved in the event. His address also praised the Oscar nominated films of the year and gave an insider view of the technicalities involved in film-making. A variety of celebrities were in attendance, including

- Grammy Award winner Ne-Yo
- Halle Berry
- Charlize Theron
- Sean Penn
- Paris Hilton
- Zendaya
- Stafford Brothers

Following Cameron's speech, there was a headlining performance by Ne-yo, with Paris Hilton's and The Stafford Brother's DJ set concluding the night and after party. The event was generally well accepted by critics.
