= Anthony Angelini =

American entrepreneur

Anthony Alexander Angelini (born October 24, 1994), is an American entrepreneur, event producer, and humanitarian. He gained distinction for his involvement in charitable events in the Southern California area, and through his family business Angelini Trading Company.

== Life and career ==
=== Early life ===
Anthony Angelini was born and raised in Westlake Village and attended Westlake High School where he was a singer in the choir and a member of the theater department. His mother, Stephanie Wilson, is a long-standing member of the Thousand Oaks Cultural Affairs Commission and often encouraged him to make public speeches to City Council. His father, Richard Angelini, is an entrepreneur and lawyer, and the founder of Angelini Trading Company.

=== Early career ===
In high school, along with his best friend, he founded the event production company, A&A Productions, which would later become Angelini Entertainment, his current company.

Angelini would use A&A Productions as the production company for several charity events in the Thousand Oaks area during his high school career, including a moustache completion hosted by Ventura County local Mickey Jones, and a rock concert in a church to raise money for animal rescue.

Angelini claims that he has been producing rock concerts in his backyard since the age of 12.

=== Casting Director ===
Out of high school at 17 years old, Angelini became an intern at Uncut Casting, a company which books extras on popular TV shows, and within the first year was promoted three times, eventually becoming "head of 'new talent' division." Concurrently, Angelini worked for BGA Casting, and was dubbed the youngest casting director in Los Angeles by LA Splash Magazine in March 2013. Angelini left Uncut and BGA in summer of 2014 to start his own business.

== Events ==
In 2014, Angelini's company Angelini Entertainment partnered with the popular event production company Fame and Philanthropy, notable for their gala on the night of the 86th Academy Awards which featured a keynote speech from James Cameron and was attended by Charlize Theron, Halle Berry, Sean Penn and Paris Hilton.

Under the umbrella of Fame and Philanthropy, Angelini executive produced his first major event, which took place September 19, 2014, at the W Hotel. Dubbed The Key Cause, the event featured a keynote speech from Roya Mahboob, one of Time magazine's 100 Most Influential People, a performance by Yulianna, and a panel on the film industry featuring Angelini's grandfather Peter Wooley, Dale Godboldo, Dan Fleyshman, and others. Angelini would continue to produce several charity events in the Los Angeles area along with co-producer Ryan Long.

After cutting ties with Long and Fame and Philanthropy, Angelini would go on to throw numerous red carpet events in the Los Angeles area, including a breakthrough Grammy Night Party on the evening of the 57th Grammy Awards. The party, which took place at a Calabasas, California mansion and was attended by over 500 people including Sophia Loren, playboy playmateDevin DeVasquez, fashion designer Sue Wong, YouTube star Kahlil Underwood, rapper Scrilla King, Tony Asher, Tia Carrere, Matthew Ashford of Days of Our Lives, Kate Linder of The Young and the Restless, E. G. Daily, Patrika Darbo, Terri Ivens, the Steel Twins, and The Bold and the Beautiful star Ronn Moss. Moss's band Player performed their hit song "Baby Come Back", for the children of benefit charity, Songs of Love.

In June 2015, Angelini curated the inaugural art show for Edgar Allan Poe Award winning novelist Sonia Levitin who had never before premiered her artwork in public. The 3-hour art show was held at Christofle on Melrose Place and marked the first celebrity art show ever produced by Angelini, and the first art show ever produced at any Christofle location. Attendees of the event ranged from German royalty to Los Angeles street magicians. The event marked Levitin's debut in to the art world.

== Causes ==
In July 2015, Angelini traveled to West Africa to the opening of a school as part of the non-profit organization A New Dimension of Hope. The organization, based out of Denver, Colorado, builds schools and educational institutions for children of impoverished countries, opening their first school in Liberia. This first school, which was officially opened on the trip, was dedicated by Nobel Peace Prize winner, Leymah Gbowee at a ceremony which Angelini helped organize. At the ceremony, Angelini christened the school with the first book, Oh, the Places You'll Go! by Dr. Seuss, and gave a short speech to the future students and invited guests.

Angelini also sits on the board for his mother's non-profit theater conservatory, Gold Coast Theater Conservatory, of which he has also performed in several of their plays. The organization produces equity theater productions and teaches acting classes to youth and to children with autism.

Angelini is also a frequent supporter of his step-mother's organization, Animal Foundation of America.
