= Angeline of Marsciano =

Italian religious sister and foundress

Blessed Angelina of Marsciano T.O.R.
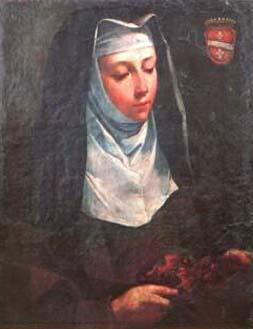

Foundress and abbess
- Born: 1357; Montegiove, Umbria, Papal States
- Died: 14 July 1435; Foligno, Umbria, Papal States
- Venerated in: Roman Catholic Church (Third Order of St. Francis and the Poor Clares)
- Beatified: 8 March 1825 ("cultus confirmed"), Saint Peter's Basilica, Rome, Papal States by Pope Leo XII
- Major shrine: Chiesa di San Francesco; Foligno, Perugia, Italy
- Feast: 13 July (previously 21 July)

Angelina of Marsciano, T.O.R. (or Angelina of Montegiove; 1357 – 14 July 1435) was an Italian religious sister and foundress, and is a beata of the Roman Catholic Church. She founded a congregation of religious sisters of the Franciscan Third Order Regular, known today as the Franciscan Sisters of Blessed Angelina. She is generally credited with the founding of the Third Order Regular for women, as her religious congregation marked the establishment of the first Franciscan community of women living under the rule of the Third Order Regular authorized by Pope Nicholas V.

Unlike the Second Order of the Franciscan movement, the Poor Clare nuns, they were not an enclosed religious order, but have been active in serving the poor around them for much of their history. She is commemorated by the Franciscans on 4 June; her liturgical feast is 13 July.

== Biography ==
=== Early life ===
In 1357, Angelina was born in her ancestral Castle of Montegiove, some 40 kilometres (25 mi) from Orvieto in Umbria, then part of the Papal States. She was the daughter of Jacopo Angioballi, the Count of Marsciano, and of Anna, the daughter of the Count of Corbara, which is why sometimes she is also referred to as Angelina of Corbara.

Left orphaned and alone, except for one sister, by the age of six, she was raised by her grandparents. Angelina was married at age 15 to Giovanni da Terni, the Count of Civitella del Tronto, in the Abruzzo region, within the Kingdom of Naples, but he died only two years later, leaving her a childless widow. His death left Angelina in charge of his castle and estate.

It was then that Angelina made the decision to dedicate her life to God (it would appear that she had considered being a nun before she was married). She was clothed as a Franciscan tertiary and, with several companions, began an apostolic mission around the countryside of the kingdom, preaching the values of repentance and virginity, as well as service to those in need.

Angelina's progress was arrested by the disturbance she caused in the communities where she called for young women to adopt religious life. She was doubly charged with sorcery, the imagined origin of her sway over women, and heresy, because of her allegedly Manichean opposition to marriage. Angelina defended herself before Ladislas, the King of Naples, who dismissed the charges, but expelled her and her companions from the kingdom, in order to avoid further complaints.

Angelina then went to Assisi, where she stopped to rest and to pray at the Basilica of Santa Maria degli Angeli, the cradle of the Franciscan Order. There she experienced a vision, wherein God instructed her to found a cloistered monastery under the Rule of the Third Order of Saint Francis in Foligno. The local bishop approved the plans with little hesitation, as they meant an end to her troublesome active ministry.

=== Foundress ===
Angelina settled in Foligno about 1394. She soon joined the Monastery of St. Anna, a small community of women Franciscan tertiaries, which had been founded in 1388 by the Blessed Paoluccio Trinci, (died 1390) a Franciscan friar who had been related to her sister through marriage. Known as the "Monastery of the Countesses"—due to the social standing of most of its members, he had established it out of his vision of having these noble women of the city serve as an evangelizing force in their society. The women lived ascetic lives in the monastery, and, not being nuns, followed a very informal structure, free to come and go as they wished, that they might be able to serve the poor and sick of the region.

Angelina took a leadership role in the small group and began to organize their lives into a more regular form. By 1397 she was considered the leader of the 12 founding members. In 1403, she was able to obtain a papal bull from Pope Boniface IX which formally recognized the status of the house as a monastery. The reputation of the community in Foligno was so successful that quickly communities of Franciscan tertiary women (called bizocche locally) throughout the region sought to affiliate with them. Communities under her authority were soon established in Florence, Spoleto, Assisi and Viterbo, along with 11 others, before her death in 1435.

The diverse communities were recognized as a congregation by Pope Martin V in 1428. This decree also allowed them to elect a minister general (a title since reserved for the head of the friars) who would have the right of canonical visitation of the other communities. The congregation held its first general elections in 1430, in which Angela was elected their first minister general. In this office, she developed the statutes for the congregation, to be followed by all of its houses.

This degree of independence was not welcomed by the Friars Minor, who had been granted complete authority over the tertiaries that same year. The minister general of the friars, Guglielmo da Casala, demanded that the Third Order Sisters of the congregation be confirmed under obedience to him. Angelina had to submit and, in a public ceremony held in the friars' church in Foligno on 5 November 1430, vowed obedience to the local minister provincial.

This act of obedience, however, was repudiated by the chapter of the community at Santa Anna, saying that it was invalid due to having been forced under duress and without their approval. The Holy See confirmed their autonomy the following year. To avoid the potential for future repetition of this conflict, the congregation put itsel under the obedience of their local bishops, with their spiritual direction to come from the friars of the Third Order Regular of St. Francis of Penance.

== Legacy and veneration ==
Angeline died on 14 July 1435.

Blessed Angelina was interred in the Church of St. Francis in Foligno. Her remains were removed to a grander shrine in 1492. Her cultus was approved in 1825.

Due to the requirement of keeping their communities small and simple, Angelina's congregation gained greatest popularity in the 15th and 16th centuries. In 1428, they had been put briefly by Pope Martin V under the jurisdiction of the Friars Minor, with a specific mandate for the education and instruction of young girls. Even so, their work was fairly apostolic until they were required to become an enclosed religious order in 1617, having taken solemn vows with a strict separation from the affairs of the external world, limited to the education of girls within the cloister. With a 1903 lift of papal enclosure, a wider apostolate was again permitted, and the congregation became known as the Franciscan Sisters of Blessed Angelina. In 1750, it consisted of 11 houses and 80 members.

In 2000, it has houses in Brazil, Madagascar and Switzerland, as well as in Italy.

== See also ==
- Third Order of St. Francis
- Counts of Marsciano (in Italian)
