= Angelino Apelar =

Evangelical Christian leader in Filipino American community

Angelino "Andy" Baldemor Apelar (June 16, 1927 – January 23, 2006) was an Evangelical Christian leader in the Filipino American community, and a founder of the Association of Filipino Churches (AFC) of the Christian and Missionary Alliance. He had served as a missionary/pastor and radio broadcaster in the Philippines before moving to the United States to start the AFC. He served as president for several terms. He graduated from the Far Eastern Bible Institute and Seminary, where he also met his future wife, Purita Palomar, a member of one of Capiz province's influential families. They have two children: Faith and Jemuel Apelar.
