= Angelina (surname) =

Angelina is a surname. It is the feminine form of the family name Angelos. Notable people with the surname include:

== Byzantine Greece ==
- Anna Komnene Angelina (c. 1176 – 1212), Empress of Nicaea, daughter of Byzantine Emperor Alexios III Angelos and Euphrosyne Doukaina Kamatera
- Eudokia Angelina (c. 1173 – c. 1211), consort of Stefan the First-Crowned, Grand Prince of Serbia, and daughter of Byzantine Emperor Alexios III Angelos and Euphrosyne Doukaina Kamaterina
- Helena Doukaina Angelina (fl. 1273–1283), Greek noblewoman of Thessaly
- Irene Angelina (c. 1181 – 1208), daughter of Byzantine Emperor Isaac II Angelos and Herina
- Theodora Angelina (1190–1246), daughter of Anna Komnene Angelina and Isaac Komnenos; wife of Leopold VI of Austria

== Other ==
- Christina Angelina, American visual artist, photographer, and gallerist in Los Angeles
- Ellen Angelina (born 1976), Indonesian badminton player
- Eva Angelina (born c. 1985), American pornographic actress
- Pasha Angelina (1912–1959), Soviet female tractor-operator

== See also ==
- Angelina (disambiguation)
