= Anra scarab =

Ancient jewellery found in the Levant, Egypt and Nubia (artifact)

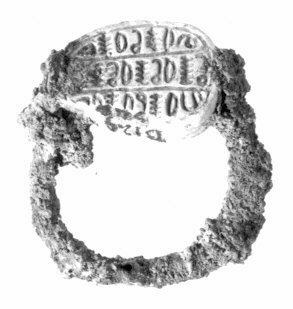
Scarab seal ring with Hyksos-period anra inscription

Anra scarabs are scarab seals dating to the Second Intermediate Period (1700–1550 BC) found in the Levant, Egypt and Nubia. Anra scarabs are identified by an undeciphered and variable sequence of Egyptian hieroglyphs on the base of the scarab which always include the symbols a, n and r. As anra scarabs have overwhelmingly been found in Palestine (~80%), it has been suggested it was marketed by the contemporaneous 15th Dynasty for the Canaanites.

The artifacts have tentatively been associated with the gods El and Ra, who were identified with each other in the Ramesside Period.

== Meaning ==
D36 n r D36
ʿ-n-r-ʿ
anra
in hieroglyphs
Era: 2nd Intermediate Period
(1650–1550 BC)

Scarab seals were produced in vast numbers for many centuries and many thousands have survived. They were generally intended to be worn or carried by the living. They were typically carved or moulded in the form of a scarab beetle (usually identified as Scarabaeus sacer) with varying degrees of naturalism but usually at least indicating the head, wing case and legs but with a flat base. The base was usually inscribed with designs or hieroglyphs to form an impression seal.

Whilst some consider the anra sequence on the base of scarabs to be nonsense and random, others consider it to have a more specific meaning. The sequence would have been considered important as it was included on the royal name scarabs of the pharaoh Senusret I and on a cylinder seal of Hyksos king Khyan. It was also reused by Ramesses II.

Some scholars consider the anra scarabs were used only for its amuletic qualities, and that the seals found in Palestine were an adapted Canaanite form of an Egyptian funerary custom, transmitted through Asiatics living in the Nile Delta.Murray argued that the skill and subsequent cost of producing anra scarabs would not have been spent haphazardly on ignorant copies of misunderstood inscriptions, and must have been important and relayed meaning to the wearer. The Canaanites often incorporated Egyptian iconography into their designs, but in such a manner to suggest that they understood what they were using.

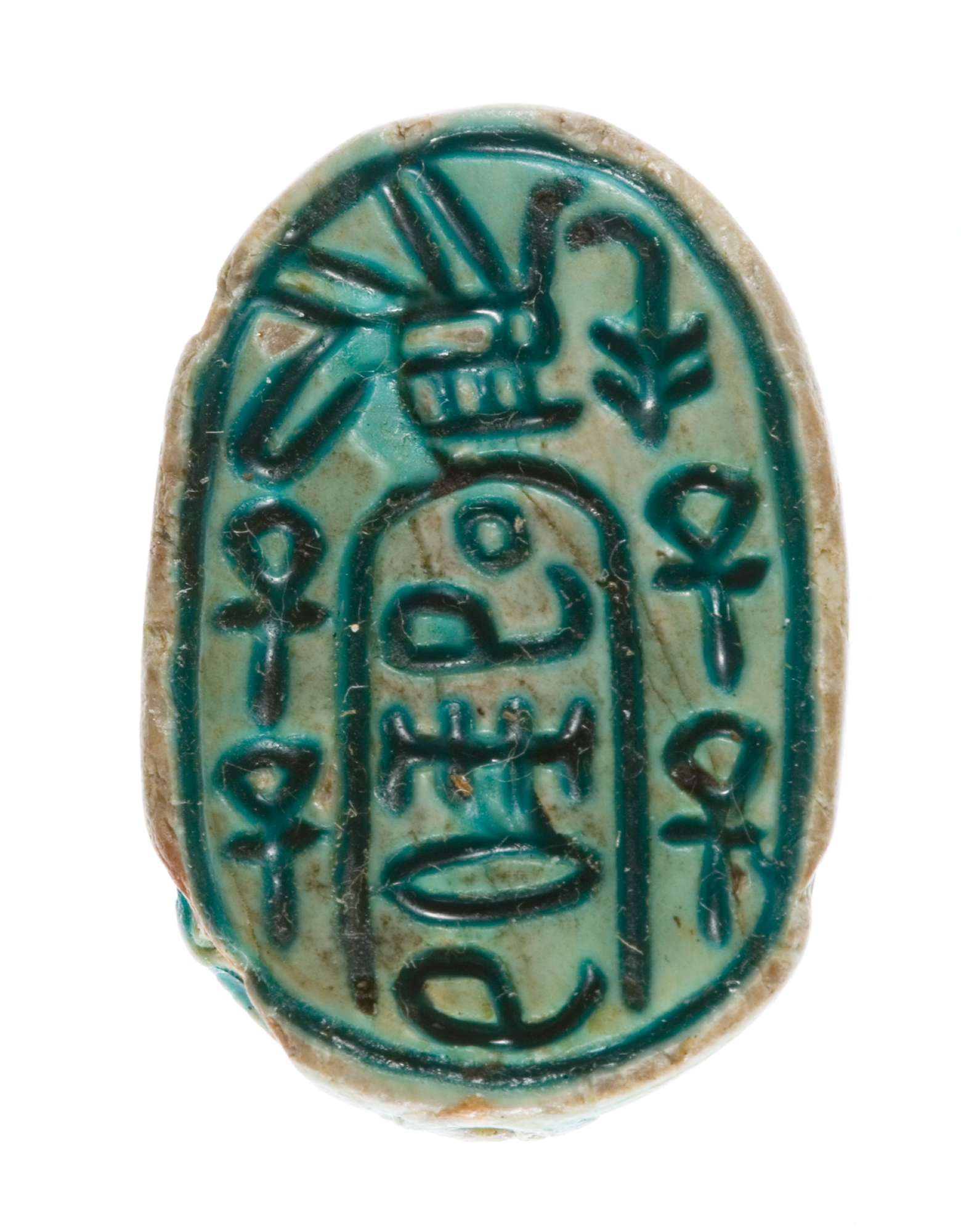
Canaanite scarab with nswt-bjt and ankh symbols that border the sequence in a cartouche

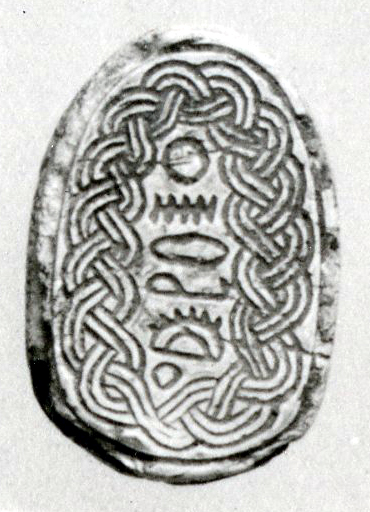
Anra sequence with supplementary symbols

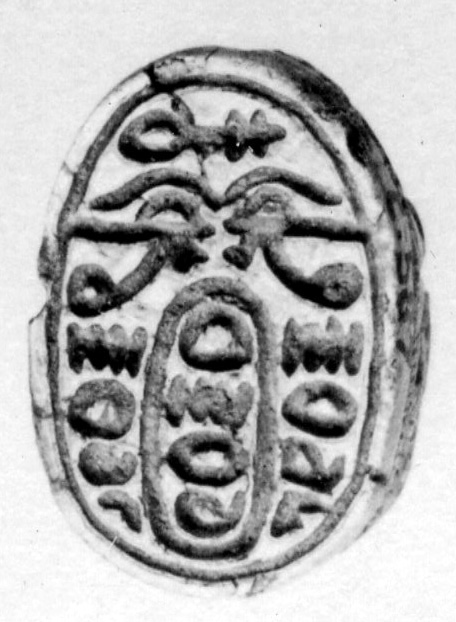
The sequence in a cartouche with Eye of Horus iconography

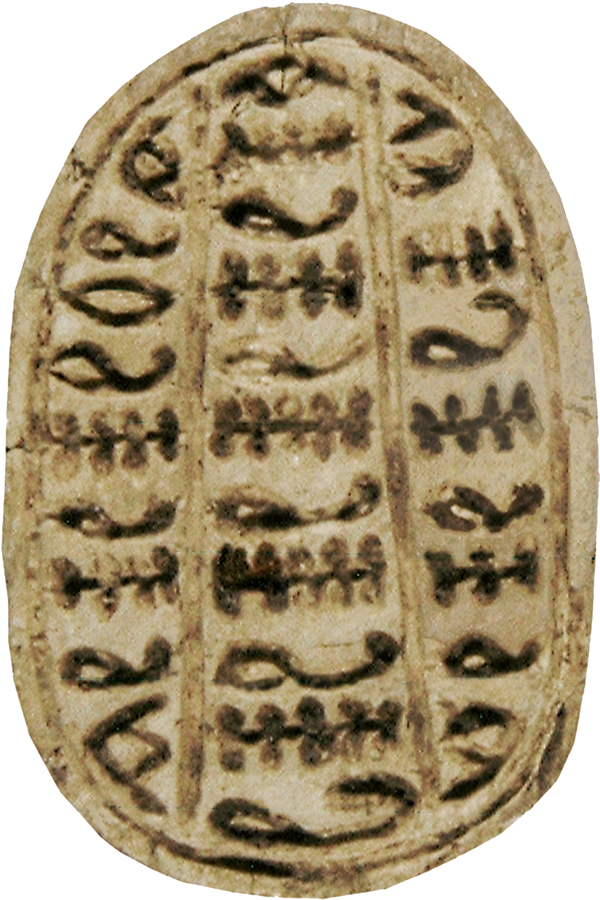
An example with repeating glyphs featuring variations on the sequence.

=== Religious ===
Fiona Richards proposed that the added ḥtp symbol to the anra sequence found on scarabs equates to the Canaanite deity El. As this anra sequence is confined to Palestine, it could mean it was deliberately marketed for them specifically. As the princes of Byblos adopted Egyptian titles and the use of Egyptian symbols permeated Syrian glyptic, the use of El by the Egyptians would not seem out of place if considered at a time of heightened socio-political ties.

It has been suggested that when the inscriptions are presented in their full, unshortened form, it equates to the god Ra. El is equated to Ra, and they are identified as one and the same in the Ramesside Period. Hornung and Staehelin associated the formula with a spell connected to Ra.

=== Secret ===
Schulman interprets the sequence as texts written in a secret, enigmatic manner, comprehensible only to the initiate, which served to increase and enhance the potency of the charm.

=== Protection ===
Due to associations with royal emblems (75% of all anra scarabs are associated with signs and symbols of Egyptian royalty), Murray proposed that it could be possible that these scarabs were intended to "commemorate the solemn ceremony of the giving of the Re-name to the king, and to protect the name where given."

=== Magic ===
It has been put forward that the inscriptions are associated with the "abracadabra" magical words that exist in Egyptian magical texts.

=== Good luck ===
Daphna Ben-Tor argues that the anra sequence did not have a specific meaning, but was rather treated as a generic group of good luck symbols with Egyptian prestige value.

=== Blessing ===
The anra sequence could have its origins in the Neferzeichen (royal power or blessing) patterns of the Middle Kingdom.

=== King ===
Weill believed that it was associated with a king of the same name.

== Location ==
Anra scarabs have been found at archaeological sites throughout the Levant, Egypt and Nubia. Notable sites include: Ras Shamra, Byblos, Beth-shan, Pella, Memphis, Shechem, Gezer, Shiloh, Amman, Gerar, Tell El-Dab'a, Esna, Debeira, Mirgissa, Jericho and Rishon. They have been found amongst precious objects such as gold, gemstones and weapons at a higher rate than other scarabs found in tombs, and they have been discovered in the archaeological remains of palaces, temples, sanctuaries and residences of high ranking officials.

In Egypt and Nubia, the anra scarabs that have been found stay closer to the original three sign sequence without the supplementary Egyptian iconography more prevalent in the Levant.

=== Gaza ===
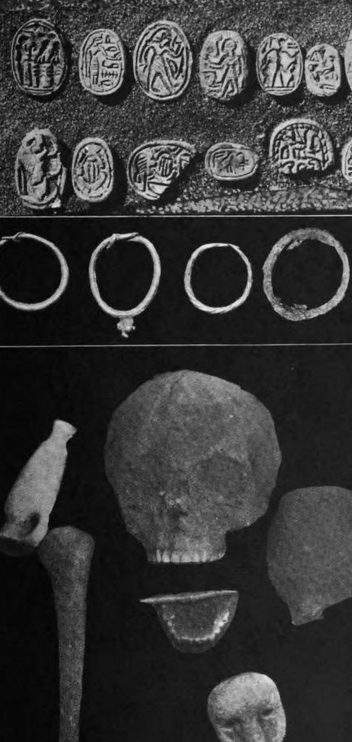

=== Gezer ===
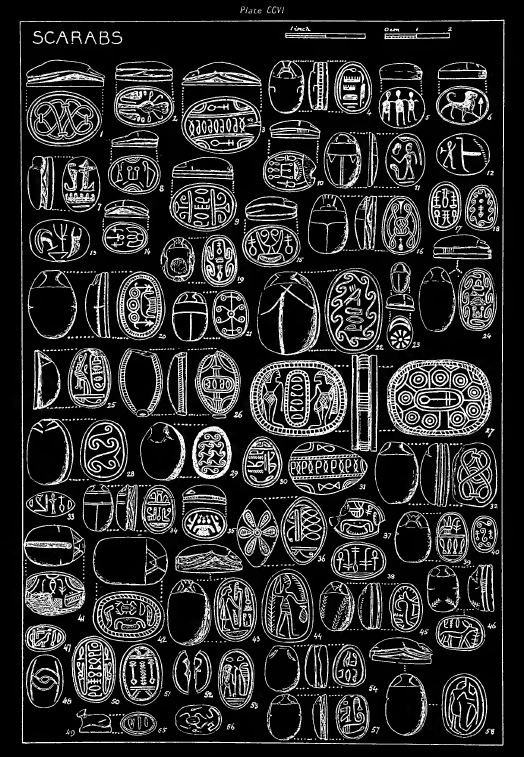

=== Sedment ===
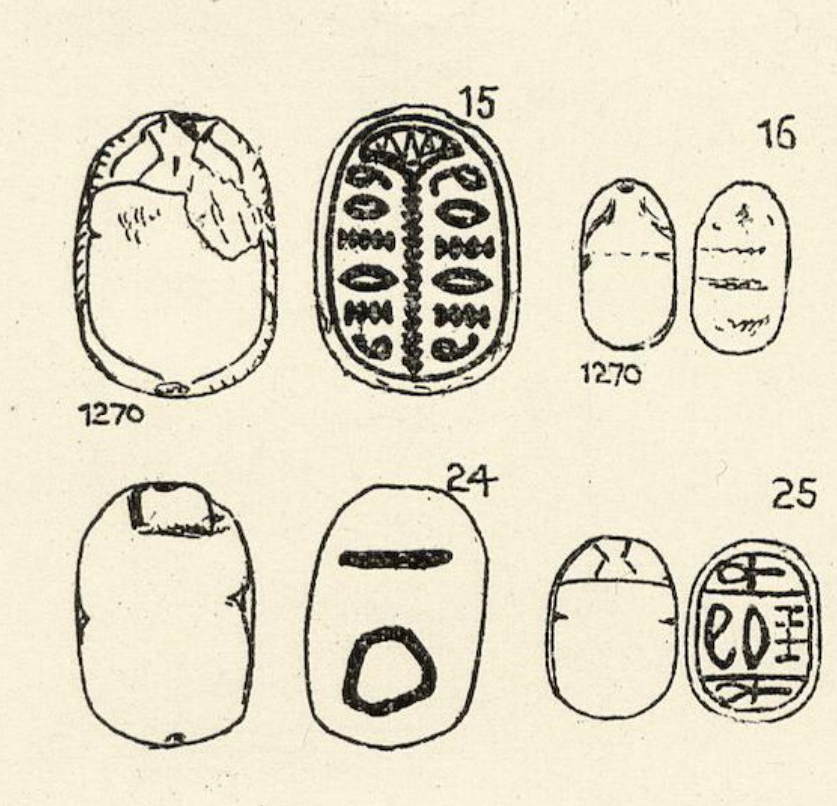

== See also ==
- Scarab (artifact)
- Hyksos
- Second Intermediate Period of Egypt
