= Angelini (surname) =

Angelini is an Italian surname. It originated from the Greek word anà-ghelòs, meaning "messenger of God".

Notable people with the surname include:

- Alberto Angelini (born 1974), Italian Olympic water polo player
- Anacleto Angelini (1914–2007), Italian-born Chilean businessman
- Anthony Angelini (born 1994), American entrepreneur
- Annibale Angelini (1812–1884), Italian painter and scenographer
- Armando Angelini (1891–1968), Italian lawyer and politician
- Arnaldo Maria Angelini (1909–1999), Italian engineer and professor of Electrotechnics
- Claudio Angelini (1943–2015), Italian correspondent for the RAI; director of the Italian Cultural Institute in New York
- Costanzo Angelini (1760–1853), Italian painter
- Donald Angelini (1926–2000), American mobster and caporegime with the Chicago Outfit
- Fiorenzo Angelini (1916–2014), Italian Roman Catholic cardinal
- Giordano Angelini (born 1939), Italian businessman and politician
- Giovanni Angelini, Italian politician
- Giuseppe Angelini, multiple people
- Maria Lea Pedini-Angelini (born 1954), San Marino politician; Captain Regent of San Marino 1981
- Mary Pat Angelini (born 1954), American politician from New Jersey; state legislator since 2008
- Nando Angelini (1933–2025), Italian actor
- Norm Angelini (1947–2019), former Major League Baseball pitcher
- Pietro Angelini (born 1971), Italian tennis player
- Sara Angelini (born 1987), Venezuelan model
- Scipione Angelini (1661–1729), Italian painter of the Baroque era
- Tito Angelini (1806–1878), Italian sculptor in Naples
