= Angelina Eichhorst =

Dutch diplomat

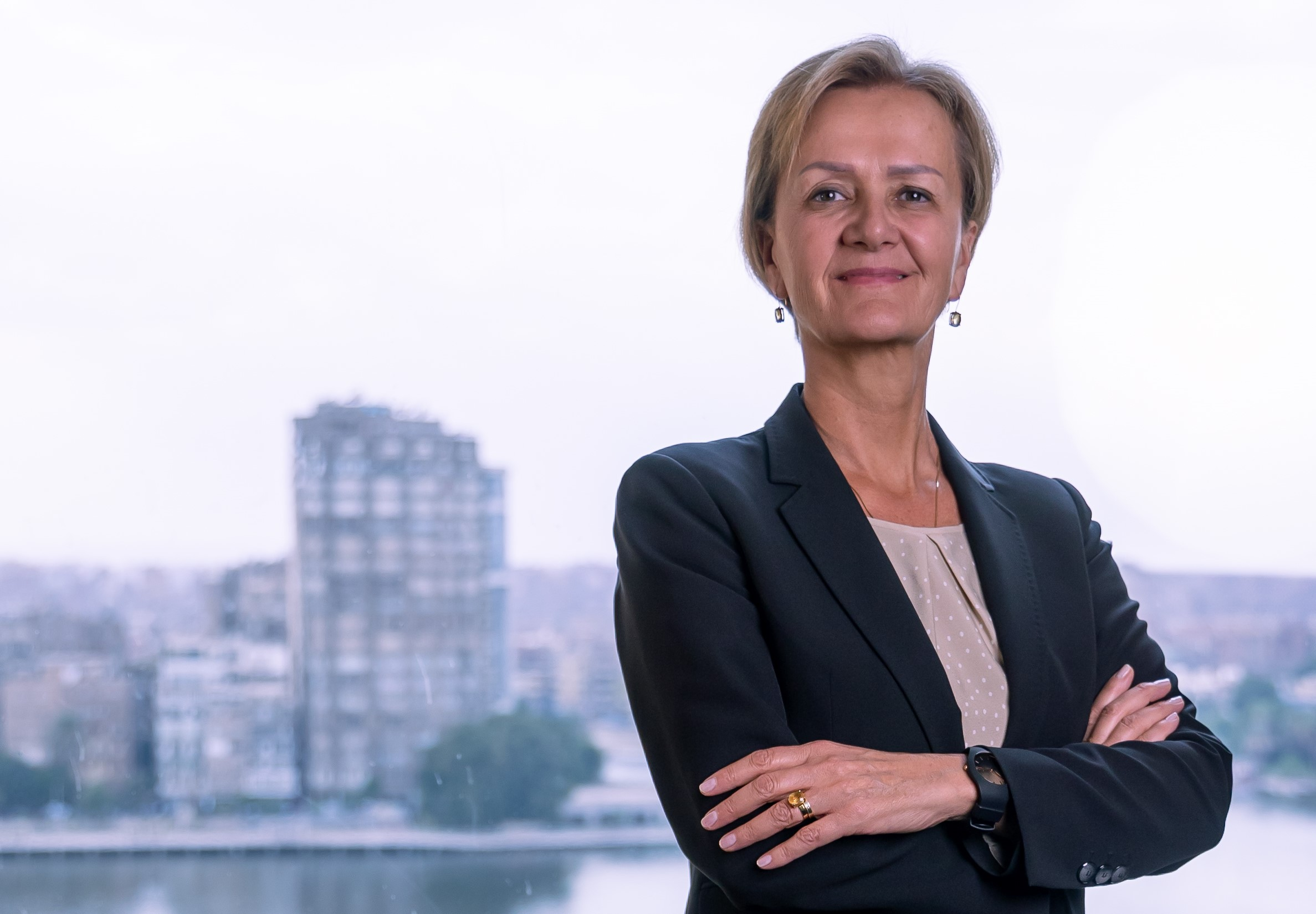
- Cairo 2024

Angelina Julietta Francisca Eichhorst is a European civil servant and since November 2024 the European Union Ambassador to Egypt and the League of Arab States (LAS).

== Career ==
=== European External Action Service ===
In September 2010 HRVP Catherine Ashton announced the first class of European Union ambassadors to be posted abroad following the entry into force of the Treaty of Lisbon.

Eichhorst served from January 2011 to August 2015 as European Union ambassador / Head of the European Union Delegation to Lebanon.

In July 2015 Eichhorst was appointed by EU HRVP Federica Mogherini as Deputy Managing Director / Director Western Europe, Western Balkans and Turkey at the European External Action Service in Brussels. During this period she was also the EU Chief Negotiator for the then EU HRVP Facilitated Belgrade-Pristina Dialogue.

On 1 September 2019, Eichhorst took charge of Thomas Mayr-Harting's portfolio as acting Managing Director for Europe and Central Asia and on 1 June 2020 EU HRVP Josep Borrell confirmed Eichhorst as Managing Director. During 2021 - 2023 Eichhorst was, together with US Special Envoy Matthew Palmer leading negotiations in Bosnia and Herzegovina (BiH) on constitutional and electoral reforms.

She served for five Secretaries General at the European External Action Service: Pierre Vimont, Alain Le Roy, Helga Schmid, Stefano Sannino and Belén Martínez Carbonell.

During her term with EU HRVP Josep Borrell she worked extensively on the EU's enlargement portfolio EU enlargement – European Union, on EU-EEA/EFTA relations, Arctic matters, the post-Brexit EU-UK file, EU-Türkiye relations, and the Cyprus issue following HRVP Mogherini's work in Crans Montana in 2017. From 2018 to 2024 she supported the reinvigoration of a UN-led mediation process on the Cyprus issue, currently led by UN Special Envoy Maria Angela Holguin Cuellar.

In April 2024 EU HRVP Josep Borrell nominated Eichhorst as the next EU Ambassador in Cairo EEAS: High Representative Josep Borrell nominated new Heads of EU Delegations for the upcoming diplomatic rotation | EEAS

=== European Commission ===
Eichhorst joined the European Commission in Brussels in 1996, where at the then DG IB External relations, led by Ambassador DG Juan Prat, she held various positions in charge of the Euro-Mediterranean Barcelona Process — now Union for the Mediterranean. She covered operations in Egypt, Yemen and Jordan.

From 2000 to 2003 she worked for then DG VIII —DG DEVCO the later DG INTPA International Partnerships – European Commission — led by then Ambassador DG Stefano Manservisi and DG Koos Richelle - as national expert seconded from the then ODA led by Clare Short.

She worked to initiate EU global policies on human and social development, corporate social responsibility, global public goods, sexual and reproductive health and rights. During part of this period she was the alternative board member for the EU at The Global Fund to Fight AIDS, Tuberculosis and Malaria assisting Dr. Lieve Fransen who was the EU member of the GFATM founding Board and later the co-chair of the Board. Substantial work was done with DG Trade on access to medicines.

In 2004 Eichhorst moved to Amman as Head of Development and Regional Cooperation at the EU Delegation to Jordan also covering EU interventions in Yemen.

In 2008 she was promoted to head the Political and Economic Affairs, Press, Information and Culture department at the EU Delegation in Damascus, Syria where she worked and lived until she took up her position as European Union ambassador in Beirut, Lebanon.

=== Pre-EU institutions ===
Before joining the EU institutions, between 1989 and 1996, Eichhorst worked for the United Nations Secretariat in New York in the Office for Research and Collection of Information directly attached to Secretary-General of the United Nations Javier Pérez de Cuéllar, and served as Political Affairs Officer to the Forces Commander of UNOSOM I, the first United Nations Operation in Somalia.

She held advisory and management positions in Cairo, Egypt (at the Netherlands Flemish Institute, Shell Marketing Egypt, Save the ChildrenNorth South Consultants Exchange).

Ambassador Eichhorst holds two MA degrees: languages and cultures of the Middle East, Catholic University in Nijmegen, with her thesis on Egyptian women writers; and international relations, Université libre de Bruxelles, describing the challenges of NATO's Mediterranean Dialogue.

She has special degrees in international law, human rights and the law of international organisations.
