= Angelina & Neches River Authority =

Angelina & Neches River Authority (Texas)
- Abbreviation: ANRA
- Formation: 1949
- Purpose: Water management and conservation
- Headquarters: 210 E. Lufkin Ave, Lufkin, TX 75902
- Region served: 17 county jurisdiction in the Neches River Basin: Van Zandt, Smith, Henderson, Newton, Cherokee, Anderson, Rusk, Houston, Nacogdoches, San Augustine, Shelby, Angelina, Trinity, Sabine, Polk, Jasper, and Orange
- President: Jody Anderson
- Main organ: Board of Directors
- Website: http://www.anra.org/

The Angelina & Neches River Authority (ANRA) is an independent government agency in Texas. It was established in 1949 or 1950, though it did not become active until the 1970s.

== Operations ==
The Angelina & Neches River Authority was created by Article 16, Section 59 of the state constitution of Texas. Its purpose is water quality management and development and conservation of water resources in part of the Neches River watershed and it oversees several environmental programs in the middle and upper reaches of the watershed. The agency has jurisdiction over 8,500 square miles (22,000 km^{2}) in part or all of 17 counties in Texas. It serves an estimated 600,000 people. The agency's jurisdiction is roughly adjacent to those of the Sabine River Authority, the Trinity River Authority, and the Lower Neches Valley Authority.

The Angelina & Neches River Authority receives its governance from a nine-member Board of Directors, who are appointed by the Governor of Texas for six-year terms. The board serves to create policy and provide oversight. The agency receives no tax revenues from the state and is not able to levy taxes. It gets its money through consumer payments for its services.

A company known as Tomlin Infrastructure Group is partnered with the Angelina & Neches River Authority for a water supply operation based on surface water. This is highly unusual, as surface water supply operations are typically done by the private sector.

The Angelina & Neches River Authority has its headquarters in Lufkin, Texas.

== History ==
The Angelina & Neches River Authority was established in 1949 or 1950 as the Neches River Conservation District, which was formed from the Sabine-Neches River Conservation District, which was itself established in 1935. The agency was not active until the 1970s, when a nine-member Board of Directors was appointed by then-governor of Texas, Preston Smith.

During the 1970s, the Angelina & Neches River Authority created various plans for water quality management and development and conservation of water resources. The agency also participated in a variety of other activities, including water quality studies in the upper Neches River watershed and sample collection, field analysis, and industrial waste analysis for the cities of Lufkin and Jacksonville. They also assisted the forest service and petroleum industries, water supply companies, cities, and private individuals in testing for drinking water contamination.

In the 1980s, the Angelina & Neches River Authority was contracted by the Texas Department of Water Resources to carry out studies on sewage treatment. One such study was a study of seven municipal sewage treatment plants in East Texas in 1982. Another study, in 1985, concerned sludge disposal methods for sewage treatment plants in the upper part of the Neches River watershed.

In 1990, the Angelina & Neches River Authority conducted the Nacogdoches County Water Study. The agency also continued with necessary acquisitions and permits for Lake Eastex and also worked on several other initiatives. In 1992, it first water quality report on the upper Neches River watershed in accordance with the 1991 Clean Rivers Act. Between 2000 and 2014, the agency received eight contracts with a total obligation amount of $81,926. In November 2015, the agency experienced a major failure of a sanitary sewer collection system.
