= Ulpiano Volpi =

Italian prelate (1559–1629)

Most Reverend Ulpiano Volpi
- Archbishop (Personal Title) of Novara
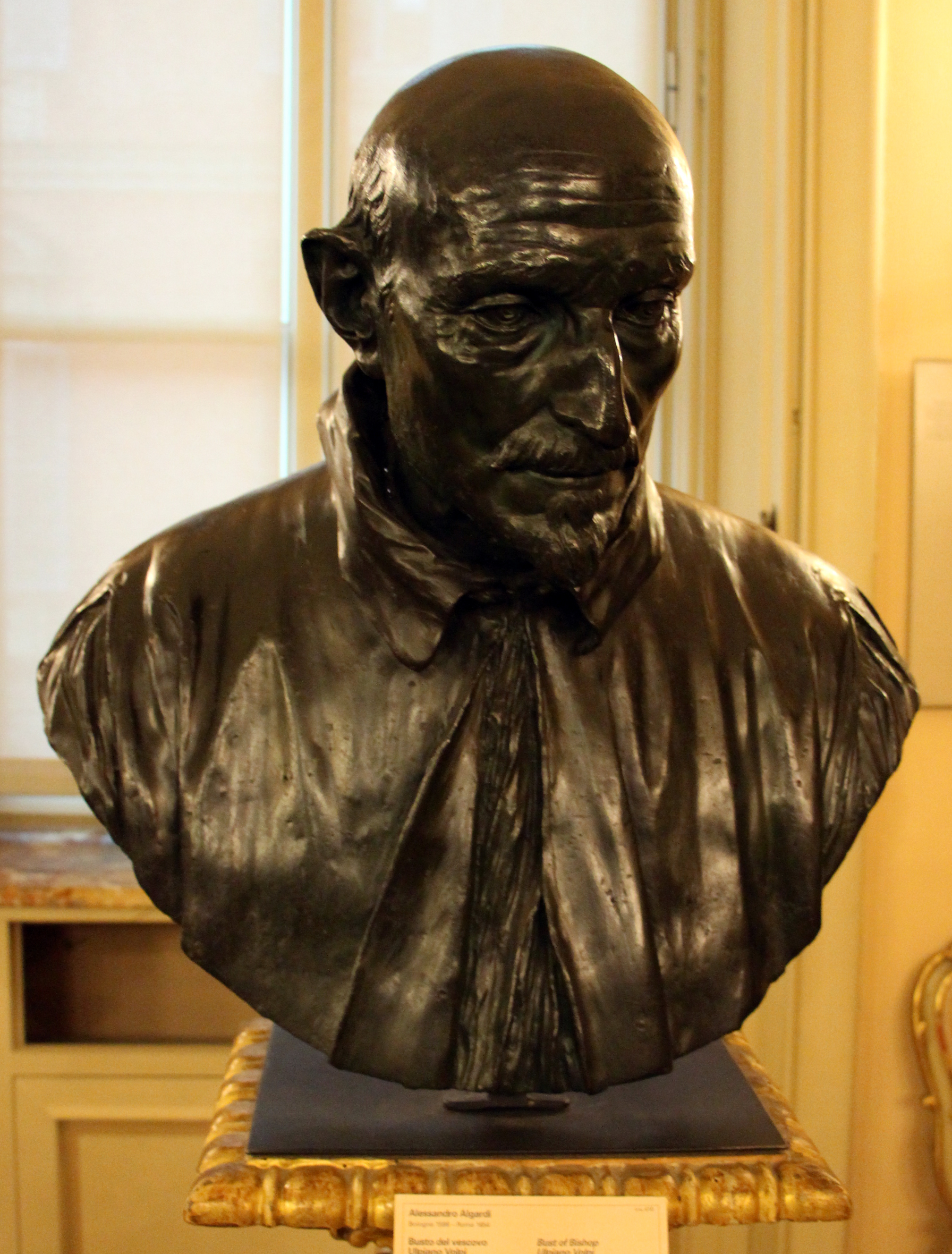
- Church: Catholic Church
- Diocese: Diocese of Novara
- In office: 1619–1629
- Predecessor: Ferdinando Taverna
- Successor: Giovanni Pietro Volpi
- Previous post: Archbishop of Chieti (1609–1615)

Orders
- Consecration: 5 April 1609 by Michelangelo Tonti

Personal details
- Born: 1559 Como, Italy
- Died: 10 March 1629 (age 70) Novara, Italy

Ulpiano Volpi or Volpiano Volpi (1559 – 10 March 1629) was an Italian Roman Catholic prelate who served as Archbishop (Personal Title) of Novara (1619–1629), and Archbishop of Chieti (1609–1615).

== Biography ==
Ulpiano Volpi was born in Como, Italy in 1559. On 11 March 1609, he was appointed during the papacy of Pope Paul V as Archbishop of Chieti. On 5 April 1609, he was consecrated bishop by Michelangelo Tonti, Bishop of Cesena, with Domenico Rivarola, Titular Archbishop of Nazareth, and Alessandro Borghi, Bishop Emeritus of Sansepolcro, serving as co-consecrators. He served as Archbishop of Chieti until his resignation on 16 December 1615. On 13 November 1619, he was appointed during the papacy of Pope Paul V as Archbishop (Personal Title) of Novara. He served as Archbishop of Novara until his death on 10 March 1629.

His palace home, the Palazzo Volpi in Como was converted into the town's civic art gallery.

== Episcopal succession ==
Episcopal succession of Ulpiano Volpi

While bishop, he was the principal consecrator of:

- Pasquale Grassi, Bishop of Chioggia (1619);
- Agostino Morosini, Titular Archbishop of Damascus (1621);
- Giovanni Benini, Titular Archbishop of Hadrianopolis in Haemimonto (1622);
- Lorenzo Magalotti, Bishop of Ferrara (1628);

and the principal co-consecrator of:

- Lodovico Magio, Bishop of Lucera (1609);
- Alessandro Ludovisi, Archbishop of Bologna (1612);
- Porfirio Feliciani, Bishop of Foligno (1612);
- Denis-Simon de Marquemont, Archbishop of Lyon (1612);
- Francesco Sacrati, Titular Archbishop of Damascus (1612);
- Franciscus Boncianni, Archbishop of Pisa (1613);
- Curzio Cocci, Archbishop of Conza (1614);
- Andrea Giustiniani, Bishop of Isola (1614);
- Agostino Cassandra, Bishop of Gravina di Puglia (1614);
- Scipione Pasquali, Bishop of Casale Monferrato (1615);
- Fabio Piccolomini, Bishop of Massa Marittima (1615);
- Bernardino Buratti, Bishop of Vulturara e Montecorvino (1615);
- Paolo Emilio Filonardi, Archbishop of Amalfi (1616);
- Michelangelo Seghizzi, Bishop of Lodi (1616);
- Vitalianus Visconti Borromeo, Titular Archbishop of Hadrianopolis in Haemimonto and Apostolic Nuncio to Emperor (1616);
- Vincenzo Landinelli, Bishop of Albenga (1616);
- Vincenzo Agnello Suardi, Bishop of Alba (1616);
- Paolo Emilio Santori (Santorio), Archbishop of Cosenza (1617);
- Giulio Monterenzi, Bishop of Faenza (1618);
- Gregorio Del Bufalo, Bishop of Calvi Risorta (1619);
- Maurizio Ricci, Bishop of Cariati e Cerenzia (1619);
- Ludovico Gonzaga (bishop), Bishop of Alba (1619);
- Alfonso Giglioli, Bishop of Anglona-Tursi (1619);
- Ferdinando Millini, Bishop of Imola (1619);
- Ottavio Corsini, Titular Archbishop of Tarsus (1621);
- Cosimo de Torres, Titular Archbishop of Hadrianopolis in Haemimonto and Apostolic Nuncio to Poland (1621);
- Giovanni Mascardi, Bishop of Nebbio (1621);
- Aurelio Archinto, Bishop of Como (1621);
- Giuseppe Acquaviva, Titular Archbishop of Thebae (1621);
- Marco Antonio Gozzadini, Bishop of Tivoli (1622);
- Luigi Caetani, Titular Patriarch of Antioch (1622);
- Giovanni Pietro Volpi, Auxiliary Bishop of Novara (1622);
- Ascanio Castagna, Bishop of Isola (1622);
- Giulio del Pozzo, Bishop of Accia and Mariana (1622); and
- Alfonso Manzanedo de Quiñones, Titular Patriarch of Jerusalem (1622).

== External links and additional sources ==
- Cheney, David M. "Archdiocese of Chieti-Vasto". Catholic-Hierarchy.org. (for Chronology of Bishops) ^{[self-published]}
- Chow, Gabriel. "Archdiocese of Chieti-Vasto (Italy)". GCatholic.org. (for Chronology of Bishops) ^{[self-published]}
- Cheney, David M. "Diocese of Novara". Catholic-Hierarchy.org. (for Chronology of Bishops) ^{[self-published]}
- Chow, Gabriel. "Diocese of Novara (Italy)". GCatholic.org. (for Chronology of Bishops) ^{[self-published]}

Catholic Church titles
Preceded by Orazio Maffei	Archbishop of Chieti; 1609–1615	Succeeded by Paolo Tolosa
Preceded by Ferdinando Taverna	Archbishop (Personal Title) of Novara; 1619–1629	Succeeded by Giovanni Pietro Volpi
