= Antonio Celli =

Most Reverend Antonio Celli
- Bishop of Isola
- Church: Catholic Church
- Diocese: Diocese of Isola
- In office: 1641–1645
- Predecessor: Giuliano Viviani
- Successor: Domenico Carnevale

Orders
- Consecration: 6 October 1641 by Alessandro Cesarini (iuniore)

Personal details
- Born: 2 October 1595 Tolfa, Italy
- Died: 1645 (age 49) Isola, Italy

Antonio Celli, O.P. (2 October 1595 – 1645) was a Roman Catholic prelate who served as Bishop of Isola (1641–1645).

== Biography ==
Antonio Celli was born in Tolfa, Italy on 2 October 1595 and ordained a priest in the Order of Preachers. On 16 September 1641, he was appointed during the papacy of Pope Urban VIII as Bishop of Isola. On 6 October 1641, he was consecrated bishop by Alessandro Cesarini (iuniore), Cardinal-Deacon of Sant'Eustachio, with Giovanni Battista Altieri, Bishop Emeritus of Camerino, and Deodato Scaglia, Bishop of Melfi e Rapolla, serving as co-consecrators. He served as Bishop of Isola until his death in 1645. While bishop, he was the principal co-consecrator of Marco Antonio Gussio, Bishop of Cefalù (1644).

== External links and additional sources ==
- Cheney, David M. "Diocese of Isola". Catholic-Hierarchy.org. (for Chronology of Bishops) ^{[self-published]}
- Chow, Gabriel. "Titular Episcopal See of Isola (Italy)". GCatholic.org. (for Chronology of Bishops) ^{[self-published]}

Catholic Church titles
Preceded by Giuliano Viviani	Bishop of Isola; 1641–1645	Succeeded by Domenico Carnevale
