= Giuliano Viviani =

Most Reverend Giuliano Viviani
- Bishop of Isola
- Church: Catholic Church
- Diocese: Diocese of Isola
- In office: 1639–1640
- Predecessor: Martino Alfieri
- Successor: Antonio Celli
- Previous posts: Titular Bishop of Salona (1629–1639); Auxiliary Bishop of Ostia-Velletri (1629–1639)

Orders
- Consecration: 9 December 1629 by Marcello Lante della Rovere

Personal details
- Born: 1581 Pisa, Italy
- Died: November 1640 (age 59) Isola di Capo Rizzuto, Italy

Giuliano Viviani (1581–1640) was a Roman Catholic prelate who served as Bishop of Isola (1639–1640), Titular Bishop of Salona (1629–1639), and Auxiliary Bishop of Ostia-Velletri (1629–1639).

== Biography ==
Giuliano Viviani was born in Pisa, Italy in 1581. On 19 November 1629, he was appointed during the papacy of Pope Urban VIII as Titular Bishop of Salona and Auxiliary Bishop of Ostia-Velletri. On 9 December 1629, he was consecrated bishop by Marcello Lante della Rovere, Cardinal-Bishop of Frascati. On 2 May 1639, he was appointed during the papacy of Pope Urban VIII as Bishop of Isola. He served as Bishop of Isola until his death in November 1640.

== External links and additional sources ==
- Cheney, David M. "Salona (Titular See)". Catholic-Hierarchy.org. (for Chronology of Bishops) ^{[self-published]}
- Chow, Gabriel. "Titular Episcopal See of Salona (Italy)". GCatholic.org. (for Chronology of Bishops) ^{[self-published]}

== External links and additional sources ==
- Cheney, David M. "Diocese of Isola". Catholic-Hierarchy.org. (for Chronology of Bishops) ^{[self-published]}
- Chow, Gabriel. "Titular Episcopal See of Isola (Italy)". GCatholic.org. (for Chronology of Bishops) ^{[self-published]}

Catholic Church titles
Preceded by Giovanni Pietro Volpi	Titular Bishop of Salona; 1629–1639	Succeeded by Jonas Jeronimas Krišpinas
Preceded by	Auxiliary Bishop of Ostia-Velletri; 1629–1639	Succeeded by
Preceded by Martino Alfieri	Bishop of Isola; 1639–1640	Succeeded by Antonio Celli
