= Latin Bishopric of Salona =

The Latin Bishopric of Salona was a Roman Catholic diocese centred on Amfissa (medieval Salona), in Central Greece, during the period of Frankish rule there after the Fourth Crusade. The see was suppressed with the conquest of the region by the Ottoman Turks in 1410, but is retained by the Catholic Church as a titular see. It has been vacant since 1964.

The see is attested for the first time in the Provinciale Romanum, a list of the sees subordinate to the See of Rome, dating to 1228. It lists Salona as one of the eight suffragan sees of the Latin Archbishopric of Athens. The absence of Salona as a see in previous Notitiae Episcopatuum of the Orthodox Patriarchate of Constantinople has led to the Bishopric of Salona being usually considered a new foundation. Raymond-Joseph Loenertz however suggested that it was actually a replacement of the Greek Orthodox bishopric in nearby Loidoriki, and is followed by Kenneth Setton.

== Residential bishops ==
Name	Tenure	Notes
Philip, O.Carm.	1332 – 26 August 1342	succeeded to the Latin Archbishopric of Thebes
Albert	1373–1390	

== Titular bishops ==
The known titular bishops of Salona were:

Name	Tenure	Notes
Gerhard, O.F.M.	25 February 1429 – 8 January 1456	died in office
Sigismund Pirchan von Rosenberg, O.Cist.	1441 – 15 June 1472	died in office
Albert Schönhofer	17 May 1473 – 7 July 1493	died in office
Ulrich Pramberger, O.F.M	29 March 1484 – 22 December 1494	died in office
Fernando del Barco, O.Carm.	6 February 1521 – 1548	died in office
Augustin Mair, C.R.S.A.	8 June 1523 – 25 November 1543	died in office
Pedro Ruiz de la Camera, O.P.	4 June 1554 – 15 December 1564	died in office
Anton Resch, O.P.	17 March 1567 – 23 January 1583	died in office
Diego de la Calzada	17 February 1578 – ?	
Sebastian Bollinger	16 July 1584 – 8 July 1590	died in office
Cesare Fedele	13 August 1607 – 27 December 1620	died in office
Etienne de Brito (Stephanus de Brito), S.J.	11 January 1621 – 1624	succeeded to the Archbishopric of Cranganore
Giovanni Pietro Volpi	23 May 1622 – 10 March 1629	succeeded to the Bishopric of Novara
Giuliano Viviani	19 November 1629 – 2 May 1639	succeeded to the Bishopric of Isola
Jonas Jeronimas Krišpinas	30 August 1694 – 19 September 1695	succeeded to the Bishopric of Samogitia
Anton Johann Zerr	23 November 1925 – 15 December 1932	died in office
Frantisek Zapletal	20 January 1933 – 20 August 1935	died in office
Leone Giacomo Ossola, O.F.M.Cap.	22 September 1937 – 9 September 1945	succeeded to the Bishopric of Novara
Thomas Lawrence Noa	22 February 1946 – 10 August 1947	succeeded to the Bishopric of Marquette
Alain-Sébastien Le Breton, S.M.M	15 March 1957 – 16 December 1964	died in office

== Sources ==
- Setton, Kenneth M. (1976). The Papacy and the Levant (1204–1571), Volume I: The Thirteenth and Fourteenth Centuries. Philadelphia: The American Philosophical Society. ISBN 0-87169-114-0.
