= Benzo (disambiguation) =

Benzodiazepines are a class of depressant drugs.

Benzo may also refer to:

- Benzene, a chemical compound abbreviated as "benzo" in compound names
- Benzofuran, a heterocyclic compound
- Benzo of Alba (died c. 1089), Italian bishop

== See also ==
- Benzofury (disambiguation)
