= Ascanio Castagna =

17th-century Italian Catholic bishop

Most Reverend Ascanio Castagna
- Bishop of Isola
- Church: Catholic Church
- Diocese: Diocese of Isola
- Predecessor: Giovanni Antonio Massimo
- Successor: Alessandro Bichi

Orders
- Consecration: 11 September 1622 by Ottavio Bandini

Personal details
- Born: 1567 Turin, Duchy of Savoy
- Died: 16 December 1627 (age 60) Isola, [Kingdom of Naples]]

Ascanio Castagna (1567 – 16 December 1627) was a Roman Catholic prelate who served as Bishop of Isola (1622–1627).

== Biography ==
Ascanio Castagna was born in Turin, Italy in 1567. On 8 August 1622, he was appointed during the papacy of Pope Gregory XV as Bishop of Isola. On 11 September 1622, he was consecrated bishop by Ottavio Bandini, Cardinal-Bishop of Palestrina, with Ulpiano Volpi, Bishop of Novara, and Alessandro Guidiccioni (iuniore), Bishop of Lucca, serving as co-consecrators. He served as Bishop of Isola until his death on 16 December 1627.

== External links and additional sources ==
- Cheney, David M. "Diocese of Isola". Catholic-Hierarchy.org. (for Chronology of Bishops) ^{[self-published]}
- Chow, Gabriel. "Titular Episcopal See of Isola (Italy)". GCatholic.org. (for Chronology of Bishops) ^{[self-published]}

Catholic Church titles
Preceded by Giovanni Antonio Massimo	Bishop of Isola; 1622–1627	Succeeded by Alessandro Bichi
