= Bonadias de Nigronibus =

Most Reverend Bonadias de Nigronibus
- Bishop of Isola
- Church: Catholic Church
- Diocese: Diocese of Isola
- In office: 1479–1487
- Successor: Angelo Castalsi

Personal details
- Died: 1487 Isola di Capo Rizzuto, Italy

Bonadias de Nigronibus (died 1487) was a Roman Catholic prelate who served as Bishop of Isola (1479–1487).

== Biography ==
On 4 Jun 1479, Bonadias de Nigronibus was appointed by Pope Sixtus IV as Bishop of Isola. He served as Bishop of Isola until his death in 1487. While bishop, he served as the principal co-consecrator of Michael Hildebrand, Archbishop of Riga (1484).

== External links and additional sources ==
- Cheney, David M. "Diocese of Isola". Catholic-Hierarchy.org. (for Chronology of Bishops) ^{[self-published]}
- Chow, Gabriel. "Titular Episcopal See of Isola (Italy)". GCatholic.org. (for Chronology of Bishops) ^{[self-published]}

Catholic Church titles
Preceded by	Bishop of Isola; 1479–1487	Succeeded by Angelo Castalsi
