= Francesco Megale =

Roman Catholic prelate (1615–1681)

Most Reverend Francesco Megale
- Bishop of Isola
- Church: Catholic Church
- Diocese: Diocese of Isola
- In office: 1679–1681
- Predecessor: Carlo Rossi (bishop)
- Successor: Francesco Martini

Orders
- Consecration: 30 November 1679 by Alessandro Crescenzi (cardinal)

Personal details
- Born: 3 March 1615 San Mauro Marchesato, Italy
- Died: 4 November 1681 (age 66) Isola di Capo Rizzuto, Italy

Francesco Megale (3 March 1615 – 4 November 1681) was a Roman Catholic prelate who served as Bishop of Isola (1679–1681).

== Biography ==
Francesco Megale was born in San Mauro Marchesato, Italy on 3 March 1615. On 27 November 1679, he was appointed during the papacy of Pope Innocent XI as Bishop of Isola. On 30 November 1679, he was consecrated bishop by Alessandro Crescenzi (cardinal), Bishop of Recanati e Loreto, with Prospero Bottini, Titular Archbishop of Myra, and Pier Antonio Capobianco, Bishop Emeritus of Lacedonia, serving as co-consecrators. He served as Bishop of Isola until his death on 4 November 1681.

== External links and additional sources ==
- Cheney, David M. "Diocese of Isola". Catholic-Hierarchy.org. (for Chronology of Bishops) ^{[self-published]}
- Chow, Gabriel. "Titular Episcopal See of Isola (Italy)". GCatholic.org. (for Chronology of Bishops) ^{[self-published]}

Catholic Church titles
Preceded by Carlo Rossi (bishop)	Bishop of Isola; 1679–1681	Succeeded by Francesco Martini
