= Michael Hildebrand =

Most Reverend Michael Hildebrand
- Archbishop of Riga
- Church: Catholic Church
- Archdiocese: Archdiocese of Riga
- In office: 1484–1509
- Predecessor: Silvester Stodewescher
- Successor: Jasper Linde

Orders
- Consecration: 13 Jun 1484 by Pierre Fridaricus

Personal details
- Died: 5 February 1509 Riga, Latvia

Michael Hildebrand (died 5 Feb 1509) was a Roman Catholic prelate who served as Archbishop of Riga (1484–1509).

== Biography ==
On 4 Jun 1484, Michael Hildebrand was appointed by Pope Sixtus IV as Archbishop of Riga. On 13 Jun 1484, he was consecrated by Pierre Fridaricus, Bishop of Nisyros, with Bonadias de Nigronibus, Bishop of Isola, and William O’Ferral, Bishop of Ardagh, serving as co-consecrators. He served as Archbishop of Riga until his death on 5 Feb 1509.

Catholic Church titles
Preceded by Silvester Stodewescher	Archbishop of Riga; 1484–1509	Succeeded by Jasper Linde
