= Annibale Caracciolo =

Most Reverend Annibale Caracciolo
- Bishop of Isola
- Church: Catholic Church
- Diocese: Diocese of Isola
- In office: 1562–1605
- Predecessor: Onorato Fascitelli
- Successor: Scipione Montalegre

Personal details
- Died: 1605 Isola di Capo Rizzuto, Italy

Annibale Caracciolo (died 1605) was a Roman Catholic prelate who served as Bishop of Isola (1562–1605).

== Biography ==
On 4 May 1562, Annibale Caracciolo was appointed during the papacy of Pope Pius IV as Bishop of Isola. He served as Bishop of Isola until his death in 1605. While bishop, he was the principal co-consecrator of Giulio Antonio Santorio, Archbishop of Santa Severina (1566).

== External links and additional sources ==
- Cheney, David M. "Diocese of Isola". Catholic-Hierarchy.org. (for Chronology of Bishops) ^{[self-published]}
- Chow, Gabriel. "Titular Episcopal See of Isola (Italy)". GCatholic.org. (for Chronology of Bishops) ^{[self-published]}

Catholic Church titles
Preceded by Onorato Fascitelli	Bishop of Isola; 1562–1605	Succeeded by Scipione Montalegre
