= Benedetto Giustiniani =

Italian clergyman

His Eminence Benedetto Giustiniani
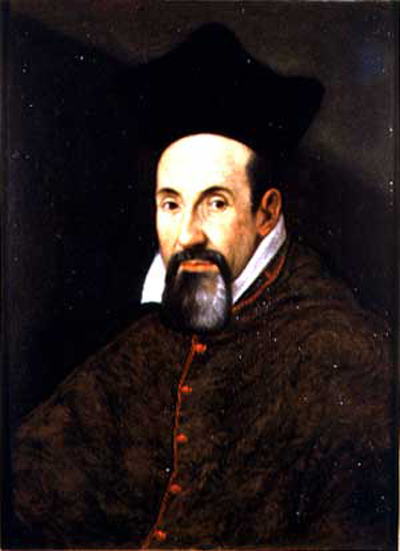
- Church: Catholic Church
- See: Roman Catholic Suburbicarian Diocese of Porto-Santa Rufina
- Appointed: 31 August 1620
- Term ended: 21 September 1631
- Predecessor: Giovanni Evangelista Pallotta
- Successor: Francesco Maria Bourbon del Monte
- Other posts: Papal treasurer, Papal legate to Bologna

Orders
- Consecration: 2 July 1612 by Pope Paul V
- Created cardinal: 16 November 1586

Personal details
- Born: 5 June 1554 Genoa, Italy
- Died: 27 March 1621 (aged 66) Rome
- Buried: Santa Maria sopra Minerva

Benedetto Giustiniani (5 June 1554 – 27 March 1621) was an Italian clergyman who was made a cardinal in the consistory of 16 November 1586 by Pope Sixtus V.

He participated in the papal conclaves of 1592 and 1621. From 1615 to 1620, he was bishop of the Sabina and from 1620 to 1621 of Porto. Either he or his brother Vincenzo commissioned the 1621-1629 painting of Saint John the Evangelist by Domenichino. His postmortem inventory contained 280 paintings.

== Episcopal succession ==
Episcopal succession of Benedetto Giustiniani

While bishop, he was the principal consecrator of:

- Adam Nowodworski, Bishop of Kamyanets-Podilskyi (1615);
- Vincenzo Caputo, Bishop of San Severo (1615);
- Fabiano Giustiniano Giustiniani, Bishop of Ajaccio (1616);
- Alessandro Del Monte, Bishop of Gubbio (1616);
- Miguel Angel Zaragoza Heredia, Bishop of Teano (1617);
- Ludovico Gonzaga, Bishop of Alba (1619);
- Eusebius Caimus, Bishop of Novigrad (1620);
- Vincenzo Giovanni Spínola, Titular Bishop of Thagaste (1620);

and the principal co-consecrator of:

- Francesco Maria Bourbon Del Monte Santa Maria, Cardinal-Bishop of Palestrina (1615);
- Ferdinando Taverna, Bishop of Novara (1615); and
- Alessandro Damasceni Peretti, Cardinal-Bishop of Albano (1620).
