= Abel de Saint-Brieuc =

Most Reverend Abel de Saint-Brieuc
- Auxiliary Bishop of Reims
- Church: Catholic Church
- Archdiocese: Archdiocese of Reims
- In office: 1483–?

Orders
- Consecration: 21 Dec 1483 by Pierre Fridaricus

Abel de Saint-Brieuc (French pronunciation: [abɛl d(ə) sɛ̃ bʁijø]) was a Roman Catholic prelate who served as Auxiliary Bishop of Reims (1483–?).

== Biography ==
Abel de Saint-Brieuc was ordained a priest in the Order of Preachers. On 22 Oct 1483, he was appointed by Pope Sixtus IV as Auxiliary Bishop of Reims and Titular Bishop of Dionysias. On 21 Dec 1483, he was consecrated bishop by Pierre Fridaricus, Bishop of Nisyros, with Orlando, Bishop of Vaison, and Basilio Gambone, Bishop of Ploaghe, serving as co-consecrators.
