= Uilliam Ó Fearghail =

Roman Catholic prelate (1480–1516)

Most Reverend Uilliam Ó Fearghail
- Bishop of Ardagh
- Church: Catholic Church
- Archdiocese: Diocese of Ardagh
- In office: 1480–1516
- Predecessor: Seaán Ó Fearghail
- Successor: Rory O'Malone

Orders
- Consecration: 11 August 1482 by Stephen Teglatius

Personal details
- Died: 1516

Uilliam Ó Fearghail (William O’Ferral; died 1516) was a Roman Catholic prelate: he served as Bishop of Ardagh (1480–1516).

== Biography ==
Uilliam Ó Fearghail was ordained a priest in the Order of Cistercians. On 4 Aug 1480, Uilliam Ó Fearghail was appointed by Pope Sixtus IV as Bishop of Ardagh. He was consecrated bishop on 11 August 1482. He served as Bishop of Ardagh until his death in 1516. While bishop, he served as principal co-consecrator of Michael Hildebrand, Archbishop of Riga (1484).

Catholic Church titles
Preceded by Seaán Ó Fearghail	Bishop of Ardagh; 1480–1516	Succeeded by Rory O'Malone
