= Marine Protected Area Capo Rizzuto =

Protected area in Italy (EUAP0166)

Coordinates: 38°53′30″N 17°05′55″E

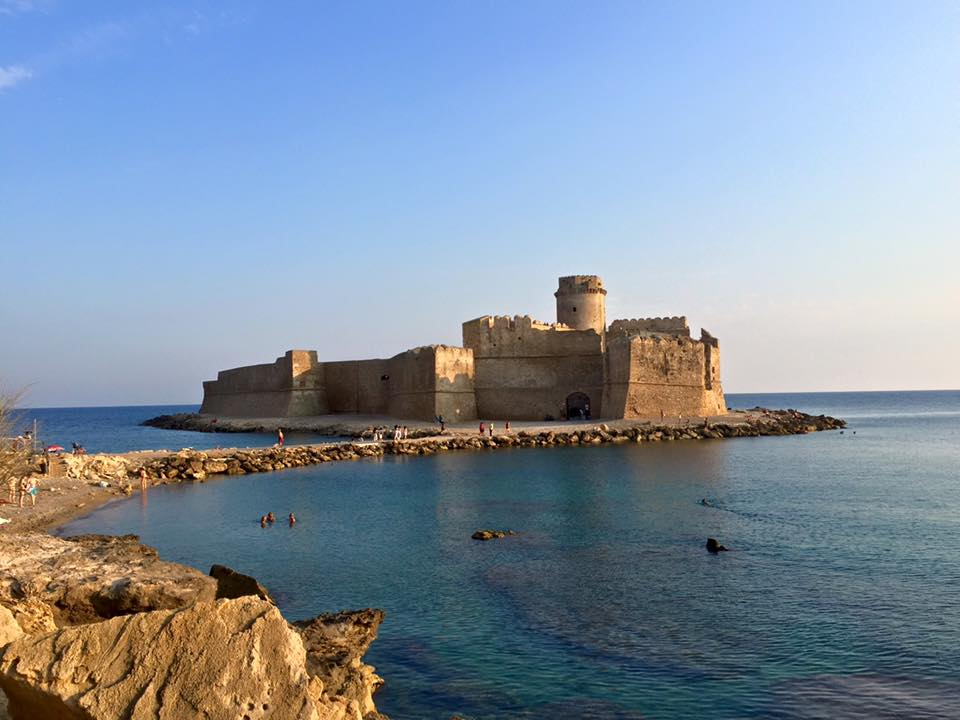
Le Castella Fortress in Le Castella is within the Marine Protected Area.

Area marina protetta Capo Rizzuto is a small scale coastal marine reserve located in the Italian province of Crotone, in the comuni of Isola Capo Rizzuto and Crotone. Its official centre is located at 38°58'N / 17°13'E.

It is divided into three zones, each with its own level of protection.

- Zone-A, Integral Reserve – Fully closed for all disturbing activities, including scuba diving, bathing, fishing and shipping. Only scientific research, emergency services and trips organised by the management board are allowed in the area.
- Zone-B, General Reserve – The zones directly surrounding the integral reserves. Most activities are allowed as long as they adhere to some basic limitations, e.g. no motor sailing faster than five knots, no anchoring or mooring. Fishing activities are limited to residential fishing with lines and rods.
- Zone-C, Partial Reserve – The remainder of the reserve adheres mostly to the same limitations as the general reserve but with a less stringent regime. Motor sailing is limited to ten knots.

The Capo Rizzuto area encompasses roughly 13,500 hectares (33,000 acres) of open water, bordering 37 kilometres (23 mi) of coastline. It is in the easternmost part of Calabria and leads into the waters of the Ionian Sea.

== Protection ==
The area is a Specially Protected Area under the Barcelona Convention and a number of national acts, most noticeably as a Natural Marine Protected Area (decree of 19 February 2002). The Italian Ministry of Environment is the supervising body, and day-to-day management is placed with the province of Crotone.

Its first protection came in 1982 when parts of the current reserve were one of the first of two marine protected sites in Italy. On 27 December 1991, the reserve was officially established.
