= Diego Cabeza de Vaca =

Bishop of Crotone

Most Reverend Diego Cabeza de Vaca
- Bishop of Crotone
- Church: Catholic Church
- Diocese: Diocese of Crotone
- In office: 1623–1625
- Predecessor: Carlo Catalani
- Successor: Niceforo Melisseno Comneno

Orders
- Consecration: 4 February 1624 by Giovanni Garzia Mellini

Personal details
- Died: December 1625 Crotone, Italy

Diego Cabeza de Vaca (died 1625) was a Roman Catholic prelate who served as Bishop of Crotone (1623–1625).

== Biography ==
A native of the diocese of Seville (Hispalis) in Spain, he was a doctor of theology and a Canon of the cathedral Chapter of Tuy (Tudensis) in Spain. He served as Visitor General of the bishop of Segovia. Cabeza de Vaca was a follower of Cardinal Antonio Zapata y Cisneros, who was Viceroy of Naples from 1620 to 1622.

On 20 November 1623, Diego Cabeza de Vaca was appointed during the papacy of Pope Urban VIII as Bishop of Crotone. On 4 February 1624, he was consecrated bishop by Giovanni Garzia Mellini, Cardinal-Priest of Santi Quattro Coronati, with Alessandro di Sangro, Archbishop of Benevento, and Agostino Morosini, Titular Archbishop of Damascus, serving as co-consecrators. He served as Bishop of Crotone until his death in December 1625.

== External links and additional sources ==
- Cheney, David M. "Archdiocese of Crotone-Santa Severina". Catholic-Hierarchy.org. (for Chronology of Bishops) ^{[self-published]}
- Chow, Gabriel. "Archdiocese of Crotone-Santa Severina". GCatholic.org. (for Chronology of Bishops) ^{[self-published]}

Catholic Church titles
Preceded by Carlo Catalani	Bishop of Crotone; 1623–1625	Succeeded by Niceforo Melisseno Comneno
