= Gerolamo Ubertino Provana =

Roman Catholic prelate

Most Reverend Gerolamo Ubertino Provana
- Bishop of Alba
- Church: Catholic Church
- Diocese: Diocese of Alba
- In office: 1692–1696
- Predecessor: Vittorio Nicolino della Chiesa
- Successor: Giuseppe Rottario

Orders
- Consecration: 30 June 1692 by Fabrizio Spada

Personal details
- Born: 1658 Nizza Monferrato, Italy
- Died: 16 August 1696 (aged 37–38) Alba, Italy

Gerolamo Ubertino Provana, C.R. (1658–1696) was a Roman Catholic prelate who served as Bishop of Alba (1692–1696).

== Biography ==
Gerolamo Ubertino Provana was born in Nizza Monferrato, Italy in 1658 and ordained a priest in the Congregation of Clerics Regular of the Divine Providence in 1674. On 25 June 1692, he was appointed during the papacy of Pope Innocent XII as Bishop of Alba. On 30 June 1692, he was consecrated bishop by Fabrizio Spada, Cardinal-Priest of San Crisogono with Michelangelo Mattei, Titular Archbishop of Hadrianopolis in Haemimonto, and Baldassare Cenci (seniore), Titular Archbishop of Larissa in Thessalia, serving as co-consecrators. He served as Bishop of Alba until his death on 16 August 1696.

== External links and additional sources ==
- Cheney, David M. "Diocese of Alba". Catholic-Hierarchy.org. (for Chronology of Bishops) ^{[self-published]}
- Chow, Gabriel. "Diocese of Alba (Italy)". GCatholic.org. (for Chronology of Bishops) ^{[self-published]}

Catholic Church titles
Preceded by Vittorio Nicolino della Chiesa	Bishop of Alba; 1692–1696	Succeeded by Giuseppe Rottario
