= Capo Rizzuto Lighthouse =

Lighthouse in Calabria, Italy

Capo Rizzuto
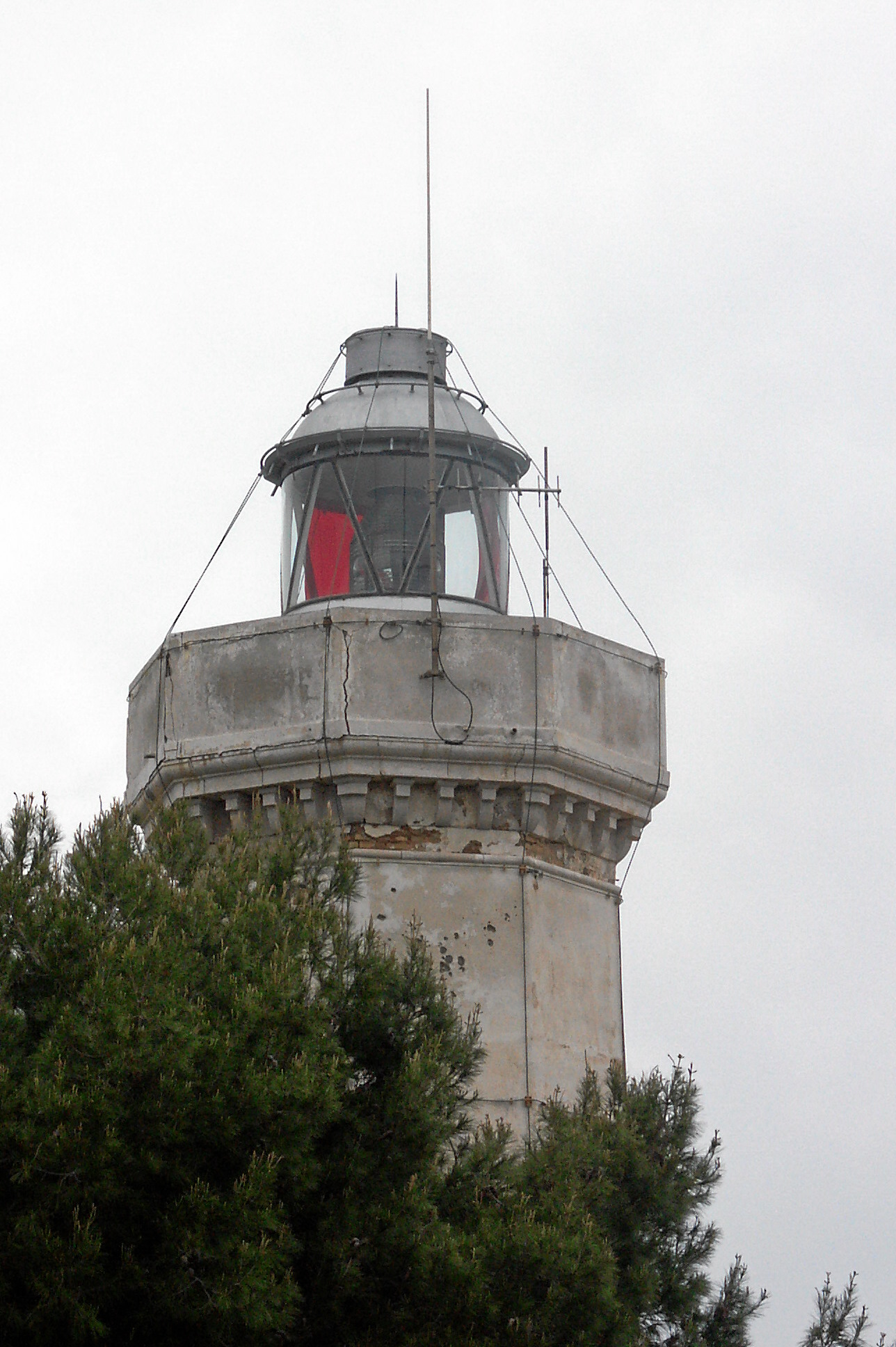
- Capo Rizzuto Lighthouse in 2009
- Location: Isola di Capo Rizzuto; Calabria; Italy
- Coordinates: 38°53′43″N 17°05′34″E

Tower
- Constructed: 1906
- Construction: masonry tower
- Automated: yes
- Height: 17 metres (56 ft)
- Shape: octagonal prism tower with balcony and lantern
- Markings: white tower, grey metallic lantern dome
- Power source: mains electricity
- Operator: Marina Militare

Light
- Focal height: 37 metres (121 ft)
- Lens: Type OF
- Intensity: AL 1000 W
- Range: main: 17 nautical miles (31 km; 20 mi) reserve: 11 nautical miles (20 km; 13 mi)
- Characteristic: L Fl (2) WR 10s.
- Italy no.: 3396 E.F.

Capo Rizzuto Lighthouse (Italian: Faro di Capo Rizzuto) is an active lighthouse located on the promontory with the same name in the municipality of Isola di Capo Rizzuto in Calabria on the Ionian Sea.

== Description ==
The lighthouse was built in 1906 and consists of a white octagonal prism masonry tower, 17 feet (5.2 m) high, with balcony and lantern, attached to the seaside front of a 1-storey white keeper's house. The lantern, painted in grey metallic, is positioned at 37 metres (121 ft) above sea level and emits two long white or red flashes, depending from the direction, in a 10 seconds period, visible up to a distance of 17 nautical miles (31 km; 20 mi). The lighthouse is completely automated and is operated by the Marina Militare with the identification code number 3396 E.F.

== See also ==
- List of lighthouses in Italy
- Isola di Capo Rizzuto
