= Heinrich Kratz =

Roman Catholic prelate

Most Reverend Heinrich Kratz
- Auxiliary Bishop of Naumburg
- Church: Catholic Church
- Archdiocese: Diocese of Naumburg
- In office: 1484–?

Orders
- Consecration: 22 February 1484 by Pierre Fridaricus

Heinrich Kratz was a Roman Catholic prelate who served as Auxiliary Bishop of Naumburg (1484–?).

== Biography ==
Heinrich Kratz was ordained a priest in the Order of Hospitallers. On 28 January 1484, he was appointed by Pope Sixtus IV as Auxiliary Bishop of Naumburg and Titular Bishop of Callipolis. On 22 February 1484, he was consecrated bishop by Pierre Fridaricus, Bishop of Nisyros, with Giuliano Maffei, Bishop of Bertinoro, and Christophe de Ragusa, Bishop of Modruš, serving as co-consecrators.
