= Vincenzo Agnello Suardi =

Most Reverend Vincenzo Agnello Suardi
- Bishop of Mantua
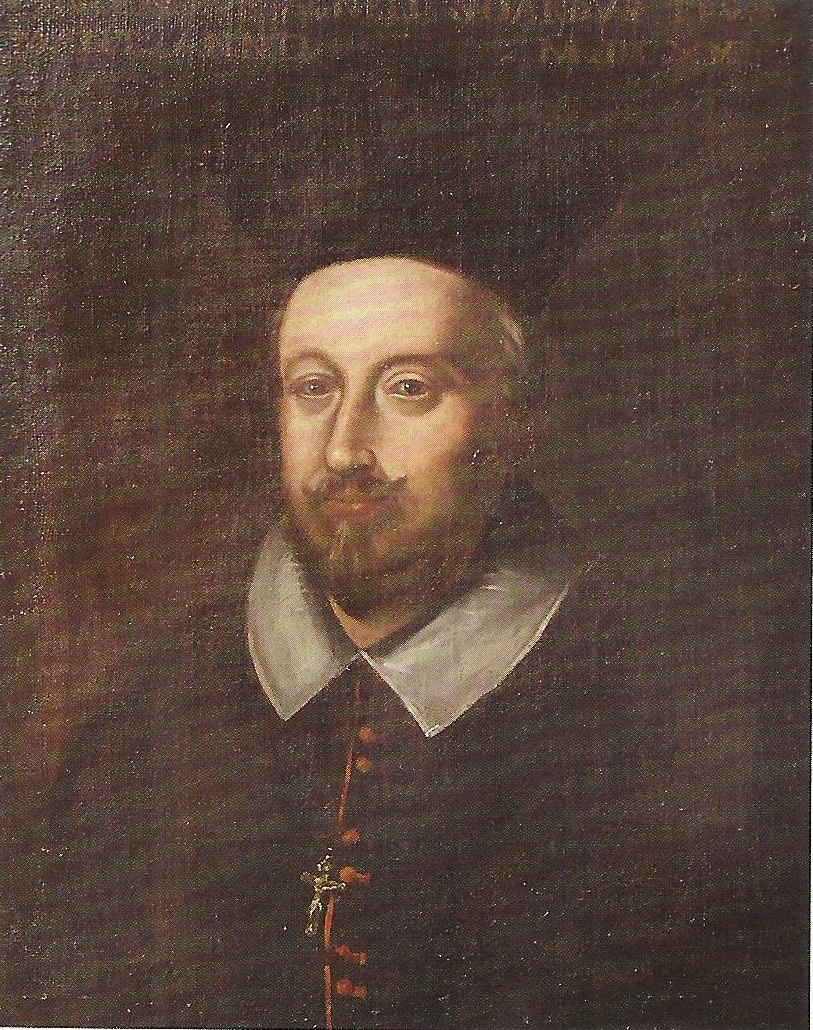
- Church: Catholic Church
- In office: 1616–1620
- Predecessor: Francesco Gonzaga
- Successor: Maffeo Vitale
- Previous post: Bishop of Alba (1616–1620)

Orders
- Consecration: 21 December 1616 by Giovanni Garzia Mellini

Personal details
- Born: 1582 Mantua, Italy
- Died: September 1644 (age 62) Mantua, Italy

Vincenzo Agnello Suardi (1582 – September 1644) was a Roman Catholic prelate who served as Bishop of Mantua (1620–1644) and Bishop of Alba (1616–1620).

== Biography ==
Vincenzo Agnello Suardi was born in Mantua, Italy in 1582. On 5 December 1616, he was appointed during the papacy of Pope Paul V as Bishop of Alba. On 21 December 1616, he was consecrated bishop by Giovanni Garzia Mellini, Cardinal-Priest of Santi Quattro Coronati, with Ulpiano Volpi, Archbishop Emeritus of Chieti, and Francesco Sacrati (cardinal), Titular Archbishop of Damascus. serving as co-consecrators. On 13 May 1619, he was appointed during the papacy of Pope Paul V as Bishop of Mantua; and succeeded on 2 March 1620. He served as Bishop of Mantua until his death in September 1644. While bishop, he was the principal co-consecrator of Ludovico Gonzaga (bishop), Bishop of Alba (1619); and Scipione Agnelli, Bishop of Casale Monferrato (1624).

== External links and additional sources ==
- Cheney, David M. "Diocese of Alba". Catholic-Hierarchy.org. (for Chronology of Bishops) ^{[self-published]}
- Chow, Gabriel. "Diocese of Alba (Italy)". GCatholic.org. (for Chronology of Bishops) ^{[self-published]}
- Cheney, David M. "Diocese of Mantova". Catholic-Hierarchy.org. (for Chronology of Bishops) ^{[self-published]}
- Chow, Gabriel. "Diocese of Mantova (Italy)". GCatholic.org. (for Chronology of Bishops) ^{[self-published]}

Catholic Church titles
| Preceded by Francesco Pendasio | Bishop of Alba; 1616–1620 | Succeeded by Ludovico Gonzaga (bishop) |
| Preceded by Francesco Gonzaga | Bishop of Mantua; 1620–1644 | Succeeded by Maffeo Vitale |
