= Giuseppe Rottario =

18th-century Roman Catholic bishop

Most Reverend Giuseppe Rottario
- Bishop of Alba
- Church: Catholic Church
- Diocese: Diocese of Alba
- In office: 1697–1720
- Predecessor: Gerolamo Ubertino Provana
- Successor: Francesco Vasco

Orders
- Ordination: 23 Mar 1681
- Consecration: 8 Apr 1697 by Domenico Maria Corsi

Personal details
- Born: 25 Sep 1657 Vicia, Italy
- Died: 4 Nov 1720 (age 63)

Giuseppe Rottario or Giuseppe Roverio (1657–1720) was a Roman Catholic prelate who served as Bishop of Alba (1697–1720).

== Biography ==
Giuseppe Rottario was born om 25 Sep 1657 in Vicia, Italy and ordained a priest on 23 Mar 1681. On 27 Mar 1697, he was appointed during the papacy of Pope Innocent XII as Bishop of Alba. On 8 Apr 1697, he was consecrated bishop by Domenico Maria Corsi, Bishop of Rimini, with Carlo Loffredo, Archbishop of Bari, and Miguel Antonio de Benavides y Piedrola, Bishop of Cartagena, serving as co-consecrators. He served as Bishop of Alba until his death on 4 Nov 1720.

== External links and additional sources ==
- Cheney, David M. "Diocese of Alba". Catholic-Hierarchy.org. (for Chronology of Bishops) ^{[self-published]}
- Chow, Gabriel. "Diocese of Alba (Italy)". GCatholic.org. (for Chronology of Bishops) ^{[self-published]}

Catholic Church titles
Preceded by Gerolamo Ubertino Provana	Bishop of Alba; 1697–1720	Succeeded by Francesco Vasco
