= Francesco Pendasio =

Catholic prelate (1571–1616)

Most Reverend Francesco Pendasio
- Church: Catholic Church
- Diocese: Diocese of Alba
- In office: 1605–1616
- Predecessor: Giovanni Anselmo Carminato
- Successor: Vincenzo Agnello Suardi

Orders
- Consecration: 10 August 1605 by Girolamo Bernerio

Personal details
- Born: 1571 Mantua, Italy
- Died: September 1616 (age 45) Alba, Italy

Francesco Pendasio (1571 – September 1616) was a Catholic prelate who served as Bishop of Alba (1605–1616).

== Biography ==
Francesco Pendasio was born in Mantua, Italy in 1571. On 18 July 1605, he was appointed during the papacy of Pope Paul V as Bishop of Alba. On 10 August 1605, he was consecrated bishop by Girolamo Bernerio, Cardinal-Bishop of Albano. He served as Bishop of Alba until his death in September 1616.

== External links and additional sources ==
- Cheney, David M. "Diocese of Alba". Catholic-Hierarchy.org. (for Chronology of Bishops) ^{[self-published]}
- Chow, Gabriel. "Diocese of Alba (Italy)". GCatholic.org. (for Chronology of Bishops) ^{[self-published]}

Catholic Church titles
Preceded by Giovanni Anselmo Carminato	Bishop of Alba; 1605–1616	Succeeded by Vincenzo Agnello Suardi
