= Giovanni Pietro Volpi =

Roman Catholic prelate

Most Reverend Giovanni Pietro Volpi
- Bishop of Novara
- Church: Catholic Church
- Diocese: Diocese of Novara
- In office: 1629–1636
- Predecessor: Ulpiano Volpi
- Successor: Antonio Tornielli
- Previous posts: Titular Bishop of Salona, (1622–1629); Auxiliary Bishop of Novara (1622–1629)

Orders
- Consecration: 12 June 1622 by Ludovico Ludovisi

Personal details
- Born: 15 May 1585 Como, Italy
- Died: 12 September 1636 (age 51) Novara, Italy

Giovanni Pietro Volpi (15 May 1585 – 12 September 1636) was a Roman Catholic prelate who served as Bishop of Novara (1629–1636), Titular Bishop of Salona (1622–1629), and Auxiliary Bishop of Novara (1622–1629).

== Biography ==
Giovanni Pietro Volpi was born in Como, Italy on 15 May 1585. Volpi served as Canon of the Cathedral of Como. On 23 May 1622, he was appointed during the papacy of Pope Gregory XV as Auxiliary Bishop of Novara and Titular Bishop of Salona. On 12 June 1622, he was consecrated bishop by Ludovico Ludovisi, Archbishop of Bologna with Galeazzo Sanvitale, Archbishop Emeritus of Bari-Canosa, and Ulpiano Volpi, Bishop of Novara, serving as co-consecrators. On 26 July 1624, he was appointed during the papacy of Pope Urban VIII as Coadjutor Bishop of Novara which was held at the time by his uncle, Ulpiano Volpi, who had duties in the Roman Curia. He succeeded to the bishopric on 10 March 1629. He served as Bishop of Novara until his death on 12 September 1636.

== External links and additional sources ==
- Cheney, David M. "Salona (Titular See)". Catholic-Hierarchy.org. (for Chronology of Bishops) ^{[self-published]}
- Chow, Gabriel. "Titular Episcopal See of Salona (Italy)". GCatholic.org. (for Chronology of Bishops) ^{[self-published]}
- Cheney, David M. "Diocese of Novara". Catholic-Hierarchy.org. (for Chronology of Bishops) ^{[self-published]}
- Chow, Gabriel. "Diocese of Novara (Italy)". GCatholic.org. (for Chronology of Bishops) ^{[self-published]}

Catholic Church titles
Preceded by	Auxiliary Bishop of Novara; 1622–1629	Succeeded by
Preceded by Etienne de Brito	Titular Bishop of Salona; 1622–1629	Succeeded by Giuliano Viviani
Preceded by Ulpiano Volpi	Bishop of Novara; 1629–1636	Succeeded by Antonio Tornielli
