= Antonio Tornielli =

Roman Catholic prelate

Most Reverend Antonio Tornielli
- Bishop of Novara
- Church: Catholic Church
- Diocese: Diocese of Novara
- In office: 1636–1650
- Predecessor: Giovanni Pietro Volpi
- Successor: Benedetto Odescalchi

Orders
- Consecration: 25 January 1637 by Antonio Marcello Barberini

Personal details
- Born: 27 January 1579 Novara, Italy
- Died: 8 March 1650 (aged 71) Novara, Italy

Antonio Tornielli (27 January 1579 – 8 March 1650) was a Roman Catholic prelate who served as Bishop of Novara (1636–1650).

== Biography ==
Antonio Tornielli was born in Novara, Italy. On 15 December 1636, he was appointed by Pope Urban VIII as Bishop of Novara. On 25 January 1637, he was consecrated bishop by Antonio Marcello Barberini, Cardinal-Priest of Sant'Onofrio with Faustus Poli, Titular Archbishop of Amasea, and Celso Zani, Bishop of Città della Pieve, as co-consecrators. He served as Bishop of Novara until his death on 8 March 1650.

== External links and additional sources ==
- Cheney, David M. "Diocese of Novara". Catholic-Hierarchy.org. (for Chronology of Bishops) ^{[self-published]}
- Chow, Gabriel. "Diocese of Novara (Italy)". GCatholic.org. (for Chronology of Bishops) ^{[self-published]}

Catholic Church titles
Preceded by Giovanni Pietro Volpi	Bishop of Novara; 1636–1650	Succeeded by Benedetto Odescalchi
