= Pierre Fridaricus =

Most Reverend Pierre Fridaricus
- Bishop of Nisyros
- Church: Catholic Church
- Diocese: Diocese of Nisyros

Pierre Fridaricus was a Roman Catholic prelate who served as Bishop of Nisyros, one of the Greek islands.

== Biography ==
Pierre Fridaricus served as Bishop of Nisyros in the late 1400s.

While bishop, he was the principal consecrator of George Brann (bishop), Bishop of Dromore (1483); Abel de Saint-Brieuc, Auxiliary Bishop of Reims (1483); Heinrich Kratz, Auxiliary Bishop of Naumburg (1484); Michael Hildebrand, Archbishop of Riga (1484); and Jean Orient, Bishop of Terralba (1485). He was also the principal co-consecrator of John Sherwood, Bishop of Durham (1484); George Browne, Bishop of Dunkeld (1484); and Bishop Jean (1484).
