= Pedro Ruiz de la Camera =

Spanish Roman Catholic prelate

Most Reverend Pedro Ruiz de la Camera
- Auxiliary Bishop of Toledo
- Church: Catholic Church
- Archdiocese: Archdiocese of Toledo
- In office: 1524

Personal details
- Died: Toledo, Spain

Pedro Ruiz de la Camera was a Roman Catholic prelate who served as Auxiliary Bishop of Toledo (1524).

De la Camera was ordained a priest in the Order of Preachers. On 18 April 1524, he was appointed during the papacy of Pope Clement VII as Auxiliary Bishop of Toledo and Titular Bishop of Salona.

== External links and additional sources ==
- Cheney, David M. "Salona (Titular See)". Catholic-Hierarchy.org. (for Chronology of Bishops) ^{[self-published]}
- Chow, Gabriel. "Titular Episcopal See of Salona (Italy)". GCatholic.org. (for Chronology of Bishops) ^{[self-published]}
