= Giovanni Orient =

Most Reverend Giovanni Orient
- Bishop of Terralba
- Church: Catholic Church
- Diocese: Diocese of Terralba
- In office: 1484–1503
- Predecessor: Giovanni Pellis
- Successor: None

Orders
- Consecration: 16 Jan 1485 by Pierre Fridaricus

Personal details
- Died: 1503 Terralba, Italy

Giovanni Orient (also Jean Orient; died 1503) was a Roman Catholic prelate who served as Bishop of Terralba (1484–1503).

== Biography ==
Giovanni Orient was ordained a priest in the Order of Friars Minor. On 22 Sep 1484, he was appointed by Pope Sixtus IV as Bishop of Terralba. On 16 Jan 1485, he was consecrated by Pierre Fridaricus, Bishop of Nisyros. He served as Bishop of Terralba until his death in 1503.

Catholic Church titles
| Preceded by Giovanni Pellis | Bishop of Terralba; 1484–1503 | Succeeded by Diocese suppressed |
