= Ludovico Gonzaga (bishop) =

Italian Roman Catholic prelate

Most Reverend Ludovico Gonzaga
- Bishop of Alba
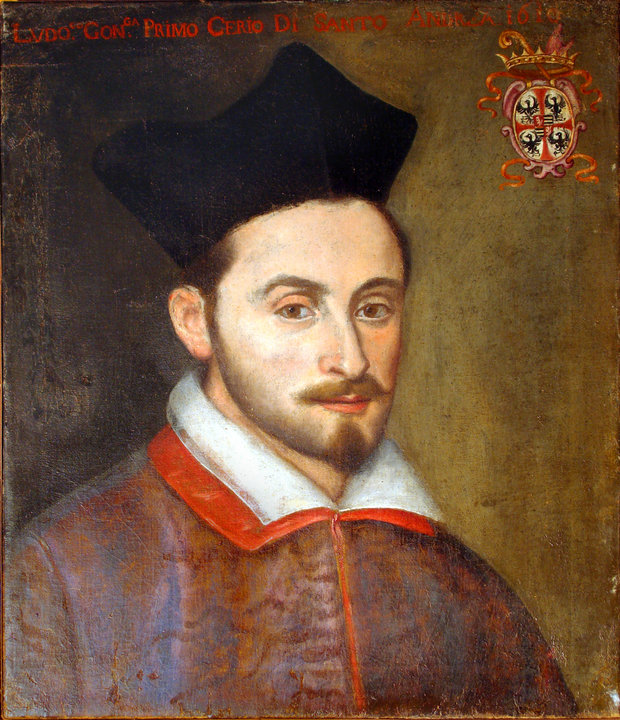
- Roman Catholic prelate
- Church: Catholic Church
- Diocese: Diocese of Alba
- In office: 1619–1632
- Predecessor: Vincenzo Agnello Suardi
- Successor: Giovanni Francesco Gandolfo

Orders
- Consecration: 18 August 1619 by Benedetto Giustiniani

Personal details
- Born: 1588 Mantua, Italy
- Died: 1632 (age 44) Alba, Italy

Ludovico Gonzaga (1588–1632) was a Roman Catholic prelate who served as Bishop of Alba (1619–1632). By birth, he was member of the House of Gonzaga.

== Biography ==
Ludovico Gonzaga was born in Mantua, Italy in 1588 as the son of Marchese Prospero Gonzaga di Luzzara (1543-1614) and his wife, Isabella Gonzaga di Sabbioneta and Bozzolo (b. 1555). On 12 August 1619, he was appointed during the papacy of Pope Paul V as Bishop of Alba. On 18 August 1619, he was consecrated bishop by Benedetto Giustiniani, Cardinal-Bishop of Sabina, with Ulpiano Volpi, Archbishop Emeritus of Chieti, and Vincenzo Agnello Suardi, Coadjutor Bishop of Mantova, serving as co-consecrators. He served as Bishop of Alba until his death in 1632.

== External links and additional sources ==
- Cheney, David M. "Diocese of Alba". Catholic-Hierarchy.org. (for Chronology of Bishops) ^{[self-published]}
- Chow, Gabriel. "Diocese of Alba (Italy)". GCatholic.org. (for Chronology of Bishops) ^{[self-published]}

Catholic Church titles
Preceded by Vincenzo Agnello Suardi	Bishop of Alba; 1619–1632	Succeeded by Giovanni Francesco Gandolfo
