= Giuseppe Maria Feroni =

Italian cardinal (1693–1767)

Giuseppe Maria Feroni (30 April 1693 – 15 November 1767) was a Cardinal of the Roman Catholic church, and camerlengo from 1760–1761.

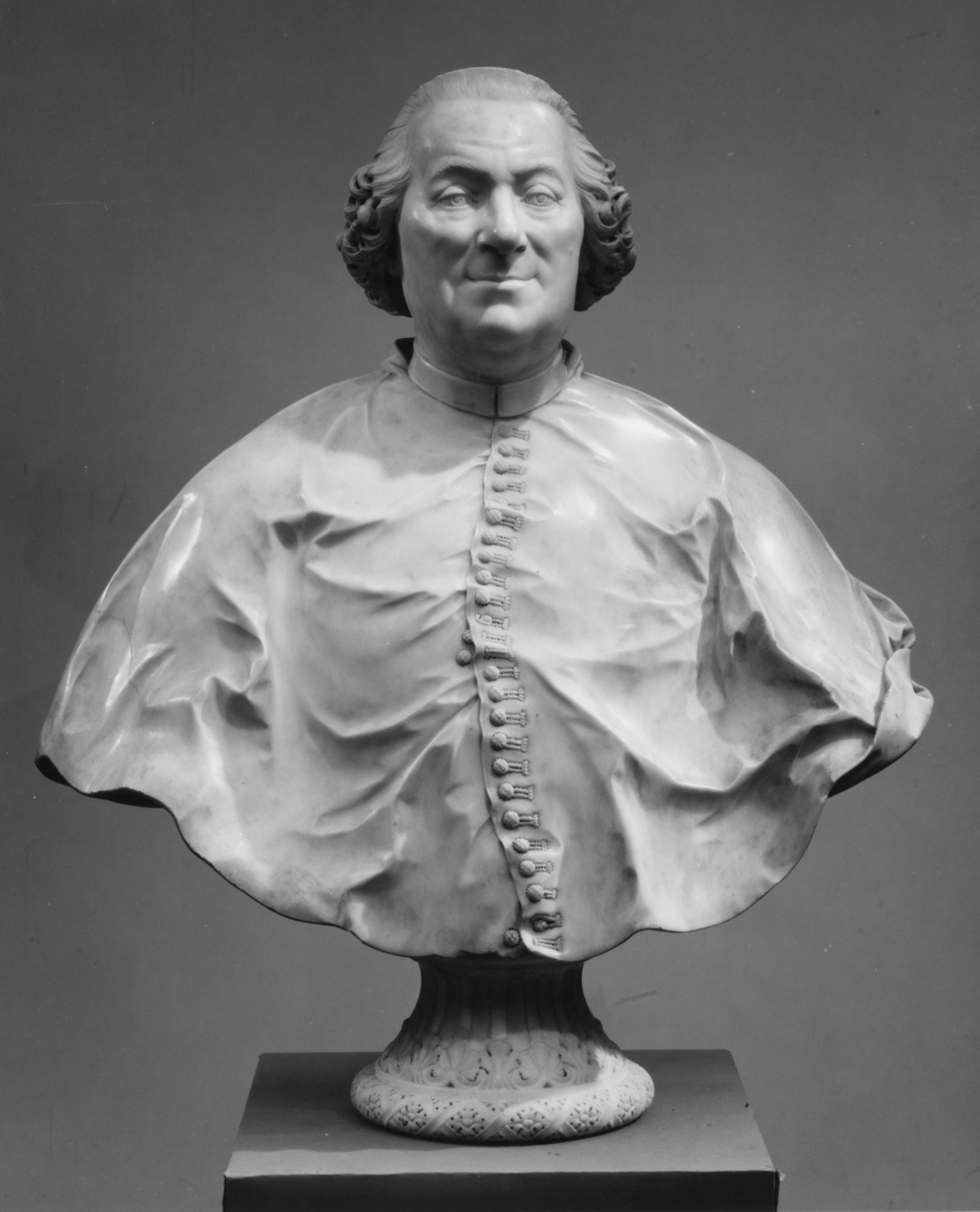
Cardinal Giuseppe Maria Feroni.

A famous bust of him by Andre-Jean Lebrun is in the collection of the Metropolitan Museum of Art.

== Early life and education ==
Feroni came from the wealthy noble family of the Marquises of Bellavista. He was the son of Marchese Fabio Feroni and Costanza della Stufa.

He studied at the Collegio Clementino in Rome, the Pontifical Diplomatic Academy, and La Sapienza University, where in 1716 he was awarded his doctorate. On 16 January 1716 he entered the Roman prelature as a candidate for the Apostolic Protonotary, and on 23 January that year he became a clerk at the Apostolic Signatura.

== Career ==
He was ordained a priest on 22 October 1719. Pope Clement XI appointed him a canon of the Lateran Basilica. He was appointed a titular archbishop on 10 May 1728. Pope Benedict XIII ordained him to the episcopate on 30 May 1728 in St. Peter's Basilica. His Co-Consecrators were Francesco Scipione Maria Borghese, Titular Archbishop of Traianopolis, and Nicola Saverio Santamaria, Titular Bishop of Cyrene.

In the consistory of 26 November 1753 he was appointed cardinal priest and was installed on 10 December 1753 as Titular Archbishop of Damascus in the titular church San Pancrazio. He participated in the Conclave of 1758, which chose Pope Clement XIII.

From 28 January 1760 to 16 February 1761 he was Camerlengo of the College of Cardinals. After the death of Cardinal Fortunato Tamburini on 9 August 1761, Feroni became prefect of the Congregation of the Rites. On 17 December 1764 he received the titular church Santa Cecilia as his see. In autumn 1765 he moved to Siena, where he was abbot of the Abbey of San Galgano. (By that time, the abbey was already in decline, so this was probably his retirement home).

== Death ==
Feroni died on 15 November 1767 in Rome of a kidney disease. His final resting place with an elegant tomb is in his titular church Santa Cecilia in Trastevere.

== Sources ==
- Cheney, David M. "Giuseppe Maria Cardinal Feroni". Catholic-Hierarchy.org. (for Chronology of Bishops) ^{[self-published]}
- FIU website article. Accessed 29 June 2018
