= Alessandro di Sangro =

17th-century Roman Catholic cleric

Most Reverend Alessandro di Sangro
- Archbishop of Benevento; Titular Patriarch of Alexandria
- Church: Catholic Church
- Archdiocese: Archdiocese of Benevento
- In office: 1616–1633
- Predecessor: Pompeio Arrigoni
- Successor: Agostino Oreggi

Orders
- Ordination: 8 August 1604 by Leonard Abel
- Consecration: 10 August 1604 by Camillo Borghese

Personal details
- Died: 18 February 1633 Benevento, Italy

Alessandro di Sangro (died 18 February 1633) was a Roman Catholic prelate who served as Archbishop of Benevento (1616–1633) and Titular Patriarch of Alexandria (1604–1633)

== Biography ==
On 2 August 1604, Alessandro di Sangro was appointed during the papacy of Pope Clement VIII as Titular Patriarch of Alexandria and ordained a priest on 8 August 1604 by Leonard Abel, Titular Bishop of Sidon. On 10 August 1604, he was consecrated bishop by Camillo Borghese, Cardinal-Priest of San Crisogono, with Fabio Biondi (bishop), Titular Patriarch of Jerusalem, and Giuseppe Ferrerio, Archbishop of Urbino, serving as co-consecrators. On 2 May 1616, he was appointed during the papacy of Pope Paul V as Archbishop of Benevento. On 2 Apr 1621, he was appointed during the papacy of Pope Gregory XV as Apostolic Nuncio to Spain, position he held until 23 Jun 1622. He served as Archbishop of Benevento until his death on 18 February 1633.

== Episcopal succession ==
Episcopal succession of Alessandro di Sangro

While bishop, he was the principal co-consecrator of:

- Pedro Ruiz Valdivieso, Archbishop of Messina (1609);
- Gennaro Filomarino, Bishop of Calvi Risorta (1623);
- Giulio Antonio Santoro, Archbishop of Cosenza (1624);
- Diego Cabeza de Vaca, Bishop of Crotone (1624); and
- Alexander Liparuli, Bishop of Guardialfiera (1624).

== External links and additional sources ==
- Cheney, David M. "Alexandria {Alessandria} (Titular See)". Catholic-Hierarchy.org. (for Chronology of Bishops) ^{[self-published]}
- Chow, Gabriel. "Titular Patriarchal See of Alexandria (Egypt)". GCatholic.org. (for Chronology of Bishops) ^{[self-published]}
- Cheney, David M. "Archdiocese of Benevento". Catholic-Hierarchy.org. (for Chronology of Bishops) ^{[self-published]}
- Chow, Gabriel. "Archdiocese of Benevento (Italy)". GCatholic.org. (for Chronology of Bishops) ^{[self-published]}

Catholic Church titles
Preceded by Séraphin Olivier-Razali	Titular Patriarch of Alexandria; 1604–1633	Succeeded by Honoratus Caetani
Preceded by Pompeio Arrigoni	Archbishop of Benevento; 1616–1630	Succeeded by Agostino Oreggi
Preceded by Francesco Cennini de' Salamandri	Apostolic Nuncio to Spain; 1621–1622	Succeeded by Innocenzo Massimi
