= Agostino Oreggi =

- cardinal priest of S. Sisto
- Church: Catholic Church
- See: Archbishop of Benevento
- Appointed: 28 November 1633
- Term ended: 12 July 1635
- Predecessor: Alessandro di Sangro
- Successor: Vincenzo Maculani

Orders
- Consecration: 31 December 1633 (Bishop) by Antonio Marcello Barberini
- Created cardinal: 28 November 1633 by Pope Urban VIII

Personal details
- Born: 1577 Santa Sofia, Italy,
- Died: July 12, 1635 (aged 57–58) Benevento
- Buried: Benevento Cathedral

Agostino Oreggi (1577 – 12 July 1635) was a Catholic theologian and cardinal. As personal theologian of Pope Urban VIII, he was involved in the Galileo affair.

== Life ==
Agostino Oreggi was born in 1577 in the little town of Santa Sofia, in the Grand Duchy of Tuscany near the borders with Romagna. His parents were from Bironico in the canton of Ticino in Switzerland. He moved to Rome in 1594 for studying. With the support of Cardinal Roberto Bellarmino, he graduated in philosophy and theology in the Collegio Romano held by the Jesuits, and he earned also a doctorate in utroque iure. He became the "personal theologian" of Card Bellarmino.

In 1605, already a priest, Oreggi moved to Faenza where he taught and entered in contact with Maffeo Barberini, Cardinal legate of the near Bologna from 1611 to 1614. He remained in service of Maffeo Barberini as his almoner and theologian.

A turning point in the life of Agostino Oreggi was the elevation of Maffeo Barberini to the papacy as Pope Urban VIII in August 1623. In January 1624, he became Consultor (judge) of the Holy Office and member of the Congregation of the Council. He worked with his colleagues of Congregation of Propaganda Fide in publishing a rebuttal of Islamic doctrine in 1625 and in 1630 to permit the Jesuits to evangelize Japan. In 1633, he was part of a committee that studied a reshape of the dioceses in Irland, due to the persecutions suffered by the Catholics there.

Oreggi, together with Melchior Inchofer and Zaccaria Pasqualigo, studied the Dialogue Concerning the Two Chief World Systems of Galileo Galilei, and certified that, with the publishing of such book, Galileo did violate the order received in 1616 not to hold, teach, or defend that the sun stands still at the center of the world and the earth moves.

Oreggi was created cardinal priest with the title of S. Sisto in the consistory of 28 November 1633, and on the same day he was appointed Archbishop of Benevento. He died in Benevento on 12 July 1635 and was buried in that cathedral.

== Works ==
Among Oreggi's works are: De Deo uno tractatus primo (1629); De individuo sacratissimae Trinitatis mysterio; De angelis; De opere sex dierum, a study on the first five days of creation supporting the idea that the knowledge of the man about the physical reality is uncertain; De sacrosancto incarnationis mysterio; Aristotelis vera de rationalis animae immortalitate sententia (1631), about the orthodoxy of the Aristotle's doctrine on the human soul.
