= Pier Francesco Meglia =

Italian prelate

His Eminence Pier Francesco Meglia
- Cardinal-Priest of Santi Silvestro e Martino ai Monti
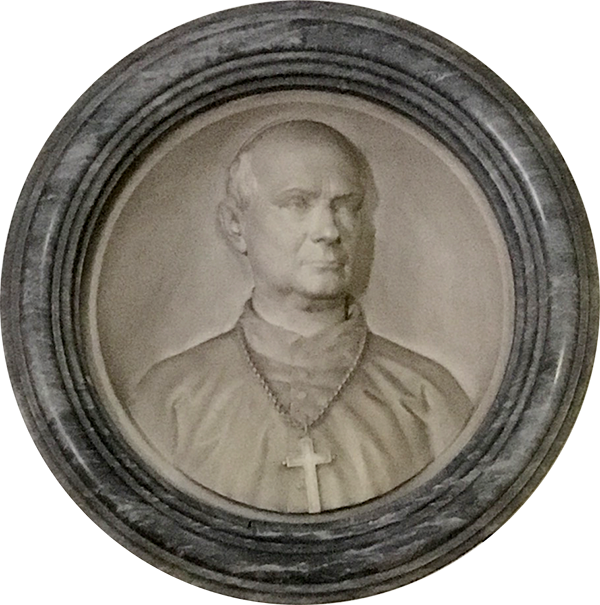
- Church: Roman Catholic Church
- Appointed: 27 February 1880
- Term ended: 31 March 1883
- Predecessor: Antonio Benedetto Antonucci
- Successor: Luigi Giordani
- Previous posts: Titular Archbishop of Damascus (1864-79); Apostolic Delegate to Mexico (1864-66); Apostolic Nuncio to Bavaria (1866-74); Apostolic Nuncio to France (1874-79)

Orders
- Ordination: 24 September 1836
- Consecration: 25 September 1864 by Pope Pius IX
- Created cardinal: 19 September 1879 by Pope Leo XIII
- Rank: Cardinal-Priest

Personal details
- Born: Pier Francesco Meglia; 3 November 1810 Santo Stefano al Mare, Kingdom of Sardinia
- Died: 31 March 1883 (aged 72) Rome, Kingdom of Italy
- Parents: Stefano Meglia; Maria Caterina Garibaldi
- Education: Sapienza University of Rome
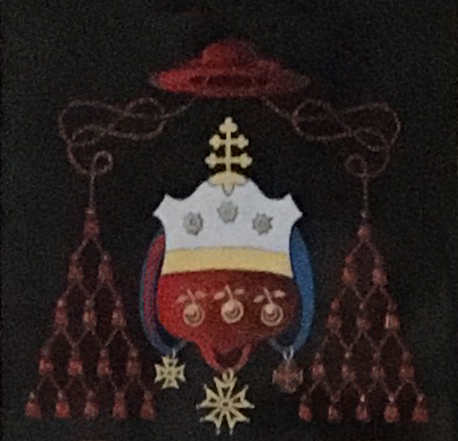
- Coat of arms

Pier Francesco Meglia (3 November 1810 – 31 March 1883) was an Italian prelate of the Catholic Church, who spent his career in the diplomatic service of the Holy See. He was made a cardinal in 1879.

== Biography ==
Pier Francesco Meglia was born in Santo Stefano al Mare on 3 November 1810. He studied at the seminaries of Genoa and Savona and then in Rome at La Sapienza University, where he earned a doctorate in civil and canon law on 23 May 1843.

He was ordained a priest in Rome on 24 September 1836.

He entered the diplomatic service of the Holy See. His early postings included stints as secretary of the nunciature in Naples at the court of the Kingdom of the Two Sicilies, auditor and then chargé d'affaires of the nunciature in France.

He was named titular archbishop of Damascus on 22 September 1864. He received his episcopal consecration on 25 September 1864 from Pope Pius IX. He was appointed apostolic delegate to Mexico on 1 October 1864 when the Holy See and the Mexican government were at loggerheads. Recent legislation calling for the seizure of Church property, the abolition of religious orders, and freedom of religion was awaiting only promulgation by the emperor. Emperor Maximilian I hoped to negotiate a compromise concordat while the Holy See sought the full restoration of the status quo ante. Efforts at negotiation collapsed by yearend, and the reform laws were decreed in February. Meglia delayed his departure until May, but took the nunciature's archives with him.

His next assignment was Apostolic Nuncio to the Kingdom of Bavaria on 26 October 1866.

He was named Apostolic Nuncio to France on 10 July 1874. He crowned the statue of Our Lady of Lourdes on 3 July 1876.

Pope Leo XIII made him a cardinal of the order of cardinal priests on 19 September 1879. He received his red galero and the title of Santi Silvestro e Martino ai Monti on 27 February 1880.

He was made a member of the Council for the Administration of the Wealth of the Apostolic See on 21 December 1880.

He died in Rome on 31 March 1883.
