= Le Castella =

La Castella
- Frazione
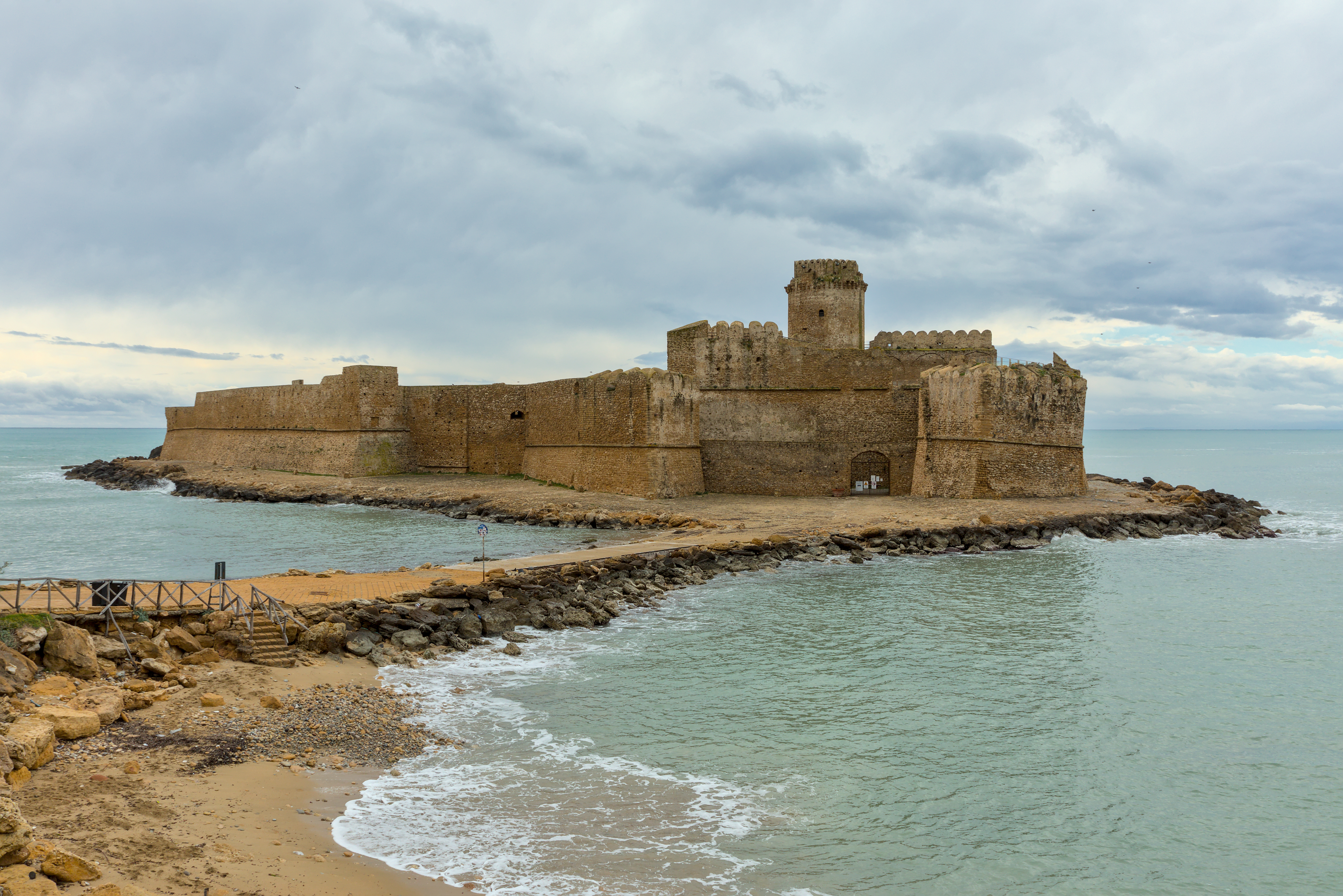
- View of the castle of Le Castella

- Location of La Castella in Italy
- Coordinates: 38°54′32″N 17°1′24″E
- Country: Italy
- Region: Calabria
- Province: Crotone (SI)
- Comune: Isola di Capo Rizzuto
- Elevation: 11 m (36 ft)

Population
  - Total: 1,103
- Time zone: UTC+1 (CET)
  - Summer (DST): UTC+2 (CEST)

Le Castella, also known as Punta Le Castella, is a village in Calabria, southern Italy, administratively a frazione of the comuni of Isola di Capo Rizzuto, province of Crotone.

It is located on the Ionian coast of Calabria, at the eastern end of the Gulf of Squillace, 20 km from Crotone and 40 km from Catanzaro.

A coastal village best known for its sea-surrounded fortress and a shoreline of varied beaches and cliffs. Its rich marine flora and fauna are protected within the Marine Protected Area Capo Rizzuto, the largest in Italy.

== Etymology ==
The name Le Castella has ancient origins, possibly linked to Roman settlers after the Second Punic War or to an earlier settlement attributed to Hannibal. Throughout the Middle Ages and Renaissance, maps and documents mention it under various names such as Castella, Castellum ad Mare, Castelle and Torre di Annibale. The modern toponym became established between the late Middle Ages and the following centuries, though historical sources show a wide variety of forms before stabilizing.

== History ==
Le Castella has origins rooted in myth and legend, often linked to Homer's Odyssey and the Japygian promontories. Archaeological evidence suggests settlements dating back to the 4th–3rd centuries BC, while tradition connects the site to Hannibal during the Second Punic War. Following his retreat, the Romans established a colony of about 3,000 settlers, giving rise to the first stable settlement named Castra. Ancient sources also mention nearby islands once admired for their beauty.

During the Middle Ages, Le Castella came under Arab control before becoming a thriving settlement with churches, officials, and a local universitates. From the 14th to 16th centuries it followed the fate of the Kingdom of Naples, taking part in events such as the battle of Le Castella. The fortress, known as Castellorum maris, passed between noble families and the crown, undergoing major reconstruction under the Aragonese.

From the 16th to 18th centuries, the village and fortress suffered repeated Ottoman Empire raids, including the 1536 attack by Hayreddin Barbarossa, who captured Giovanni Dionigi Galeni (later known as Uluç Ali Paşa). These incursions led to a long decline, and in 1644 the settlement was abandoned by royal order. Gradual repopulation began in the late 17th century, with the fortress serving as a refuge for nearby inhabitants.

In the modern era, Le Castella became a minor settlement within the Kingdom of the Two Sicilies and later Italy. The 20th century saw urban expansion after land reforms, and the village gained visibility in the 1960s when it was chosen as a filming location for movies such as For Love and Gold directed by Mario Monicelli and The Gospel According to St. Matthew by Pier Paolo Pasolini.
