= Sigismund Pirchan von Rosenberg =

Most Reverend Sigismund Pirchan von Rosenberg
- Auxiliary Bishop of Passau; Titular Bishop of Salona
- Church: Catholic Church
- Diocese: Diocese of Passau
- In office: 1441–1472

Personal details
- Born: 1389 Rožmberk nad Vltavou, Bohemia
- Died: 15 June 1472 (age 83) Enns, Austria

Sigismund Pirchan von Rosenberg, O. Cist. (1389–1472) was a Roman Catholic prelate who served as Auxiliary Bishop of Passau (1441–1472).

== Biography ==
Sigismund Pirchan von Rosenberg was born in 1389 and ordained a priest in the Cistercian Order. In 1441, he was appointed during the papacy of Pope Eugene IV as Auxiliary Bishop of Passau and Titular Bishop of Salona. He served as Auxiliary Bishop of Passau until his death on 15 June 1472.

== External links and additional sources ==
- Cheney, David M. "Salona (Titular See)". Catholic-Hierarchy.org. (for Chronology of Bishops) ^{[self-published]}
- Chow, Gabriel. "Titular Episcopal See of Salona (Italy)". GCatholic.org. (for Chronology of Bishops) ^{[self-published]}
