= Giulio Antonio Santoro =

Italian Roman Catholic prelate

Most Reverend Giulio Antonio Santoro
- Archbishop of Cosenza
- Church: Catholic Church
- Archdiocese: Archdiocese of Cosenza
- In office: 1624–1638
- Predecessor: Paolo Emilio Santori
- Successor: Martino Alfieri

Orders
- Consecration: 4 February 1624 by Giovanni Garzia Mellini

Personal details
- Born: 1580 Caserta, Italy
- Died: 28 September 1638 (age 58) Cosenza, Italy

Giulio Antonio Santoro (1580 – 28 September 1638) was a Roman Catholic prelate who served as Archbishop of Cosenza (1624–1638).

== Biography ==
Giulio Antonio Santoro was born in Caserta, Italy. On 29 January 1624, he was appointed during the papacy of Pope Urban VIII as Archbishop of Cosenza. On 4 February 1624, he was consecrated bishop by Giovanni Garzia Mellini, Cardinal-Priest of Santi Quattro Coronati, with Alessandro di Sangro, Archbishop of Benevento, and Agostino Morosini, Titular Archbishop of Damascus, serving as co-consecrators. He served as Archbishop of Cosenza until his death on 28 September 1638. While bishop, he was the principal co-consecrator of Consalvo Caputo, Bishop of San Marco (1630).

== External links and additional sources ==
- Cheney, David M. "Archdiocese of Cosenza-Bisignano". Catholic-Hierarchy.org. (for Chronology of Bishops) ^{[self-published]}
- Chow, Gabriel. "Metropolitan Archdiocese of Cosenza-Bisignano (Italy)". GCatholic.org. (for Chronology of Bishops) ^{[self-published]}

Catholic Church titles
Preceded by Paolo Emilio Santori	Archbishop of Cosenza; 1624–1638	Succeeded by Martino Alfieri
