= Andrea Giustiniani =

Most Reverend Andrea Giustiniani
- Bishop of Isola
- Church: Catholic Church
- In office: 1614–1617
- Predecessor: Girolamo Palazzuoli
- Successor: Giovanni Antonio Massimo

Orders
- Consecration: 30 November 1614 by Giovanni Garzia Mellini

Personal details
- Born: 22 December 1572 Ajaccio, France
- Died: 27 November 1617 (age 44) Isola, Italy

Andrea Giustiniani, O.P. (22 December 1572 – 27 November 1617) was a Catholic prelate who served as Bishop of Isola (1614–1617).

== Biography ==
Andrea Giustiniani was born on 22 December 1572 in Ajaccio, France, and ordained a priest in the Order of Preachers. On 24 November 1614, he was appointed during the papacy of Pope Paul V as Bishop of Isola. On 30 November 1614, he was consecrated bishop by Giovanni Garzia Mellini, Cardinal-Priest of Santi Quattro Coronati, with Galeazzo Sanvitale, Archbishop Emeritus of Bari-Canosa, and Ulpiano Volpi, Archbishop of Chieti, serving as co-consecrators. He served as Bishop of Isola until his death on 27 November 1617.

== External links and additional sources ==
- Cheney, David M. "Diocese of Isola". Catholic-Hierarchy.org. (for Chronology of Bishops) ^{[self-published]}
- Chow, Gabriel. "Titular Episcopal See of Isola (Italy)". GCatholic.org. (for Chronology of Bishops) ^{[self-published]}

Catholic Church titles
Preceded by Girolamo Palazzuoli	Bishop of Isola; 1614–1617	Succeeded by Giovanni Antonio Massimo
