= Maffeo Vitale =

Bishop of Mantua

Most Reverend Maffeo Vitale
- Bishop of Mantua
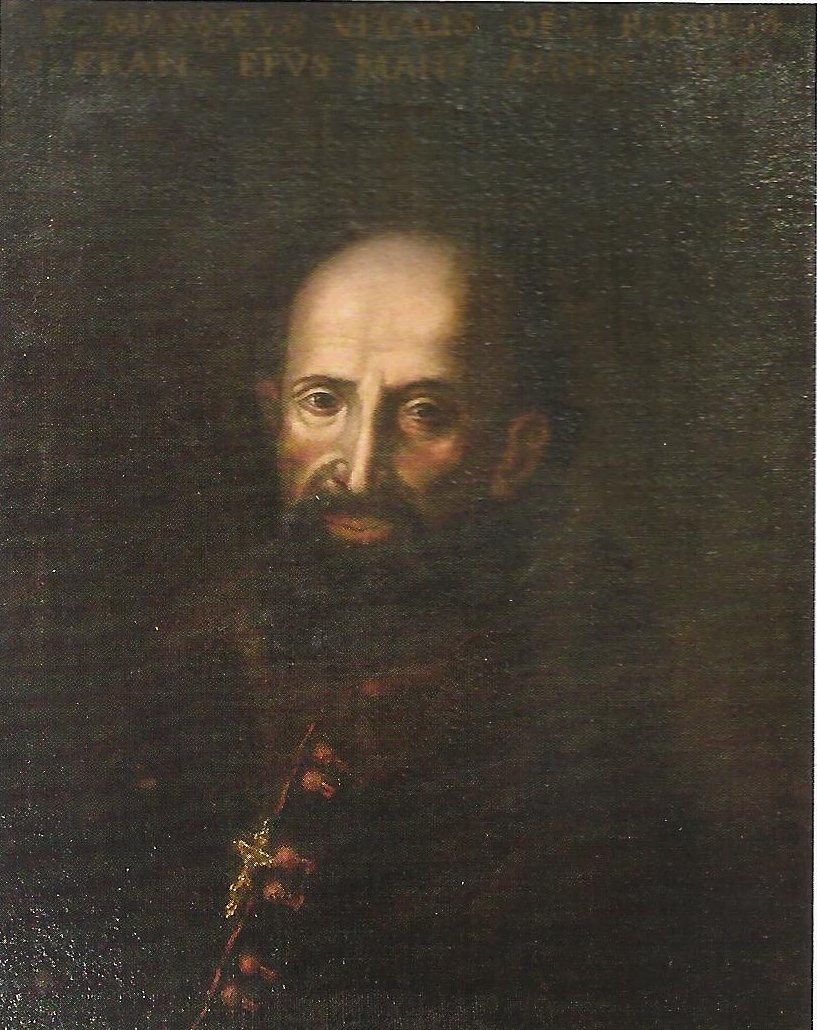
- Church: Catholic Church
- Diocese: Diocese of Mantua
- In office: 1646–1669
- Predecessor: Vincenzo Agnello Suardi
- Successor: Ferdinando Tiberius Gonzaga

Orders
- Consecration: 11 February 1646 by Giovanni Giacomo Panciroli

Personal details
- Died: 23 June 1669 Mantua, Italy

Maffeo Vitale, O.F.M. (died 23 June 1669) was a Roman Catholic prelate who served as Bishop of Mantua (1646–1669).

== Biography ==
Maffeo Vitale was ordained a priest in the Order of Friars Minor. On 5 February 1646, he was appointed during the papacy of Pope Innocent X as Bishop of Mantua. On 11 February 1646, he was consecrated bishop by Giovanni Giacomo Panciroli, Cardinal-Priest of Santo Stefano al Monte Celio, with Alfonso Gonzaga, Titular Archbishop of Rhodus, and Girolamo Farnese, Titular Archbishop of Patrae, serving as co-consecrators. He served as Bishop of Mantua until his death on 23 June 1669.

While bishop, he was the principal co-consecrator of Benedetto Odescalchi, Bishop of Novara (1651); and Rinaldo d'Este, Bishop of Reggio Emilia (1651).

== External links and additional sources ==
- Cheney, David M. "Diocese of Mantova". Catholic-Hierarchy.org. (for Chronology of Bishops) ^{[self-published]}
- Chow, Gabriel. "Diocese of Mantova (Italy)". GCatholic.org. (for Chronology of Bishops) ^{[self-published]}

Catholic Church titles
Preceded by Vincenzo Agnello Suardi	Bishop of Mantua; 1646–1669	Succeeded by Ferdinando Tiberius Gonzaga
