= Agostino Morosini =

Roman Catholic prelate in 17th Century

Most Reverend Agostino Morosini
- Titular Archbishop of Damascus
- Church: Catholic Church
- In office: 1621–1632?
- Predecessor: Francesco Sacrati (cardinal)
- Successor: Antonio Sotomayor

Orders
- Consecration: 1 June 1621 by Ulpiano Volpi

Agostino Morosini was a Roman Catholic prelate who served as Titular Archbishop of Damascus (1621–1632?).

== Biography ==
On 17 May 1621, Agostino Morosini was appointed during the papacy of Pope Gregory XV as Titular Archbishop of Damascus. On 1 June 1621, he was consecrated bishop by Ulpiano Volpi, Bishop of Novara, with Attilio Amalteo, Titular Archbishop of Athenae, and Cosimo de Torres, Titular Archbishop of Hadrianopolis in Haemimonto, serving as co-consecrators. It is uncertain how long he served as Titular Archbishop of Damascus. The next bishop of record is Antonio Sotomayor who was appointed on 16 July 1632.

== Episcopal succession ==
Episcopal succession of Agostino Morosin

While bishop, he was the principal consecrator of: Principal Consecrator of:

- Antonio Bonfiglioli, Bishop of Carinola (1622);

and the principal co-consecrator of:

- Federico Baldissera Bartolomeo Cornaro, Bishop of Bergamo (1623);
- Giulio Antonio Santoro, Archbishop of Cosenza (1624); and
- Diego Cabeza de Vaca, Bishop of Crotone (1624).

Catholic Church titles
Preceded by Francesco Sacrati (cardinal)	Titular Archbishop of Damascus; 1621–1632?	Succeeded by Antonio Sotomayor
