= Adam Nowodworski =

17th-century Roman Catholic bishop

Most Reverend Adam Nowodworski
- Bishop of Poznań
- Church: Catholic Church
- Diocese: Diocese of Poznań
- In office: 1631–1634

Orders
- Consecration: 26 April 1615 by Benedetto Giustiniani

Personal details
- Born: 1573 Płock, Poland
- Died: 26 August 1634 (aged 60–61)

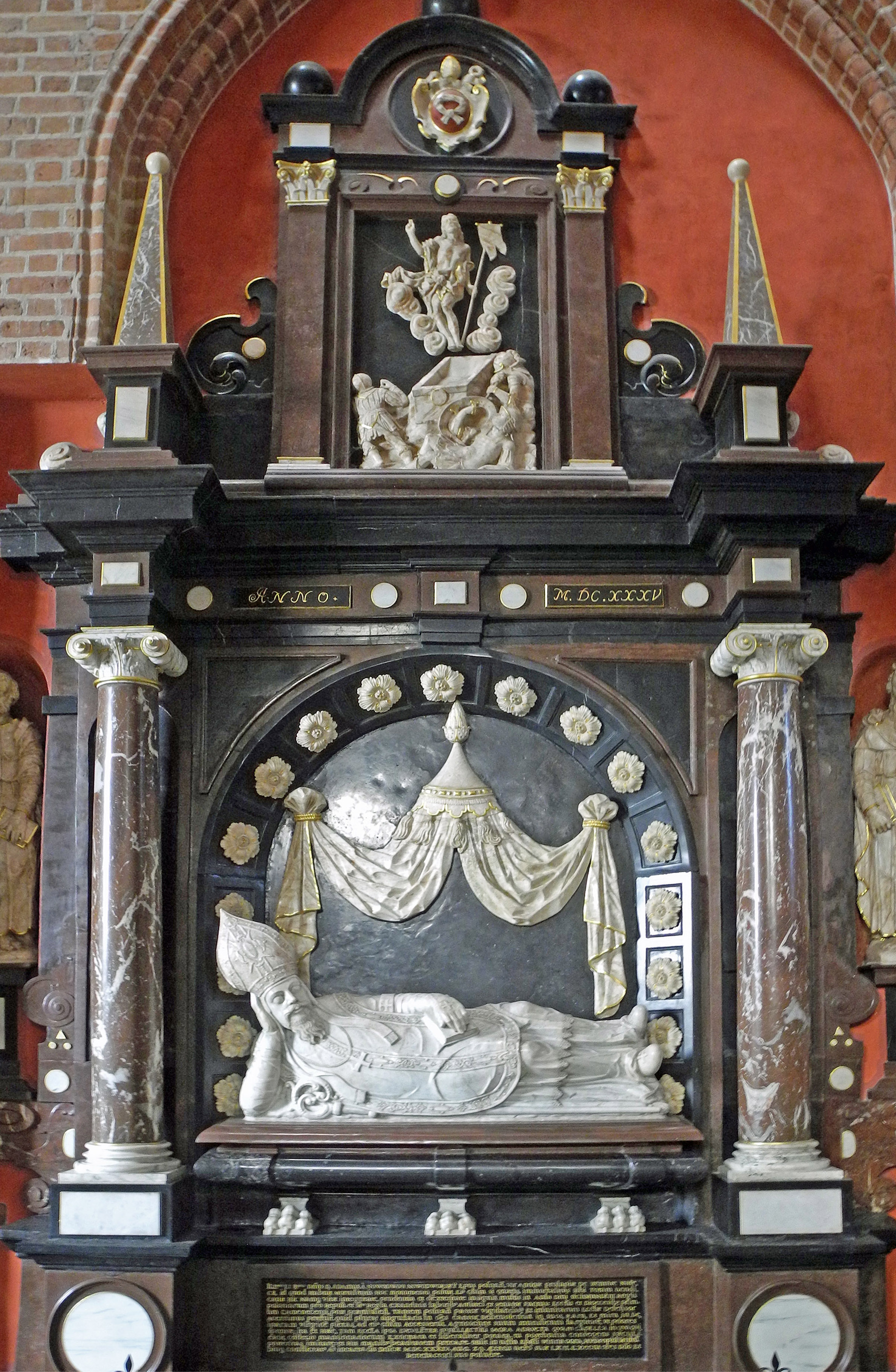
Epitaph of Adam Nowodworski in the Archcathedral Basilica of St. Peter and St. Paul in Poznań

Adam Nowodworski (1572 – 26 August 1634) was a Roman Catholic Polish bishop of Kamieniec (1614–1627), bishop of Przemyśl (1627–1631) and bishop of Poznań (1631–1634).

== Biography ==
On 26 April 1615, he was consecrated bishop by Benedetto Giustiniani, Cardinal-Bishop of Palestrina, with Attilio Amalteo, Titular Archbishop of Athenae, and Ascanio Gesualdo, Archbishop of Bari-Canosa, serving as co-consecrators.
