= Benzo of Alba =

Italian bishop

Benzo of Alba (died c. 1089) was an Italian bishop. He was an opponent of Gregorian reform who supported Henry IV of Germany in the Investiture Controversy.

Benzo's date of birth is unknown but he was probably born in northern Italy. Benzo began his career in the imperial chapel, and was probably raised to the see of Alba by Henry III, Holy Roman Emperor. During the Cadalan Schism (1061–1064), Benzo supported the imperial candidate, Bishop Cadalus of Parma, against the reform candidate, Pope Alexander II. Benzo later opposed Pope Gregory VII.

He was driven from his see by members of the Pataria around 1076 or 1077, and probably returned to the imperial court during 1081–1084. Around 1085–1086, he wrote his only extant work: Ad Heinricum IV imperatorem libri VII (Seven Books To Emperor Henry IV): this polemical text was dedicated to Henry IV of Germany.
