= Martino Alfieri =

Apostolic Nuncio to Cologne

- Archbishop of Cosenza
- Church: Catholic Church
- See: Cosenza
- Appointed: 11 April 1639
- Term ended: 30 March 1641
- Predecessor: Giulio Antonio Santoro
- Successor: Antonio Ricciulli
- Other posts: Apostolic Nuncio to Cologne, Bishop of Isola

Orders
- Consecration: 10 Sept 1634 (Bishop) by Card. Giulio Roma

Personal details
- Born: November 1590 Milan, Italy
- Died: 30 March 1641 (aged 50) Naples, Italy

Martino Alfieri or Alferi (November 1590 – 30 March 1641) was Apostolic Nuncio to Cologne from 1634 to 1639 and he served also as Bishop of Isola and Archbishop of Cosenza.

== Life ==
Martino Alfieri was born in Milan in November 1590 where he studied by the Jesuits. He completed his studies earning a doctorate in utroque iure in the University of Pavia and then he moved to Rome, where he was ordained priest on 15 April 1623. In 1627 he became vicar of the Basilica di Santa Maria Maggiore and his ecclesiastic career proceeded with the appointment as referendary of the Tribunals of the Apostolic Signature of Justice and of Grace (which made him a prelate and gave him the right to practice before the Roman courts), member of Fabric of Saint Peter and consultor of the Holy office.

After these experiences, in 1631 he was sent to Malta as Apostolic Visitor and Inquisitor.

In 1634 the Pope Urban VIII entrusted him with the office of Nuncio to the Electorate of Cologne. Because of that office on 21 August 1634 he was appointed Bishop of Isola. The episcopal consecration followed on 10 September in the Basilica di Santa Maria Maggiore by the hands of Cardinal Giulio Roma. Alfieri was also administrator to the Apostolic Nunciature to Flanders until the appointment of Richard Paul Stravius.

As Nuncio, he initially dwelt in Liège during the conflict between such town and the Prince-elector Archbishop of Cologne Ferdinand of Bavaria. In 1636 the Pope planned a peace conference to put an end to the Thirty Years' War and for this reason the Pope appointed Cardinal Marzio Ginetti as extraordinary nuncio (Legatus a latere) in Cologne. Martino Alfieri also moved to Cologne. The planned peace conference however did not succeed to be called due mainly to the caution of the France, the need of obtaining passports for the German Protestant Princes and in general the refusal of Papal mediation.

On 11 April 1639 he was replaced as Nuncio and appointed to Archbishop of Cosenza. He left Cologne in August only after the arrival of his successor Fabio Chigi and he waited in Rome for the pallium up to 8 September 1640. He moved to his diocese but he died from Phthsis in Napoli on 30 March 1641.
