= Roman Catholic Archbishopric of Damascus =

Titular see

The Archbishopric of Damascus is a Roman Catholic titular see located in Damascus, Syria.

== Ordinaries ==
- Antoine Le Tonnellier (11 Nov 1540 appointed – )
- Jacques Maistret, O. Carm. (17 Nov 1574 – 1616 died)
- Robert Berthelot, O. Carm. (26 Nov 1601 – 23 Nov 1630 died)
- Decio Carafa (17 May 1606 – 7 Jan 1613 appointed, Archbishop of Naples)
- Francesco Sacrati (cardinal) (5 Nov 1612 23 May 1622 appointed, Archbishop (personal title) of Cesena)
- Agostino Morosini (17 May 1621 appointed – )
- Antonio Sotomayor, O.P. (16 Jul 1632 – 3 Sep 1648 died)
- Bernardino Rocci (9 Apr 1668 – 15 Jul 1675 enstalled, cardinal-priest of Santo Stefano al Monte Celio)
- Orazio Mattei (17 Jun 1675 Appointed – 30 Sep 1686 installed, cardinal-priest of San Lorenzo in Panisperna)
- Sebastiano Antonio Tanara (28 Apr 1687 – 21 May 1696 installed, cardinal-priest of Santi Quattro Coronati)
- Daniello Marco Delfino (2 Jan 1696 – 15 Sep 1698 appointed, Archbishop (personal title) of Brescia)
- Antonfelice Zondadari (5 Dec 1701 – 23 Sep 1715 installed, cardinal-priest of Santa Balbina)
- Vincenzo Petra (5 Oct 1712 – 20 Dec 1724 installed, cardinal-priest of Sant’Onofrio)
- Francesco Antonio Finy (20 Dec 1724 – 8 Mar 1728 installed, cardinal-priest of Santa Maria in Via)
- Giuseppe Maria Feroni (10 May 1728 – 10 Dec 1753 installed, cardinal-priest of San Pancrazio)
- Giovanni Carlo Molinari (14 Jan 1754 – 31 Mar 1763 died)
- Filippo Maria Pirelli (4 Feb 1765 – 1 Dec 1766 installed, cardinal-priest of San Crisogono)
- Bernardino Giraud (6 Apr 1767 – 15 Mar 1773 appointed, Archbishop of Ferrara)
- Marcantonio Conti (3 Apr 1775 – 25 Jan 1780 died)
- François de Pierre de Bernis (20 Sep 1784 – 2 Nov 1794 succeeded, Archbishop of Albi)
- Emidio Ziucci (16 Dec 1796 – 20 Apr 1802 died)
- Pietro Francesco Galleffi (31 Aug 1819 – 29 May 1820 appointed, cardinal-bishop of Albano)
- Giuseppe della Porta Rodiani (19 Apr 1822 – 16 May 1823 appointed, titular Patriarch of Constantinople)
- Camillo Giovanni Rossi (9 Apr 1827 – 16 Jul 1837 died)
- Francesco Brigante Colonna (20 Jan 1845 – 27 Jul 1846 appointed, Archbishop (personal title) of Recanati e Loreto)
- Domenico Lucciardi (21 Dec 1846 – 10 Apr 1851 appointed, titular Patriarch of Constantinople)
- Luigi Clementi (8 Aug 1851 – 21 Dec 1863 Appointed, Archbishop (personal title) of Rimini)
- Pier Francesco Meglia (22 Sep 1864 – 27 Feb 1880 appointed, cardinal-priest of Santi Silvestro e Martino ai Monti)
- Prosper Auguste Dusserre (27 Feb 1880 – 25 Nov 1892 succeeded, Archbishop of Alger)
- Serafino Cretoni (16 Jan 1893 – 3 Dec 1896 appointed, cardinal-priest of Santa Maria sopra Minerva)
- John Joseph Keane (29 Jan 1897 – 24 Jul 1900 appointed, Archbishop of Dubuque)
- Denis (Alphonse) Steyaert, O.C.D. (15 Apr 1901 – 27 Jul 1910 died)
- Angelo Giacinto Scapardini, O.P. (23 Sep 1910 – 27 Aug 1921 appointed, Archbishop (personal title) of Vigevano)
- Carlo Sica (21 Nov 1921 – 2 Dec 1939 died)
- Giuseppe Beltrami (20 Feb 1940 – 29 Jun 1967 appointed, cardinal-priest of Santa Maria Liberatrice a Monte Testaccio)

== See also ==
- Catholic Church in Syria
