= San Biagio, Modena =

Church in Modena, Italy

Coordinates: 44°38′41.9″N 10°55′47.6″E

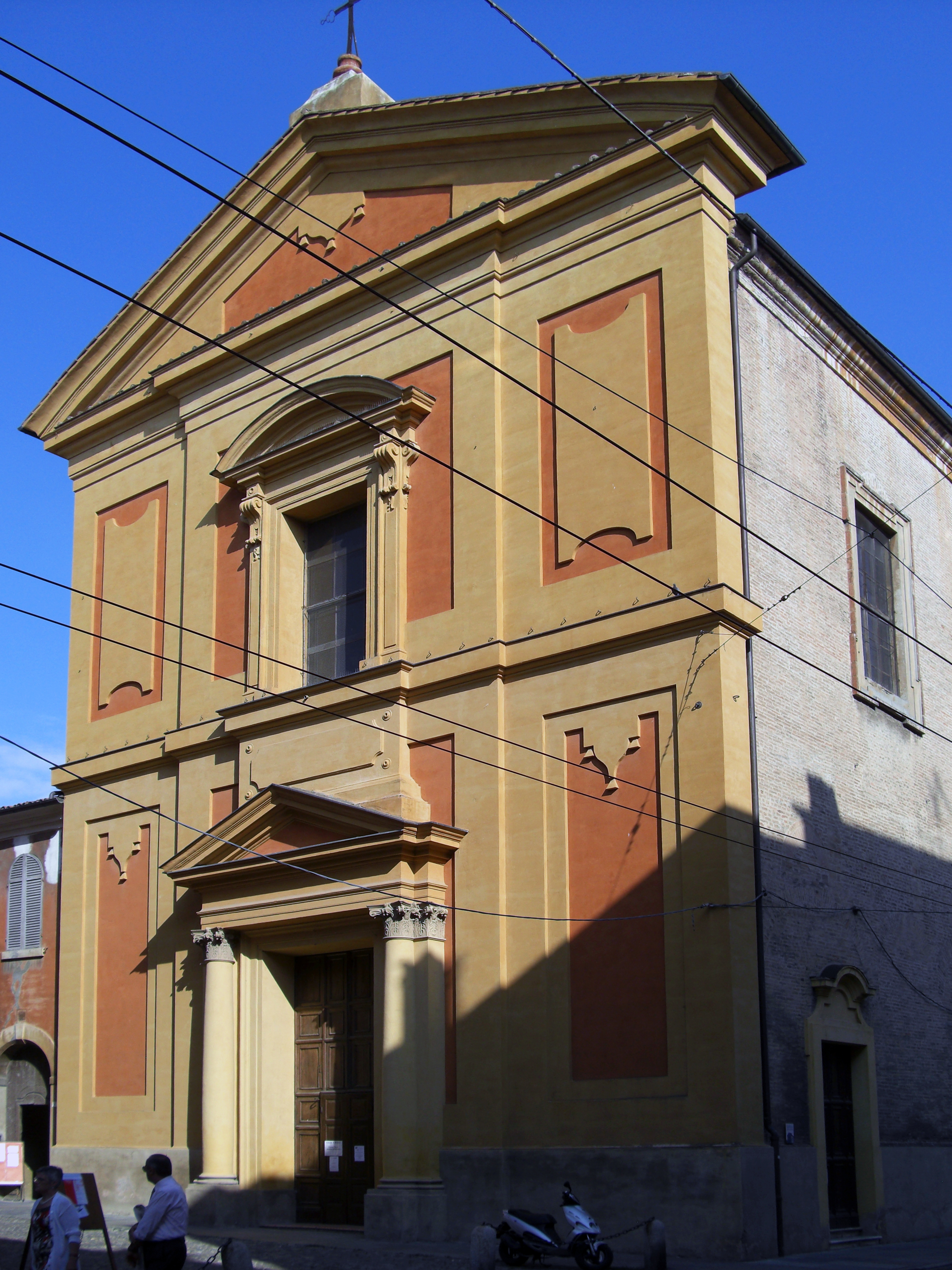
Chiesa di San Biagio, Modena.jpg

San Biagio is a Baroque architecture, Roman Catholic church, located on Via del Carmine #4 in central Modena, Italy.

== History ==
The church, initially dedicated to the Virgin of the Carmine, was built in 1319, as an annex to a Carmelite Order monastery. However, the church we see today was rebuilt in 1649–1658 under the designs of Cristoforo Malagola. When the nearby church of San Biagio, which was located at what is now the Palazzo Montecuccoli degli Erri, was demolished in 1768, the two parishes were united, and renamed San Biagio del or nel Carmine. This church is mainly known now as San Biagio.

The choir and cupola of the church were decorated by the late Baroque master Mattia Preti with a fresco of God in Glory surrounded by the Saints. In the center ceiling of the sacristy are frescoes with Elias and the flaming chariot with quadratura by Agostino Mitelli and figures by Angelo Colonna. In the 14th-century cloister is a chapel with a fresco of Madonna and Child by Tommaso da Modena.

== Interior ==
To the right of the entrance is the funereal monument of Countess Anna Maria Seghizzi (died 1821), designed and sculpted by Giuseppe Pisani. On the first arch is painting by Luigi Manzini depicting Saints Lucia, Agatha, and Apollonia. In the third arch is a painting attributed to either Dosso Dossi or Giovanni Gherardo delle Catene, depicting St Albert fighting a female demon (1530).

The pulpit and its marble reliefs were completed in the 14th and 15th-centuries. The fourth altar has 17th-century Crucifix by Gregorio Rossi.

The fifth arch has a canvas by Paolo Beroaldi depicting the patron saints of Modena: St Geminiano in center, flanked by St Omobono and St Contardo.

The organ located to the left of the altar was built by Antonio Colonna in 1625 and refurbished in 1772 by Antonio Traeri. In 1936, a modern organ was placed within the same frame. On the right tribune is a 16th-century painting attributed to Raffaele Rinaldi depicts Jesus and the Samaritan Woman.

The frescoes in the choir depict an Angelic concert, painted by Mattia Preti. A canvas depicting The Trinity and Annunciation (1596) were painted by Giovanni Battista Codebò. The canvas on the arch near the confessional depicts St John of the Cross by Francesco Vellani.

The second chapel is dedicated to the Madonna of the Carmine. The altarpiece is attributed by some to Preti, others claim it is from prior centuries. The third arch has a canvas depicting St Teresa genuflecting before St Joseph and Child Jesus, attributed to either Cignaroli or Cignani. The canvas was moved here from the suppressed church of Santa Teresa delle Carmelitane Scalze.

The fifth arch has a painting by Beroaldi depicting Saints Michael and Anthony Abbot below God the Father. The last chapel next the entrance has a baptismal font with a canvas by Domenico Carnevali depicting the Baptism of Christ. The walls had frescoes by Mitelli and Colonna.
