= Domenico Carnevale =

Italian painter and architect

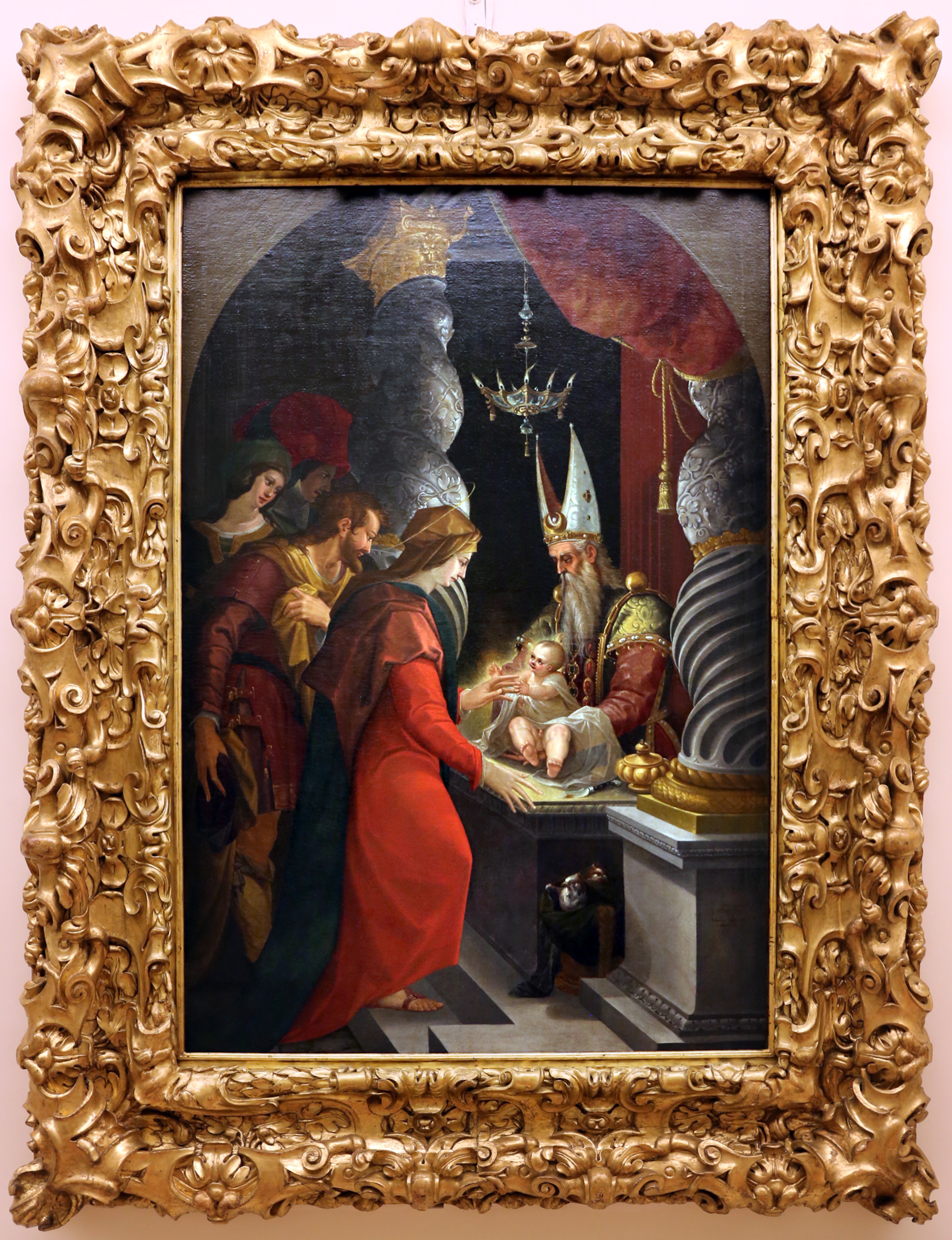
Presentation at the Temple, 1576, Galleria Estense, Modena

Domenico Carnevale (also spelt as Carnovale, Carnovali or Carnevali; 1524–18 November 1579) was an Italian painter, active in his native Modena, in Rome and in Sassuolo.

Nothing is known about his education. His earliest known work is the manneristic painting Fall of Saint Paul in the church San Pietro in Modena from 1564.

Between the years 1566 and 1572 he is documented in Rome where he worked on the restoration of Michelangelo's frescoes at the Sistine Chapel ceiling, especially the Sacrifice of Noah.

Back to Modena, he is ordered to execute a cycle of twelve paintings of the life of Saint John the Baptist for the oratory of the confraternity San Giovanni della Buona Morte for which payment documents from January 1574 to October 1577 have survived in the archive of the confraternity. A painting of the Baptism of Christ, today in San Biagio, has been identified as part of those works.

Among his surviving works is a Presentation at the Temple, probably for the destroyed church of San Erasmo in Modena, signed and dated 1576.

He excelled in painting quadratura. Older literature says that he was also an architect which cannot be confirmed.
