= Roman Catholic Diocese of Isola =

The Diocese of Isola was a Roman Catholic diocese in Italy, located in Isola di Capo Rizzuto, Crotone, Reggio Calabria in the ecclesiastical province of Santa Severina.

== History ==
- 1114: Established as Diocese of Isola (Insulensis)
- 27 Jun 1818: Suppressed (to Diocese of Crotone)
- 1968: Restored as Titular Episcopal See of Isola (Insulensis)

== Ordinaries ==
- Benedetto, O.S.A. (28 May 1451 – 23 Jul 1451 Appointed, Bishop of Dragonara)

. . .

- Bonadias de Nigronibus (4 Jun 1479 – 1487 Died)
- Angelo Castalsi (28 Feb 1488 – 1508 Died)
- Cesare Lambertini (22 Sep 1508 – 8 Jun 1545 Resigned)
- Tommaso Lambertini (8 Jun 1545 – 1550 Died)
- Onorato Fascitelli, O.S.B. (30 Jan 1551 – 1562 Resigned)
- Annibale Caracciolo (4 May 1562 – 1605 Died)
- Scipione Montalegre (1605 – 1609 Died)
- Girolamo Palazzuoli (11 Jan 1610 – 1614 Died)
- Andrea Giustiniani, O.P. (24 Nov 1614 – 27 Nov 1617 Died)
- Giovanni Antonio Massimo (12 Feb 1618 – Feb 1622 Died)
- Ascanio Castagna (8 Aug 1622 – 16 Dec 1627 Died)
- Alessandro Bichi (5 May 1628 – 9 Sep 1630 Appointed, Bishop of Carpentras)
- Francesco Bibilia (8 Jan 1631 – 1634 Died)
- Martino Alfieri (21 Aug 1634 – 11 Apr 1639 Appointed, Archbishop of Cosenza)
- Giuliano Viviani (2 May 1639 – Nov 1640 Died)
- Antonio Celli, O.P. (16 Sep 1641 – 1645 Died)
- Domenico Carnevale (19 Feb 1646 – 12 Dec 1646 Died)
- Giovanni Battista Morra (1 Jul 1647 – Oct 1648 Died)
- Giovanni Francesco Ferrari (2 May 1650 – 1659 Died)
- Carlo Rossi (bishop) (1 Sep 1659 – 9 Sep 1679 Died)
- Francesco Megale (27 Nov 1679 – 4 Nov 1681 Died)
- Francesco Martini (Marini) (25 May 1682 – Oct 1715 Died)
- Domenico Votta (20 Dec 1717 – Jun 1722 Died)
- Pierluigi del Mayo (23 Sep 1722 – 2 Apr 1749 Resigned)
- Giuseppe Lancellotti, O.F.M. Conv. (5 May 1749 – 18 Jan 1766 Died)
- Michael Angelo Monticelli (21 Jul 1766 – 15 May 1798 Died)

== See also ==
- Catholic Church in Italy
