= Diocese of Alba Pompeia =

Roman Catholic diocese in Italy

Coordinates: 44.6833°N 8.0167°E

Diocese of Alba Dioecesis Albae Pompeiensis

Catholic
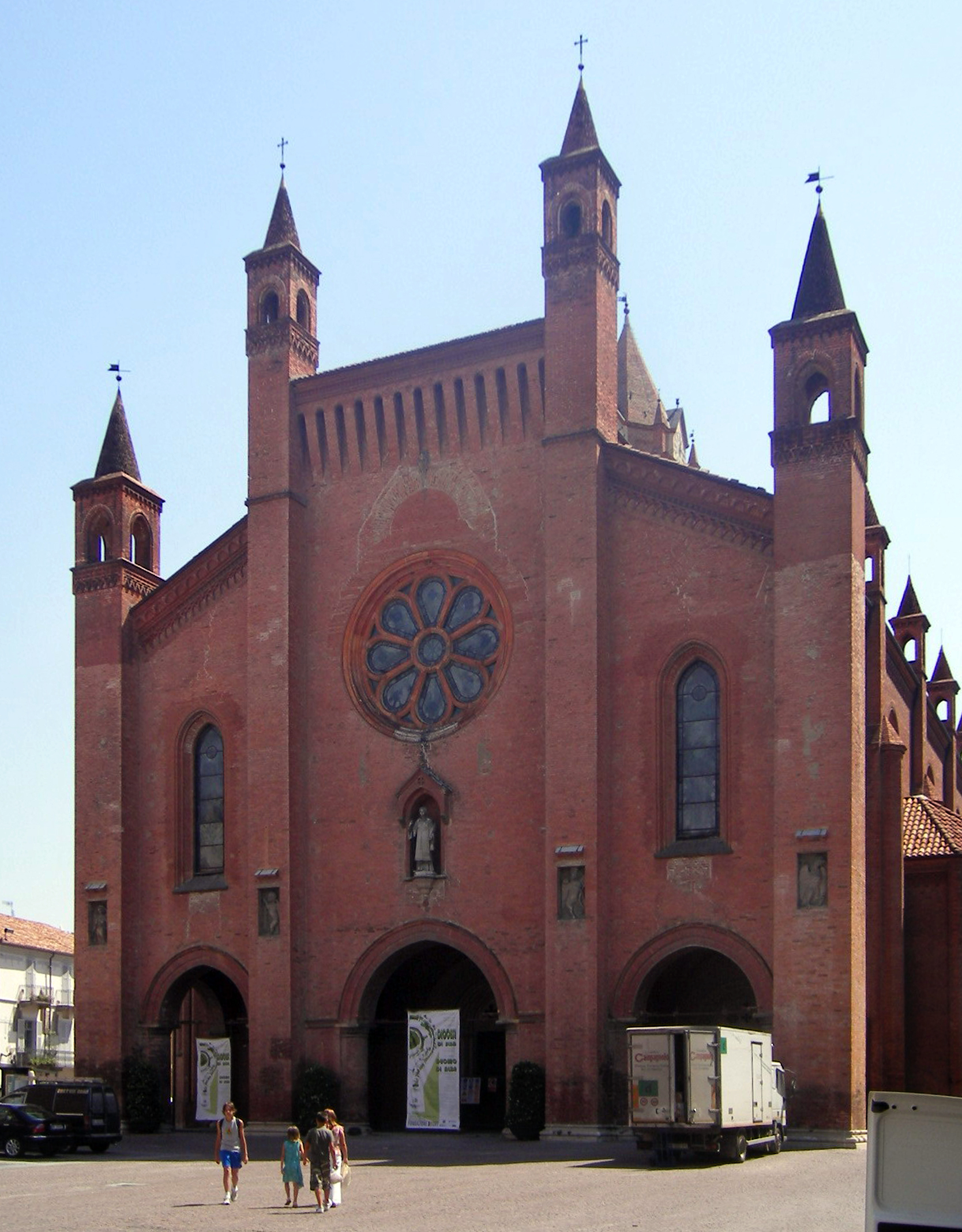
- Alba Cathedral

Location
- Country: Italy
- Ecclesiastical province: Turin

Statistics
- Area: 1,050 km^{2} (410 sq mi)
- Population: Total; Catholics: (as of 2020); 137,070 (est.); 132,475 (guess)
- Parishes: 126

Information
- Denomination: Catholic
- Sui iuris church: Latin Church
- Rite: Roman Rite
- Established: 5th century
- Cathedral: Cattedrale di S. Lorenzo
- Secular priests: 79 (diocesan); 38 (Religious Orders); 11 Permanent Deacons

Current leadership
- Pope: Leo XIV
- Bishop: Marco Brunetti

Map

Website
- www.diocesialba.it/

The Diocese of Alba Pompeia or Alba Pompea (Latin: Dioecesis Albae Pompeiensis) is a Latin Church ecclesiastical territory or diocese of the Catholic Church in Italy. Its territory comprises eighty towns in the civil Province of Cuneo and two in the Province of Asti.

The Diocese of Alba Pompeia is a suffragan diocese in the ecclesiastical province of the metropolitan Archdiocese of Turin.

== History ==
The earliest figure in the traditional list of the bishops of Alba is a St. Dionysius, of whom the story is told that after serving in Alba for some years he became Archbishop of Milan. He was the Dionysius who so energetically opposed Arianism and was exiled in the year 355 by the Emperor Constans. Daniel Papebroch disputes the reliability of this tradition, since a bishop of that period was forbidden to leave his diocese for another.

A list of nine early bishops of Alba, from another St. Dionysius (380) down to a Bishop Julius (553), was compiled from sepulchral inscriptions found in the cathedral of Alba towards the end of the fifteenth century by Dalmazzo Berendenco, an antiquarian. Giovanni Battista De Rossi, however, on examination of the inscriptions proved them to be a forgery.

The first bishop of Alba whose existence is certain is Lampradius who was present at the synod held in Rome in 499 under Pope Symmachus.

On 26 May 969, Pope John XIII notified Archbishop Wilpertus of Milan that he had suppressed the diocese of Alba Pompeia, due to the devastation of the Saracens and the death of its bishop, and united it with the diocese of Asti. The decision was confirmed by Pope Benedict VII on 19 October 982. It was restored by 997, when Bishop Constantinus is found in office.

Benzo of Alba was an adversary of Pope Gregory VII and a partisan of thue Empire in the Investiture controversy.

The Emperor Frederick Barbarossa spent Christmas of 1159 in Alba.

The diocese of Saluzzo was established by Pope Julius II on 29 October 1511, in his bull Pro excellenti, on territory taken in part from the diocese of Alba Pompeia.

The prominence of natives of Mantua among the bishops of Alba in the 16th and 17th centuries is accounted for by the grant of the Marquisate of Montferrat to the Dukes of Mantua by the Emperor Charles V in 1536. With the marquisate came the patronage previously enjoyed by the Dukes of Savoy. This arrangement persisted until 1708, when the House of Savoy acquired Montferrat and the patronage over the bishopric of Alba.

Bishop Lodovico Gonzaga held a diocesan synod in 1636.

A diocesan synod, the first in more than thirty years, was held by Bishop Eugenio Roberto Galletti in September 1873.

=== Cathedral and Chapter ===
The office of Penitentiary in the Cathedral Chapter was created by Bishop Paolo Brizio de Braida on 15 January 1644.

In 1856 the Chapter was composed of five dignities and fourteen Canons. The dignities were: the Archdeacon, the Archpriest, the Provost, the Cantor, and the Dean. The cathedral was considered a parish church, and was supervised by the Archpriest; there were two residentiary chaplains.

=== French conquest ===
When the French revolution guillotined King Louis XVI, King Victor Amadeus III of Sardinia declared war on the French Republic, but in three successive engagements, the Battle of Montenotte (12 April 1796), the Battle of Millesimo (13–14 April 1796) and the Battle of Mondovi (21 April 1796), General Napoleon Bonaparte defeated the Piedmontese. In suing for peace, Victor Amadeus was forced to cede Savoy and Nice to France. The territory became part of the Department of Mont-Blanc. King Victor Amadeus died on 18 October 1796, and his son and successor, Carlo Emanuele was forced to abdicate on 6 December 1798. Bonaparte crossed the Alps again in the Spring of 1800, intent on driving the Austrians out of the Po Valley. The victory at the Battle of Marengo gave the French control of most of Lombardy.

The French government, in the guise of ending the practices of feudalism, confiscated the incomes and benefices of the bishops and priests, and made them employees of the state, with a fixed income and the obligation to swear an oath of loyalty to the French constitution. As in metropolitan France, the government program also included reducing the number of bishoprics, making them conform as far as possible with the civil administration's "departments". Following the Concordat of 1801 between Bonaparte and Pope Pius VII, the Pope issued a bull, Gravissimis causis (1 June 1803), in which the number of diocese in Piedmont was reduced to eight: Turin, Vercelli, Ivrea, Acqui, Asti, Mondovi, Alessandria and Saluzzo. Alba was suppressed, and its territory was handed over to the diocese of Asti. Bishop Vitale of Alba was required to resign.

The Kingdom of Sardinia and the Papal States (which had been abolished by the Emperor Napoleon Bonaparte) were restored by the Congress of Vienna. The confused situation of the dioceses in Piedmont was addressed by Pope Pius VII in his bull, Beati Petri (17 July 1817) as far as the redrawing of diocesan boundaries was concerned. The diocese of Alba was restored, and it temporarily took control of the territory of the suppressed diocese of Mondovi, until it too was restored on 29 October 1817.

== Bishops ==
=== Diocese of Alba Pompeia ===
==== to 1100 ====
[Dionisius (350–355)]
Adelgisus (355)
Severus (391, 397)
Bruningus (419)
Aldericus (443)

- Lampadius (c. 499)

Manfredo (482, 483)
[Venanzio (503)]
Oldarico (532)
Pietro I (563)
Venanzio II (593)
Guglielmo (627)
Vitelmo I (661)

- Benedictus (c. 680)
- Lampadio II (801)
- Sigifredo (829)

Pietro (c. 855)

- Hildradus (c. 876)
- Liutardus (c. 901)

Vitelmo II (901)

- [Daiberto (c. 938, 945)]
- Fulcardus (969–985)
- Constantinus (c. 997, c. 1006)
- Obertus (1027)
- Benzo (attested 1059–1090)
- Albertus (1061, 1074)

Peregrinus (attested 1098)

==== from 1100 to 1400 ====
- Pietro de Valpergia (1124–1125)
- Robaldus (1125–1139)
- Pietro (V.) (1150–1158)
- Rozone (c. 1163)
- Otto (c. 1169 – c. 1177)
- ? Federico (1180)
- Bonifacius (1185, 1188)
- Gerardus (c. 1191 or 1194)
- Ogerius (c. 1192, c. 1204)
- Bonifacio (II) del Carretto (c. 1210, c. 1214)
- Reinerio (c. 1216 – c. 1226)
- Gandulfus Cauda (1227)
- Sardo (1231)
- Guglielmo Braida (1237–1253)
- Monaco (1255–1260)

[Gandolfo (1259–1262)]

- Simone (1261–1271)
- Martino, O.F.M. (c. 1276)
- Bonifacius (III) de S. Julia (c. 1283 − 1306)
- Raimundus de Mausaco, O.Min. (1311–1321)
- Guglielmo Isnardi, O.F.M. (1321–1333)
- Pietro Artaudi, O.P. (1334–1349)
- Lazzarino Fliscus (Fieschi) (1349–1367)
- Ludovico del Carretto (27 Apr 1369 – 1388)
- Federico del Carretto (1389–1390)
- Pietro del Carretto, O.P. (c. 1392)
- ? Bonifacio (IV) (1398)

==== from 1400 to 1600 ====
- Francesco (I) del Carretto (1401–1406) (Roman Obedience)
- Aleramo del Carretto (c. 1407 – c. 1409)
- Jacobus (1409)
- ? Francesco (II) del Carretto (towards 1413)
- ? Giacomo del Carretto (1412–1418)
- Alerinus de Rembaldis (1419–1456)
- Bernardo del Carretto (18 October 1456 – 1460)
- Pietro del Carretto (1460–1482)
- Andrea Novelli (6 Feb 1483 – 13 May 1521 Died)
- Ippolito Novelli (13 May 1521 Succeeded – 11 Nov 1530 Died)
- Antonio Mollo (de Nerlis) (28 Nov 1530 – 1531 Died)
- Giuliano Visconti (16 August 1532 – 27 August 1532) (bishop elect)
- Marco Girolamo Vida, C.R.L. (6 February 1533 – 27 February 1566)
- Leonardo Marini, O.P. (1566 − 1572 Resigned)
- Vincenzo Marino (19 November 1572 – 25 February 1583 Died)
- Lelio Zimbramonti (Aurelio Gibramontis) (28 March 1583 – 14 November 1583)
- Lodovico Michelio (19 Dec 1583 – 27 Apr 1590 Died)
- Alberto Capriano (30 Jul 1590 – 23 Jan 1595 Died)

==== from 1600 to 1800 ====
- Giovanni Anselmo Carminato (26 Aug 1596 – 6 July 1605)
- Francesco Pendasio (18 Jul 1605 – Sep 1616 Died)
- Vincenzo Agnello Suardi (5 Dec 1616 – 13 May 1619)
- Ludovico Gonzaga (bishop) (12 Aug 1619 – 1633)
- Giovanni Francesco Gandolfo (10 Jan 1633 – 4 Nov 1638 Died)
- Paolo Brizio, O.F.M. Obs. (15 Dec 1642 – 2 Nov 1665 Died)
- Cesare Biandrati (5 May 1666 – June 1666)
- Vittorio Nicolino della Chiesa (16 March 1667 – 22 Sep 1691)
- Gerolamo Ubertino Provana, C.R. (25 June 1692 – 16 Aug 1696 Died)
- Giuseppe Rottario (Rovero) (27 March 1697 – 4 Nov 1720)

Sede vacante (1720–1726)

- Carlo Francesco Vasco, O.C.D. (30 July 1727 – 31 Dec 1749)
- Enrichetto Virginio (Raffale Francesco) Natta, O.P. (22 July 1750 – 29 June 1768)
- Giacinto Amedeo Vagnone (11 Sep 1769 Confirmed – 30 Jan 1777 Resigned)
- Giuseppe Maria Langosco-Stroppiana (20 Jul 1778 Confirmed – 13 Dec 1788 Died)
- Giovanni Battista Pio Vitale (11 Apr 1791 Confirmed – 29 May 1803 Resigned)

==== since 1800 ====
- Giovanni-Antonio Niccola (Nicola) (16 Mar 1818 – 12 Jan 1834 Died)
- Costanzo-Michele Fea (1 Feb 1836 – 2 Nov 1853)
- Eugenio Roberto Galletti (27 Mar 1867 – 5 Oct 1879)
- Carlo Lorenzo Pampirio, O.P. (27 Feb 1880 – 24 May 1889)
- Giuseppe Francesco Re (30 Dec 1889 – 17 Jan 1933 Died)
- Luigi Maria Grassi, B. (13 Mar 1933 – 5 Apr 1948 Died)
- Carlo Stoppa (27 Dec 1948 – 13 Feb 1965 Died)
- Luigi Bongianino (15 Jan 1970 – 6 Jun 1975 Appointed, Bishop of Tortona)
- Angelo Fausto Vallainc (7 Oct 1975 – 8 Dec 1986 Died)
- Giulio Nicolini (16 Jul 1987 – 16 Feb 1993 Appointed, Bishop of Cremona)
- Sebastiano Dho (3 Jul 1993 – 28 Jun 2010 Retired)
- Giacomo Lanzetti (28 Jun 2010 – 24 Sep 2015 Resigned)
- Marco Brunetti (21 Jan 2016 – )

== Parishes ==
The number of Catholics recorded for the diocese in 1920 was 150,500 and there were 101 parishes, 316 secular and 11 regular clergy, 43 seminarians, 675 churches or chapels, 6 brothers, and 180 sisters. In 1962 the diocese had 137 parishes, 242 secular priests, 62 religious priests, and 41 seminarians.

The diocese currently (2015) has 126 parishes, all within the (civil) region of Piedmont. Three are in the Province of Asti and 123 in the Province of Cuneo.

== Bibliography ==
=== References ===
- Gams, Pius Bonifatius (1873). Series episcoporum Ecclesiae catholicae: quotquot innotuerunt a beato Petro apostolo. Ratisbon: Typis et Sumptibus Georgii Josephi Manz. pp. 809–810. (in Latin)
- Eubel, Conradus; Gulik, Guilelmus, eds. (1923). Hierarchia catholica, Tomus 3 (second ed.). Münster: Libreria Regensbergiana.
- Gauchat, Patritius (Patrice) (1935). Hierarchia catholica IV (1592-1667). Münster: Libraria Regensbergiana.
- Ritzler, Remigius; Sefrin, Pirminus (1952). Hierarchia catholica medii et recentis aevi V (1667-1730). Patavii: Messagero di S. Antonio.
- Ritzler, Remigius; Sefrin, Pirminus (1958). Hierarchia catholica medii et recentis aevi VI (1730-1799). Patavii: Messagero di S. Antonio.
- Ritzler, Remigius; Sefrin, Pirminus (1968). Hierarchia Catholica medii et recentioris aevi sive summorum pontificum, S. R. E. cardinalium, ecclesiarum antistitum series... A pontificatu Pii PP. VII (1800) usque ad pontificatum Gregorii PP. XVI (1846) (in Latin). Vol. VII. Monasterii: Libr. Regensburgiana.
- Remigius Ritzler; Pirminus Sefrin (1978). Hierarchia catholica Medii et recentioris aevi... A Pontificatu PII PP. IX (1846) usque ad Pontificatum Leonis PP. XIII (1903) (in Latin). Vol. VIII. Il Messaggero di S. Antonio.
- Pięta, Zenon (2002). Hierarchia catholica medii et recentioris aevi... A pontificatu Pii PP. X (1903) usque ad pontificatum Benedictii PP. XV (1922) (in Latin). Vol. IX. Padua: Messagero di San Antonio. ISBN 978-88-250-1000-8.

=== Studies ===
- Bima, Palemone Luigi (1842). Serie cronologica dei Romani Pontefici e degli Arcivescovi e Vescovi di tutti gli stati di Sardegna. 2. ed (in Italian) (seconda ed.). Torino: Fratelli Favale. pp. 49–55. [a variorum list, inaccurate and credulous]
- Cappelletti, Giuseppe (1858). Le chiese d'Italia: dalla loro origine sino ai nostri giorni (in Italian). Vol. decimoquarto (XIV). Venice: G. Antonelli. pp. 159–175.
- Della Chiesa, Francesco Agostino (1645). S. R. E. Cardinalium, Archiepiscoporum, Episcoporum et Abbatum Pedemontanae Regionis ... historia (in Latin). Turin: Giovanni Domenico Tarini. pp. 177–184.
- Kehr, Paul Fridolin (1914). Italia pontificia : sive, Repertorium privilegiorum et litterarum a romanis pontificibus ante annum 1598 Italiae ecclesiis, monasteriis, civitatibus singulisque personis concessorum. Vol. VI. pars ii. Berolini: Weidmann. pp. 185–189.
- Lanzoni, Francesco (1927). Le diocesi d'Italia, dalle origini al principio del secolo VII (anno 604). Faenza: F. Lega.
- Maggi, G. (1983). "Temi politici e sociali nell'azione dei cattolici albesi del primo Novecento," in: Alba Pompei, nuova serie 4 (1983), pp. 5–18. (in Italian)
- Savio, Fedele (1898). Gli antichi vescovi d'Italia dalle origini al 1300 descritti per regioni: Il Piemonte (in Italian). Torino: Fratelli Bocca. pp. 49–65.
- Schwartz, Gerhard (1913). Die Besetzung der Bistümer Reichsitaliens unter den sächsischen und salischen Kaisern: mit den Listen der Bischöfe, 951-1122, Leipzig-Berlin 1913. (in German)
- Stefani, Guglielmo, ed. (1854). Dizionario corografico degli Stati Sardi di Terraferma (in Italian). Milano: Civelli. pp. 19–24.
- Ughelli, Ferdinando; Coleti, Niccolo (1719). Italia sacra, sive de episcopis Italiae et insularum adjacentium (in Latin). Vol. Tomus quartus (4) (2nd ed.). Venice: Apud Sebastianum Coleti. pp. 281–301.
