= Isola di Capo Rizzuto =

Isola di Capo Rizzuto Ìsula Capu Rizzutu
- Comune
- Comune di Isola di Capo Rizzuto
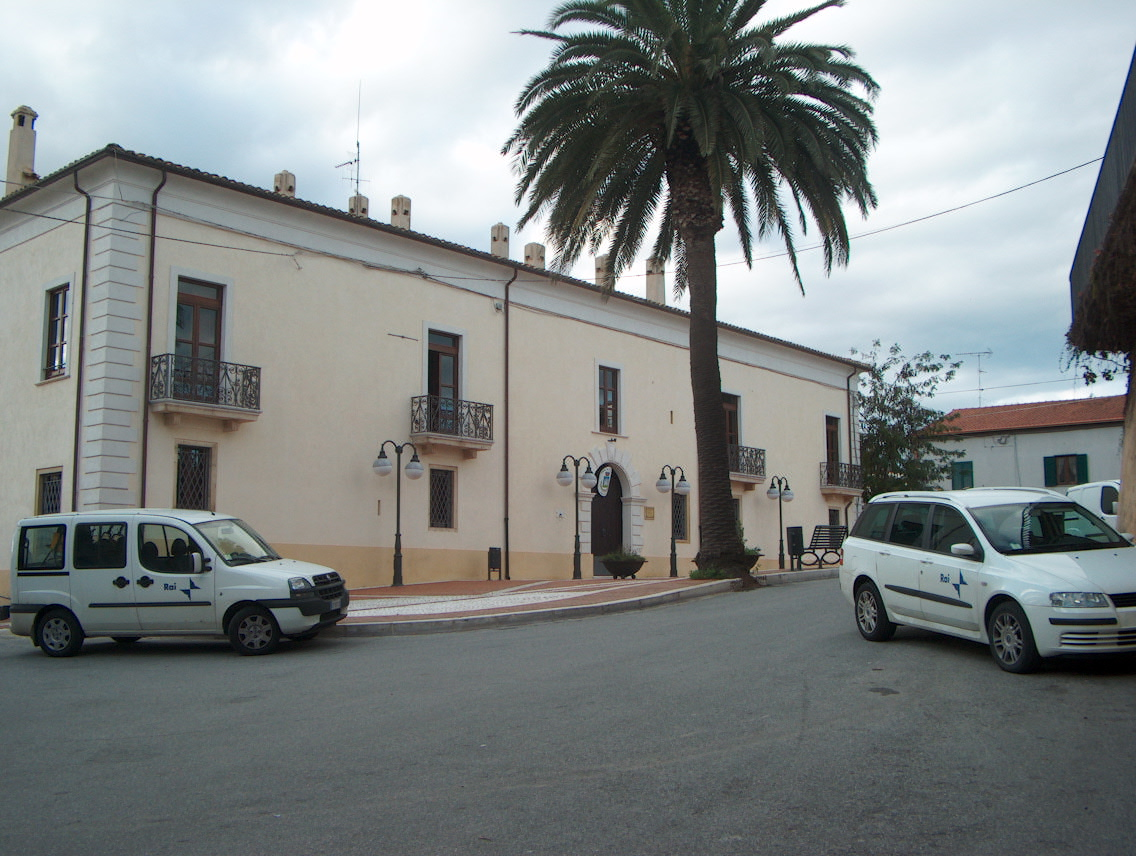
- Palazzo Barracco, the town hall

- Coat of arms

- Location within Italy Location within Calabria
- Coordinates: 38°57′32″N 17°05′44″E
- Country: Italy
- Region: Calabria
- Province: Crotone (KR)
- Frazioni: Campolongo, Capo Rizzuto, Le Castella, Sant'Anna, Le Cannella, Marinella

Government
  - Mayor: (commissar)

Area
  - Total: 125 km^{2} (48 sq mi)
- Elevation: 90 m (300 ft)

Population (February 28, 2007)
  - Total: 14,839
  - Density: 119/km^{2} (307/sq mi)
- Demonym: Isolitani
- Time zone: UTC+1 (CET)
  - Summer (DST): UTC+2 (CEST)
- Postal code: 88841
- Dialing code: 0962
- Patron saint: Madonna Greca
- Website: Official website

Isola di Capo Rizzuto (Italian: [ˈiːzola di ˈkaːpo ritˈtsuːto]; Isolitano: Ìsula Capu Rizzutu) is a comune (municipality) in the province of Crotone, Calabria, Italy. The population of the town is around 15,000.

== Overview ==
Despite the name Isola (island), the town is entirely on the mainland. There are several theories about the name, which may derive from Greek mythology or may be a corruption of a Greek word. Geographically the seaside district of the town of Capo Rizzuto is a peninsula. Elsewhere the main historical attraction, the powerful 16th-century fortification in the district of Le Castella, stands on a piece of land connected to the mainland by a narrow causeway.

In 1977 the archaeologist Domenico Marino discovered and excavated a site on the Capo Piccolo promontory with important Early Bronze Age II and Middle Bronze Age I-II artifacts of Minoan origin, demonstrating early trade contact between the eastern Mediterranean and Italy. The finds are on display in the National Archaeological Museum in nearby Crotone.

The town forms part of the Marine Protected Area Capo Rizzuto.

The Sant'Anna Cara immigrant centre holds 1,500 people at a time.

== See also ==
- Calabrian wine
- Roman Catholic Diocese of Isola
- Capo Rizzuto Lighthouse
