= Terence Farrell =

Irish sculptor (1798–1876)

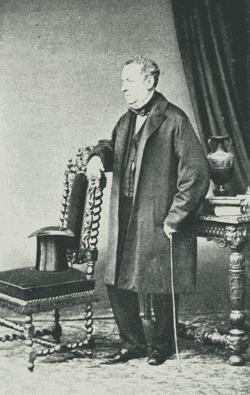
- Born: 1798; Creve, County Longford, Ireland
- Died: 19 March 1876 (aged 77–78); 11 Warrington Place, Dublin
- Children: James Farrell, Joseph Farrell (brother), Thomas Farrell, John Farrell

Terence Farrell (1798 – 19 March 1876) was an Irish sculptor, now best known for his portrait busts and works at Wrest Park for Earl de Grey.

== Life and family ==
Farrell was born in Creve, County Longford in 1798, where his family ran stone quarries. In 1810 Farrell and his mother moved to Dublin, and he enrolled in the Modelling School of the Dublin Society, where he studied under Edward Smyth and later John Smyth.

In 1819, he married Maria Ruxton, with whom he had six sons, all of whom became sculptors. James and Joseph trained with Farrell. His son John, trained at the modelling school of the Royal Dublin Society. His son, Thomas, was the most successful of the Farrell brothers. The younger sons were Michael (1834-55) and William (born 1839). He also had at least one daughter, Maria. Her married named was Jones. His wife died in 1839.

Farrell died on 19 March 1876 at 11 Warrington Place, Dublin, having been largely overtaken in fame by Thomas. He is buried in St Andrew's Church, Westland Row, Dublin. None of his sons married, so the family business ended with their deaths.

== Career ==
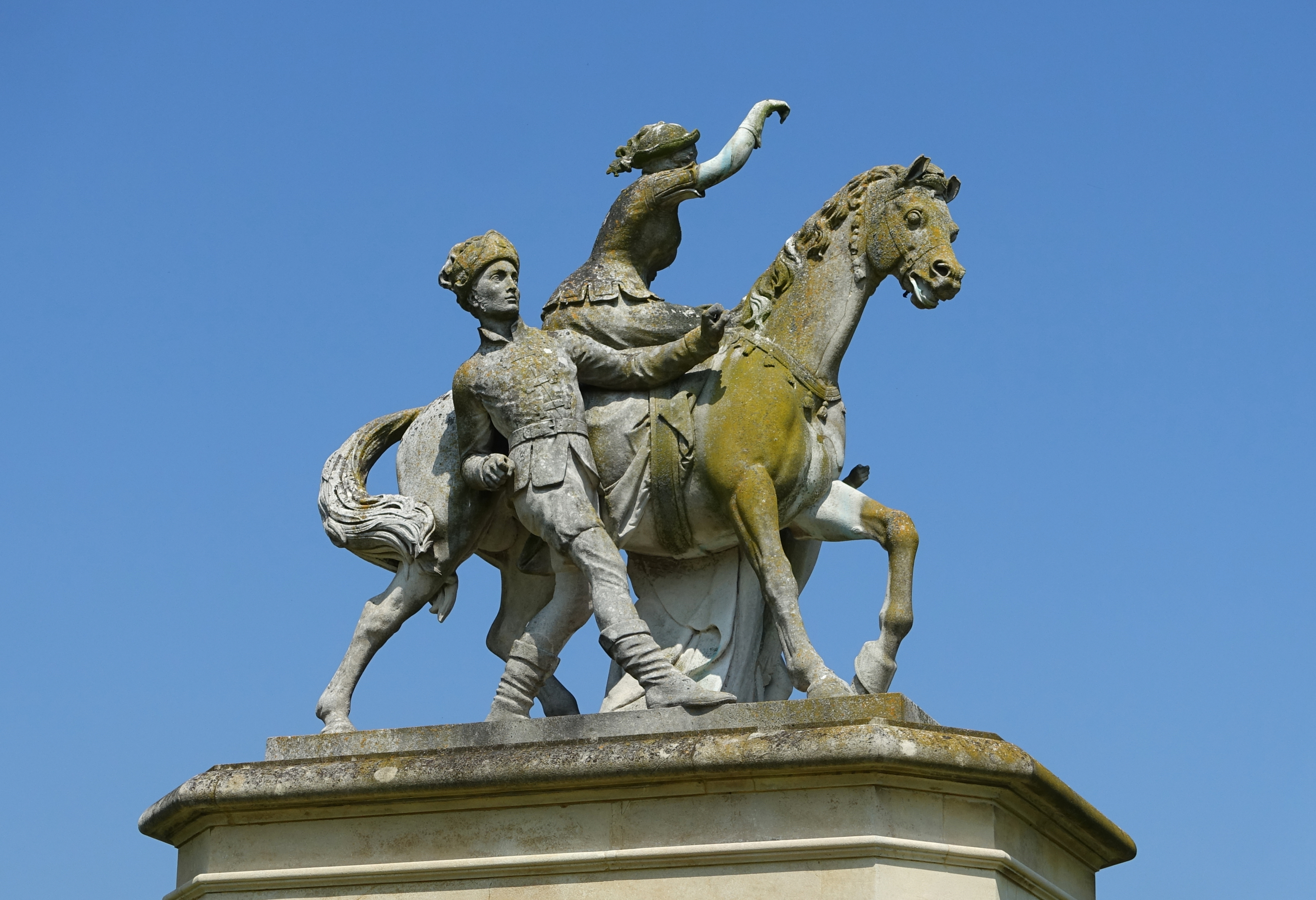
The Hawking Party Statue, Wrest Park by Farrell

After school in 1821, he entered Thomas Kirk's studio, where he continued his studies for nearly seven years as a pupil, and subsequently as an assistant.

In 1826 he made his first contribution to the Royal Hibernian Academy (RHA), and about 1828 he established his own workshop, in Golden Lane at first and later to Peter Street, establishing himself as a miniature portrait bust sculptor. He applied to the mastership of the modelling school of the Dublin Society after the death of John Smyth, but lost out to Constantine Panormo (c.1805-1852). He opened a sculpture yard on Lower Mecklenburgh Street in 1841 and expanded into monumental works, from where six of his sons also became sculptors. The yard subsequently moved to North Gloucester Street Lower.

He exhibited regularly in the RHA, where he was elected an Associate in July 1851, and a Member in May 1859. He was also involved with the Society of Irish Artists, and exhibited at the Irish Industrial Exhibition of 1853 in Dublin.

== Selected works ==
- Sir Lowry Cole. Statue in Portland stone, Enniskillen.
- William, 3rd Earl of Enniskillen. Statue, Enniskillen Church.
- Lt.-Col. Tomlinson. Monument erected by the officers of the 18th Royal Irish Regiment, St. Patrick's Cathedral, 1853.
- Sir Hussey Vivian, Commander of the Forces. Monument, Truro Church, Cornwall.
- Early Affliction. Marble Statue. R.H.A., 1848.
- The Seasons, Wrest Park.
