= Mountjoy Square =

Georgian garden square in Dublin, Ireland,

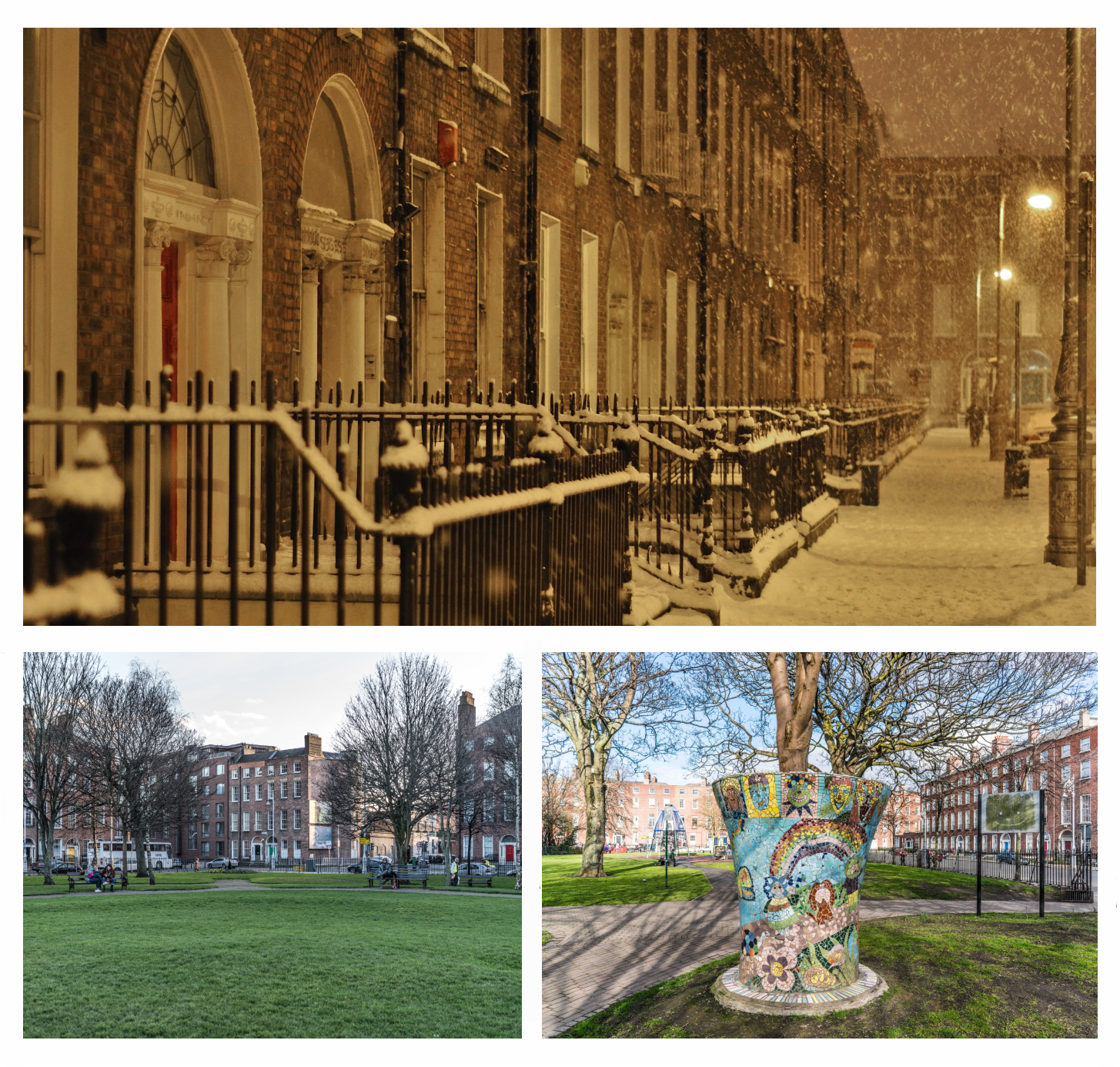
- Clockwise from top: Mountjoy Square South in the snow of January 2010; a tree decorated with a mosaic in Mountjoy Square Park; Mountjoy Square West

- Location within Central Dublin
- Native name: Cearnóg Mhuinseo (Irish)
- Former name: Gardiner Square
- Namesake: Luke Gardiner, 1st Viscount Mountjoy
- Area: 2 hectares (4.9 acres)
- Location: Dublin, Ireland
- Postal code: D01
- Coordinates: 53°21′23.8″N 6°15′27.0″W

Other
- Known for: Georgian architecture

Mountjoy Square (Irish: Cearnóg Mhuinseo) is a garden square in Dublin, Ireland, on the Northside of the city just under a kilometre from the River Liffey. One of five Georgian squares in Dublin, it was planned and developed in the late 18th century by Luke Gardiner, 1st Viscount Mountjoy. It is surrounded on all sides by terraced, red-brick Georgian houses. Construction of the houses began piecemeal in 1792 and the final property was completed in 1818.

Over the centuries, the square has been home to many of Dublin's most prominent people: lawyers, churchmen, politicians, writers and visual artists. The writer James Joyce lived around the square during some of his formative years, playwright Seán O'Casey wrote and set some of his most famous plays on the square while living there, W. B. Yeats stayed there with his friend John O'Leary, and more recently, much of the Oscar-winning film Once was made in the square. Historic meetings have taken place there, including planning for the Easter Rising and some of the earliest Dáil meetings. Prominent Irish Unionists and Republicans have shared the square.

Mountjoy can boast of being Dublin's only true Georgian square, each of its sides being exactly 140 metres in length. While the North, East and West sides each have 18 houses, the South has 19, reflecting some variation in plot sizes. Though each side was originally numbered individually, the houses are now numbered continuously clockwise from no. 1 in the north-west corner. While its North and South sides are continuous from corner to corner, the East and West sides are in three terraces, interrupted by two side streets, Grenville Street and Gardiner Place to the West and Fitzgibbon and North Great Charles Street to the East. Gardiner Street passes through the West side of the square, while Belvidere Place and Gardiner Lane run off the North- and South-East corners.

Although some of the original buildings fell to ruin over the 20th century and were eventually demolished, the new infill buildings were fronted with reproduction façades, so each side of the square maintains its appearance as a consistent Georgian terrace.

== Development of the square ==
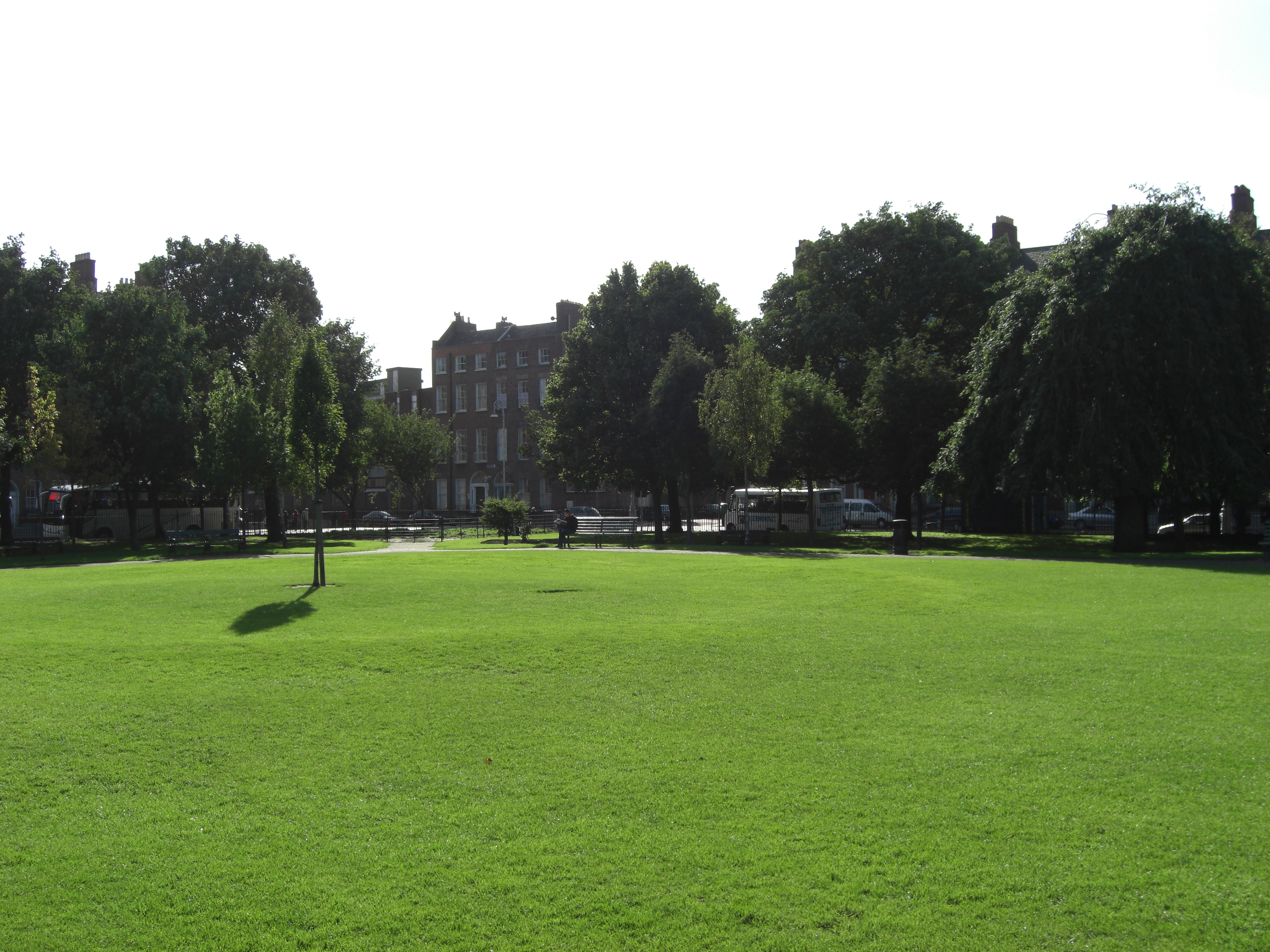
Mountjoy Square Park, facing towards a house connected to W. B. Yeats, on the south-west corner

The first Luke Gardiner (died 1755) was a highly successful banker, developer and Member of Parliament for Dublin in the early 18th century. During his career, he acquired a wide variety of properties throughout the city. The major continuous part, much of which he purchased from the Moore family in 1714, was a large piece of land to the East of the then-established city. This estate corresponds to the modern area bounded by The Royal Canal, Dorset Street, the Western Way, Constitution Hill, Parnell Street, O'Connell Street and the River Liffey. As owner of this land, Gardiner led the development of the Northside of the city east along the river, developing what is now O'Connell Street (then Sackville Street), Dorset Street, Parnell Street and Square (then Rutland Street & Square). After his death, his son and heir Charles continued the development, finishing Rutland Square before his grandson, the second Luke Gardiner (later Lord and Viscount Mountjoy) inherited the estate and accelerated the development further East. A powerful figure, Luke II was a member of the Wide Streets Commission and MP for County Dublin.

Mountjoy Square was developed as part of this third development phase. An early plan and elevation, known then as Gardiner Square was drawn up in 1787 by Thomas Sherrard, surveyor to the Wide Streets Commissioners. Gardiner and Sherrard had an ambitious vision for the square. It was on high ground, so all streets off it led downhill. It overlooked the Custom House and was connected to it by Gardiner Street. The plan included a rebuilt St. George's Church in the centre of the park. The original West side plans show a palatial stone-clad street frontage with a terrace of brick residential houses behind the cladding. A less ambitious compromise of red-brick façades, consistent with other nearby streets, eventually prevailed.

The square was laid out and construction began first on the south side, about 1790, continuing until 1818. The stuccatore Michael Stapleton was one of the first to acquire leases (dated October 1789), corresponding to Nos. 43, 44 and 45 Mountjoy Square (all demolished in the 1980s, despite the presence of Stapleton's decoration). His houses were complete by 1793. Luke Gardiner II was killed at the Battle of New Ross during the Rebellion of 1798 with the third side still under construction.

After completion, contemporaries Warburton, Whitelaw and Walsh said of it:

This square, which is now completely finished, is neat, simple and elegant, its situation elevated and healthy … the elevation of the houses, the breadth of the streets, so harmonize together, as to give pleasure to the eye of the spectator, and to add to the neatness, simplicity, and regularity everywhere visible, entitling this square to rank high among the finest in Europe.

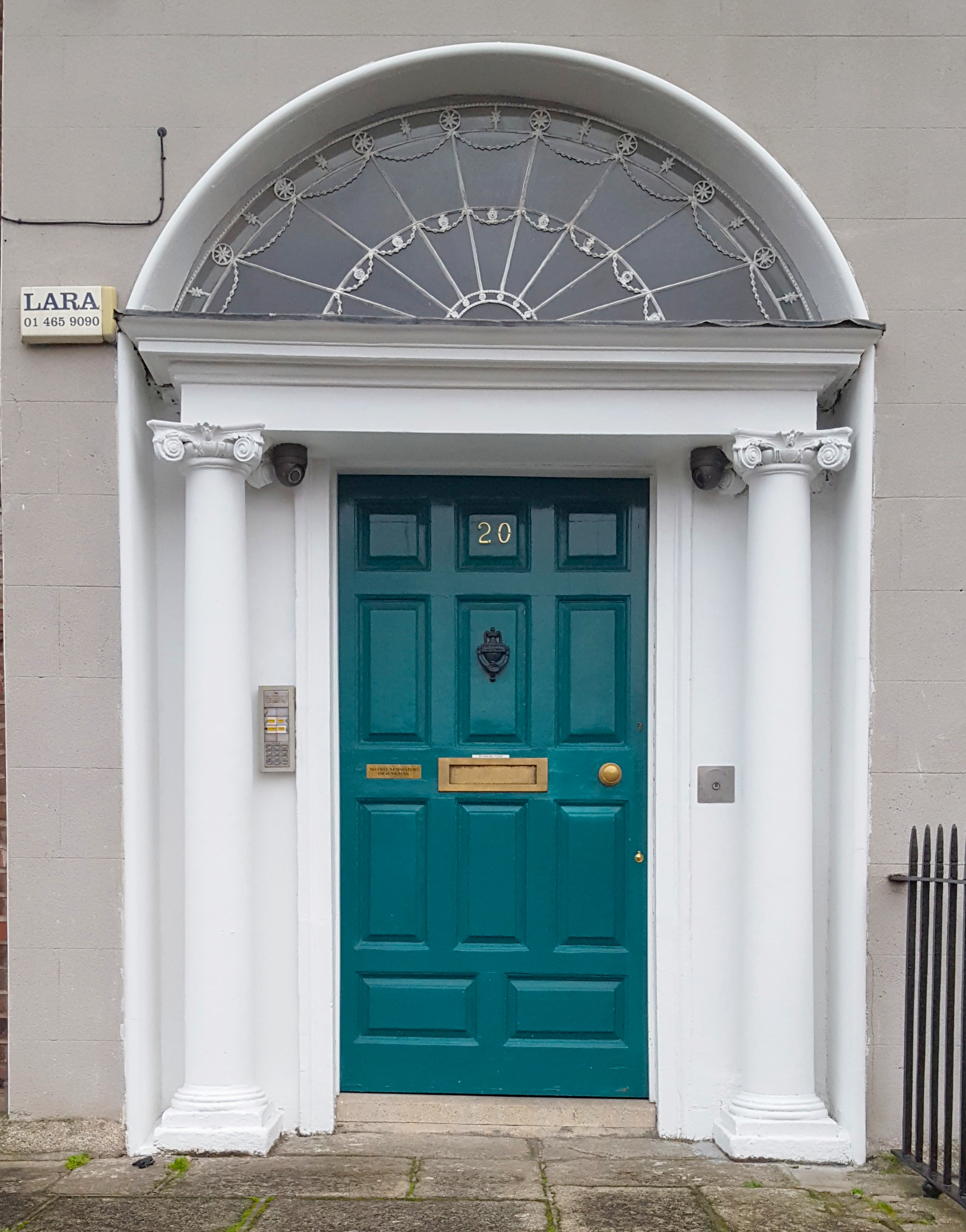
The door to number 20, Mountjoy Square. As is typical of Dublin's Georgian doorways, it is wide-set, painted brightly, and capped by a distinctive fanlight.

In 1825, George Newenham Wright described the square:

This small, regular and elegant square, which is named after the proprietor, Viscount Mountjoy (now Earl of Blessington) is not far from Rutland Square ... The air in this neighbourhood is considered extremely pure, being at the extremity of Dublin, and on the most elevated ground.

Mountjoy Square (Dublin) Improvement Act 1802
- Act of Parliament
- Parliament of the United Kingdom
- Long title: An Act for inclosing and improving Mountjoy Square in the Parish of Saint George, in the County of Dublin.
- Citation: 42 Geo. 3. c. xxxiv

Dates
- Royal assent: 30 April 1802

Text of statute as originally enacted

In 1802, Parliament passed the Mountjoy Square (Dublin) Improvement Act 1802 (42 Geo. 3. c. xxxiv) to govern the election of commissioners for Mountjoy Square on a yearly basis. Commissioner were drawn from residents of the square, and included Joseph Napier, Jacob Owen, James Whiteside, and William Trench, 3rd Earl of Clancarty In the late nineteenth century the park that forms the beating heart of the square was closed to all but the square's residents. Calls from Sir Charles Cameron to throw open the park to the public were rebuffed by the commissioners who called Cameron's open letter an 'audacious proceeding.' The residents' resistance to the attempt to 'provide an additional lung for congested Dublin' were so fierce that The Lancet wrote that despite the park's small size it 'seems sufficient for an Irish battlefield in the holidays.' The park was subsequently opened to the public in the twentieth century.

In 1939, a plebiscite of local ratepayers rejected a proposal to change the name of the square.

Much of the square became tenements from the 1900s when the south side of the city became more fashionable. By the 1960s, large portions of the square were in such poor condition that many were condemned and demolished as dangerous. From 1972 until 1994, the Dublin Corporation's Housing Architects Department had their offices in a former school on the north side of the square. Half of the south side of the square was bought up by Leinster Estates, a company owned by the property developer Matt Gallagher, in the early 1970s. His plan was to build a large office block designed by Desmond FitzGerald. Despite high objections from the Irish Georgian Society (IGI), permission for the office block scheme was granted in October 1967. After a public inquiry, Gallagher offered to sell his land with 7 standing houses and 13 demolished or partly demolished houses to the IGI for £68,000. Despite the formation of Mountjoy Square Estates in an attempt to take up Gallagher's offer, permission was granted for the office scheme again in July 1969. This stipulated that all of the house facades be reinstated, which called into question the financial viability of the project. This led to Mountjoy Square Estates purchasing the plots in December 1969 for £68,000 with the condition that all the houses would be restored individually, and all adhere to the Georgian aesthetic. However, the group could not secure the funds or purchasers willing to restore the buildings, and then continued to decay. After brickwork began to fall into the street, Dublin Corporation demolished many of the houses to first-floor level for safety reasons. In June 1972, the plot was sold to Patrick McCrea. McCrea began work on the site redeveloping it with a Georgian facade, but he ran out of funds. Following his death, the site remained untouched until 1978 when it was purchased by Stephen Treacy, though he failed to progress the project and by 1981 parts of brick cladding from the 1970s construction fell into the street, crushing two cars. Eventually, the whole site was developed with a replica Georgian facade designed by Sean Clifford and Associates.

More recently in 2005, architecture critic Christine Casey stated:

The outstanding feature of Mountjoy Square is its Neoclassical plasterwork, which is finer even than that found in the contemporary terraces on the south side of Merrion Square.

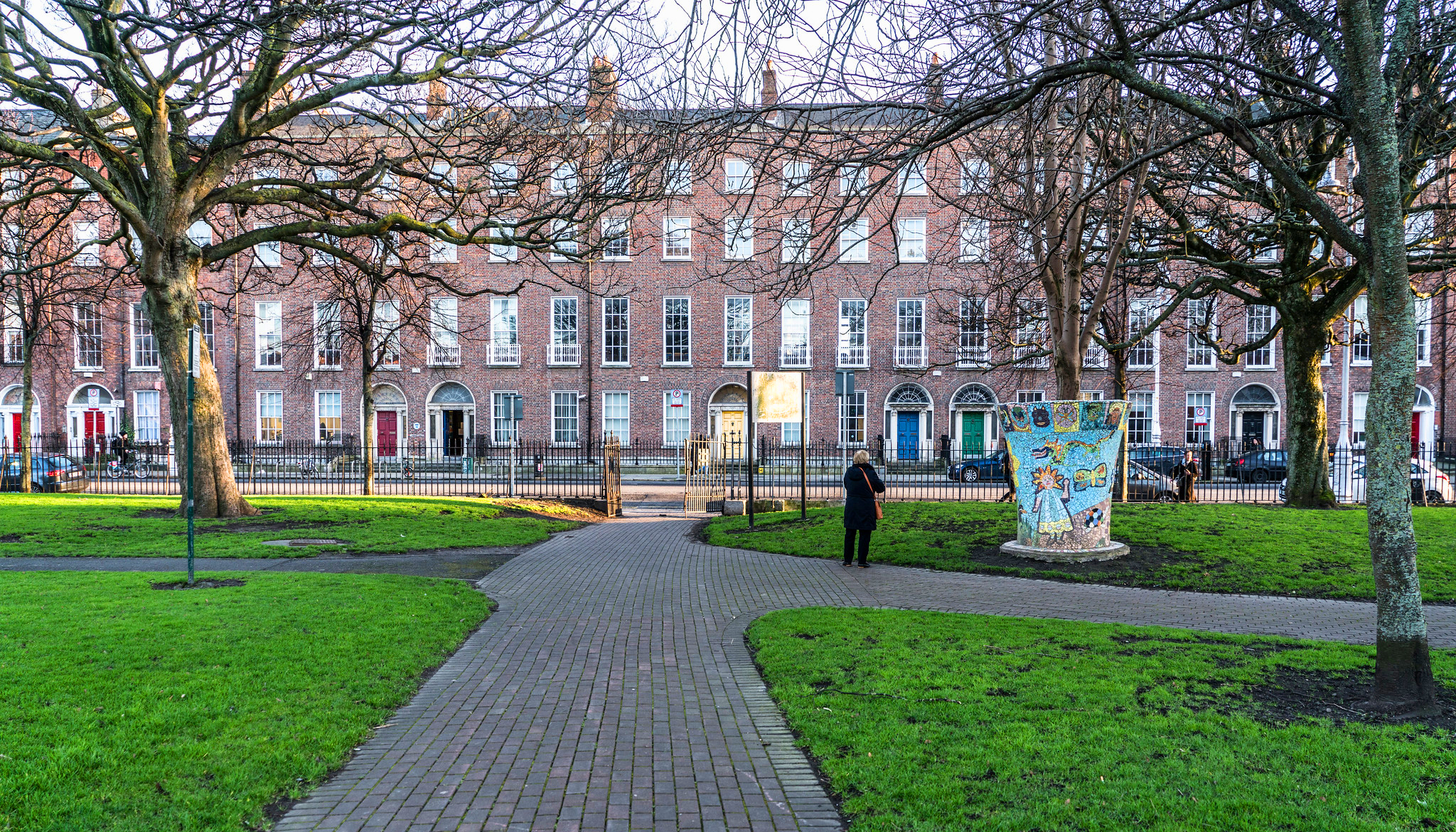
Mountjoy Square as seen from Mountjoy Square Park

== Notable residents ==
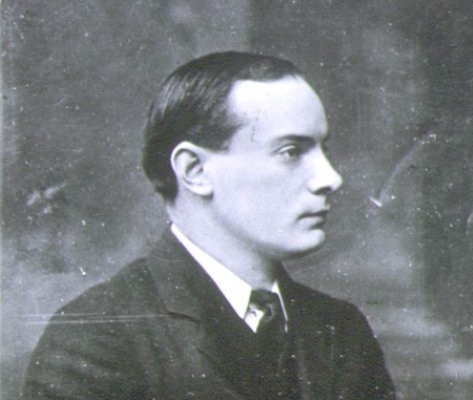
Patrick Pearse attended meetings in Mountjoy Square in planning the 1916 Easter Rising, of which he was a leader.

Mountjoy Square has had many famous inhabitants throughout its history. The earliest was Arthur Guinness, who died there in January 1803. Subsequently, his descendant Desmond Guinness and first wife Mariga, attempted to save and restore the gracious character of the square in 1966–75, buying No. 50 and several demolished lots with members of the Irish Georgian Society.

Seán O'Casey, the Irish playwright and founder member of the Irish Citizen Army, lived in a tenement in no. 35 Mountjoy Square, during the Irish War of Independence. During his time there, it is said that the house was raided by the Black and Tans. John O'Leary, a leading Fenian, poet, editor of The Irish People, mentioned in W. B. Yeats' poem September 1913, lived at no. 53 Mountjoy Square West in the late 19th century and early 20th century. Yeats, as a friend of O'Leary, is known to have stayed at 53 Mountjoy Square and sent letters from there. Dáil Éireann, the parliament of Ireland, having been suppressed by the British authorities as a dangerous organisation in September 1919, met before the foundation of the Irish Free State at the home of the republican Walter L. Cole in Mountjoy Square. When the volunteers met on Easter Monday 1916, the 1st battalion met at Blackhall Street in the liberties with the intention of taking over the Four Courts. The exception was the twelve men of D company under the command of Captain Seán Heuston who met at Mountjoy Square with the mission of taking the Mendicity Institution across the river from the four courts. Tim Healy resided at 1 Mountjoy Square, having lived previously on the adjacent Great Charles Street in number 50.

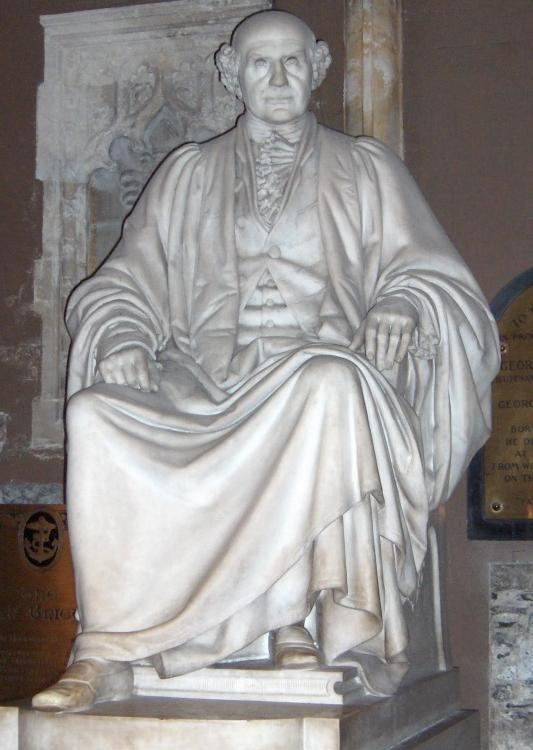
Statue of James Whiteside in St Patrick's Cathedral, Dublin

James Whiteside (1804–1876), writer, orator, politician and barrister lived at no. 2 Mountjoy Square North in the mid-19th century. The eminent family of architects which included Jacob Owen and James Higgins Owen lived at no. 2 Mountjoy Square West (now no. 54) from the 1830s to the 1860s. Joseph Napier, an Irish Conservative party MP and member of the Privy Council of Ireland lived at No. 17 Mountjoy Square South (now no. 52). Richard Dowse (1824–1890) lived at no. 38 Mountjoy Square. Born in Dungannon, during his career he was MP for Londonderry (1868–1872), Attorney General, Solicitor General and a Baron of the Court of the Exchequer. Sir Robert Anderson (1841–1918) was born at Number 1 Mountjoy Square West (now 53). An infamous brothel, known as The Kasbah Health Studio, frequented by numerous senior Irish businessmen, politicians and churchmen was located in the basement of number 60 Mountjoy Square West from the late 1970s until its closure in the early 1990s.

Seán O'Casey set all three of his "Dublin Trilogy" (The Shadow of a Gunman, Juno and the Paycock and The Plough and the Stars) in tenement houses in Georgian Dublin. In particular, The Shadow of a Gunman opens in A return-room in a tenement house in Hilljoy Square which is raided by the Auxiliaries during the play. This room is thought to have been based on O'Casey's former tenement home. Although the original house was demolished in the 1960s, it was later replaced by a building with a Georgian façade that now stands on the site. O'Casey subsequently lived in another Georgian house very close to Mountjoy Square at 422 North Circular Road; in that house which still stands today, is where he wrote the trilogy, before later moving to London during the nineteen twenties.

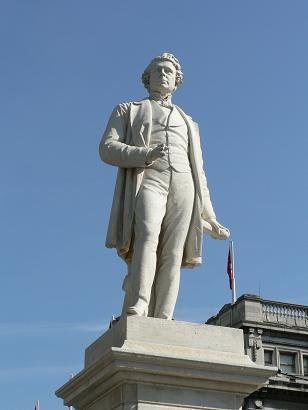
Sicilian marble statue of Sir John Gray, sculpted by Thomas Farrell who lived on Mountjoy Square, and erected in nearby O'Connell Street in 1879.

The stuccatore Michael Stapleton, who built three houses there, was resident in the square from 1793 to 1795. Stapleton subsequently moved into a house at 1 Mountjoy Place, just off the south east corner of the square. Charles Thorp, another stuccadore also developed three houses on the east side, numbers 19 to 21, and is recorded as residing in number 19 in the 1835 Almanac Registry Directory. Sculptors and brothers James and Thomas Farrell lived in number 30, which is sited along the east side of the square. Two of Farrell's sculptures can be seen on the central median of nearby O'Connell Street at the junction with Abbey Street, with a statue on either side of the Luas tracks.

Padraig O'Faolain, an Irish painter, lived next to the Kasbah on Mountjoy Square West in the 1980s. Irish radio presenter, journalist, former Trinity College SU president and student activist Joe Duffy was born on Mountjoy Square in 1956.

Much of John Carney's 2007 feature film Once which won the Academy Award that year for best original song was filmed in an apartment on Mountjoy Square East, where the female lead character, played by Marketa Irglova, lives with her family. Several scenes from Georgie's Story, the third episode of Mark O'Halloran's award-winning television mini-series Prosperity, screened on RTÉ in 2007, were filmed in and around Mountjoy Square park.

The rock/pop band U2 used to rehearse in a squat on Mountjoy Square in the late 1970s and were photographed by Patrick Brocklebank, published in "The Dublin Music Scene and U2, 1978–81".

== Education ==
- The School of Art, Design & Printing and the Department of Social Sciences of the Dublin Institute of Technology are based at nos. 40–45 Mountjoy Square.
- Public Affairs Ireland is based at 25 Mountjoy Square.
- The Incorporated Society for Promoting Protestant Schools in Ireland and Mountjoy School were located at nos. 6–7 Mountjoy Square until a move to Malahide Road in 1950, becoming Mount Temple School.
- Dorset College currently has an office on the corner of Mountjoy Square East and Great Charles Street.
- The Dublin Adult Learning Centre is currently based at 3 Mountjoy Square.
- The St. Francis Xavier Pioneer Club of Dublin is based at 27 Mountjoy Square.
- CELT Ireland English School is based on the east side of the square in an historic Georgian house.
- Divinity Hostel, for the training of Anglican priests, was located at 25 Mountjoy Sq., from 1913 until 1964 eventually becoming the Church of Ireland Theological Institute.

== Amenities ==
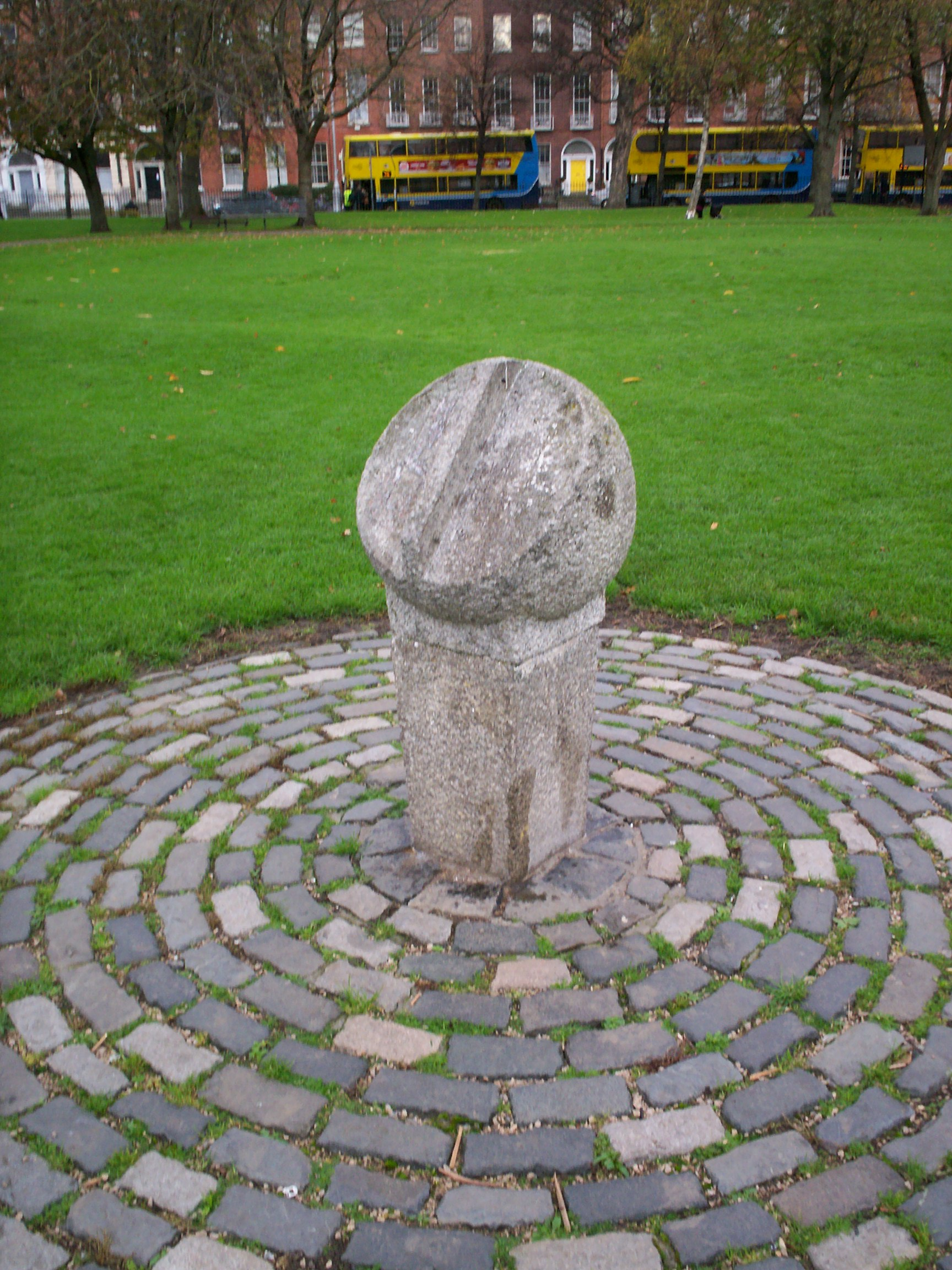
Granite sundial in green area of Mountjoy Square

The square's park was likely levelled during its initial construction given the sloping site. It is a 4-acre park, which was used for building rubble at first, and was described as a waste ground. On 8 May 1801, the residents gathered and decided to petition parliament to enclose and improve the park and pledged 5 guineas each. This group became the Mountjoy Square Commissioners, and held their first official meeting on 19 June 1901, and would go on to administer the park until 1938. Following an act of parliament, work began designed by the landscape architect, John Sutherland, on 30 April 1802 despite not having enough funds for the whole plan. The railings were manufactured by John and James Clarke, and an initial 80 iron globe gas lamps were added to the park. The total costs for these improvements cost £3,500 by about 1805. Each of the square's 100 residents were issued with one of a key to the 4 gates.

An assistant gardener employed in 1809 also ensured that "improper persons" entered the park, which was later upped to 4 "stout constables" in 1811. From 1830, other local residents could enter the park for a fee of 1 guinea per family annually. By 1836, anyone could use the park for a fee of 4d. By the 1830s, the park had seating and marquee tents. From 1866, croquet and running competitions were held in the park, and in 1881 a tennis club was founded. Frederick Moore, curator of the Botanic Gardens, was asked to survey the park in 1883 and found it neglected and in need to improved facilities.

In 1927, a tennis pavilion was added. Dublin Corporation offered to take over the park and create a children's playground in 1933, but this proposal was rejected. The Corporation then petitioned Dáil Éireann, which resulted in the Mountjoy Square Act, 1938 which passed the park from the care of the commissioners to the corporation. The park had a playground by 1947, by which time the houses were largely tenements. The Corporation built a small depot in the park in 1965 in the north-east corner. The park was remodelled again, with paths and additional planting with the central sundial in the 1980s.

Trees in the park include Norway maple, sycamore, beech, and London plane. Two trees have large concrete surrounds at the base which are decorated with mosaics celebrating Irish Traveller life. A new playground was installed in 2004, and the planting has become more focused on biodiversity. It has both playing areas for football, basketball and table tennis, and a green park area. The Dublin City Development plan 2011-2017 suggested restoring the park to its original configuration, work that would result in the removal or movement of many of the amenities added in the 20th and 21st centuries. It also suggested adding a cafe and toilets to the park. It is also a short walk to the Blessington Street Basin in Broadstone.

== Architectural Conservation Area ==
In 2010 as part of the preparation by Dublin City Council of their City Development Plan, they received a number of representations calling for Mountjoy Square to be designated as an Architectural Conservation Area (ACA). On 14 May 2012, a meeting of Dublin City Council formally established Mountjoy Square as an Architectural Conservation Area.

ACA designation gives protection to the entire streetscape of the square. Works to any building in the area now require the permission of the Planning Authority, whether the building is a Protected Structure (Listed Building) or not.

In 2018, the Dublin City Council proposed restoring Mountjoy Square to its 1837 design by re-creating the 4.4-acre park at its centre. These plans were withdrawn in 2019.

== Transport links ==
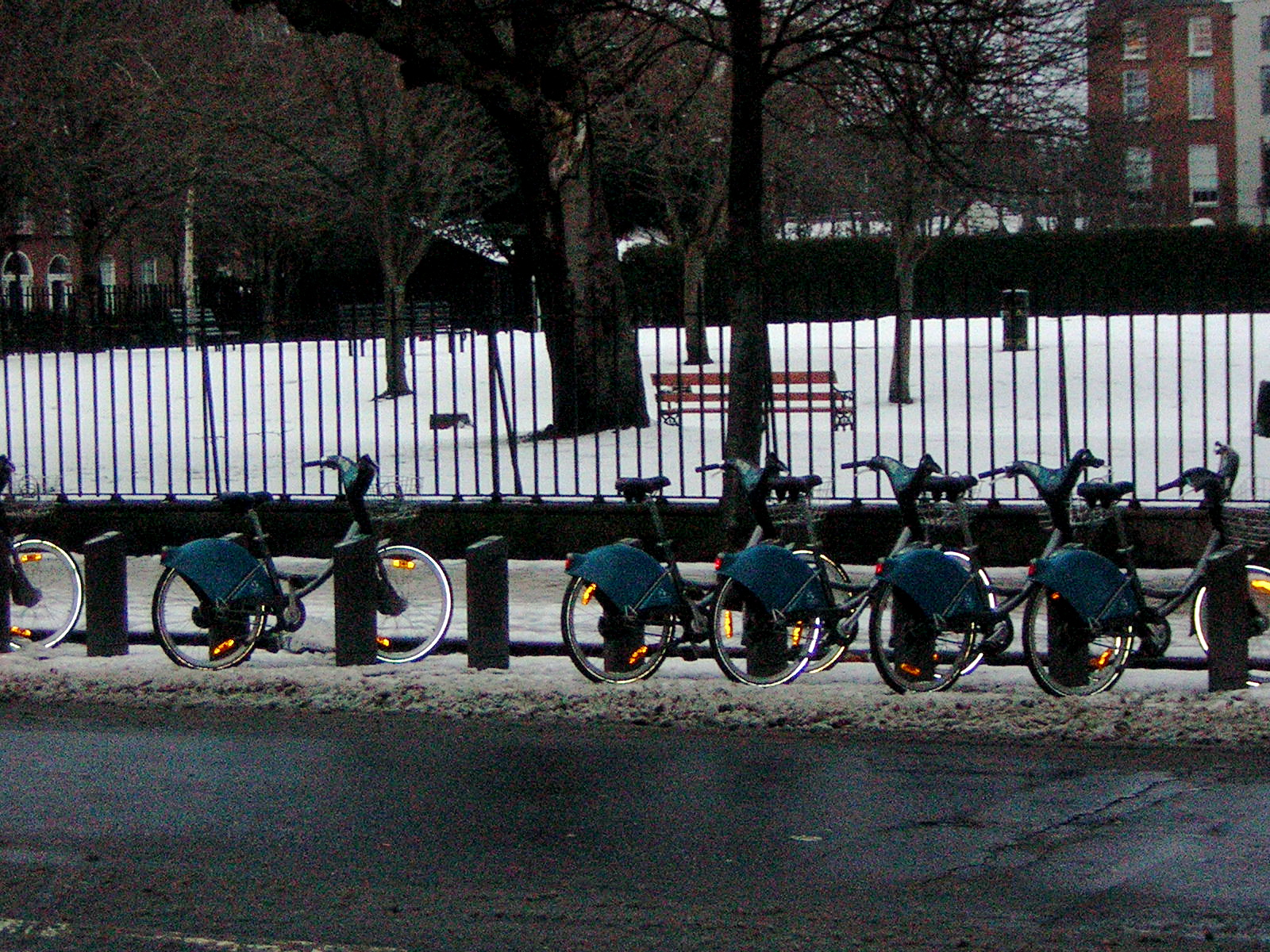
DublinBikes Station on Mountjoy Square

Close to the centre of Dublin city and having the major artery Gardiner Street as its West side, Mountjoy Square has considerable transport links in its immediate locality.

The Dublin Bus termini for the 7, 7a, 7b, 7d and 46e are on the north side of the square and run toward the southeast of the city. Routes 33, 41, 41b and 41c stop on the west side of the square on their way to the northern suburbs. The square's bus stops are also covered by the hop-on, hop-off city centre 75-cent fare. The 41 bus is almost certainly the cheapest transport link to Dublin Airport from the city at €2.70 (as of 2017) from the square. The main entrance to Dublin Bus' Summerhill Depot is on Mountjoy Place, just off the southeast corner of the square.

In 2009, the Dublin Bikes bicycle sharing system was launched and has one of its more northerly stations on the west side of Mountjoy Square, providing easy access for commuters, locals, and tourists.

In 2013 a similar pay-as-you-go car hire scheme stationed a car on the square. The "Go-Car" is parked on Mountjoy Square West.

== Period features ==
Over the centuries, new features have been added to the street furniture while for various reasons others have been removed.

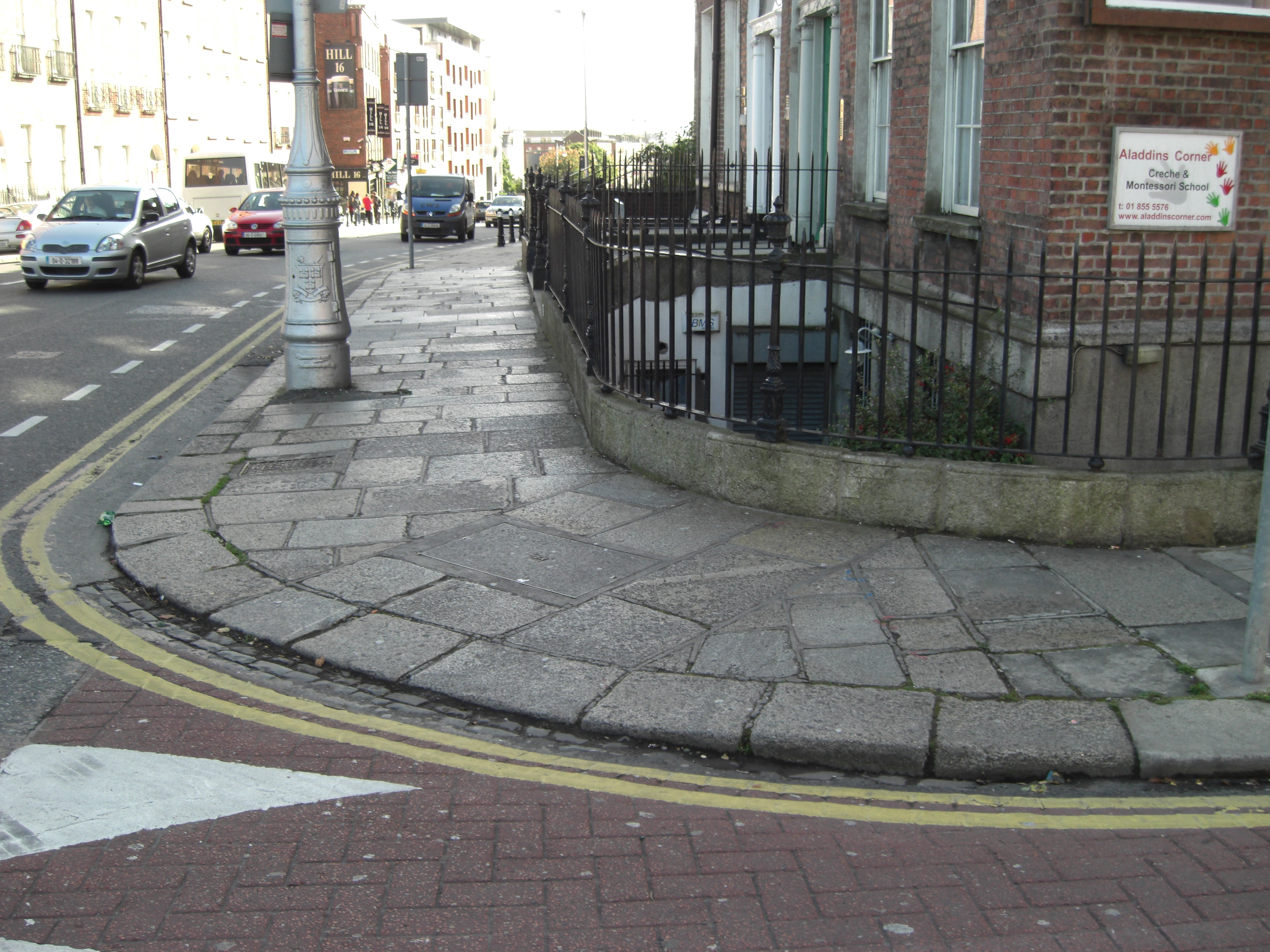
Remaining granite paving

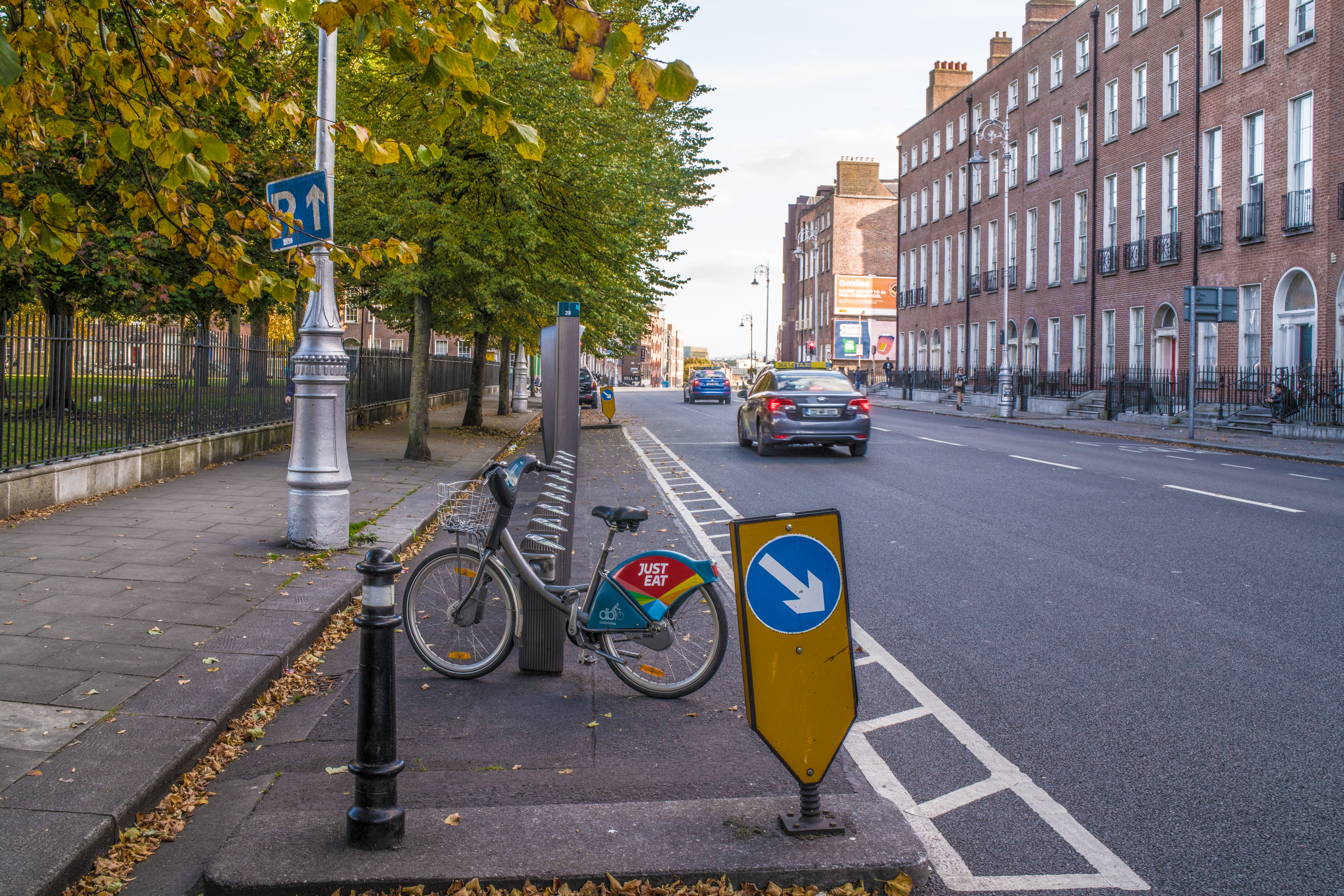
Mountjoy Square West in 2018

The footpath was originally paved with granite. By now, although the kerbs are generally still (probably Wicklow) granite, most of the paving stones have been replaced with concrete. The exception to this is the southwest corner in front of 53–54 which still has full granite paving and a small section just off of Mountjoy Square in front of the Free Church.

Many of the houses on the square still have their original coal holes and ornate cast iron covers. These small holes in the street outside each house lead to a coal house underneath the street. These elegantly solved the problem of how to quickly and cleanly deliver coal to the house, allowing the coal men to simply pull the hole open and empty their sacks of coal down through it. The basement of the house then had a doorway into the coal house under the street, many of which remain intact.

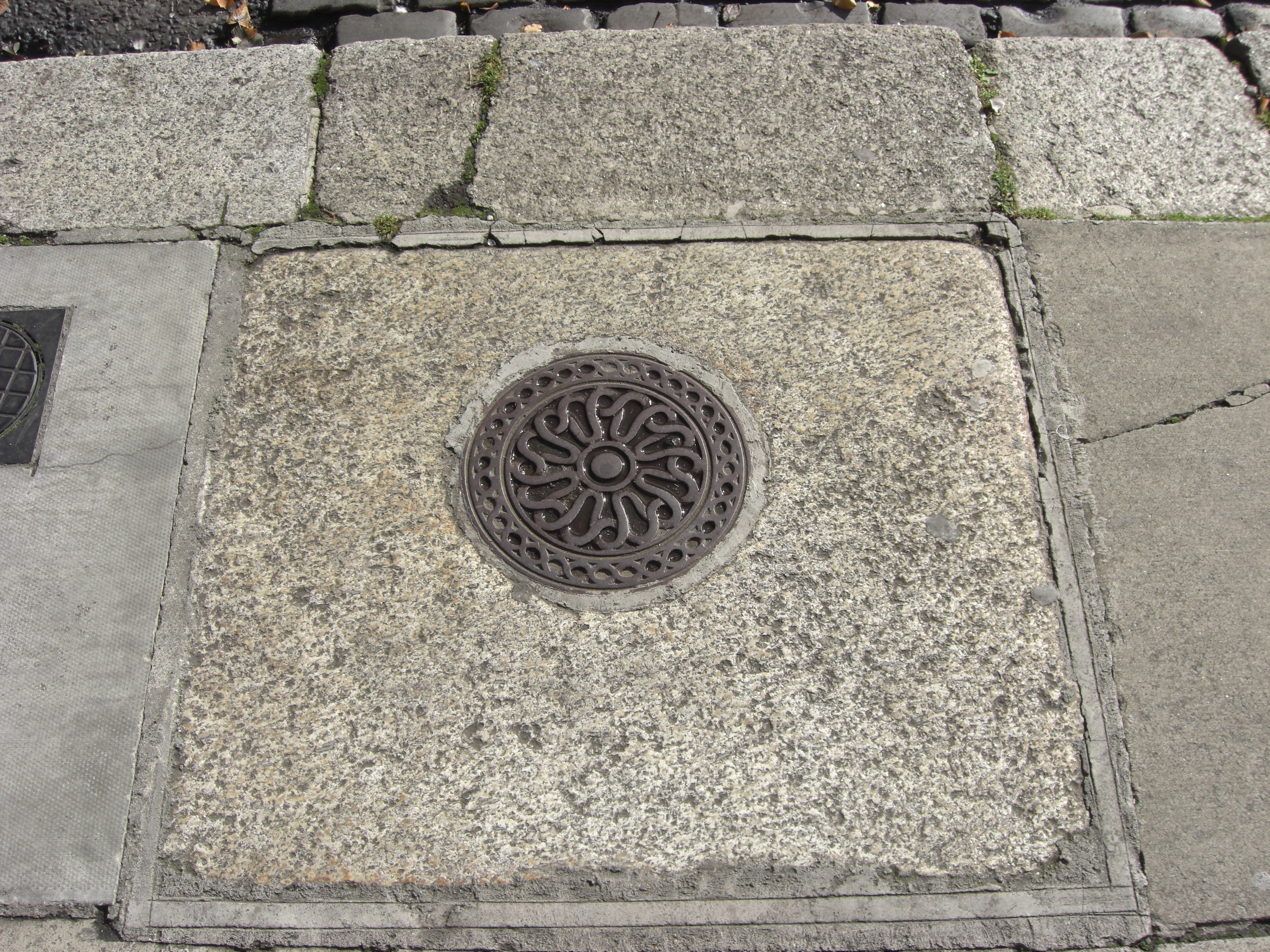
Ornate coal hole cover

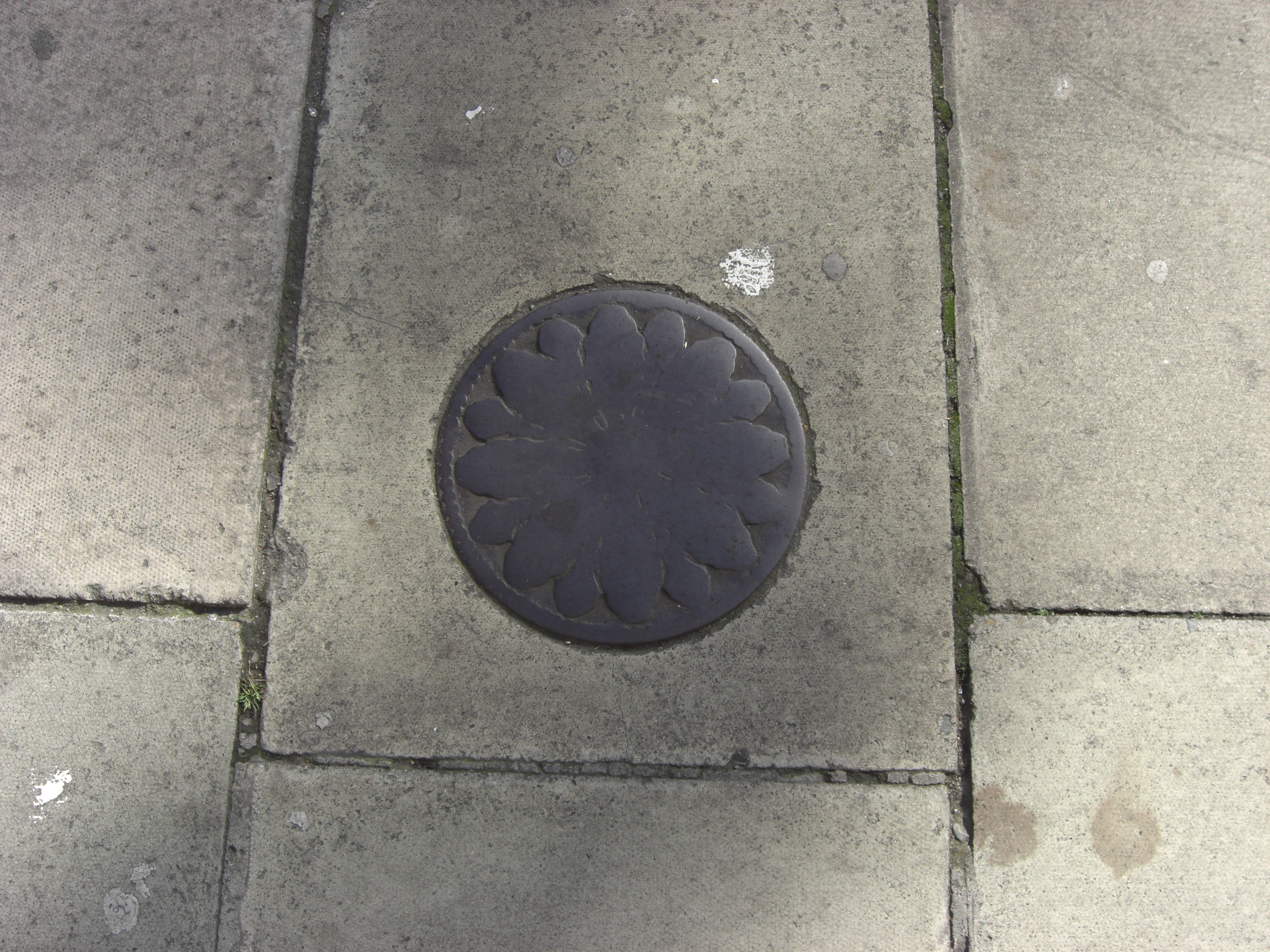
Ornate coal hole cover

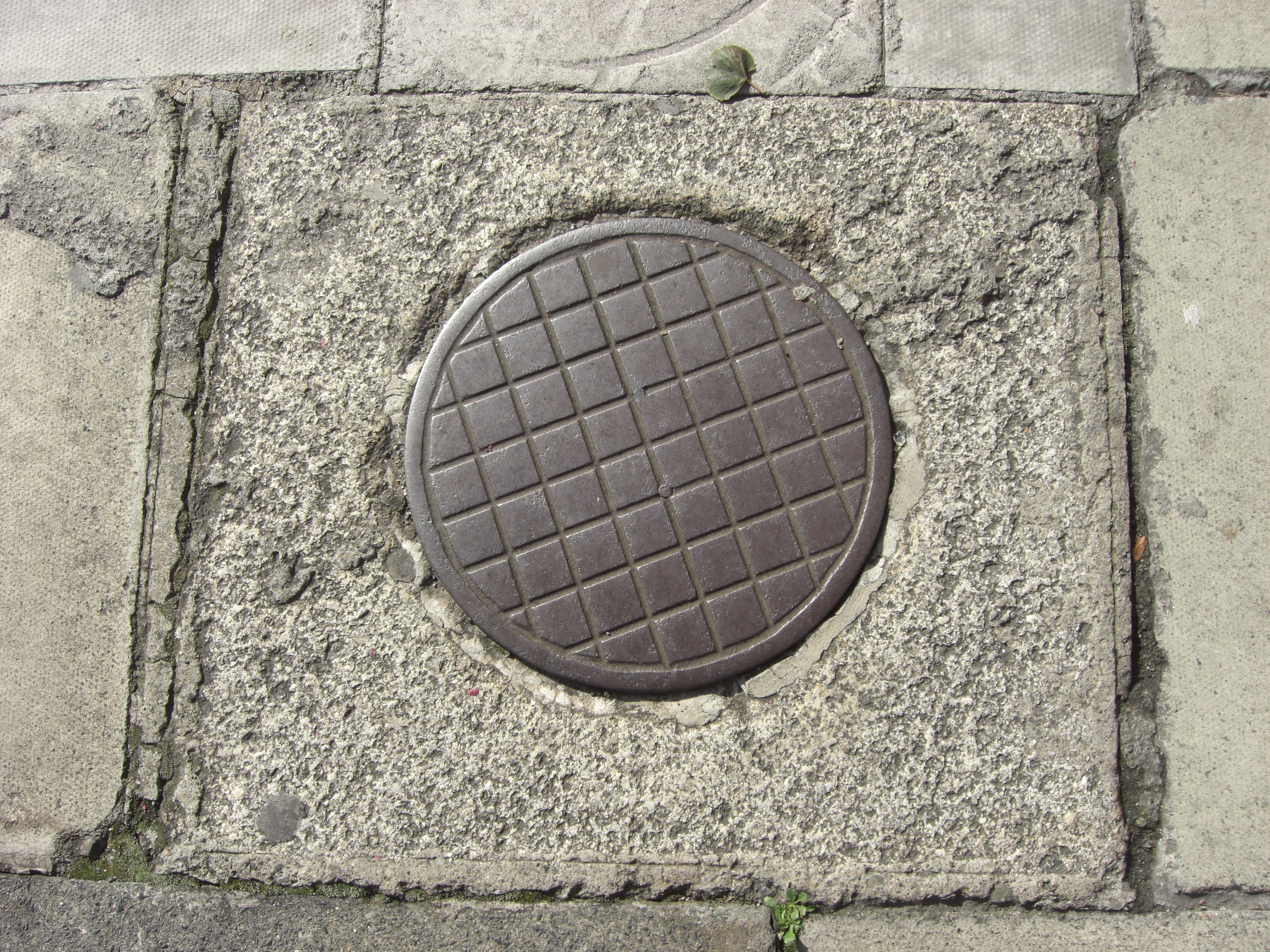
Ornate coal hole cover

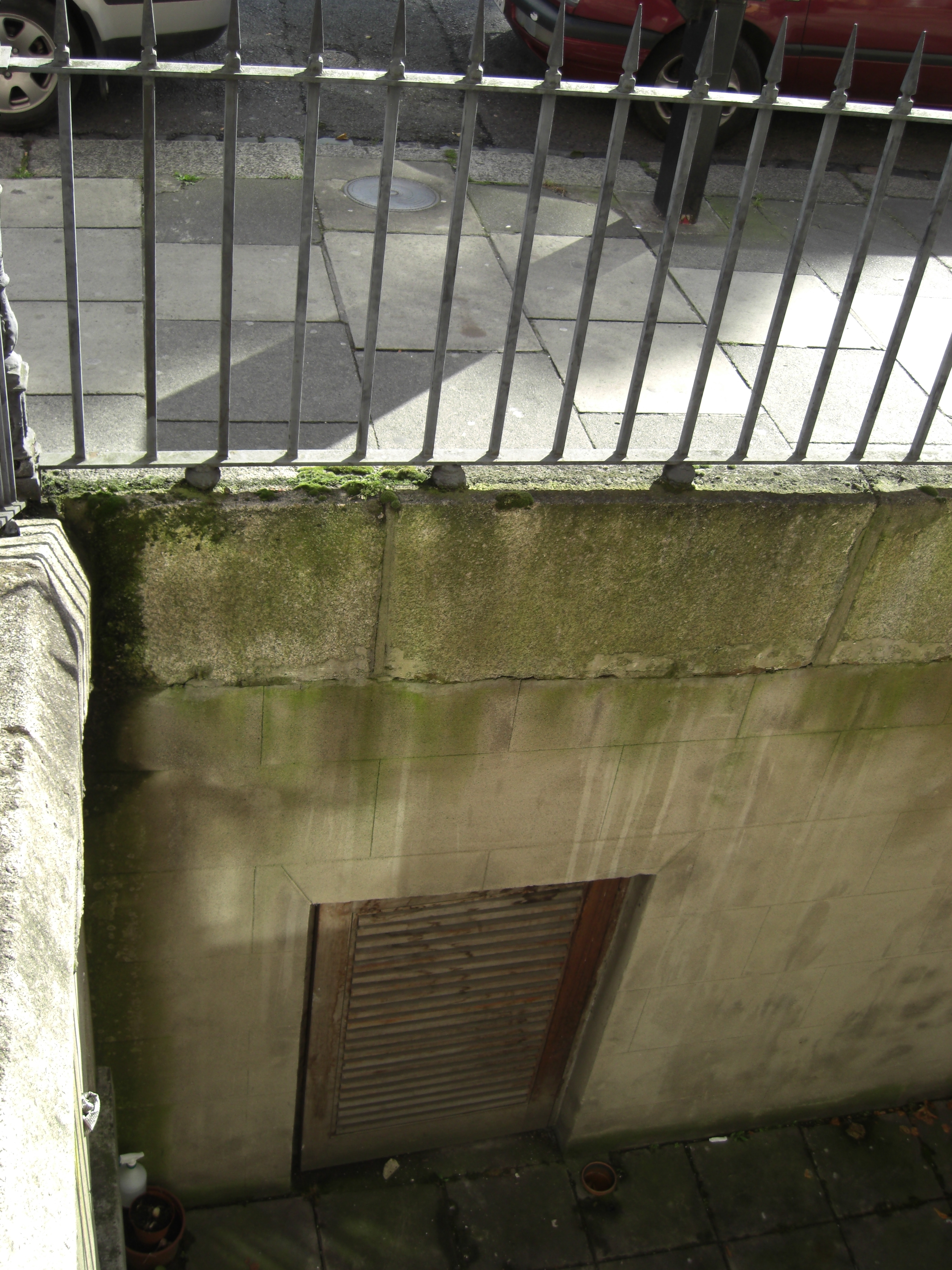
Coal hole and doorway under street

The street lamps on the square are of two different designs. Those on the outer sides, in front of the houses, are seemingly of the style called The Scotch Standard, dating from 1903 to 1920 when Dublin streets were being electrically lit as part of the Pigeon House scheme. On the inner (park) side of the street, a slightly more modest design is used, apparently consistent with a more recent 1940–50 design. These designs are all 9 metres tall. Prior to the installation of public lighting schemes, most houses would have had a cast iron gas lamp holder atop the railings at the bottom of the granite steps. As of 2020 few of these remain intact around the city with notable examples at nearby North Great Georges' Street and Great Denmark Street.

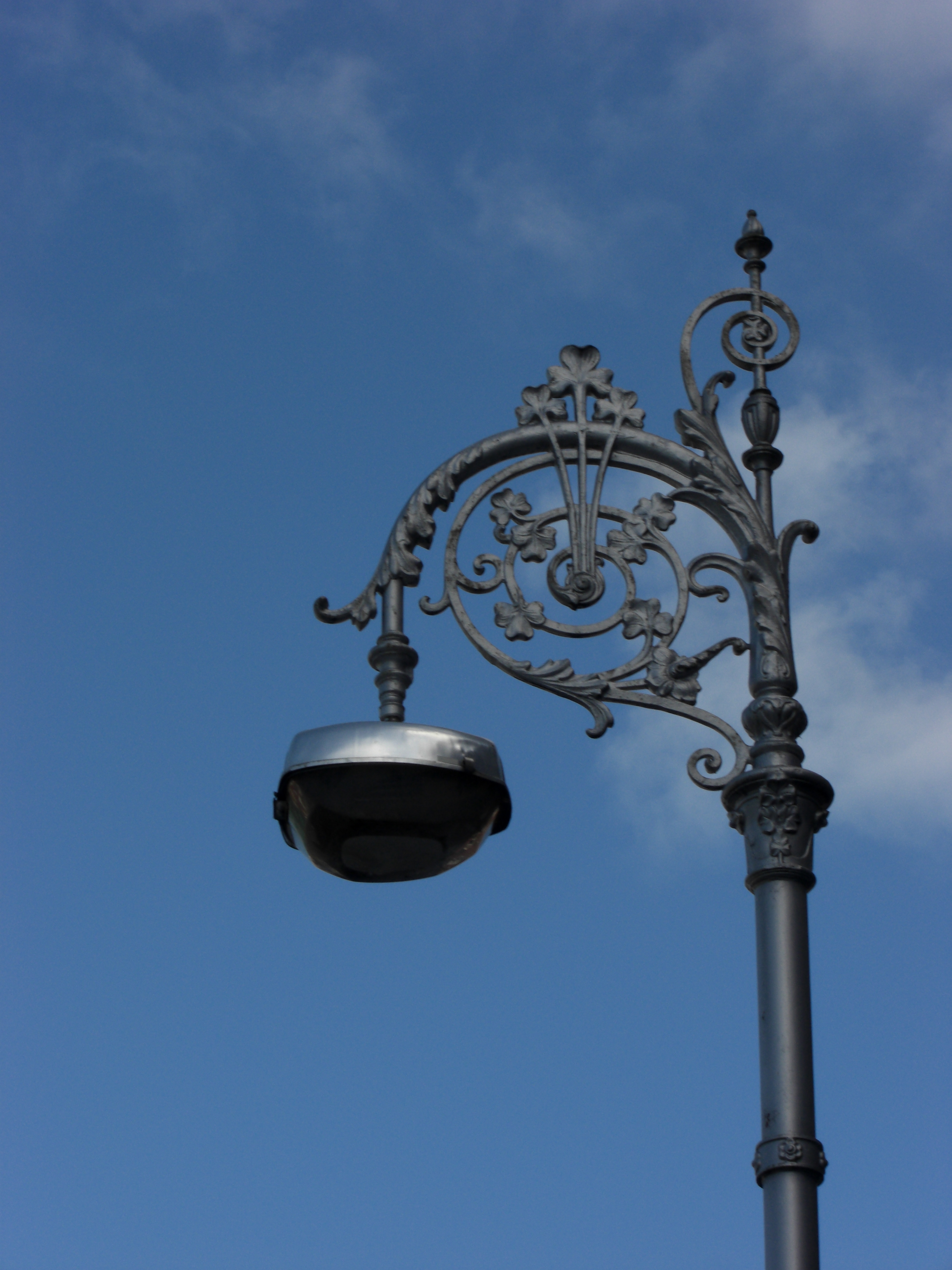
The Scotch Standard Lamp Post (outer side)

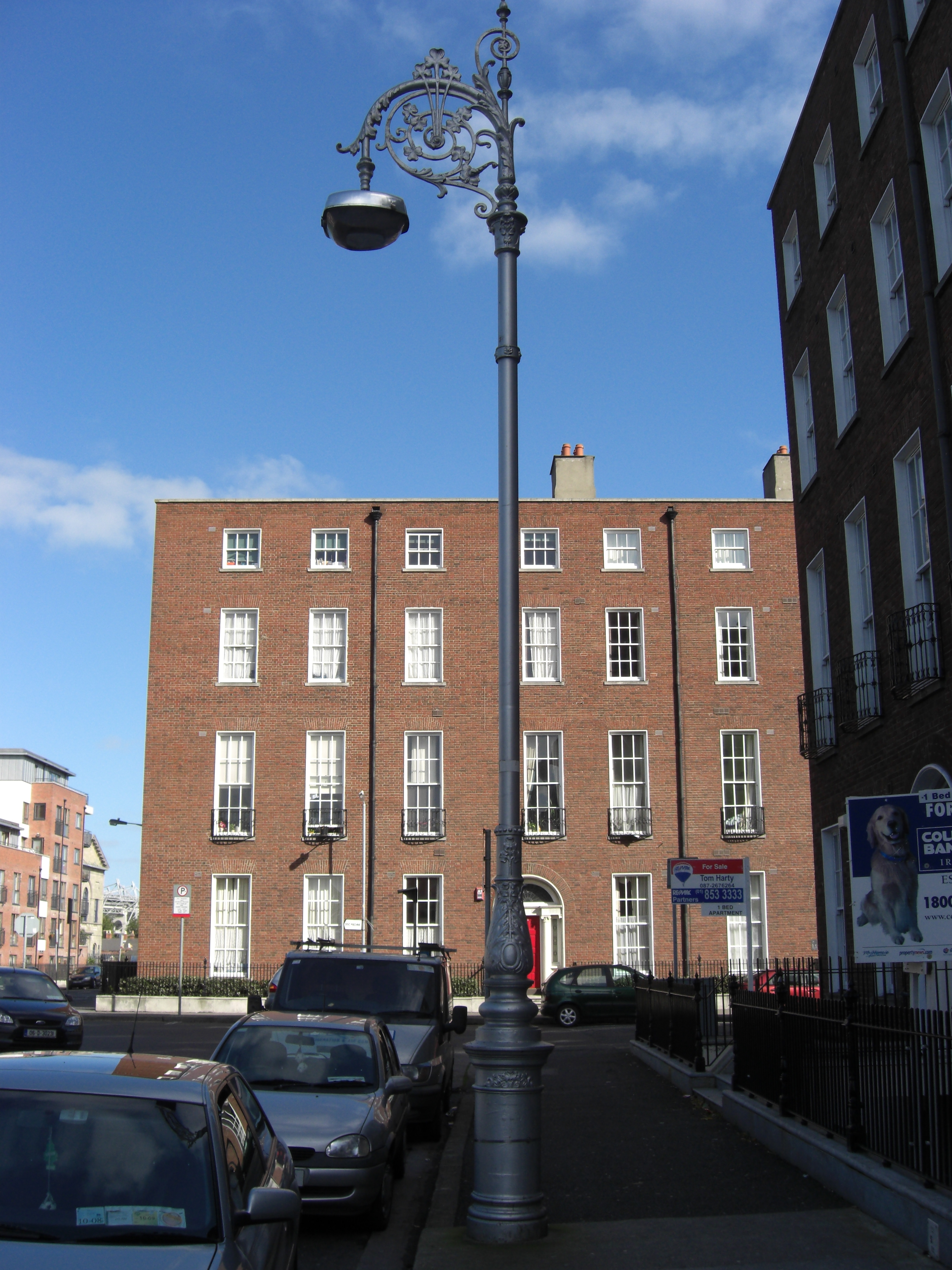
The Scotch Standard Lamp Post (outer side)

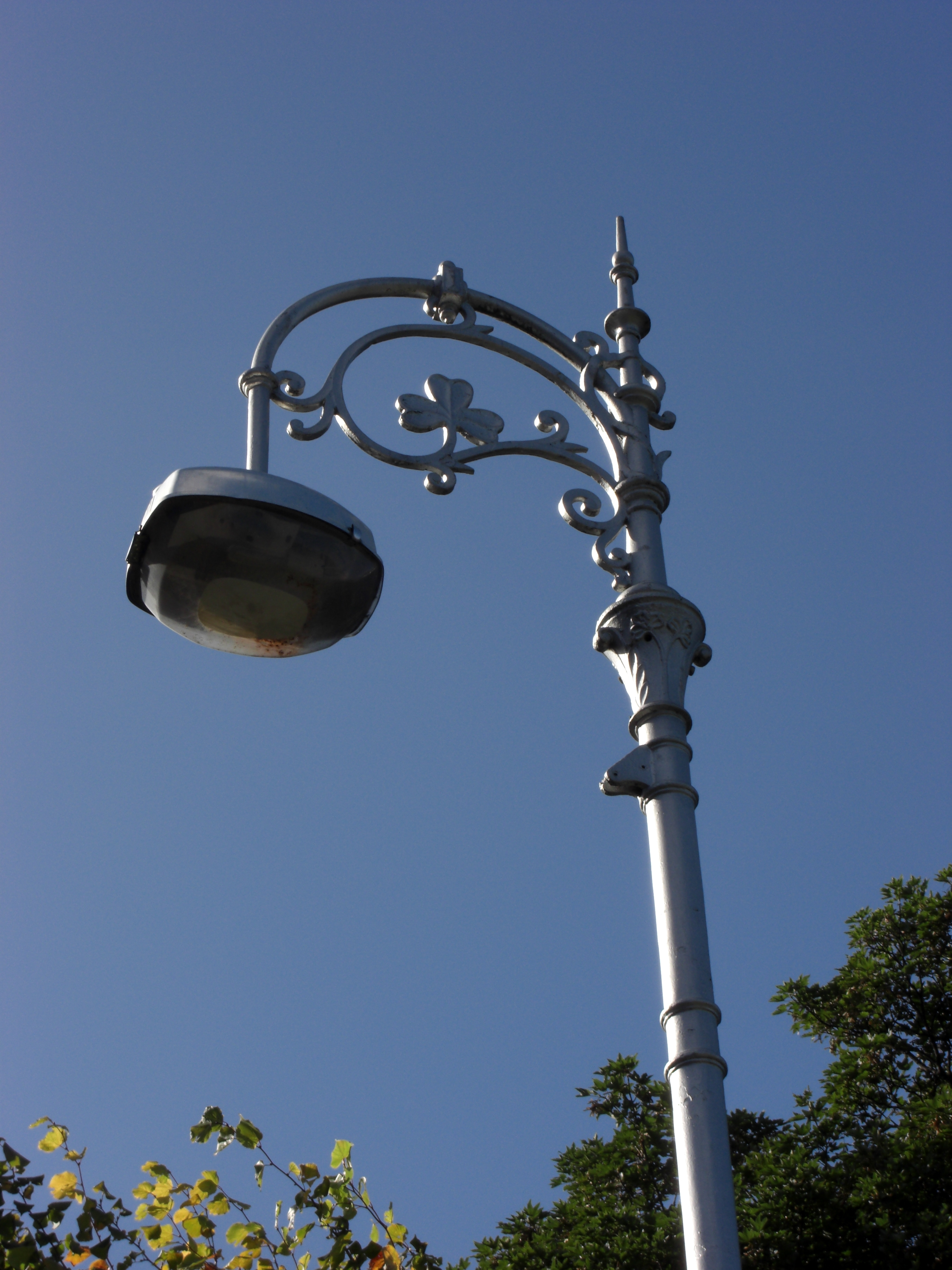
Decorative Shamrock Lamp Post (park side)

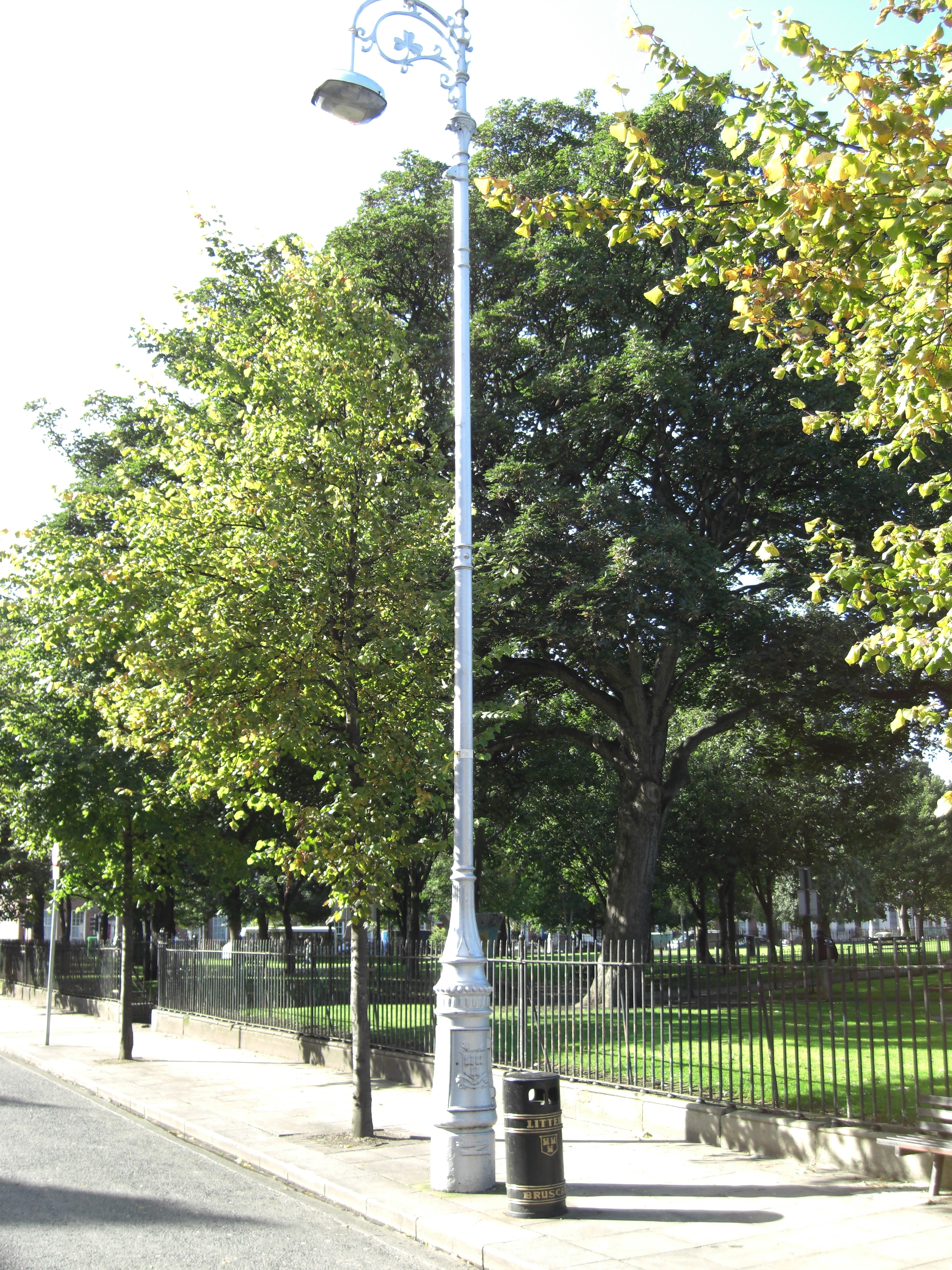
Decorative Shamrock Lamp Post (park side)

In the late 18th century, mud streets were not uncommon and horses were also common on the streets. To avoid this muck being tramped into the houses, boot scrapers were commonly placed outside their front doors. Many of these were highly elaborate and many remain to this day.

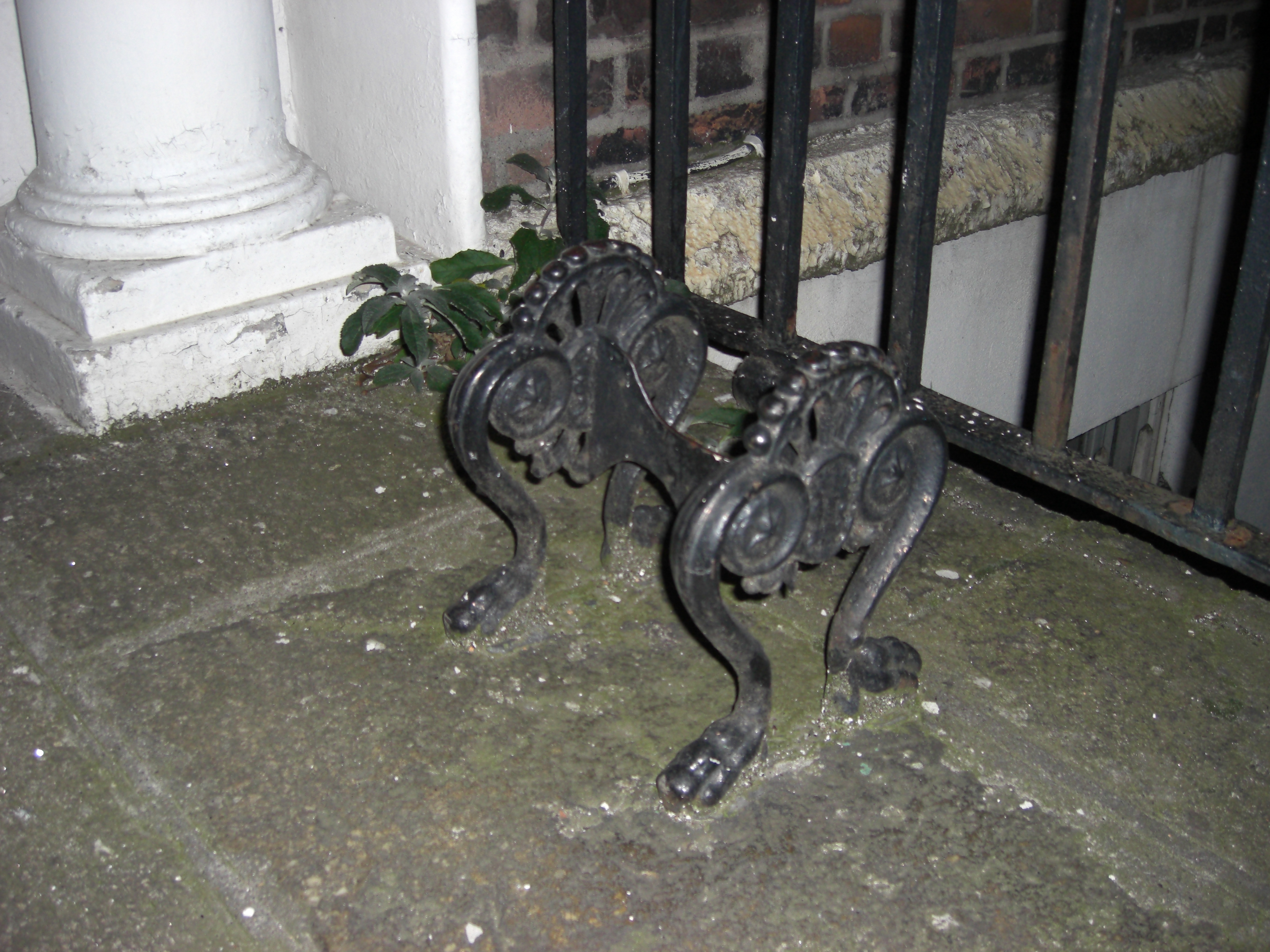
Scraper

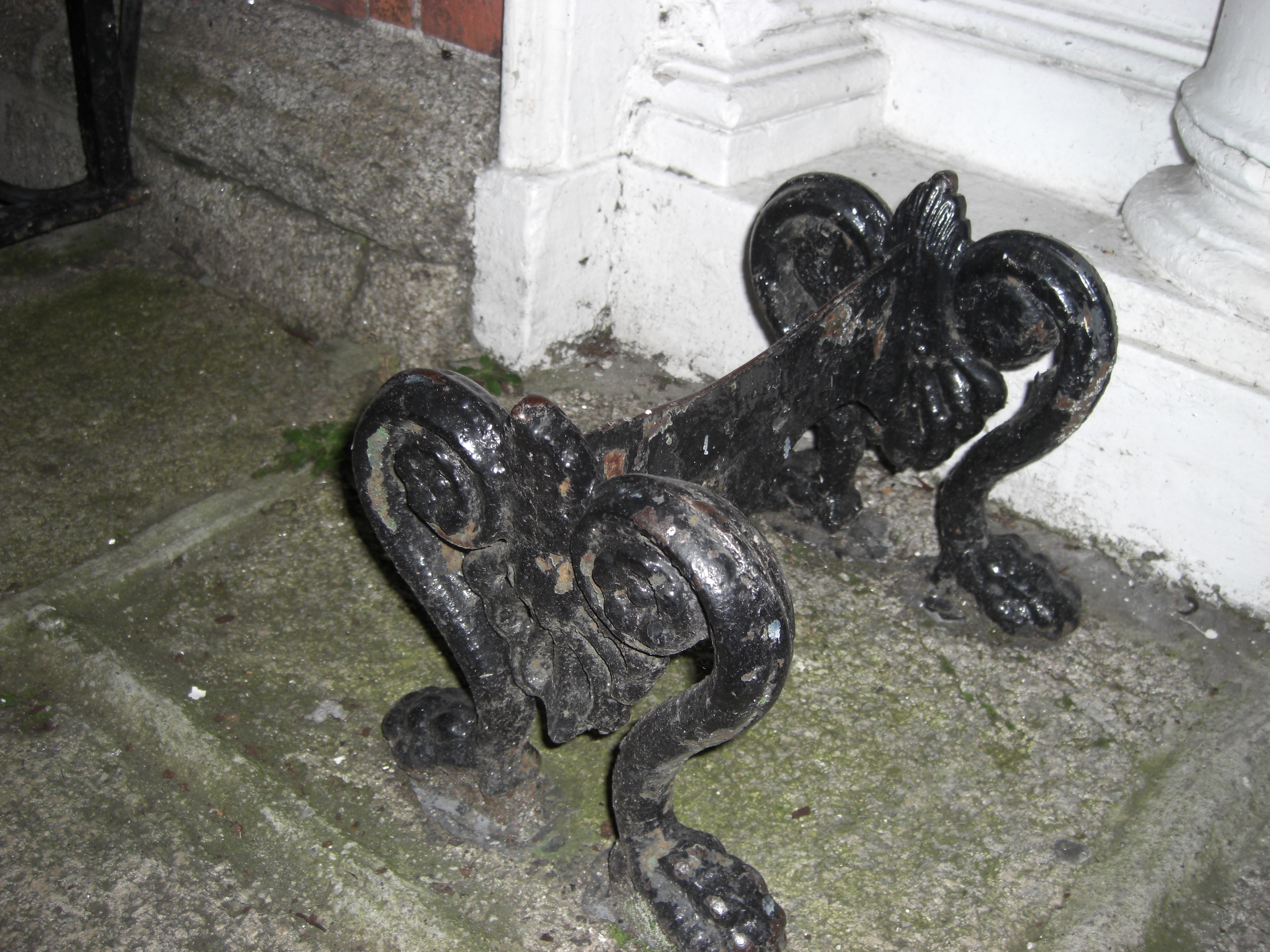
Scraper

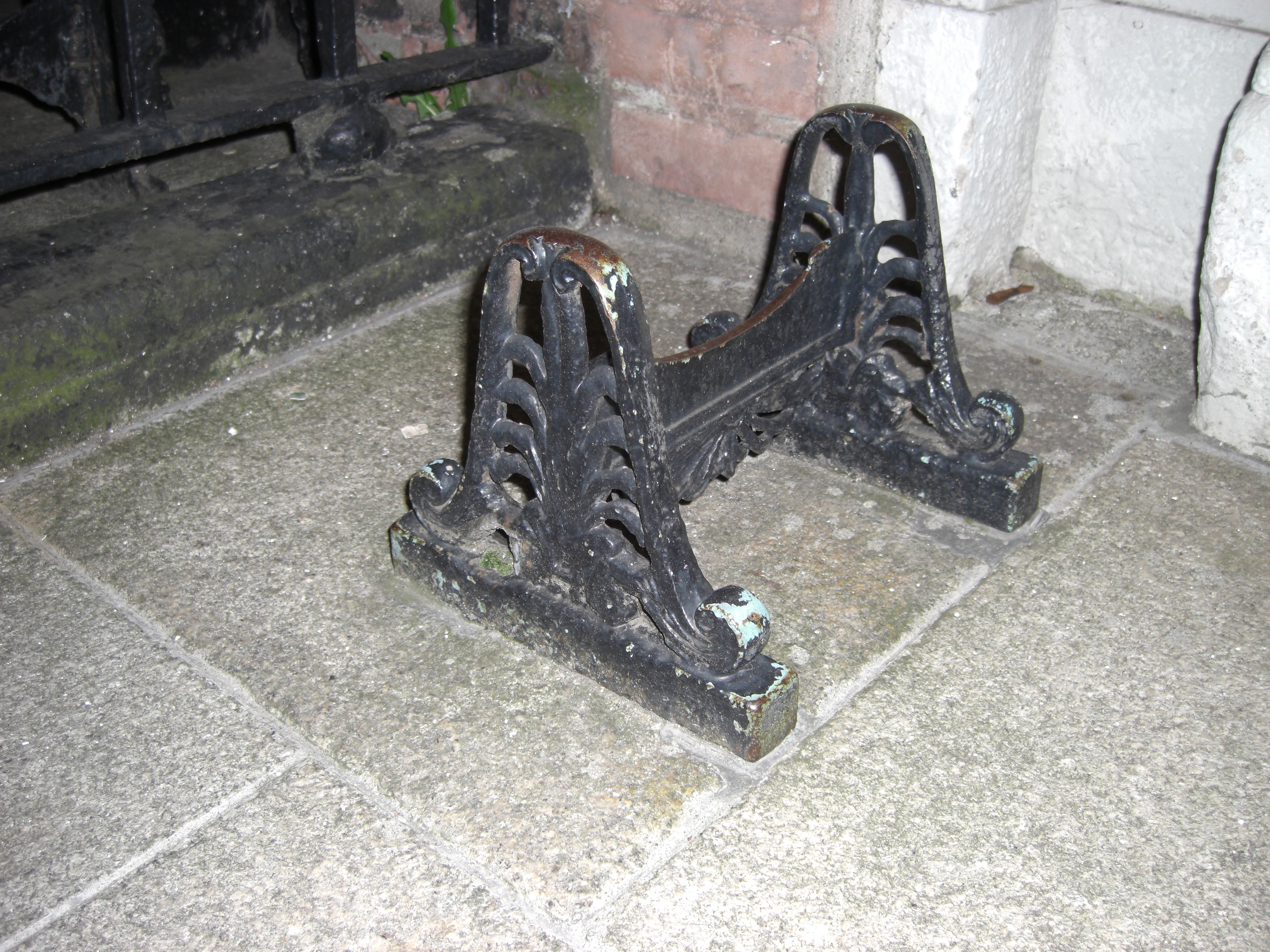
Scraper

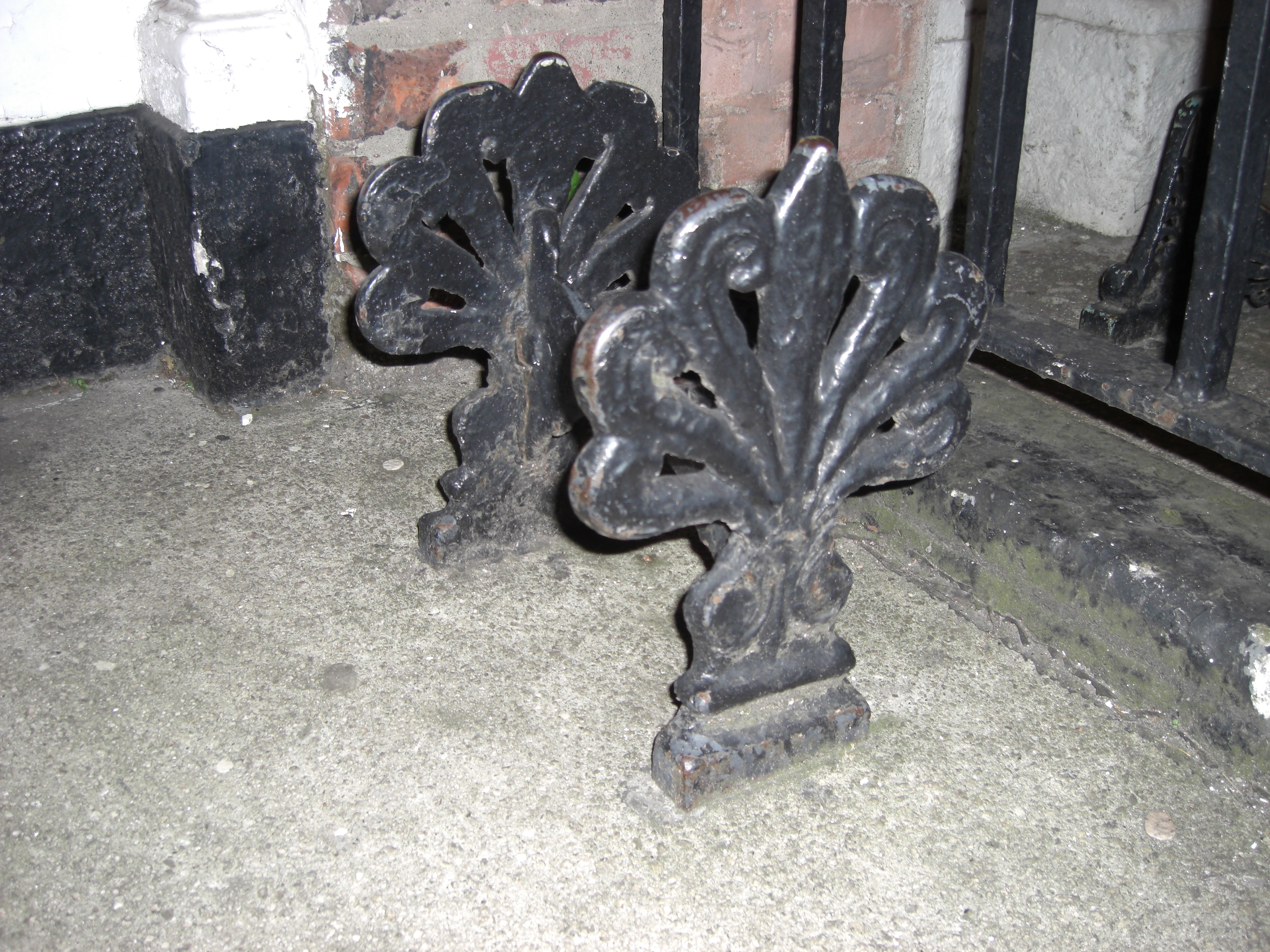
Scraper

Some of the houses still contain their original wrought iron balconettes while others have since been replaced with more modern replacements.

== See also ==
- List of streets and squares in Dublin
