= Joseph Farrell (sculptor) =

Irish sculptor

- Born: 1823; Dublin, Ireland
- Died: 1904 (aged 80–81); Dublin
- Known for: Sculpture
- Relatives: Terence Farrell (father), James Farrell (brother), Thomas Farrell, John Farrell (brother)

Joseph Farrell (1823—1904) was an Irish sculptor known for his ecclesiastical commissions.

== Life ==
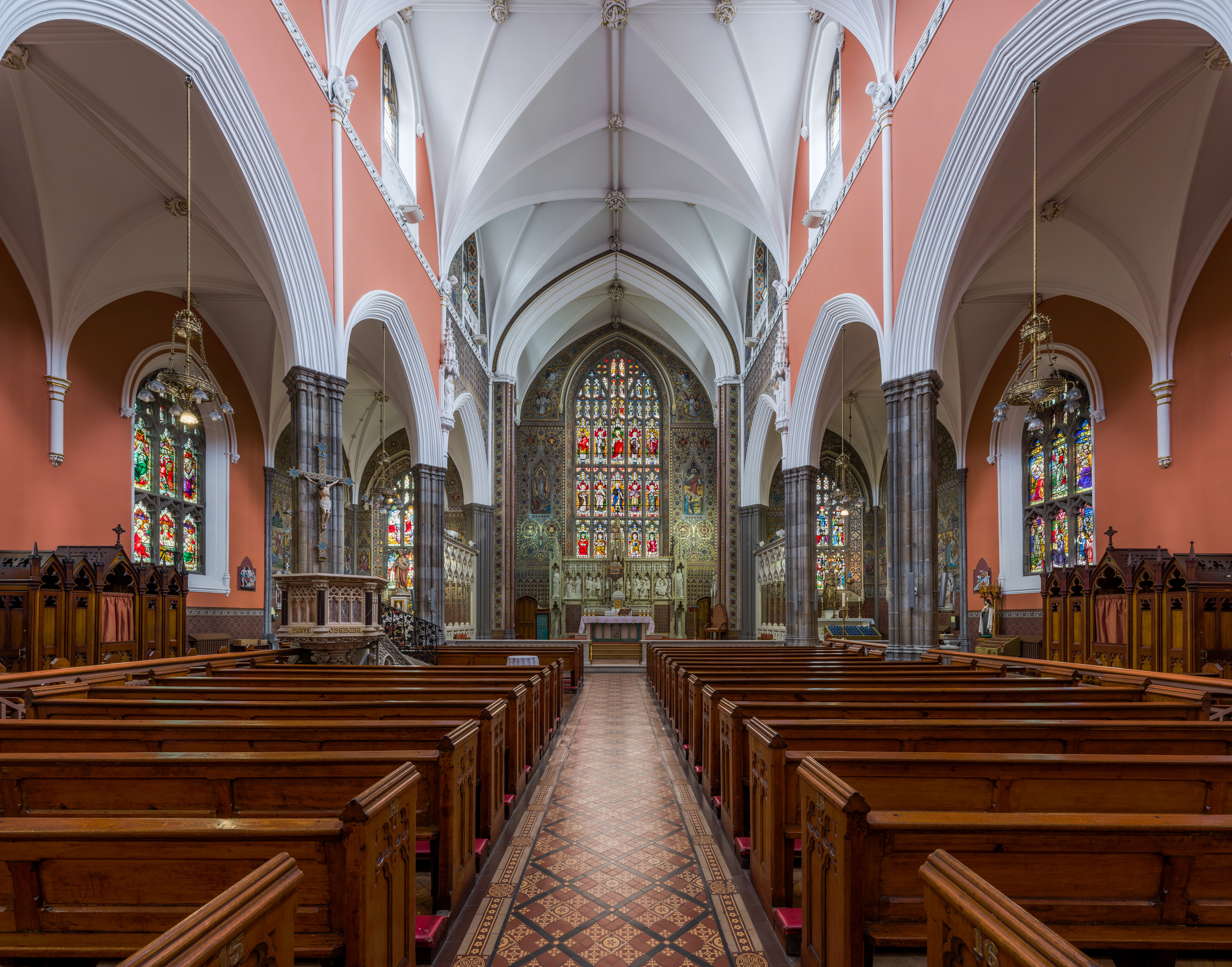
The altar of St. Patrick's Church, Dundalk is attributed to Farrell

Joseph Farrell was born in Dublin in 1823, the second of six sons of Terence Farrell, sculptor, and his wife, Maria Farrell (née Ruxton). Along with his brother, James, Farrell studied under his father. Farrell collaborated with his brothers as part of Farrell & Sons primarily on church commissions, but also created his own figures and "fancy groups".

Farrell's The Blessed Virgin commissioned by Mr Nugent Skelly, raised his profile among the Catholic clergy. It also a considerable source of income through plaster copies until it was copied and sold by Italian moulders in Dublin. Among his religious commissions are works for Cathedral of the Most Holy Trinity, Waterford, St. Patrick's Church, Dundalk, Rathgar Church, and the Convent of the Redemptorists at Drumcondra. His A Bard was shown at Dublin Exhibition 1853, and at the 1872 Dublin Exhibition he exhibited Looking at the Sea and Saved from the Wreck. Between 1839 and 1896, Farrell exhibited with the Royal Hibernian Academy.

Farrell died in 1904, and is buried in Glasnevin Cemetery.
