= James Farrell (sculptor) =

Irish sculptor

- Born: 1821; Dublin, Ireland
- Died: 20 November 1891 (aged 69–70); Mountjoy Square, Dublin, Ireland
- Known for: Sculpture
- Relatives: Terence Farrell (father), Thomas Farrell (brother), John Farrell (brother), Joseph Farrell (brother)
- Elected: Royal Hibernian Academy (1893)

James Farrell (1821—20 November 1891), was an Irish sculptor.

== Life ==
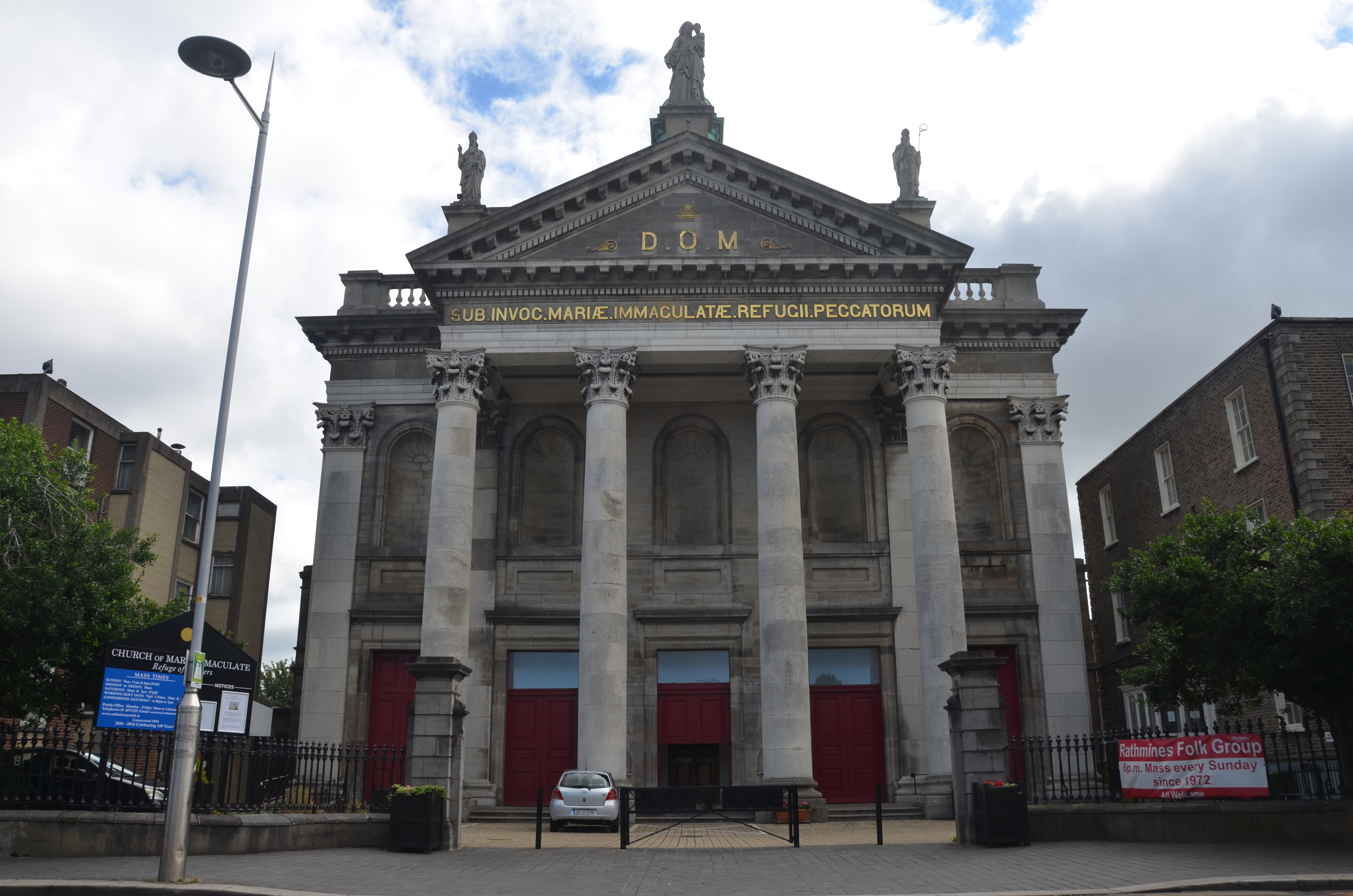
Church of Mary Immaculate Rathmines, with Our Lady of Refuge above the pediment

James Farrell was born in Dublin in 1821, the eldest of six sons of Terence Farrell, sculptor, and his wife, Maria Farrell (née Ruxton). He trained as a sculptor under his father. Farrell first exhibited with the Royal Hibernian Academy (RHA) in 1836 with two busts. He occasionally collaborated with his father, including on the bust of the Dean of St Patrick's Cathedral, jointly exhibited in 1842.

His first notable work was The Pet Dove's Return, exhibited at the Royal Irish Art Union in 1845 for which he was awarded the first premium of £15. Later rendered in marble and exhibited in 1847 at the Royal Academy, and in 1848 at the RHA. Along with Hunter Reposing (1852) both works were exhibited at the Dublin Exhibition of 1853. His Our Lady of Refuge was purchased by Rev. Matthew Collier and installed in the Mary Immaculate, Refuge of Sinners Church, Rathmines above the pediment. The National Museum of Ireland held a cast of his Calypso.

A large proportion of his commissions were religious statues, altars and monuments such as Annunciation in Saint Francis Xavier Church, Gardiner Street, Christ in the Temple in Rathmines Church, and The Sacred Heart in Sion Hill Convent, Blackrock. On 17 April 1880, he was elected an associate of the RHA, and on 18 November 1882, a member.

Farrell died on 20 November 1891 at his home, 30 Mountjoy Square. He is buried in the vaults of St Andrew's Church, Westland Row. The president and 9 members of the RHA attended his funeral.
