= John Gallagher (sculptor) =

Irish sculptor

- Born: c. 1805
- Died: 1873 (aged 67–68); England
- Education: Royal Dublin Society
- Known for: Sculpture

John Gallagher (c. 1805—1873), was an Irish sculptor.

== Life ==
John Gallagher was born around 1805. He enrolled in the Royal Dublin Society (RDS) schools, winning numerous prizes. Due to his talent, he and his fellow pupil, Constantine Panormo were sent to London to study under William Behnes for 2 years paid for by the school in 1824. Whilst in London, both students also attended the Royal Academy. Behnes declared Gallagher and Panormo to be "these two geniuses of Dublin." He later spent time in Rome with Panormo, also funded by the RDS. In 1915, it was recorded that early works from both artists were still held in the collections of the RDS.

In 1832, Gallagher exhibited with the Royal Academy for the first time, and exhibited semi-regularly until 1844. Walter G. Strickland notes that his career did not live up to the "expectations of his early youth, and little is known of his career." He was unsuccessful in his application to become master of the RDS's Modelling School in 1840. Stickland records that he is in London in 1845, and there is no further information on his career.

He died in 1873.

== Selected works ==
- Bust of Colonel Hodges (1834)
- Bas-relief of Count Ugolino and his sons in prison (1837)
- Baron De Lagos (1837), a marble bust
- Prometheus chained to the Rock formerly in the RDS's House on Kildare Street
- Flora attributed to Gallagher, in the collections of the RDS
