= Constantine Panormo =

Irish sculptor

- Born: c. 1805; London, England
- Died: May 15, 1852 (aged 46–47); Queen's Square, Dublin, Ireland
- Education: Royal Dublin Society
- Known for: Sculpture
- Elected: Royal Hibernian Academy (1842)

Constantine Panormo (c. 1805—15 May 1852), was an Irish sculptor.

== Life ==
Constantine Panormo was born around 1805 in London. His father, Francis Panormo, was a professor of music who lived at number 8 Grafton Street, Dublin. Panormo entered the Royal Dublin Society's Schools and won many prizes as a student. In 1826, Panormo and fellow student, John Gallagher, were sent to London to study under William Behnes for 2 years paid for by the School. He later spent time in Rome, also funded by the School. While in London, he was awarded a medal from the Society of Arts, and exhibited with the Royal Academy in 1833 and 1834.

In 1837, Panormo returned to Dublin, and in June 1840 he succeeded John Smyth as the Master of the Society's School of Modelling. He exhibited from 1837 with the Royal Hibernian Academy until 1849, having been elected an Associate in May 1842. As Master he taught numerous notable sculptors of the time including Thomas Farrell and William James O'Doherty.

Following his return to Dublin, he lived on Grattan Street, Lower Mount Street, and later Ormond Quay before moving to 11 Queen's Square in 1845. He died in his home on Queen's Square on 15 May 1852. His business at Queen's Square was described "Stone, Statuary and Marble Yards" in 1851.

A medal won by Panormo from the Royal Dublin Society in 1823 is now held in the British Museum.

== Selected works ==
- Bust of Thalia (1827), Royal Dublin Society
- Theseus rescuing Hippodamia from the Centaur, Royal Dublin Society
- Caractacus, a group, Royal Dublin Society
- Mercury, statue, plaster, National Museum of Ireland
- David throwing the Sling at Goliath (1843)
- Sir Edward Stanley, bust (1842), National Gallery of Ireland
