= John Farrell (sculptor) =

Irish sculptor

- Born: 1829; Dublin, Ireland
- Died: 1901 (aged 71–72); Dublin
- Known for: Sculpture
- Relatives: Terence Farrell (father), James Farrell (brother), Thomas Farrell (brother), Joseph Farrell (brother)

John Farrell (1829—1901) was an Irish sculptor.

== Life ==
John Farrell was born in Dublin in 1829, the fourth of six sons of Terence Farrell, sculptor, and his wife, Maria Farrell (née Ruxton). Farrell enrolled at the Royal Dublin Society Modelling School, winning a prize for a large model in 1846. He also attended drawing classes at the Royal Hibernian Academy (RHA).

Farrell worked with her brothers as a sculptor, primarily working on statues and other carved items for churches. He exhibited occasionally with the RHA between 1849 and 1894. His work was also exhibited in London in 1843, 1847, and 1855. Aside from the work with his brothers, Farrell also created several "fancy groups" such as The Wanderer exhibited at the Dublin Exhibition 1853, Soft Sleep of Happy Boyhood in marble which was shown at the RHA and the 1865 Dublin Exhibition. In the 1872 Dublin Exhibition he exhibited a number of works, including Judith, which was later owned by Lord Ardilaun. He executed a portrait bust of Reverend Dr Yore, which in 1913 was held in the Convent of the Sisters of Charity, Merrion. The family, trading as Farrell & Sons lived and worked from Gloucester Street for many years.

Farrell died in 1901, and is buried in Glasnevin Cemetery.

The Royal College of Surgeons in Ireland hold a bust of John Hatch Power (c. 1865) by Farrell.
