= William James O'Doherty =

Irish sculptor

- Born: 1835; Dublin, Ireland
- Died: February 1868 (aged 32–33)
- Education: Royal Dublin Society
- Known for: Sculpture

William James O'Doherty (1835—February 1868), was an Irish sculptor.

== Life ==
William James O'Doherty was born in Dublin in 1835. There are no records relating to his parents. He entered the Royal Dublin Society's School in 1848, studying painting until Constantine Panormo encouraged him to take up modelling. O'Doherty studied under Joseph Robinson Kirk after Panormo's death in 1852. He won numerous prizes such as a bronze medal at the Great Industrial Exhibition in Dublin in 1853 for two models: Night, (after Bertel Thorwaldsen), and Boy and bird.

O'Doherty moved to London under the advice of sculptor, John Edward Jones, in 1854. He exhibited a number of pieces in 1857 with the Royal Academy. Gondoline, inspired by a poem by Henry Kirke White, was commissioned in marble by a banker, R. C. L. Bevan. The model Erin shown at the 1860 Royal Academy Exhibition, was rendered in marble for the marquess of Downshire, who went on to become a friend and patron of O'Doherty. Some of his earlier works were exhibited under the names of "Doherty" and "Dogherty".

His later exhibited works were primarily busts including of Viscountess Guillamore and Sir Robert Bateson. He travelled in Rome in 1864 to study and finish a work called The martyr for the marquess of Downshire. Nothing is known about his remaining years until his death is recorded in the hospital of La Charité in Berlin in February 1868. The Art Journal for 1868 stated: "Had he lived, till practice had matured his judgement and time had toned down his lofty aspirations, for he soared higher than perhaps his talents legitimately would entitle him, there is little doubt but that his name would have been enrolled among those many artists of renown to whom Ireland has given birth."
