= Thomas Farrell (sculptor) =

Irish sculptor

Sir Thomas Farrell
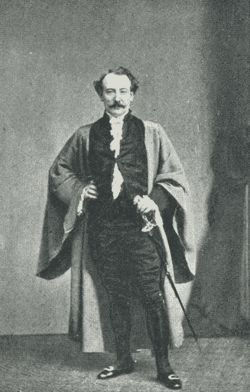
- Born: c. 1827; Summerhill, Dublin, Ireland
- Died: July 2, 1900 (aged 72–73); Stillorgan, Dublin, Ireland
- Education: Royal Dublin Society
- Known for: Sculpture
- Style: Neoclassical
- Relatives: Terence Farrell (father), James Farrell (brother), Joseph Farrell (brother), John Farrell (brother)
- Elected: Royal Hibernian Academy (1893)

Sir Thomas Farrell (c. 1827—2 July 1900), was an Irish sculptor known for his works in early Neoclassicism and realism.

== Life and family ==
He was born in Lower Mecklenburgh Street (later called Railway Street) in Summerhill, Dublin, one of six sons of Terence Farrell, sculptor, and his wife, Maria Farrell (née Ruxton). He trained as a sculptor in his father's workshops. In 1842 he entered the modelling school of the Royal Dublin Society, studying under Constantine Panormo, and became acquainted with the neoclassical school of John Flaxman and John Hogan. In 1844 and 1846, he was awarded premiums by the Royal Irish Art Union.

All of Farrell's five brothers all became sculptors. His older brothers, James and Joseph also trained with their father. His younger brothers were, John, who trained at the modelling school of the Royal Dublin Society, Michael (1834–55) and William (born 1839). Their mother died shortly after the birth of William in 1839.

Farrell died at his residence, Redesdale House, in Stillorgan, County Dublin, a home he shared with his three surviving brothers and widowed sister, Maria Jones. He is buried in Glasnevin Cemetery.

== Career ==
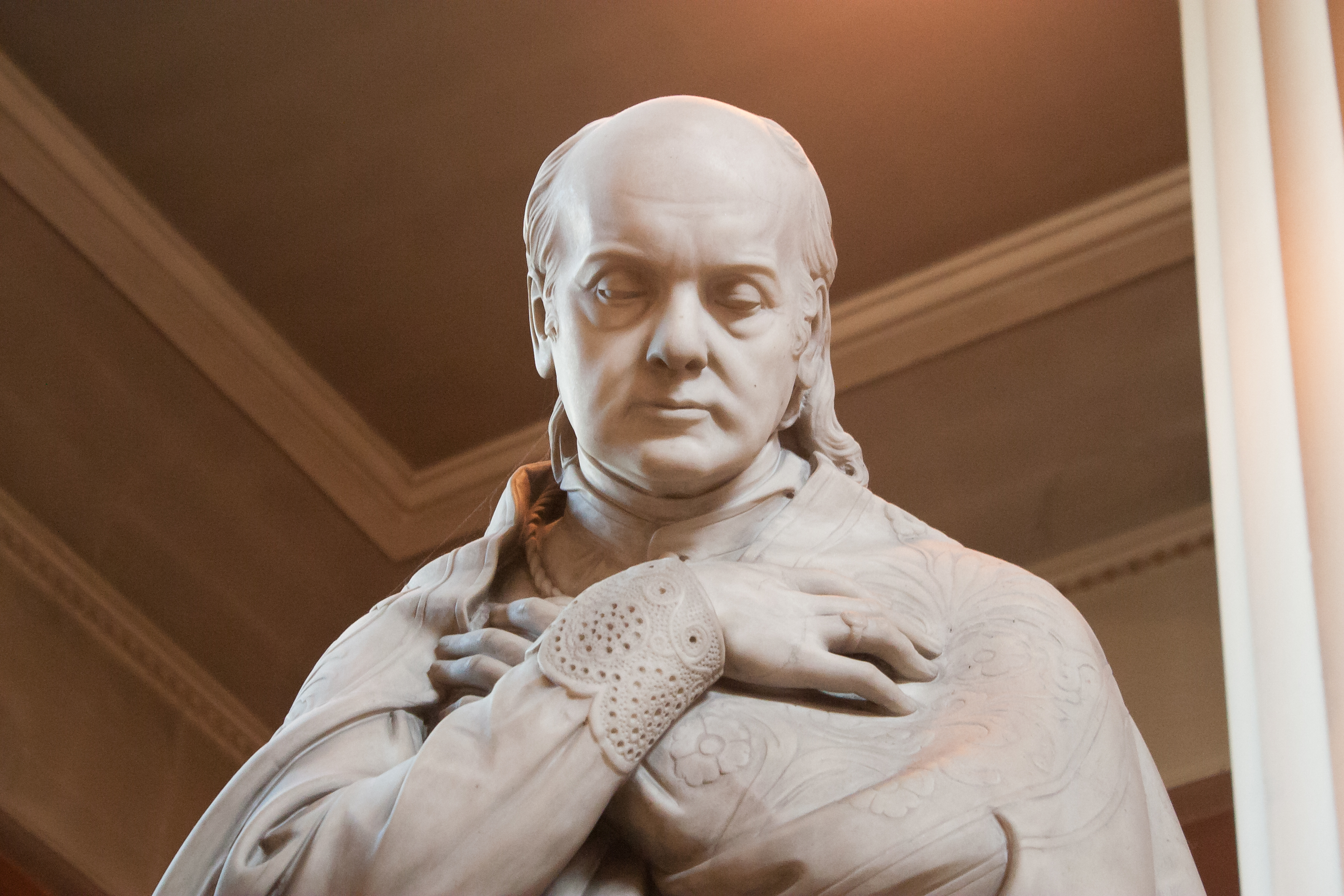
Daniel Murray by Farrell (detail)

Farrell's first commission was a monument to Archbishop Daniel Murray in the Pro-Cathedral in the 1850s, winning against submissions from Hogan, Christopher Moore, and Joseph Robinson Kirk. He travelled to Italy to study with sculptors including Antonio Canova in preparation for this commission.

One of the first works that made him prominent was the bas-relief representing the last charge at Waterloo, designed for the Wellington Monument in the Phoenix Park. His work was accepted after public competition. Another of his early works was his memorial to Captain John McNeil Boyd in St. Patrick's Cathedral. He entered the competition for the monument to Daniel O'Connell in 1864, but the commission was awarded to John Foley.

His statue of William Smith O'Brien, the Young Ireland leader, formerly at the head of D'Olier Street, is now in O'Connell Street, as is another statue by him, that of Sir John Gray, the surgeon and politician who was instrumental in giving Dublin its water supply. He is acknowledged as the leading sculptor based in Ireland melding early neoclassicism with the taste for realism at the time. His brothers, John, Joseph and William often assisted him in his marble works.

In 1893, Farrell was elected President of the Royal Hibernian Academy, the first sculptor to hold that position, and having been a full member since 1860. He exhibited regularly until his death. He was knighted in May 1894.
