= John Smyth (sculptor) =

Irish sculptor (1776–1840)

- Born: 1776; Dublin, Ireland
- Died: March 1840 (aged 63–64); Dublin
- Other name: John Smith

John Smyth (1776–1840) was an Irish sculptor.

== Early life and family ==
The son of sculptor Edward Smyth (1749–1812), John Smyth was born in Dublin. There is no surviving record of his mother. He was likely trained at the Dublin Society's school, and worked with his father at 36 Montgomery Street (now Foley Street) in Dublin.

== Career ==
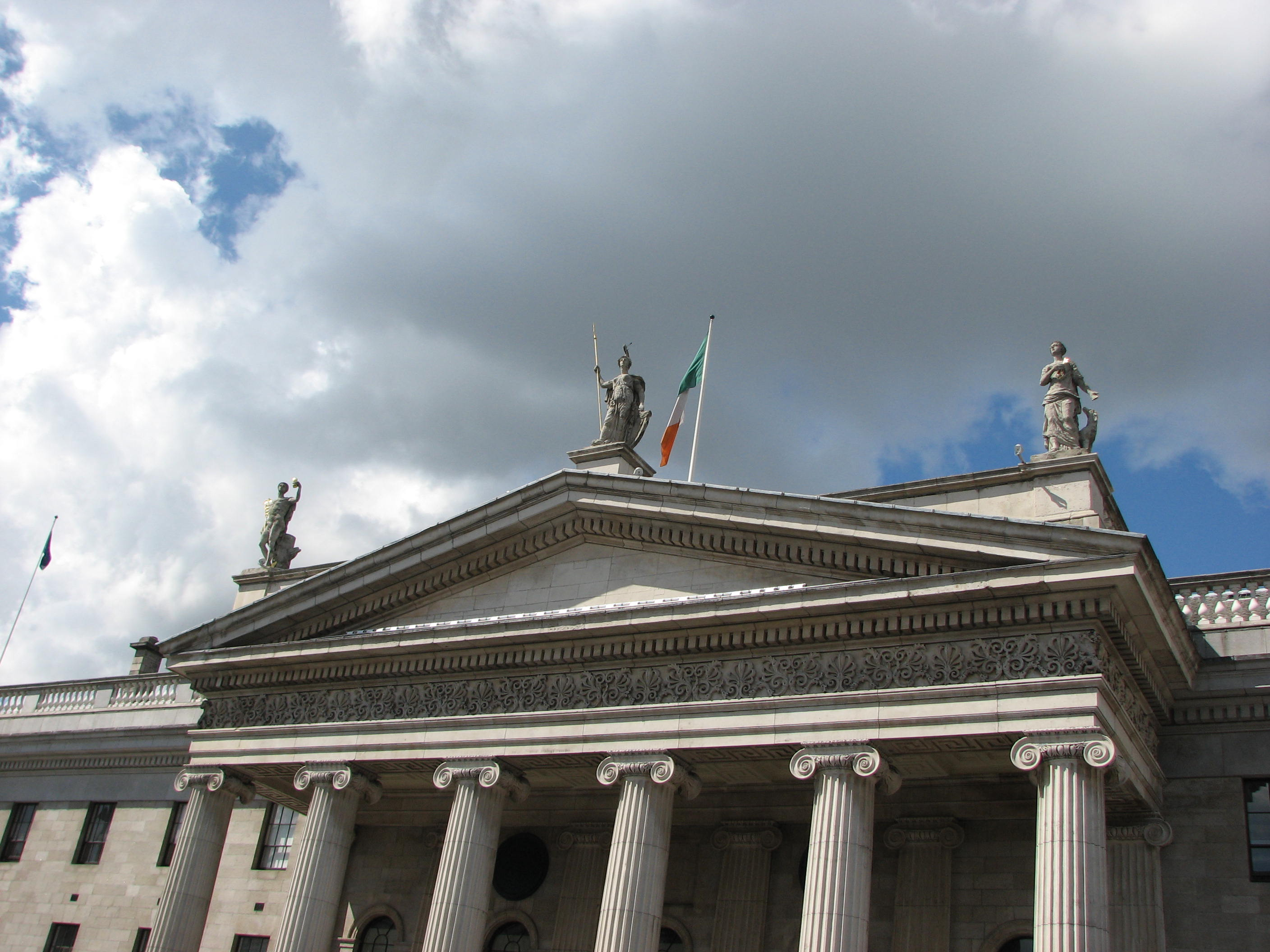
Smyth's studies of Hibernia, Mercury and Fidelity on the pediment of Dublin's GPO

One of his first public works was a monument to John Ball in St Patrick's Cathedral, Dublin.

He assisted his father, Edward, with a number of sculptures at Parliament House (now Bank of Ireland), the King's Inns, and with decorative plaster and stonework at the Chapel Royal of Dublin Castle. He also sculpted the statues of Mercury, Fidelity, and Hibernia for the pediment of the General Post Office, Dublin (c.1814). From 1815, Smyth focused on portrait busts and funerary monuments, including those to John Boardman (c. 1814), and George Ogle (1815).

In 1813, he succeeded his father as the master of the school of modelling and sculpture at the Dublin Society, taking the role very seriously and greatly improving the reputation of the school. Amongst this students were John Henry Foley and Terence Farrell.

Other pieces by Smyth were sculpted for Dublin's Richmond Bridge (c.1816; now O'Donovan Rossa Bridge), and several public buildings and churches in the capital. In 1818, Smyth was commissioned to produce a bust of Charles Whitworth, 1st Earl Whitworth, then Lord Lieutenant of Ireland, which was displayed at the Society of Artists in 1819 alongside a bust of his wife Arabella by Thomas Kirk. He repaired the equestrian statue of William III (William of Orange) in College Green after it was blown up in 1836.

He exhibited with the Society of Artists of Ireland, the Society of Artists of the City of Dublin, the Hibernian Society of Artists, and with the Artists of Ireland. He was a founding associate of the Royal Hibernian Academy of Arts in 1824, and exhibited there.

== Death and legacy ==
Smyth died in March 1840, and was likely buried with his father in St Thomas's church graveyard, Dublin. With his wife, Mary, he had a large family. Two of his sons became sculptors, William or John (born circa 1804) and George (born circa 1818). John was not as successful and failed to be appointed master of the school of modelling after his father's death. A number of his grandchildren also became sculptors.

A number of his works are held by the National Gallery of Ireland.
