= Francesco Sacrati (cardinal) =

Roman Catholic prelate

Most Reverend Francesco Sacrati
- Cardinal-Priest of San Matteo in Merulana; Archbishop (Personal Title) of Cesena
- Church: Catholic Church
- In office: 1621–1623
- Predecessor: Francesco Sforza
- Successor: Francesco Maria Mancini
- Previous post: Titular Archbishop of Damascus (1612–1622)

Orders
- Consecration: November 5, 1612 by Scipione Caffarelli-Borghese
- Created cardinal: May 17, 1621
- Rank: Cardinal-Priest

Personal details
- Born: 1567 Ferrara, Italy
- Died: September 6, 1623 (aged 55–56) Cesena, Italy (age 56)

Francesco Sacrati (1567 – September 6, 1623) was a Roman Catholic prelate who served as Archbishop (Personal Title) of Cesena (1622–1623), Cardinal-Priest of San Matteo in Merulana (1621–1623), and Titular Archbishop of Damascus (1612–1622).

== Biography ==
Francesco Sacrati was born to nobility in Ferrara, Italy in 1567, the son of Camilla and Marquis Tommaso Sacrati. He is the nephew of Ercole Sacrati, Bishop of Comacchio and brother of Alfonso Sacrati, also Bishop of Comacchio. He received his doctorate in utroque iure in both canon and civil law from the University of Bologna. In 1595, he was named Referendary of the Tribunals of the Apostolic Signature of Justice and of Grace. On October 5, 1596, he was appointed Governor of Fano. He was successively appointed as Auditor of the Sacred Palace and on June 25, 1599, the Auditor of the Sacred Roman Rota in which he traveled with Cardinal Pietro Aldobrandini to Florence to welcome Queen Marie de' Medici, the wife of King Henri IV of France.

On November 5, 1612, he was elected during the papacy Pope Paul V of as Titular Archbishop of Damascus. On November 5, 1612, he was consecrated bishop in the Sistine Chapel by Scipione Caffarelli-Borghese, Archpriest of the Arcibasilica di San Giovanni in Laterano, with Fabio Biondi, Titular Latin Patriarch of Jerusalem, and Ulpiano Volpi, Archbishop of Chieti, serving as co-consecrators. On February 12, 1621, he was named Prefect of the Apostolic Datary.

He was created Cardinal Priest in the consistory of April 19, 1621, during the papacy of Pope Gregory XV and received the red hat and title of San Matteo in Merulana on May 17, 1621. In July 1621, he was named Commander of the Sovereign Military Order of Malta and on March 22, 1622, Commendatory Abbot of San Giovanni di Castagneto (Reggio di Calabria). On May 23, 1622, he was named by Pope Gregory XV as Archbishop (personal title) of Cesena. He participated in the Conclave of 1623 which elected Pope Urban VIII. He died on September 6, 1623, and is buried in the church of San Maria dell'Anima in Rome.

== Episcopal succession ==
Episcopal succession of Francesco Sacrati

While bishop, he was the principal consecrator of:

- Francesco Cavaliere, Bishop of Valva e Sulmona (1621);
- Fabrizio Carafa, Bishop of Bitonto (1622);
- Sebastiano De Paoli, Titular Bishop of Neocaesarea in Bithynia and Coadjutor Bishop of Nepi e Sutri (1622);
- Girolamo Tantucci, Bishop of Grosseto (1622);
- Joannes Mattaeus Caryophyllis, Titular Archbishop of Iconium (1622);

and the principal co-consecrator of:

- Alessandro Del Monte, Bishop of Gubbio (1616);
- Girolamo Ricciulli, Bishop of Belcastro (1616);
- Lelio Veterano, Bishop of Fondi (1616);
- Vincenzo Agnello Suardi, Bishop of Alba (1616);
- Alfonso Sacrati, Bishop of Comacchio (1617);
- Fabrizio Landriani, Bishop of Pavia (1617);
- Alessandro Scappi, Bishop of Satriano e Campagna (1618);
- Ippolito Borghese (bishop), Bishop of Montalcino (1618);
- García Gil Manrique, Titular Bishop of Utica and Auxiliary Bishop of Cuenca (1618);
- Giulio Monterenzi, Bishop of Faenza (1618);
- Filippo Salviati (bishop), Bishop of Sansepolcro (1619);
- Alfonso Giglioli (Zilioli), Bishop of Anglona-Tursi (1619);
- Ferdinando Millini, Bishop of Imola (1619);
- Giovanni Battista Stella, Bishop of Bitonto (1619);
- Giuliano de' Medici (archbishop), Archbishop of Pisa (1620); and
- Guillaume Du Nozet, Titular Archbishop of Seleucia in Isauria (1621).

Catholic Church titles
Preceded by Decio Carafa	Titular Archbishop of Damascus; 1612–1622	Succeeded by Agostino Morosini
Preceded by Francesco Sforza	Cardinal-Priest of San Matteo in Merulana; 1621–1623	Succeeded by Francesco Maria Mancini
Preceded by Michelangelo Tonti	Archbishop (Personal Title) of Cesena; 1622–1623	Succeeded by Lorenzo Campeggi
