= Fabrizio Carafa =

Roman Catholic bishop

Most Reverend Fabrizio Carafa
- Church: Catholic Church
- Diocese: Diocese of Bitonto
- In office: 1622–1651
- Predecessor: Giovanni Battista Stella
- Successor: Alessandro Crescenzi (cardinal)

Orders
- Consecration: 6 February 1622 by Francesco Sacrati (cardinal)

Personal details
- Born: 1588 Naples, Italy
- Died: March 1651 (age 63) Bitonto, Italy

Fabrizio Carafa (1588 – March, 1651) was a Roman Catholic prelate who served as Bishop of Bitonto (1622–1651).

== Biography ==
Fabrizio Carafa was born in Naples, Italy in 1588. On 24 January 1622, he was appointed during the papacy of Pope Gregory XV as Bishop of Bitonto. On 6 February 1622, he was consecrated bishop by Francesco Sacrati (cardinal), Cardinal-Priest of San Matteo in Merulana, with Alfonso Giglioli, Bishop of Anglona-Tursi, and Carlo Bovi, Bishop of Bagnoregio, serving as co-consecrators. He served as Bishop of Bitonto until his death in March 1651.

== See also ==
- Catholic Church in Italy

== External links and additional sources ==
- Cheney, David M. "Diocese of Bitonto". Catholic-Hierarchy.org. (for Chronology of Bishops)
- Chow, Gabriel. "Diocese of Bitonto (Italy)". GCatholic.org. (for Chronology of Bishops)

Catholic Church titles
Preceded by Giovanni Battista Stella	Bishop of Bitonto; 1622–1651	Succeeded by Alessandro Crescenzi (cardinal)
