= Charles de Hémard de Denonville =

French bishop and cardinal (1493–1540)

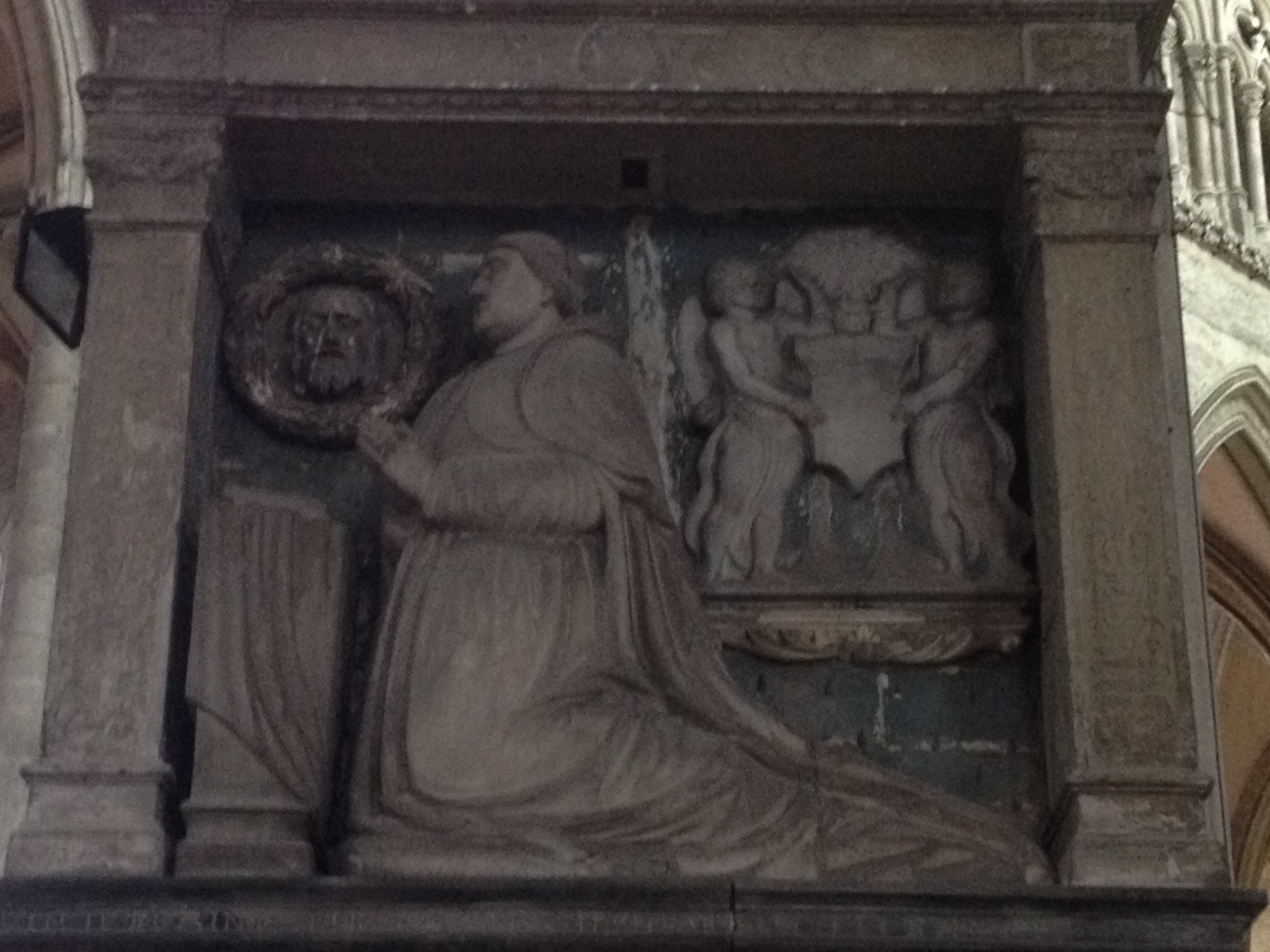
Detail of monument to Charles de Hémard de Denonville in Amiens Cathedral

Charles de Hémard de Denonville (1493–1540) was a French Roman Catholic bishop and cardinal.

== Biography ==
Charles de Hémard de Denonville was born in Denonville in 1493, the son of Pierre Hémard, seigneur de Denonville, and Jeanne Frémiere. He was educated at the Collège de Le Mans in Paris, becoming a doctor of both laws.

After completing his education, he became a secretary of Cardinal Philippe de Luxembourg. In 1515, he obtained the benefice of Notre-Dame de Sanchez, Cahors, and in 1517, the benefice of Dangeau. Also in 1517, he became a canon of the cathedral chapter of Tours Cathedral.

He was ordained as a priest on Easter Sunday, 1518. Following the death of Cardinal Philippe de Luxembourg in 1518, Hémard de Denonville became secretary of Cardinal Adrian Gouffier de Boissy; pastor of Saint-Gabriel de Vignoux, Bourges; and a canon of Coutances Cathedral, later its archdeacon. In 1520, he became a protonotary apostolic; in 1521, prior of Saint-Pierre de Aubiers Abbey in Luçon; in 1522, pastor of Saint-Firmin de Asnières; and in 1523, prior of Saint-Jean des Grèves.

He became a royal chaplain to Francis I of France in January 1526. In 1528, he became a member of the Conseil du Roi. He also became president of the Royal Ecclesiastical Department. He also became a datary attached to the legation to the Kingdom of France, continuing to hold this post even after promotion to the episcopate.

On 23 January 1531 he was elected bishop of Mâcon. In November 1533, he became France's ambassador to the pope in Rome, and he occupied that post from May 1534 to May 1538. In 1535, he became abbot of Saint-Aubin de Angers.

At the request of Francis I of France, Pope Paul III created him a cardinal priest in the consistory of 22 December 1536. He received the red hat the next day and the titular church of San Matteo in Via Merulana on 15 January 1537.

On 9 December 1538 he was named administrator of the see of Amiens.

He traveled to Le Mans with Cardinal Jean du Bellay and there fell ill on 17 August 1540; he died in Le Mans on 23 August 1540. He received heart burial: his heart was buried in Le Mans Cathedral and his body was buried in Amiens Cathedral.
