= Ottavio Orsini =

17th-century Roman Catholic bishop

Most Reverend Ottavio Orsini
- Church: Catholic Church
- In office: 1632–1640
- Predecessor: Ludovico degli Atti
- Successor: Francesco Romolo Mileti
- Previous post: Bishop of Venafro (1621–1632)

Orders
- Ordination: 1618
- Consecration: 21 Sep 1621 by Roberto Ubaldini

Personal details
- Born: 1585
- Died: 1640 (age 55)

Ottavio Orsini (1585–1640) was a Roman Catholic prelate who served as Bishop of Segni (1632–1640) and Bishop of Venafro (1621–1632).

== Biography ==
Ottavio Orsini was born in 1585 and ordained a priest in 1618. On 13 Sep 1621, he was appointed during the papacy of Pope Gregory XV as Bishop of Venafro. On 21 Sep 1621, he was consecrated bishop by Roberto Ubaldini, Bishop of Montepulciano, with Pietro Antonio Da Ponte, Bishop of Troia, and Fabrizio Landriani, Bishop of Pavia, serving as co-consecrators. On 20 Sep 1632, he was appointed during the papacy of Pope Urban VIII as Bishop of Segni. He served as Bishop of Segni until his death in 1640.

While bishop, he was the principal co-consecrator of Felice Franceschini, Bishop of Andria (1632); Orazio Muscettola, Bishop of Trevico (1636); and Maurizio Ragano, Bishop of Fondi (1636).

== External links and additional sources ==
- Cheney, David M. "Diocese of Venafro". Catholic-Hierarchy.org. (for Chronology of Bishops) ^{[self-published]}
- Chow, Gabriel. "Diocese of Venafro (Italy)". GCatholic.org. (for Chronology of Bishops) ^{[self-published]}

Catholic Church titles
Preceded by Ladislao d'Aquino	Bishop of Venafro; 1621–1632	Succeeded by Vincenzo Martinelli (bishop)
Preceded by Ludovico degli Atti	Bishop of Segni; 1632–1640	Succeeded by Francesco Romolo Mileti
