= Giuliano de' Medici (disambiguation) =

Giuliano de' Medici (1453–1478) was the co-ruler of Florence.

Giuliano de' Medici may also refer to:

- Giuliano de' Medici, Duke of Nemours (1479–1516)
- Giuliano di Pierfrancesco de' Medici (1520–1588)
- Giuliano de' Medici (archbishop) (died 1635)
- Giuliano de' Medici (film), Italian movie from 1941
