= Arcis enclosure =

11th-century urban enclosure in Tours, France

- Enceinte des Arcis
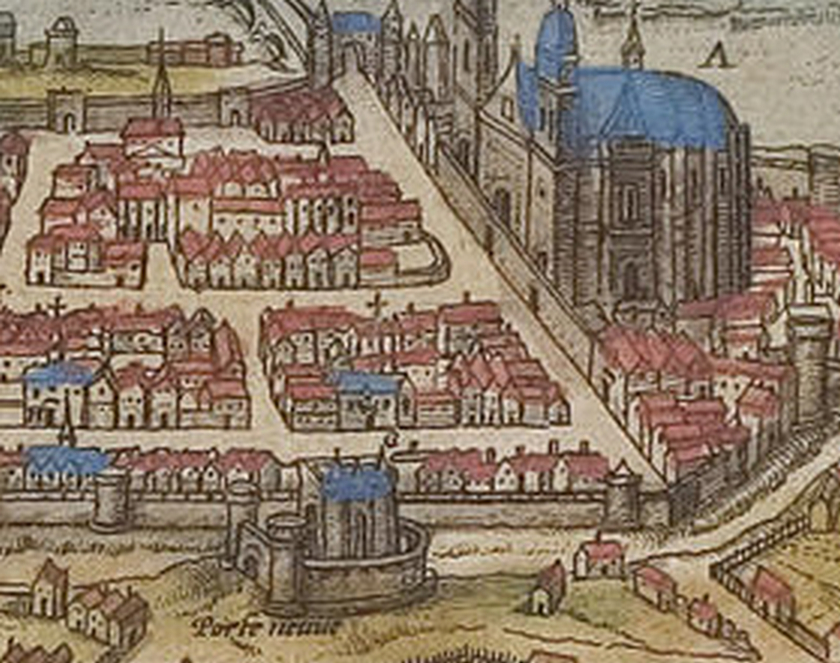
- Below, the medieval Saint-Vincent gate at the southwest corner of the Arcis wall (from an engraving by Georg Braun and Frans Hogenberg, 1572).
- Interactive map of Arcis enclosure
- Location: France; Centre-Val de Loire Region; Indre-et-Loire department Historical region of Touraine
- Coordinates: 47°23′46″N 0°41′32″E
- Beginning date: 11th or 12th century
- Initial and current building purpose: It was initially a fortress and it is currently a disappeared monument

The Arcis enclosure (French: Enceinte des Arcis) is an urban enclosure in the French commune of Tours in the Indre-et-Loire department.

It was built against the western flank of the city's Gallo-Roman enclosure to extend the walled perimeter. Its construction undoubtedly dates back to the 11th or 12th century, after the building of the bridge over the Loire that ends in its northeast corner, but sources on its subject are scarce. Its purpose was certainly defensive, but it also played a political role in the war of influence between the old city of Tours and the rapidly expanding town of Châteauneuf, one kilometer to the west. It was intended to testify to the prosperity of a growing city, whose authority and prestige weighed heavily on its rival.

In the 14th century, it was replaced by a new rampart protecting a much larger area, including the two urban cores. The district was bombed in June 1944, leaving almost no attested remains.

== History ==
The term "Arcis", formed from the Latin verb ardere, generally indicates a place cleared by slash-and-burn. In the present case, however, this etymology is not certain, and the word may also symbolize the "urban reconquest" of a territory inhabited in Gallo-Roman times but abandoned in the Late Middle Ages.

The village of Arcis, to the west of the Gallo-Roman enclosure (cité de Tours), may have been founded on ancient roads running parallel to the Loire (today's rue de la Scellerie and rue Colbert), whose use was increased by the construction, from the 1030s onwards, of Eudes' bridge over the Loire, which ended at the northeast corner of the village. Craftsmen and merchants settled here. It probably began to develop before being fortified. By the 11th century, it had become a highly fragmented area, with a high proportion of roads and unbuilt land lots (some of which was still wet or marshy).

OpenStreetMap The medieval walls of Tours. Gallo-Roman enclosure (4th century) Arcis enclosure (11th-12th centuries) Clouaison de Jean le bon (14th century)

The enclosure, for its part, probably dates from the 11th or 12th century, depending on the author, but no more precise dating can be proposed. Some historians refer to the 11th century, others to the reign of Henry II Plantagenet.

When the medieval enclosure was built in the 14th century, the western side of the Arcis wall, which was of no use since the new wall was built on its north-west and south-west corners, was abandoned or used as a base for other constructions; moreover, poorly maintained because its status and owners were unclear, it was already in poor condition. This is particularly true of the north-west corner. The north and south flanks, more or less repaired or rebuilt, were integrated into the new enclosure.

== Function ==
OpenStreetMap Tours circa 900. (Note: The geographical limits of the urbanized area of Châteauneuf and its suburbium are imprecise to within several tens of metres: Noizet, Hélène (2007). La fabrique de la ville: espaces et sociétés à Tours (IX-XIII siècles). Publications de la Sorbonne. p. 106. ISBN 978-2-8594-4572-0.)

The Arcis wall was built to protect the area to the west of the Gallo-Roman enclosure, which also included the Hôtel-Dieu and Saint-Maurice church, whose vulnerable façade spanned the ancient wall. It also secured access to the bridge, as no other permanent crossing of the Loire existed several kilometers upstream or downstream.

While the Arcis wall was built for military reasons, it also had political and religious implications. At that time, Tours was an urbanized area with two very distinct entities, one of which was a growing nucleus around the Basilica of Saint-Martin to the west, protected in the first quarter of the 10th century by the Châteauneuf enclosure, but which it had largely overtaken. It was important for the city councillors (the Counts of Touraine, the Cathedral Chapter and the Archbishop) to show that their city was also growing, and that it too was protected. By appropriating these newly urbanized districts, the city hoped to ostentatiously assert its supremacy and prestige over Châteauneuf, under the protection of the King of France.

== Location and remains ==
=== An uncertain route for a two-stage construction project ===
OpenStreetMap The Arcis enclosure. Gallo-Roman enclosure (4th century) Arcis enclosure (11th-12th centuries) Arcis enclosure ditch

The precise location of the enclosure is not known along its entire length, as texts are lacking and the remains have almost all disappeared. (Note: Many archives were lost in the fire at the Tours municipal library in June 1940, or were destroyed during the Wars of Religion, such as those of the Jacobins convent, some of whose grounds included part of the enclosure. La Caille (1981), p. 17 and Livernet (1982), p. 305.) It is generally accepted that the enclosure, connecting to the north-western corner tower of the Gallo-Roman enclosure, follows the Loire westwards along the rue de l'Hôpiteau, then descends southwards along the rue des Amandiers - the latter forming part of the enclosure's tour de ville, Its existence is attested to in 15th-century documents - (Note: La Caille (1985), p. 155) then into the block between rue de la Barre and rue du Cygne, before joining the south-west tower of the ancient enclosure along rue de la Scellerie to the south, giving it a surface area of just under 4 hectares. There are probably four gates in the enclosure, two to the north, one of which is at the mouth of the bridge, one to the west and one to the south (Porte Saint-Étienne), (Note: La Caille (1985), p. 148) but their precise number and location may have varied over time. The curtain wall was flanked by several towers, one of which, on rue du Cygne, was used as a prison in the 17th century. (Note: It was because of the presence of this prison that rue du Cygne was then named rue Malientras or Malyentras ("mal y entras", meaning "bad entry"): Gascuel, Geneviève (1999). CMD (ed.). À la découverte des noms des rues de Tours (in French). Montreuil-Bellay: . p. 88. ISBN 978-2-84477-024-0.) The western flank was lined by a moat (Note: La Caille (1985), p. 141) connected on one side to the Loire and on the other to the boire (backwater) to the south of the town, serving as much to drain the surrounding land as to protect the wall. The Rue du Cygne appears to run along the outside of this ditch, and its winding course can be explained by the need to bypass the overhanging wall to the south. (Note: La Caille (1985), pp. 152–153)

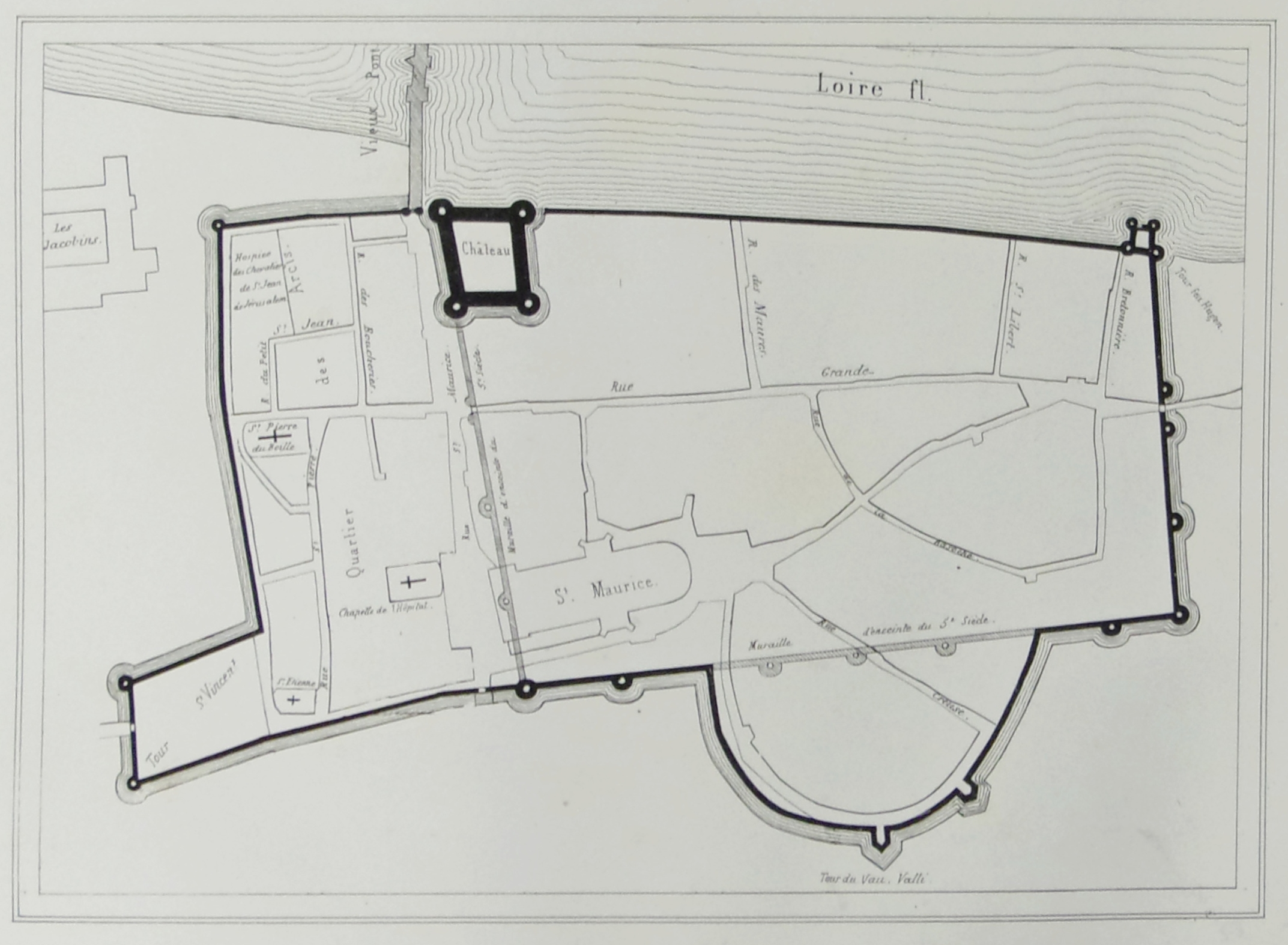
Tours in the 12th century (Champoiseau, 1841).

The actual structure of the enclosure (core and facing), the components of the curtain wall (stone masonry and mortar or bonding earth), its height, the presence of crenellations or a parapet walk - even if these elements seem probable - and the number and location of the towers remain unknown, as there are no remains or bibliographical elements to allow us to formulate hypotheses.

The south-western corner of the Arcis enclosure seems to form an overhang, built at a later date, which can be identified on the Napoleonic cadastre by the different orientation of certain plots, and already represented in 1841 on a plan by Noël Champoiseau. The thinness of its walls probably indicates a function other than defensive, but this cannot be specified. In any case, the land in question must have had a special status to be included, even symbolically, in the defended perimeter. (Note: La Caille (1985), p. 144) The overhang also appears to have been placed against the original curtain wall of the enclosure, as it intersects its moat. The ditch is still in use, however, and runs under the wall of the outcrop, which it crosses through a system of gates or harrows: the north wall of this outcrop is referred to in some deeds as the "Râteau wall". (Note: La Caille (1985), pp. 136, 143)

=== Few or no elevated remains ===
In June 1944, Allied bombing raids destroyed a vast area to the north of rue Colbert, where the remains of the Dominican convent and perhaps the remains of the Arcis walls were located. The construction of a new school complex on the same site in 1957 erased all traces of the enclosure.

To the south of rue Colbert, a few vestiges of the south-western extension of the enclosure may have survived here and there, in the fences of private properties between rue du Cygne and rue de la Barre, or in the inner courtyards of rue de la Scellerie. On the other hand, a thick wall separating two properties to the east of rue du Cygne, originally attributed to the Arcis enclosure, is more likely to be part of the 14th-century enclosure. (Note: La Caille (1985), pp. 141–142) The rest of the wall has completely disappeared from the urban landscape, having been destroyed or absorbed by more recent constructions as early as the 18th century.

The western ditch has been filled in, but anomalies in some of the buildings occupying its site (difference in level in the bays, cracks) and a tree whose trunk has sunk into the ground bear witness to the successive settling of the backfill. (Note: La Caille (1985), pp. 143, 154)

== Bibliography ==
- Chevalier, Bernard (May 1985). Histoire de Tours (in French). Toulouse: Éditions Privat. ISBN 2-7089-8224-9.
- Galinié, Henri; Randoin, Bernard (1979). Les archives du sol à Tours: survie et avenir de l'archéologie de la ville (in French). Société archéologique de Touraine et Laboratoire d'archéologie urbaine de Tours.
- Galinié, Henri (2007). Tours antique et médiéval. Lieux de vie, temps de la ville. 40 ans d'archéologie urbaine (in French). Tours: FERACF. ISBN 978-2-913272-15-6.
- Livernet, Sylvain (1982). Tours du XVIII au IXX siècle. La conservation des éléments anciens dans une ville moderne (thèse de doctorat) (in French). Vol. I and II. Lille: Université de Lille.
- La Caille, Claire Mabire (1981). "Évolution des enclos conventuels des mendiants à Tours (XIII-XVIII siècles)". Recherches Sur Tours (in French) (1): 13–72.
- La Caille, Claire Mabire (1985). "Contribution à l'étude du rempart des Arcis à Tours". Bulletin de la Société archéologique de Touraine (in French). XLI: 135–157. ISSN 1153-2521.
- Ranjard, Robert (1986). La Touraine archéologique: guide du touriste en Indre-et-Loire (in French) (3 ed.). Mayenne: La Manutention. ISBN 9782855540177.
