= Simone Oliverio =

Most Reverend Simone Oliverio
- Bishop of Fondi
- Church: Catholic Church
- Diocese: Diocese of Fondi
- In office: 1662–1668
- Predecessor: Pietro Paolo Pinto
- Successor: Filippo Alferio Ossorio

Personal details
- Died: 1 November 1668 Fondi, Italy

Simone Oliverio (died 1 November 1668) was a Roman Catholic prelate who served as Bishop of Fondi (1662–1668).

== Biography ==
On 13 March 1662, Simone Oliverio was appointed during the papacy of Pope Alexander VII as Bishop of Fondi. He served as Bishop of Fondi until his death on 1 November 1668.

Catholic Church titles
Preceded by Pietro Paolo Pinto	Bishop of Fondi; 1662–1668	Succeeded by Filippo Alferio Ossorio
