= Nicola Pellegrini (bishop) =

Most Reverend Nicola Pellegrini
- Bishop of Fondi
- Church: Catholic Church
- Diocese: Diocese of Fondi
- In office: 1500–1520
- Predecessor: Pietro Gaetani
- Successor: Giacomo Pellegrini

Personal details
- Died: 1520 Fondi, Italy

Nicola Pellegrini (died 1520) was a Roman Catholic prelate who served as Bishop of Fondi (1500–1520).

== Biography ==
On 29 January 1500, Nicola Pellegrini was appointed during the papacy of Pope Alexander VI as Bishop of Fondi. He served as Bishop of Fondi until his death in 1520.

Catholic Church titles
Preceded by Pietro Gaetani	Bishop of Fondi; 1500–1520	Succeeded by Giacomo Pellegrini
