= Francesco Bonciani =

Most Reverend Franciscus Boncianni
- Archbishop of Pisa
- Church: Catholic Church
- Archdiocese: Archdiocese of Pisa
- In office: 1613–1620
- Predecessor: Sallustio Tarugi
- Successor: Giuliano de' Medici

Orders
- Consecration: 10 November 1613 by Ottavio Bandini

Personal details
- Died: 1620 Pisa, Italy

Franciscus Boncianni or Franciscus Boncianni (died 1620) was a Roman Catholic prelate who served as Archbishop of Pisa (1613–1620).

== Biography ==
On 6 November 1613, Francesco Bonciani was appointed during the papacy of Pope Paul V as Archbishop of Pisa. On 10 November 1613, he was consecrated bishop by Ottavio Bandini, Cardinal-Priest of Santa Sabina, with Attilio Amalteo, Titular Archbishop of Athenae, and Ulpiano Volpi, Archbishop of Chieti, serving as co-consecrators. He served as Archbishop of Pisa until his death in 1620.

== External links and additional sources ==
- Cantagalli, Roberto (1969). "BONCIANI, Francesco". Dizionario Biografico degli Italiani (in Italian). Vol. 11: Boccadibue–Bonetti. Rome: Istituto dell'Enciclopedia Italiana. ISBN 978-88-12-00032-6.
- Cheney, David M. "Archdiocese of Pisa". Catholic-Hierarchy.org. (for Chronology of Bishops) ^{[self-published]}
- Chow, Gabriel. "Metropolitan Archdiocese of Pisa (Italy)". GCatholic.org. (for Chronology of Bishops) ^{[self-published]}

Catholic Church titles
Preceded by Sallustio Tarugi	Archbishop of Pisa; 1613–1620	Succeeded by Giuliano de' Medici
