= Nicola Colafacio =

Roman Catholic bishop

Most Reverend Nicola Colafacio
- Bishop of Fondi
- Church: Catholic Church
- Diocese: Diocese of Fondi
- In office: 1445–1476
- Successor: Pietro Gaetani

Personal details
- Died: 1476 Fondi, Italy

Nicola Colafacio or Nicola de Faciis (died 1476) was a Roman Catholic prelate who served as Bishop of Fondi (1445–1476).

== Biography ==
On 27 January 1445, Nicola Colafacio was appointed during the papacy of Pope Eugene IV as Bishop of Fondi. He served as Bishop of Fondi until his death in 1476.

== Episcopal succession ==
While bishop, he was the principal co-consecrator of:

- Nicola de Genupia, Bishop of Mottola (1469);
- Pierre von Wedberch, Bishop of Ösell (1471); and
- Pietro Guglielmo de Rocha, Archbishop of Salerno (1471).

Catholic Church titles
Preceded by	Bishop of Fondi; 1445–1476	Succeeded by Pietro Gaetani
