= Giovanni Battista Comparini =

Roman Catholic Bishop of Fondi

Most Reverend Giovanni Battista Comparini
- Bishop of Fondi
- Church: Catholic Church
- Diocese: Diocese of Fondi
- In office: 1591–1616
- Predecessor: Pio Loterio
- Successor: Lelio Veterano

Personal details
- Died: 1616 Fondi, Papal States

Giovanni Battista Comparini (died 1616) was a Roman Catholic prelate who served as Bishop of Fondi (1591–1616).

== Biography ==
On 5 April 1591, Giovanni Battista Comparini was appointed during the papacy of Pope Gregory XIV as Bishop of Fondi. He served as Bishop of Fondi until his death in 1616.

Catholic Church titles
Preceded by Pio Loterio	Bishop of Fondi; 1591–1616	Succeeded by Lelio Veterano
