= San Matteo in Merulana =

San Matteo in Via Merulana was a titular church in Rome, dedicated to the Apostle and Evangelist Matthew, for cardinal priests (the intermediary class).

== History ==
San Matteo was first established as a titular church in 112 by Pope Alexander I, then suppressed in 600 by Pope Gregory I. (No incumbents known for that period).

It was revived in 1517 by Pope Leo X. The church was crumbling by 1775 and the title was not awarded between 1776 and 1801, when it was finally suppressed and transferred to Santa Maria della Vittoria.

The church once housed the famed Marian icon of Our Mother of Perpetual Help, now under the custody of the Redemptorist Order, later supplemented with another Marian image.

== List of titular Cardinal-priests ==
(medieval names also unavailable)

- Andrea Corsini (1769.09.11 – 1776.07.15), Promoted Cardinal-Bishop of Sabina
- Alberico Archinto (May 24, 1756 – September 20, 1756), Appointed Cardinal-Priest of San Lorenzo in Damaso
- Luigi Mattei (December 10, 1753 – April 5, 1756), Appointed Cardinal-Priest of Santa Maria in Ara Coeli
- Fortunato Tamburini, Benedictine Order (O.S.B.) (September 23, 1743 – April 9, 1753), Appointed Cardinal-Priest of San Callisto
- Vincenzo Bichi (August 29, 1740 – May 20, 1743), Appointed Cardinal-Priest of San Silvestro in Capite
- Giovanni Battista Altieri (iuniore) (November 20, 1724 – January 26, 1739), Promoted Cardinal-Bishop of Palestrina
- Nicola Grimaldi (June 8, 1716 – October 25, 1717)
- Francesco Nerli (iuniore) (September 25, 1673 – November 17, 1704), Appointed Cardinal-Priest of San Lorenzo in Lucina
- Francesco Maria Mancini (May 14, 1670 – June 29, 1672)
- Francesco Sacrati (May 17, 1621 – September 6, 1623)
- Francesco Sforza (November 13, 1617 – March 5, 1618), Promoted Cardinal-Bishop of Albano
- Roberto Ubaldini (April 3, 1617 – July 3, 1617), Appointed Cardinal-Priest of Santa Pudenziana
- Antonio Zapata y Cisneros (June 20, 1605 – June 5, 1606), Appointed Cardinal-Priest of Santa Croce in Gerusalemme
- Roberto Bellarmino, Jesuits S.J. (June 1, 1605 – August 31, 1621), Appointed Cardinal-Priest of Santa Prassede
- Giovanni Delfino (November 24, 1604 – June 1, 1605), Appointed Cardinal-Priest of San Marco
- Giovanni Evangelista Pallotta (January 15, 1588 – June 16, 1603), Appointed Cardinal-Priest of San Lorenzo in Lucina
- Decio Azzolini (seniore) (January 15, 1586 – October 9, 1587)
- Jérôme Souchier, Cistercians (O. Cist.) (January 24, 1569 – November 10, 1571)
- Gianbernardino Scotti, C.R. (January 13, 1556 – December 11, 1568)
- Girolamo Dandini (December 4, 1551 – October 25, 1555), Appointed Cardinal-Priest of San Marcello (al Corso)
- Bartolomé de la Cueva y Toledo (May 5, 1546 – December 4, 1551), Appointed Cardinal-Priest of San Bartolomeo all'Isola
- Charles de Hémard de Denonville (January 15, 1537 – August 23, 1540)
- Giles of Viterbo, Order of St. Augustine (O.E.S.A.) (July 10, 1517 – May 9, 1530), Appointed Cardinal-Priest of San Marcello (al Corso)
- Cristoforo Numai, Franciscans (O.F.M. Obs.) (July 6, 1517 – July 10, 1517), Cardinal-Priest of Santa Maria in Ara Coeli

== Sources and external links ==
- CatholicHierarchy
- GCatholic, with incumbent biography links
