= Giacomo Pellegrini =

Bishop of Fondi, Italy from 1520 to 1537

Most Reverend Giacomo Pellegrini
- Bishop of Fondi
- Church: Catholic Church
- Diocese: Diocese of Fondi
- In office: 1520–1537
- Predecessor: Nicola Pellegrini (bishop)
- Successor: Giovanni Angelo Pellegrini

Giacomo Pellegrini was a Roman Catholic prelate who served as Bishop of Fondi (1520–1537).

On 1 October 1520, Giacomo Pellegrini was appointed during the papacy of Pope Leo X as Bishop of Fondi. He served as Bishop of Fondi until his resignation in 1537.

Catholic Church titles
Preceded by Nicola Pellegrini (bishop)	Bishop of Fondi; 1520–1537	Succeeded by Giovanni Angelo Pellegrini
