= Matteo Gagliani =

17th and 18th-century Italian Catholic bishop

Most Reverend Matteo Gagliani
- Bishop of Sora
- Church: Catholic Church
- Diocese: Diocese of Sora
- In office: 1703–1717
- Predecessor: Tommaso Guzzoni
- Successor: Gabriele de Marchis

Orders
- Consecration: 2 August 1693 by Galeazzo Marescotti

Personal details
- Born: 9 October 1655 Naples, Kingdom of Naples
- Died: September 1717 (age 61) Sora, Papal States

Matteo Gagliani (9 October 1655 – September 1717) was a Roman Catholic prelate who served as Bishop of Sora (1703–1717) and Bishop of Fondi (1693–1703).

== Biography ==
Matteo Gagliani was born in Naples, Italy. On 20 July 1693, he was appointed during the papacy of Pope Innocent XII as Bishop of Fondi. On 2 August 1693, he was consecrated bishop by Galeazzo Marescotti, Cardinal-Priest of Santi Quirico e Giulitta, with Prospero Bottini, Titular Archbishop of Myra, and Giovanni Battista Visconti Aicardi, Bishop of Novara, serving as co-consecrators. On 15 January 1703, he was appointed during the papacy of Pope Clement XI as Bishop of Sora. He served as Bishop of Sora until his death in September 1717.

== Episcopal succession ==
While bishop, Gagliani was the principal co-consecrator:

- Giacinto della Calce, Bishop of Ariano (1697);
- Tommaso Maria Franza, Bishop of Oria (1697); and
- Giambattista Isnardi de Castello, Bishop of Mondovi (1697).

== External links and additional sources ==
- Cheney, David M. "Diocese of Sora-Cassino-Aquino-Portecorvino". Catholic-Hierarchy.org. (for Chronology of Bishops) ^{[self-published]}
- Chow, Gabriel. "Diocese of Sora-Cassino-Aquino-Portecorvino (Italy)". GCatholic.org. (for Chronology of Bishops) ^{[self-published]}

Catholic Church titles
Preceded by Filippo Alferio Ossorio	Bishop of Fondi; 1693–1703	Succeeded by Vittore Felice Conci
Preceded by Tommaso Guzzoni	Bishop of Sora; 1703–1717	Succeeded by Gabriele de Marchis
