= Jean de Dammartin =

Jean de Dammartin or Jehan de Dammartin sometimes spelled Dampmartin (14th-century in Jargeau (former province of the Orléanais – 1454 in Tours) was a 15th-century French architect.

He was the son of Drouet de Dammartin and probably Guy de Dammartin's nephew.

== Biography ==
Jean de Dammartin was the architect of the transept of the Saint-Julien du Mans Cathedral, between 1420 and 1431.

Forced to leave Le Mans after the English took the city during the Hundred Years' War, he succeeded Olivier Freredoux as architect of the cathédrale Saint-Gatien de Tours from 1431 and worked there until 1453 on the facade, when he was replaced by Jean Papin. He is referred to in the texts as "maistre and governor of the church of Tours".

Jean married Jeannette Moreau and had a son, Huguet de Dammartin, sculptor, who worked under his direction, as early as 1431, on the facade of the Tours Cathedral.

Jean de Dammartin died in Tours in 1454.

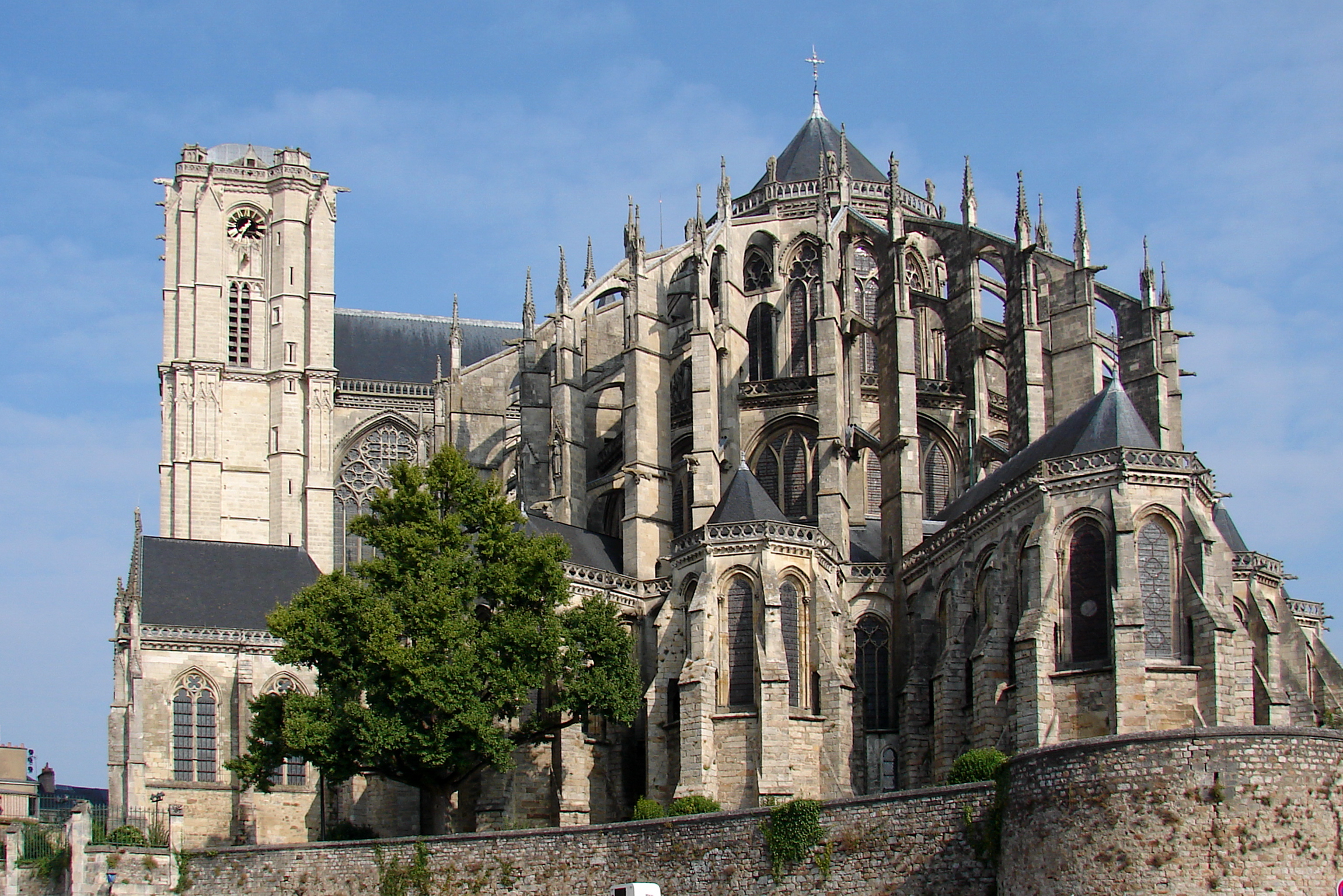
Saint-Julien du Mans Cathedral

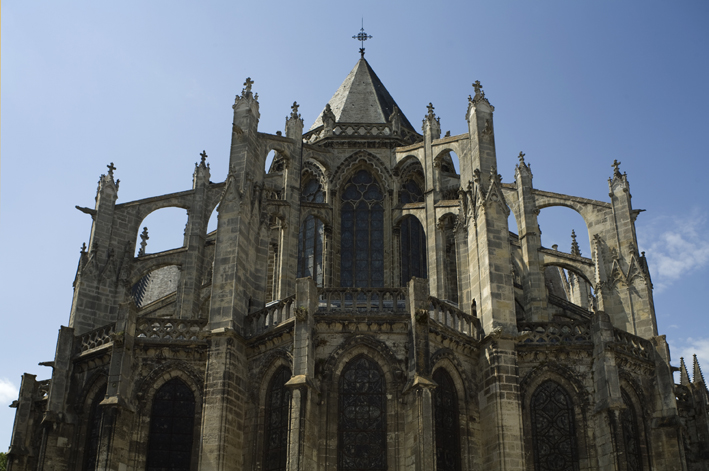
Saint-Gatien de Tours
