= Pietro Paolo Pinto =

Most Reverend Pietro Paolo Pinto
- Bishop of Fondi
- Church: Catholic Church
- Diocese: Diocese of Fondi
- In office: 1640–1661
- Predecessor: Maurizio Ragano
- Successor: Simone Oliverio

Personal details
- Died: September 1661 Fondi, Italy

Pietro Paolo Pinto, O.F.M. Conv. (died 1661) was a Roman Catholic prelate who served as Bishop of Fondi (1640–1661).

Pinto was ordained a priest in the Order of Friars Minor Conventual. On 13 August 1640, he was appointed during the papacy of Pope Urban VIII as Bishop of Fondi. He served as Bishop of Fondi until his death in September 1661.

Catholic Church titles
| Preceded by Maurizio Ragano | Bishop of Fondi; 1640–1661 | Succeeded by Simone Oliverio |
