= Roberto Ubaldini =

17th-century Catholic cardinal

His Eminence Roberto Ubaldini
- Cardinal-Priest of Santa Prassede
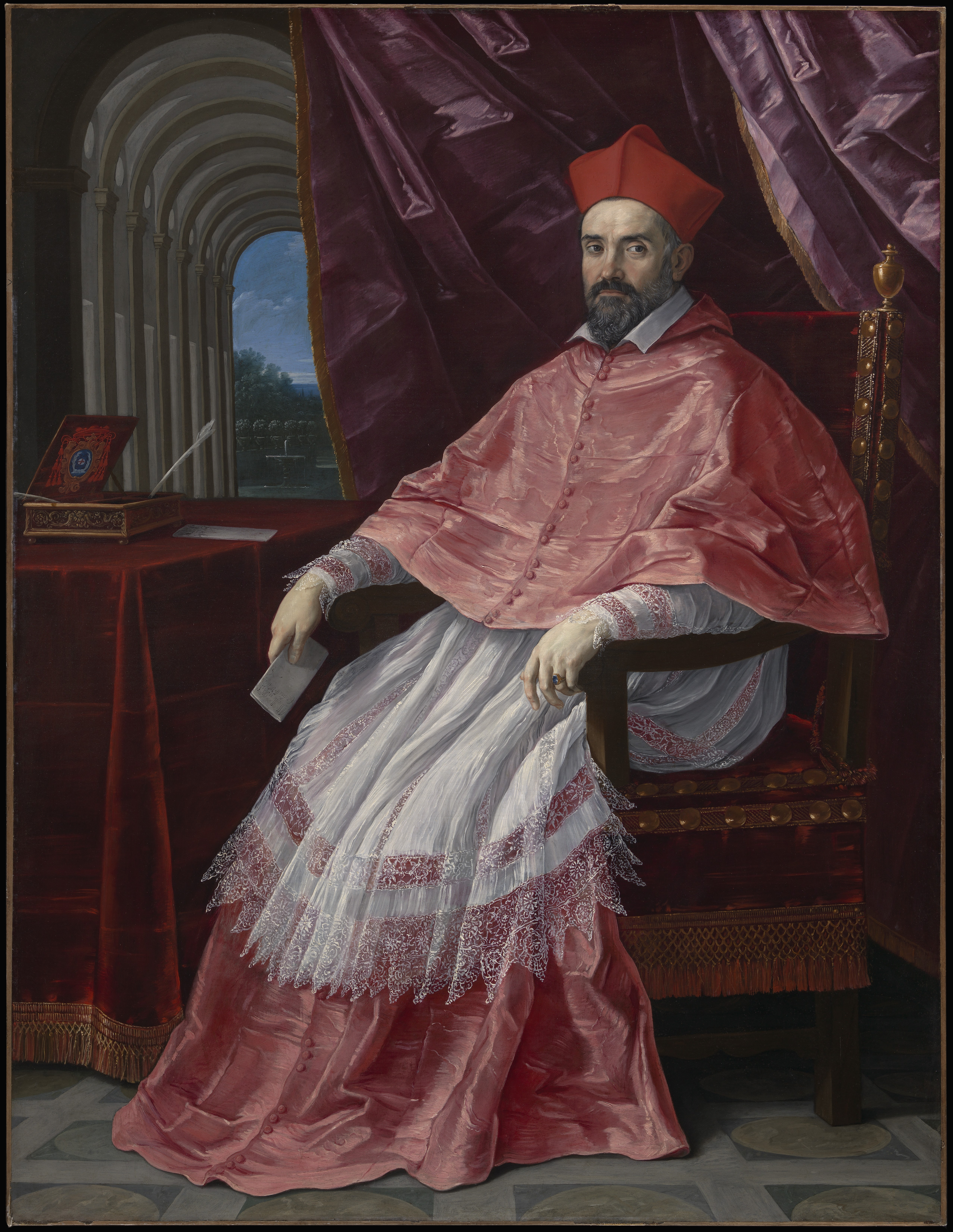
- Portrait by Guido Reni
- Church: Catholic Church

Orders
- Consecration: 3 Feb 1608 by Jacques Davy du Perron

Personal details
- Born: 1581 Florence, Italy
- Died: 22 Apr 1635 (age 54)

Roberto Ubaldini (1581 – 22 April 1635) was a bishop and cardinal of the Catholic Church.

== Biography ==
He was born in Florence. He was appointed Bishop of Montepulciano in 1607, and ordained to that post on 3 Feb 1608 by Jacques Davy du Perron, Archbishop of Sens, with Henri de Gondi, Bishop of Paris, and Jean de Bonsi, Bishop of Béziers, serving as co-consecrators. He was elevated to the status of cardinal in 1615, and made Prefect of the Sacred Congregation of the Council in 1621. He resigned from that position in 1623, shortly after resigning his position as bishop.

He served as nuncio in France, and served as secretary to Pope Paul V. He maintained a friendship with poets Marini and Bracciolini.

== Episcopal succession ==
While bishop, he was the principal consecrator of:

- Benjamin de Brichanteau, Coadjutor Bishop of Laon and Titular Bishop of Philadelphia in Arabia (1608);
- Claude de Gelas, Bishop of Agen (1609);
- Augustin Potier, Bishop of Beauvais (1617);
- Alessandro Scappi, Bishop of Satriano e Campagna (1618);
- Alfonso Pozzi, Bishop of Borgo San Donnino (1620);
- Giuliano de' Medici, Archbishop of Pisa (1620);
- Luigi Capponi, Archbishop of Ravenna (1621);
- Honorius Griffagni, Bishop of Montepeloso (1621);
- Guillaume Du Nozet, Titular Archbishop of Seleucia in Isauria (1621);
- Ottavio Orsini, Bishop of Venafro (1621);
- Fabrizio Antinori, Archbishop of Acerenza e Matera (1622);
- Cosmas Minerbetti, Bishop of Cortona (1622);
- Alexandre della Stufa (Lotteringhi), Bishop of Montepulciano (1623); and
- Dominico Rota, Titular Bishop of Sidon (1628).

Catholic Church titles
Preceded by Maffeo Barberini	Papal nuncio to France; 1606 – 1616	Succeeded by Guido Bentivoglio
