= Andrea Matteo Acquaviva d'Aragona =

Italian Catholic bishop (fl 1558 - 1576)

Most Reverend Andrea Matteo Acquaviva d'Aragona
- Archbishop of Cosenza
- Church: Catholic Church
- In office: 1573-1576
- Predecessor: Flavio Orsini
- Successor: Fantino Petrignani
- Previous post: Bishop of Venafro (1558-1573)

Personal details
- Died: 1576
- Coat of arms

Andrea Matteo Acquaviva d'Aragona (died 1576) was a Roman Catholic prelate who served as Archbishop of Cosenza (1573–1576) and Bishop of Venafro (1558–1573).

== Biography ==
On 20 July 1558, Andrea Matteo Acquaviva d'Aragona was appointed during the papacy of Pope Paul IV as Bishop of Venafro. On 16 September 1573, he was appointed during the papacy of Pope Gregory XIII as Archbishop of Cosenza. He served as Archbishop of Cosenza until his death in 1576. While bishop, he was the principal co-consecrator of Beatus di Porta, Bishop of Chur (1565).

== External links and additional sources ==
- Cheney, David M. "Diocese of Venafro". Catholic-Hierarchy.org. (for Chronology of Bishops) ^{[self-published]}
- Chow, Gabriel. "Diocese of Venafro (Italy)". GCatholic.org. (for Chronology of Bishops) ^{[self-published]}
- Cheney, David M. "Archdiocese of Cosenza-Bisignano". Catholic-Hierarchy.org. (for Chronology of Bishops) ^{[self-published]}
- Chow, Gabriel. "Metropolitan Archdiocese of Cosenza-Bisignano (Italy)". GCatholic.org. (for Chronology of Bishops) ^{[self-published]}

Catholic Church titles
| Preceded by Giovanni Antonio Carafa | Bishop of Venafro; 1558–1573 | Succeeded by Orazio Caracciolo |
| Preceded by Flavio Orsini | Archbishop of Cosenza; 1573–1576 | Succeeded by Fantino Petrignani |
