= Filippo Alferio Ossorio =

17th-century Catholic Bishop of Fondi

Most Reverend Filippo Alferio Ossorio
- Bishop of Fondi
- Church: Catholic Church
- Diocese: Diocese of Fondi
- In office: 1669–1693
- Predecessor: Simone Oliverio
- Successor: Matteo Gagliani

Orders
- Consecration: 7 April 1669 by Francesco Maria Brancaccio

Personal details
- Born: 1634 L'Aquila, Italy
- Died: 24 February 1693 (age 59) Fondi, Italy

Filippo Alferio Ossorio (1634 – 24 February 1693) was a Roman Catholic prelate who served as Bishop of Fondi (1669–1693).

== Biography ==
Filippo Alferio Ossorio was born in L'Aquila, Italy in 1634. On 1 April 1669, he was appointed during the papacy of Pope Clement IX as Bishop of Fondi. On 7 April 1669, he was consecrated bishop by Francesco Maria Brancaccio, Cardinal-Bishop of Frascati, with Stefano Brancaccio, Titular Archbishop of Hadrianopolis in Haemimonto, and Emmanuele Brancaccio, Bishop of Ariano, serving as co-consecrators. He served as Bishop of Fondi until his death on 24 February 1693.

Catholic Church titles
Preceded by Simone Oliverio	Bishop of Fondi; 1669–1693	Succeeded by Matteo Gagliani
