= Guillaume Du Nozet =

Most Reverend Guillaume Du Nozet
- Titular Archbishop of Seleucia in Isauria
- Church: Catholic Church
- In office: 1621–1626
- Successor: Antonio Santacroce

Orders
- Consecration: 12 April 1621

Personal details
- Died: 20 November 1626

Guillaume Du Nozet (died 20 November 1626) was a Roman Catholic prelate who served as Titular Archbishop of Seleucia in Isauria (1621–1626).

== Biography ==
On 17 March 1621, Guillaume Du Nozet was appointed during the papacy of Pope Gregory XV as Titular Archbishop of Seleucia in Isauria. On 12 April 1621, he was consecrated bishop by Roberto Ubaldini, Bishop of Montepulciano, with Francesco Sacrati (cardinal), Titular Archbishop of Damascus, and Alessandro Scappi, Bishop of Satriano e Campagna, serving as co-consecrators. He served as Titular Archbishop of Seleucia in Isauria until his death on 20 November 1626. While bishop, he was the principal co-consecrator of Bernardino Spada, Titular Archbishop of Tamiathis (1623).

Catholic Church titles
Preceded by	Titular Archbishop of Seleucia in Isauria; 1621–1626	Succeeded by Antonio Santacroce
