= Pio Loterio =

Most Reverend Pio Loterio
- Bishop of Fondi
- Church: Catholic Church
- Diocese: Diocese of Fondi
- In office: 1576–1591
- Predecessor: Matteo Andrea Guerra
- Successor: Giovanni Battista Comparini

Personal details
- Died: 1591 Fondi, Italy

Pio Loterio, O.S.B. (died 1591) was a Roman Catholic prelate who served as Bishop of Fondi (1576–1591).

== Biography ==
Pio Loterio was ordained a bishop in the Order of Saint Benedict. On 27 February 1576, he was appointed during the papacy of Pope Gregory XIII as Bishop of Fondi. He served as Bishop of Fondi until his death in 1591.

Catholic Church titles
Preceded by Matteo Andrea Guerra	Bishop of Fondi; 1576–1591	Succeeded by Giovanni Battista Comparini
