= Lelio Veterano =

Italian Roman Catholic bishop (1580–1619)

Most Reverend Lelio Veterano
- Bishop of Fondi
- Church: Catholic Church
- Diocese: Diocese of Fondi
- In office: 1616–1619
- Predecessor: Giovanni Battista Comparini
- Successor: Giovanni Agostino Gandolfo

Orders
- Consecration: 13 December 1616 by Giovanni Garzia Mellini

Personal details
- Born: 1580
- Died: 1619 (age 39) Fondi, Italy

Lelio Veterano (1580–1619) was a Roman Catholic prelate who served as Bishop of Fondi (1616–1619).

== Biography ==
Lelio Veterano was born in 1580. On 5 December 1616, he was appointed during the papacy of Pope Paul V as Bishop of Fondi. On 13 December 1616, he was consecrated bishop by Giovanni Garzia Mellini, Cardinal-Priest of Santi Quattro Coronati, with Francesco Sacrati (cardinal), Titular Archbishop of Damascus, and Vincenzo Landinelli, Bishop of Albenga, serving as co-consecrators. He served as Bishop of Fondi until his death in 1619.

Catholic Church titles
Preceded by Giovanni Battista Comparini	Bishop of Fondi; 1616–1619	Succeeded by Giovanni Agostino Gandolfo
