= Maurizio Ragano =

Most Reverend Maurizio Ragano
- Bishop of Fondi
- Church: Catholic Church
- Diocese: Diocese of Fondi
- In office: 1636–1640
- Predecessor: Giovanni Agostino Gandolfo
- Successor: Pietro Paolo Pinto

Personal details
- Died: 1640 Fondi, Italy

Maurizio Ragano (died 1640) was a Roman Catholic prelate who served as Bishop of Fondi (1636–1640).

== Biography ==
On 7 April 1636, Maurizio Ragano was appointed during the papacy of Pope Urban VIII as Bishop of Fondi. On 13 April 1636, he was consecrated bishop by Ciriaco Rocci, Cardinal-Priest of San Salvatore in Lauro, with Domenico Ravenna, Bishop of Nicastro, and Ottavio Orsini, Bishop of Segni, serving as co-consecrators. He served as Bishop of Fondi until his death in 1640.

Catholic Church titles
Preceded by Giovanni Agostino Gandolfo	Bishop of Fondi; 1636–1640	Succeeded by Pietro Paolo Pinto
