= Jérôme Souchier =

Jérôme Souchier (1508–1571) was a French Roman Catholic cardinal.

== Biography ==
The son of a noble family, Jérôme Souchier was born in Auvergne in 1508. As a young man, he joined the Cistercian Order at Montpeyroux Abbey. The order sent him to study at the Cistercian College in Paris, where he received doctorates in philosophy and theology. He was also admitted to the theologians of the Collège de Sorbonne. He was subsequently ordained as a priest.

From 1550 to 1571, he was the Abbot of Clairvaux. He participated in the Council of Trent, 1562–1563. From 1567 to 1571, he was also the Abbot of Cîteaux and the superior general of the Cistercian Order. During that time, he issues a set of ecclesiastical ordinances (usually referred to as the Ordinationes) based on the principles of the Council of Trent. At various times, Henry II of France, Francis II of France, and Charles IX of France all sought his advice.

Pope Pius V made him a cardinal priest in the consistory of 24 March 1568. He received the red hat and the titular church of San Matteo in Via Merulana on 24 January 1569.

He died in Rome on 10 November 1571. He was buried in Santa Croce in Gerusalemme.
