= Pietro Gaetani =

Most Reverend Pietro Gaetani
- Bishop of Fondi
- Church: Catholic Church
- Diocese: Diocese of Fondi
- In office: 1476–1500
- Predecessor: Nicola Colafacio
- Successor: Nicola Pellegrini (bishop)

Personal details
- Died: 1500 Fondi, Italy

Pietro Gaetani (died 1500) was a Roman Catholic prelate who served as Bishop of Fondi (1476–1500).

On 31 May 1476, Pietro Gaetani was appointed during the papacy of Pope Sixtus IV as Bishop of Fondi. He served as Bishop of Fondi until his death in 1500.

Catholic Church titles
Preceded by Nicola Colafacio	Bishop of Fondi; 1476–1500	Succeeded by Nicola Pellegrini (bishop)
