= Tours Cathedral =

- Cathedral of Saint Gatianus of Tours
- French: Cathédrale Saint-Gatien de Tours
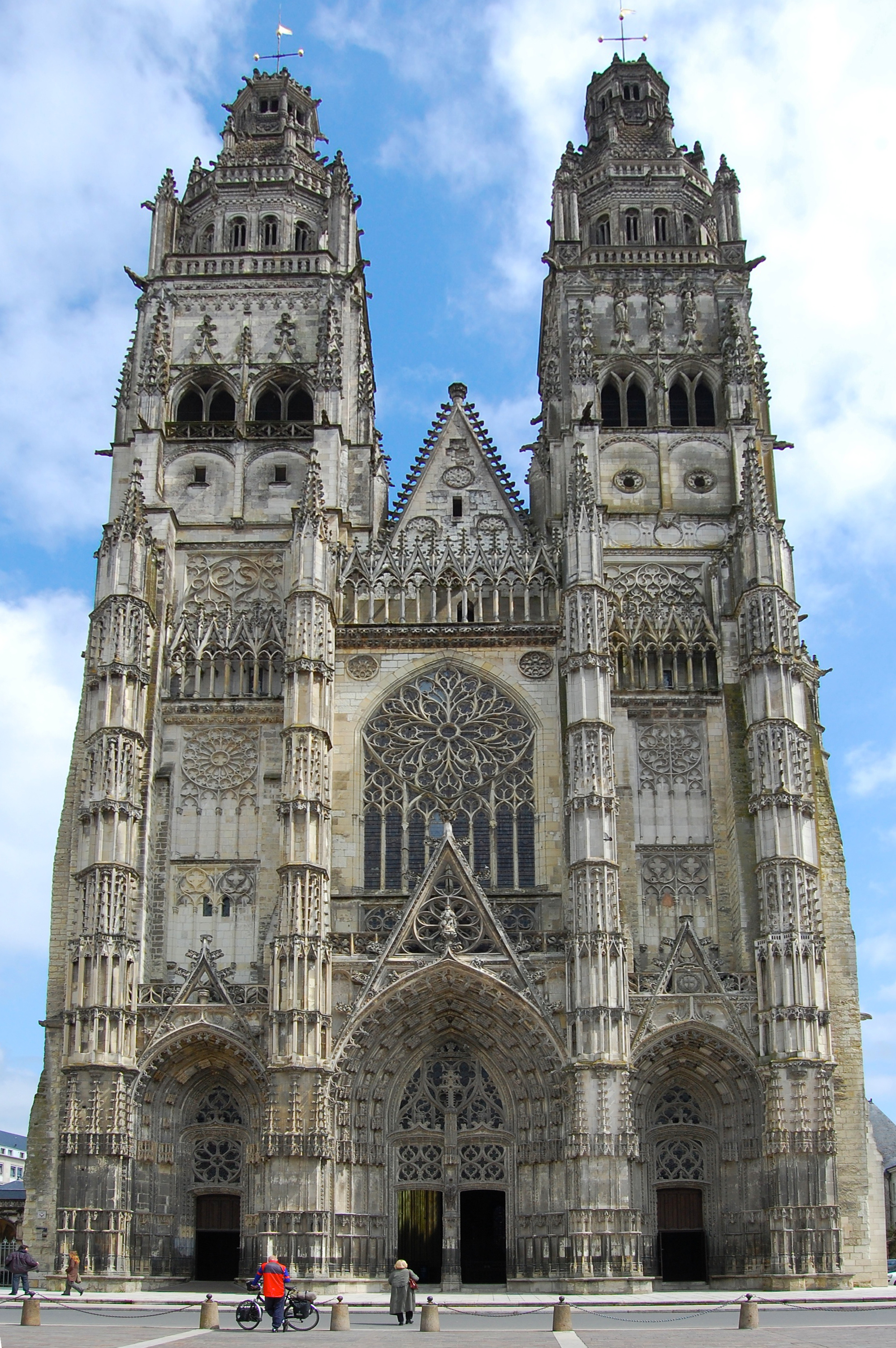
- Tours Cathedral
- Tours Cathedral
- Location: Tours, Indre-et-Loire
- Country: France
- Denomination: Roman Catholic Church
- Website: www.paroisse-cathedrale-tours.fr

History
- Status: Cathedral
- Dedication: Gatianus of Tours

Architecture
- Functional status: Active
- Architectural type: Church
- Style: French Gothic
- Groundbreaking: 1170
- Completed: 1547

Specifications
- Length: 100 metres (330 ft)
- Width: 28 metres (92 ft)

Administration
- Archdiocese: Tours
- Parish: St. Maurice

Clergy
- Archbishop: Bernard-Nicolas Aubertin (fr)

Monument historique
- Official name: Cathédrale Saint-Gatien de Tours
- Type: Classé
- Designated: 1862
- Reference no.: IA00071346

Tours Cathedral (French: Cathédrale Saint-Gatien de Tours) is a Roman Catholic church located in Tours, Indre-et-Loire, France. It is the seat of the Archbishops of Tours, the metropolitan cathedral of the Tours ecclesiastical province and is dedicated to Saint Gatianus. Built between 1170 and 1547, the church has been a classified monument historique since 1862 and has been owned by the French State, with the Catholic Church having the exclusive rights of use.

== History ==
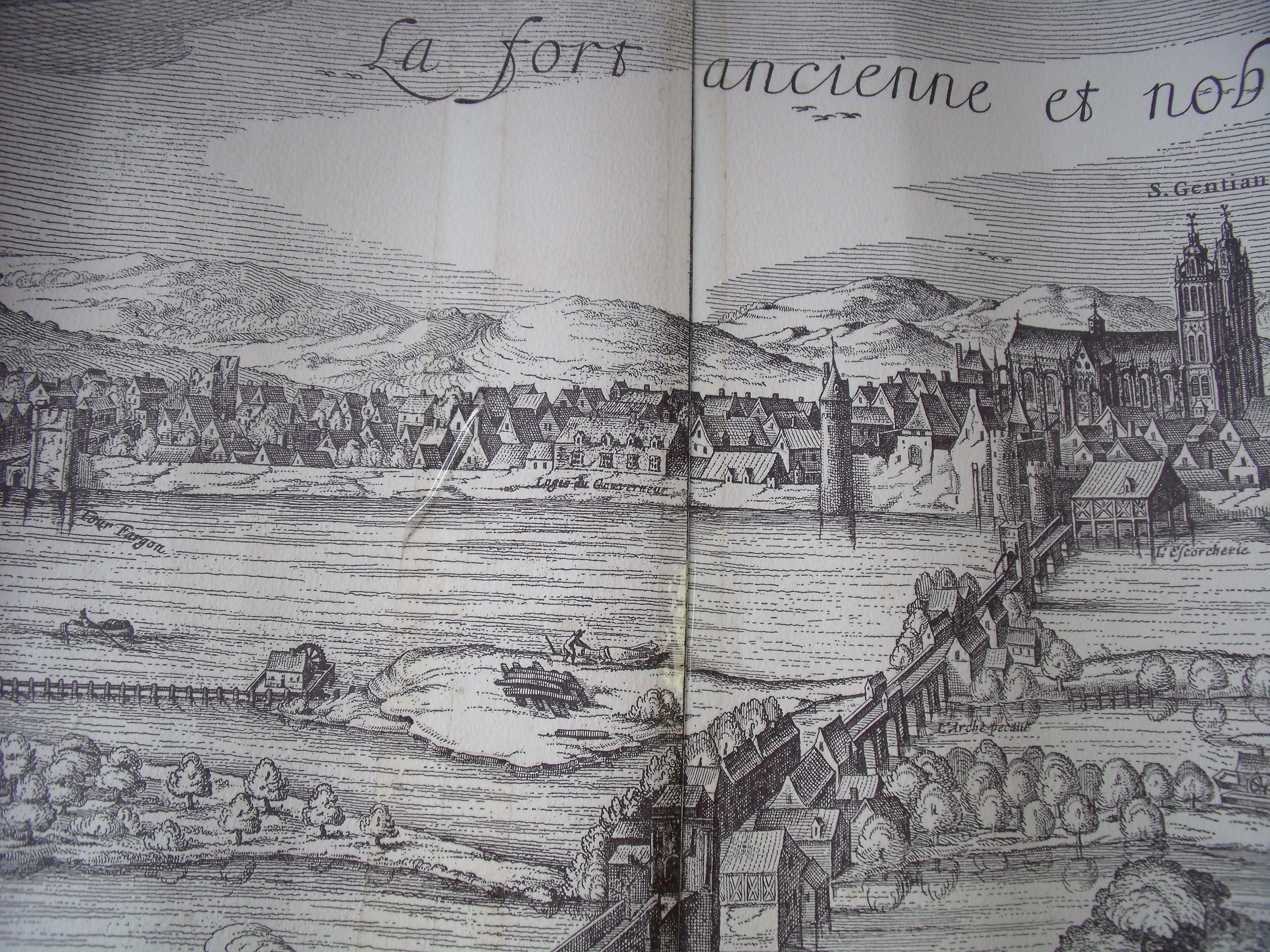
The cathedral in 1625

Three earlier cathedrals existed on the same site. The first cathedral, dedicated to Saint Maurice, was built by Bishop Lidorius from 337 to 371 and located at the south end of the bridge over the river Loire, on the road from Paris to the southwestern regions of the country. It burned down in 558, and was rebuilt by the Bishop Gregory of Tours and rededicated in 590. Its location, at the south-west angle of the castrum, or old Roman walls, resulted in the cathedral entrance being part of the old Roman city wall. Beginning in about 1160, another structure built in the Angevin style was begun; it was badly damaged by fire and never finished.

Work recommenced with the choir in about 1220 after receiving financial assistance from Louis IX. The choir and transept were rebuilt between 1240 and the beginning of the 14th century, using portions of the lower walls of the Romanesque structure. At the end of the 14th century, the transept was completed, and the cathedral was re-dedicated in 1356 to Saint Gatianus.

Further work and the construction of the towers were interrupted by the Hundred Years War. The nave was only finished during the 15th century by architects Jean de Dammartin, Jean Papin and Jean Durand, with financial assistance from Charles VII and the Duke of Brittany Jean V. In 1484 the lower portals were completed, and the two new towers were erected just outside the old city walls. The first tower was finished in 1534 and the second in 1547, with French Renaissance features in their crowns.

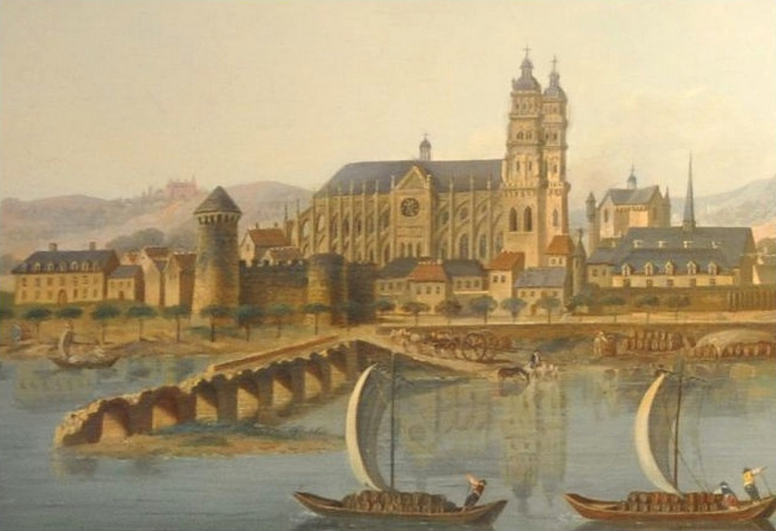
The cathedral in the 18th century (Musée des Beaux-Arts de Tours)

In 1787, responding to Vatican doctrines calling for making interiors of churches more open and welcoming, the jubé, or choir screen, which separated the choir from the nave, was removed. In 1793, during the French Revolution, the church was heavily damaged by Jacobins, who smashed the statues on the church portal. However, unlike other churches in France, the cathedral was spared from complete destruction and functioned as a Temple of Reason until the reign of Napoleon I. In 1848, a small restoration project was done, with portions of the cathedral, including the portal sculpture, restored.

A major restoration of the cathedral began in 1993, beginning with the upper windows. The organ restoration was completed in 1996, followed with the north transept and its rose window in 2010 and 2013. In addition to restoration, two hundred square meters of new windows, dedicated to Saint Martin, were added to cathedral and a new main altar was dedicated in 2018.

== Architecture ==
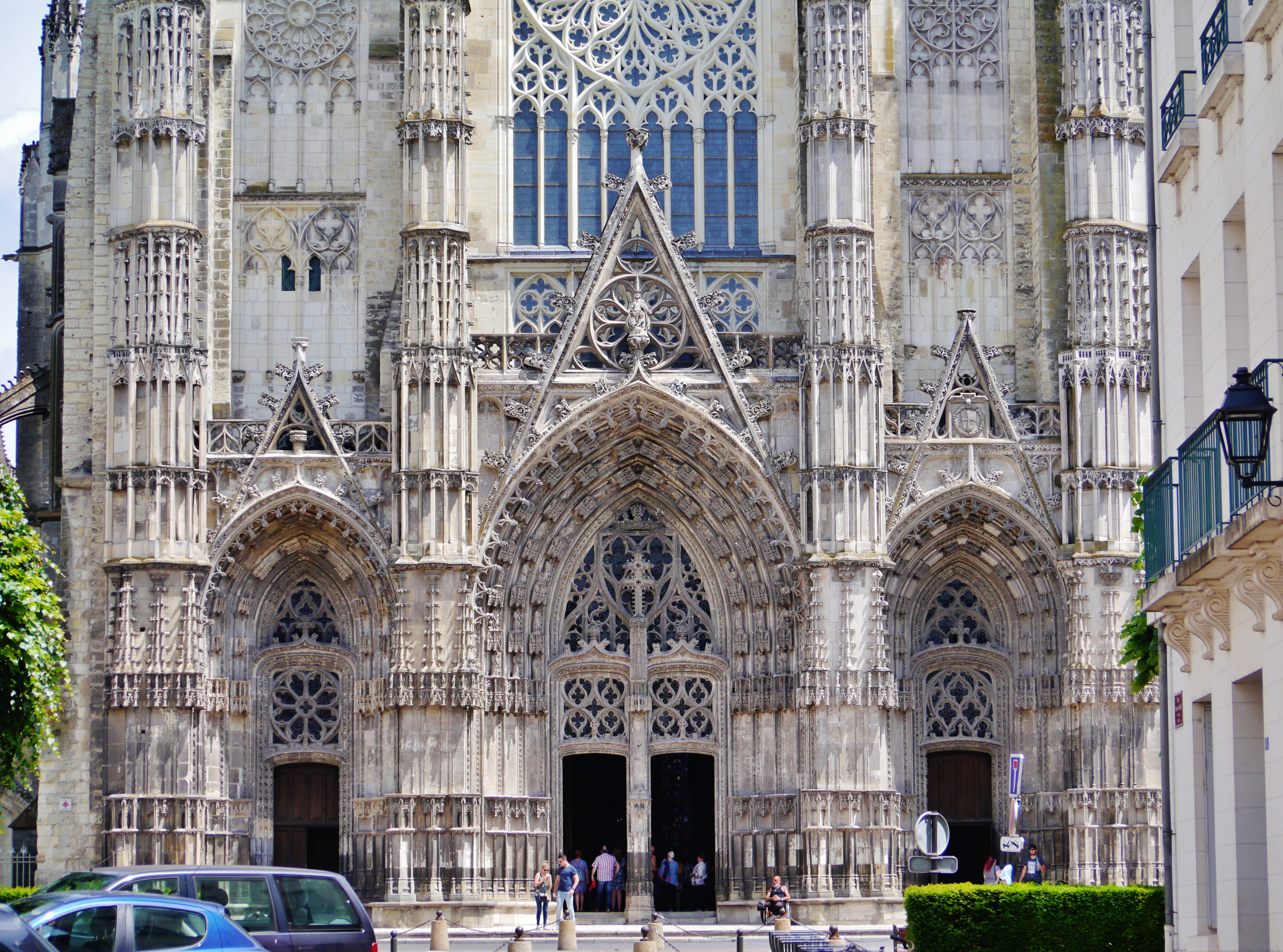
West front portals

=== Exterior – west front ===
The west front of the cathedral displays three different styles of architecture. The lower walls of the towers and the central block of the facade up to the triangular fronton date were built in Romanesque style, and the rest of the front, along with the buttresses, were covered with much more ornate Flamboyant decoration.

== Transepts and chevet ==
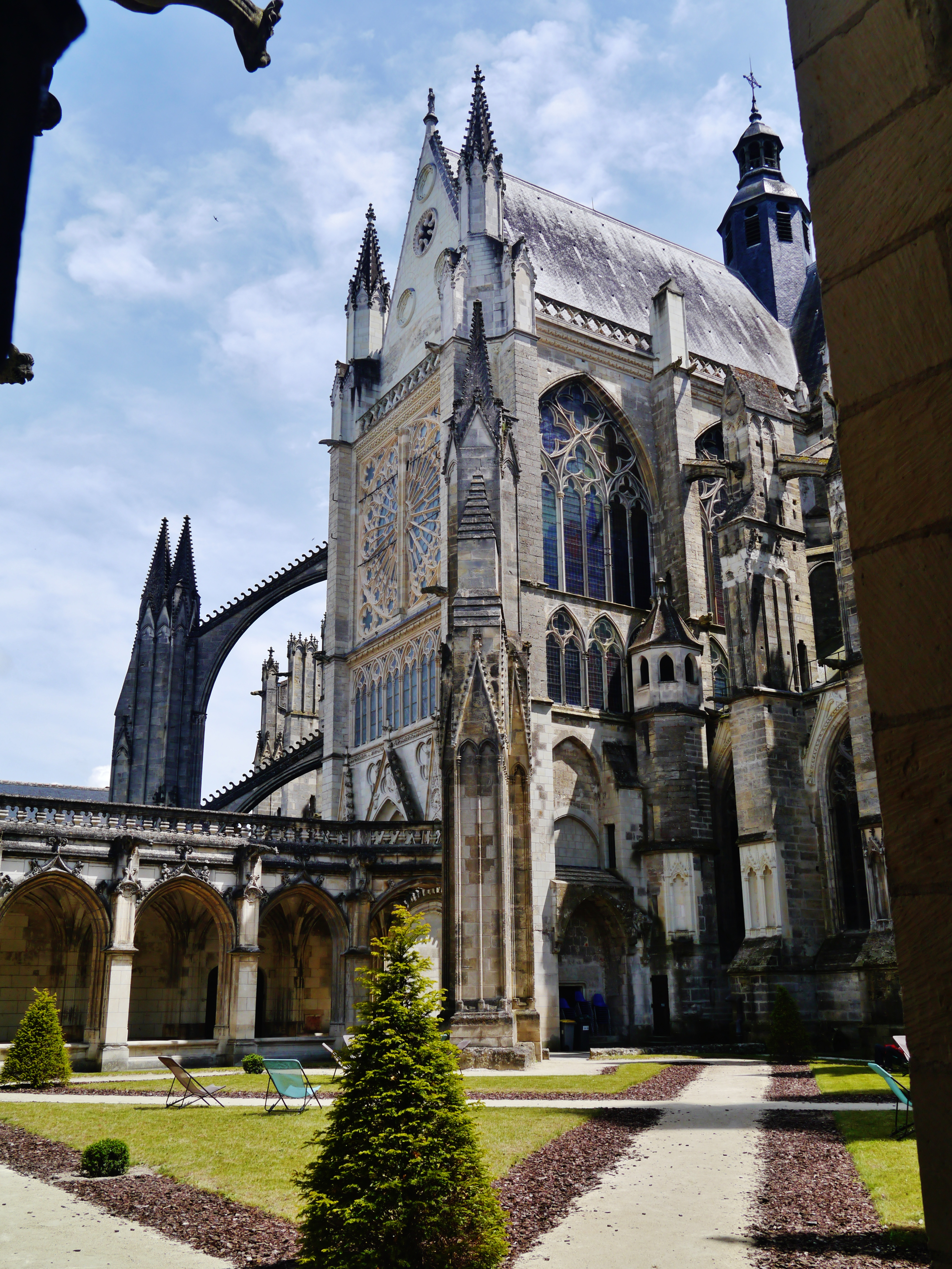
North transept of the cathedral

The sides of the cathedral are reinforced with massive flying buttresses, capped with spires to add additional weight for stabilization. The chevet of the cathedral, at the east end, unique among European Gothic cathedrals in not having any other structures attached to it. The north transept of the cathedral is also unusual in that it has two additional buttresses to support the north front.

== Towers ==
The two towers have heights of 69 and 70 metres. Portions of the bases of the towers date to the 12th century, The faces of the towers are covered with very elaborate tracery and decoration in the later Flamboyant style. The top sections of the two towers, which completed the structures, with heights of 69 and 70 metres, are early examples of French Renaissance architecture.

== Interior ==
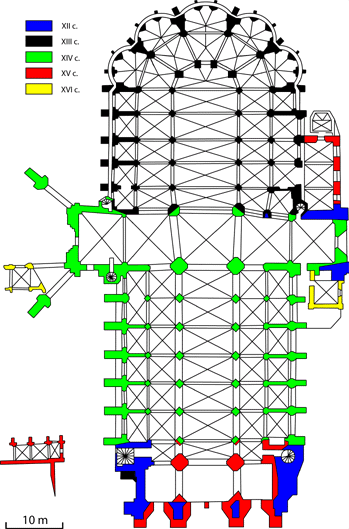
Plan with dates of construction

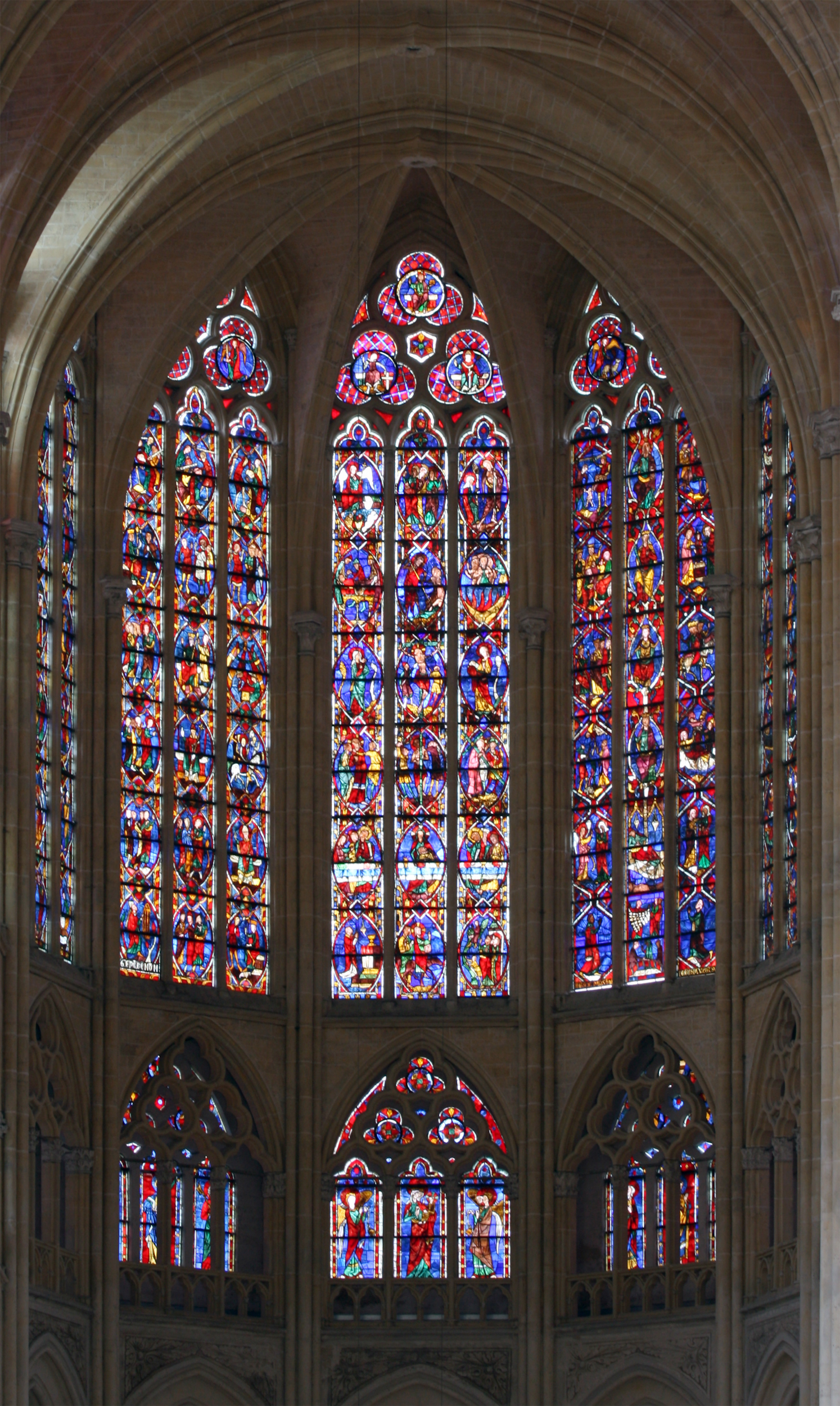
The Choir

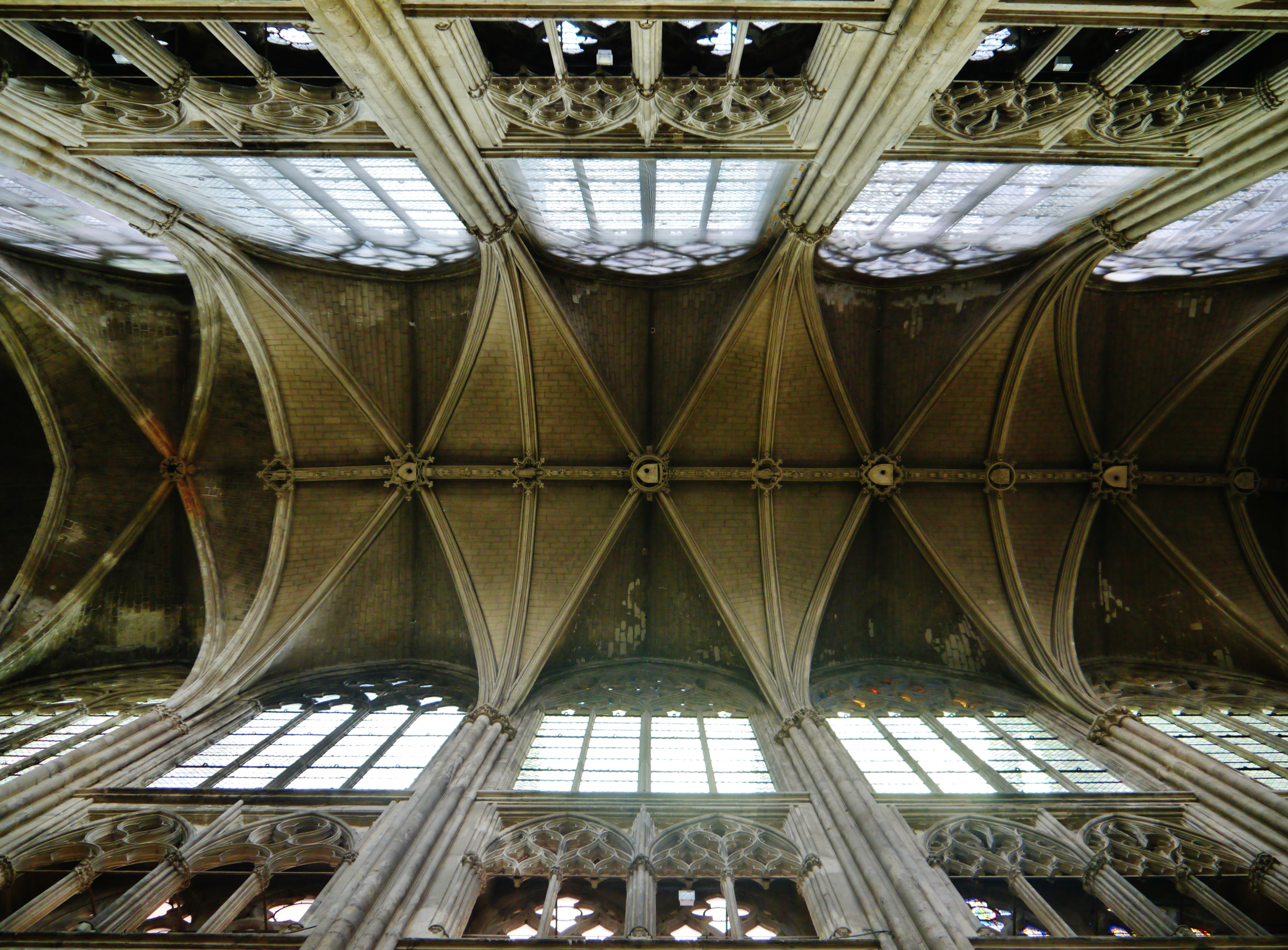
The Nave vaulting

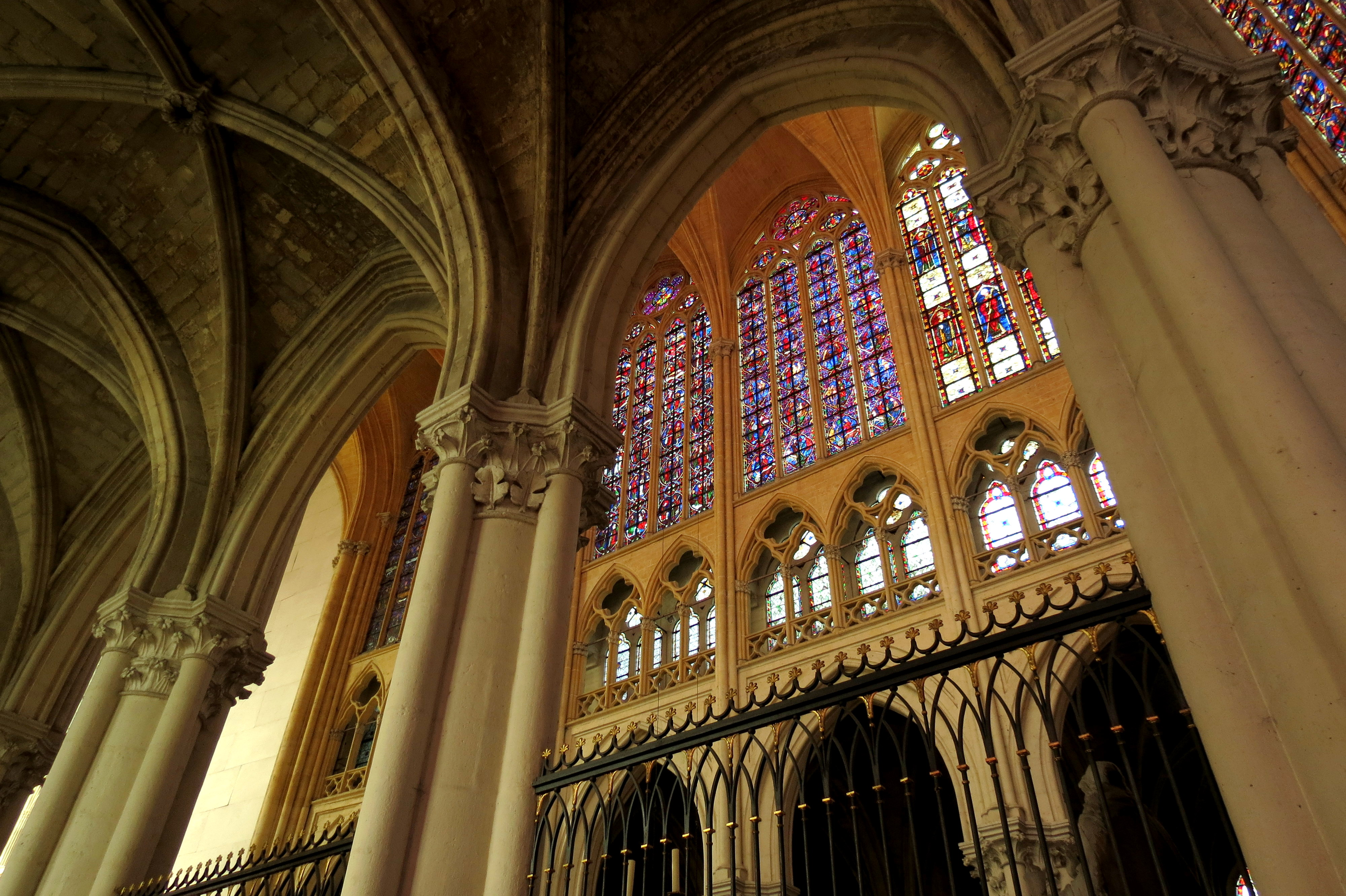
Upper windows

The nave has the traditional three levels; a gallery on the ground floor with pillars supporting the ribs of the vaulted ceiling; a mid-level triforium, and a clerestory with tall windows filling the upper walls. The nave has a height of 29 metres, but a width less than other French cathedrals presumably due to the re-use of an earlier Romanesque foundation. The vaults are covered with the original roof structure, composed of wooden beams from the 13th century in the choir, and from the 15th century in the nave.

The choir still has its fifteen original 13th-century windows, which feature both scenes of the lives of Christ, Apostles and Saints, as well as windows which depict the professions of the guilds which contributed to the financing of the windows.

== Art and decoration ==
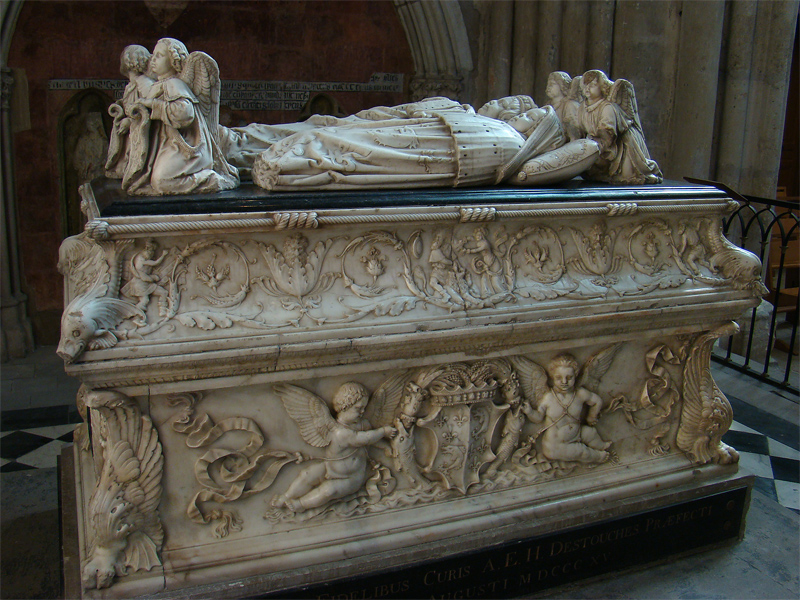
Tomb of Charles Orland and Charles, two sons of Anne and Charles VIII

The nave contains a monumental tomb, that of the two children of King Charles VIII of France and Anne of Brittany. It was made in 1506 by Guillaume Regnault and was originally located in the church of St. Martin before being moved to the cathedral after the French Revolution. The tomb is made of Carrara marble in the Italian style. The recumbent statues are reminiscent of the 15th-century French medieval tradition (school of Michel Colombe).

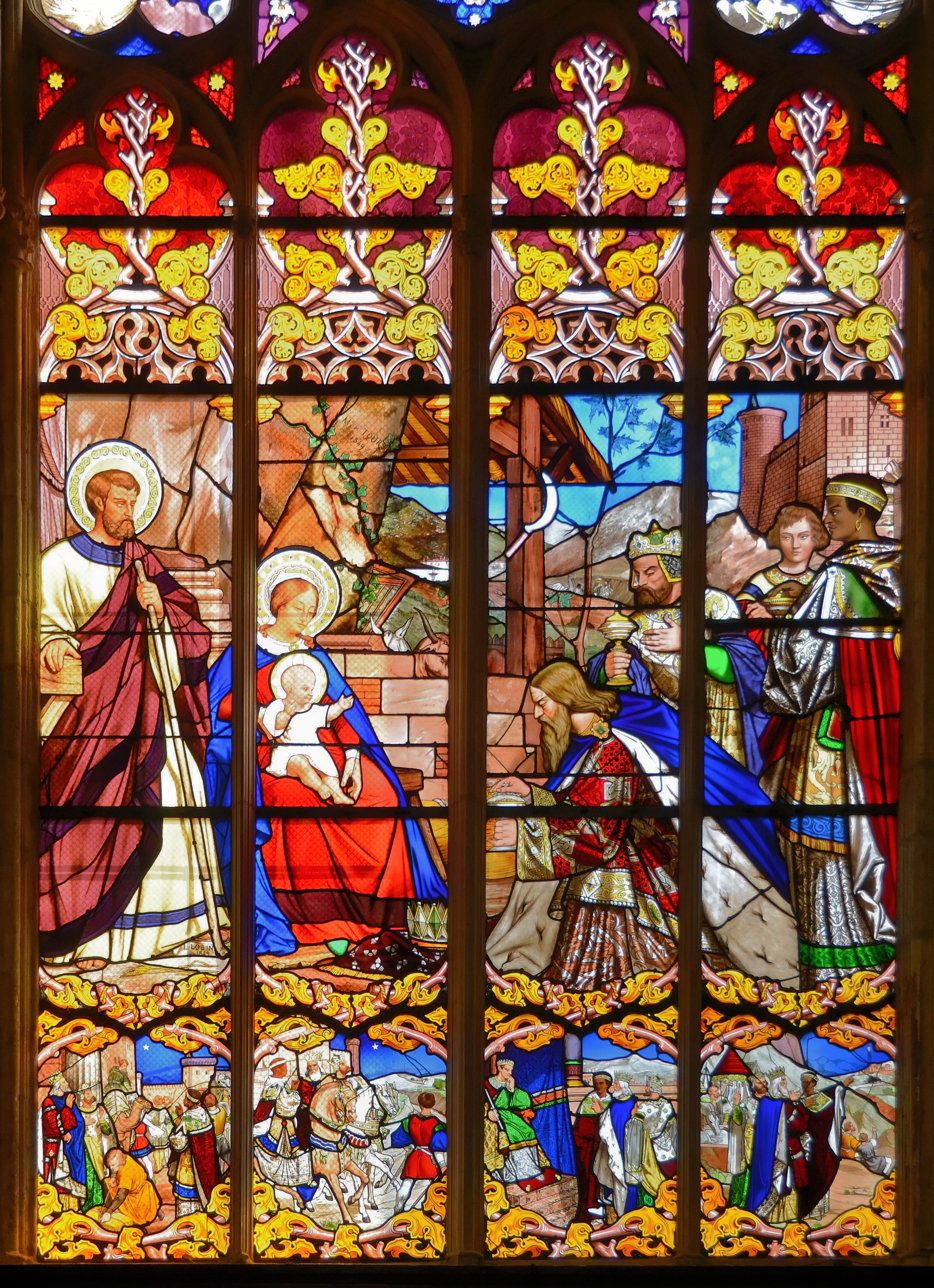
Renaissance panel of the Adoration of the Magi

== Stained glass ==
In the 13th century, artists working on the cathedral launched a small revolution in the design of stained glass windows. Instead of having the entire window filled with a multitude of small scenes made of tiny pieces of deeply-coloured glass, the artists began making windows with a mixture of types of glass; the traditional iconographic scenes with Biblical figures were surrounded by panes of clear or lightly coloured glass decorated with ornamental themes. This design served the purpose of bringing a much greater quantity of light into the interior, and also highlighted the chosen subjects otherwise lost among other images. This style of window, introduced at Tours around 1265, was soon followed at Troyes Cathedral, and then spread quickly to other cathedrals in France and later England.

This revolution in the display format was accompanied by an even more important revolution in technique with the use of silver stain, a method of painting onto glass with enamel paints before being heated and fused onto the surfaces. This allowed for more expressive and realistic figures, shading, and three-dimensional appearances. With these design implementations, the sizes of the panels became larger, and the amount of lead bars in the window became smaller.

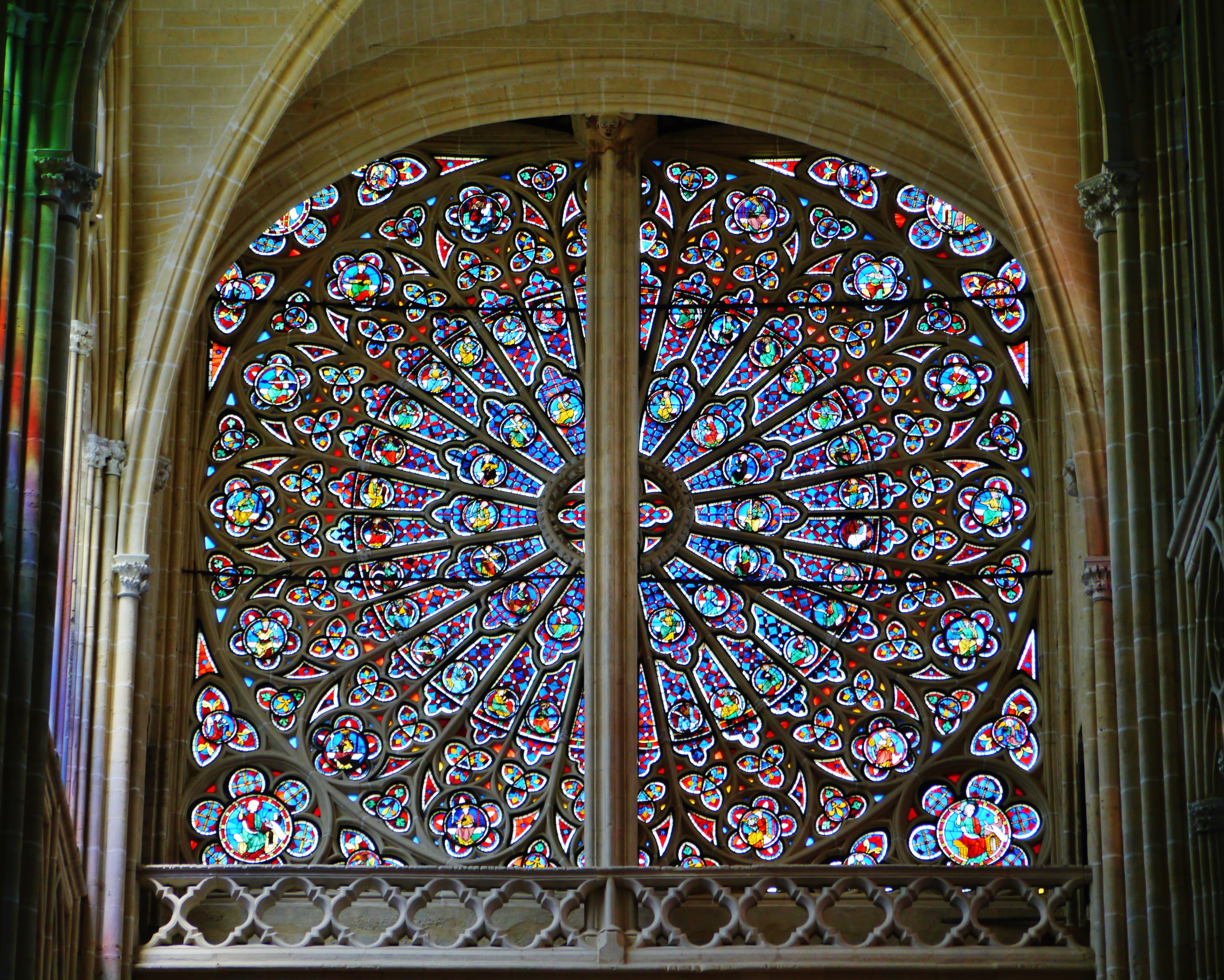
The north rose window, with its reinforcement bar

=== Rose windows ===
The cathedral has three rose windows in the west front and the two ends of the transept. The most original is that of the north transept, installed at the beginning of the 14th century. The rose was installed in a square section of window already filled with glass. When the rose was installed during the middle ages, problems of stability appeared, and it had to be reinforced by a vertical stone bar behind the window and by additional flying buttresses on the exterior.

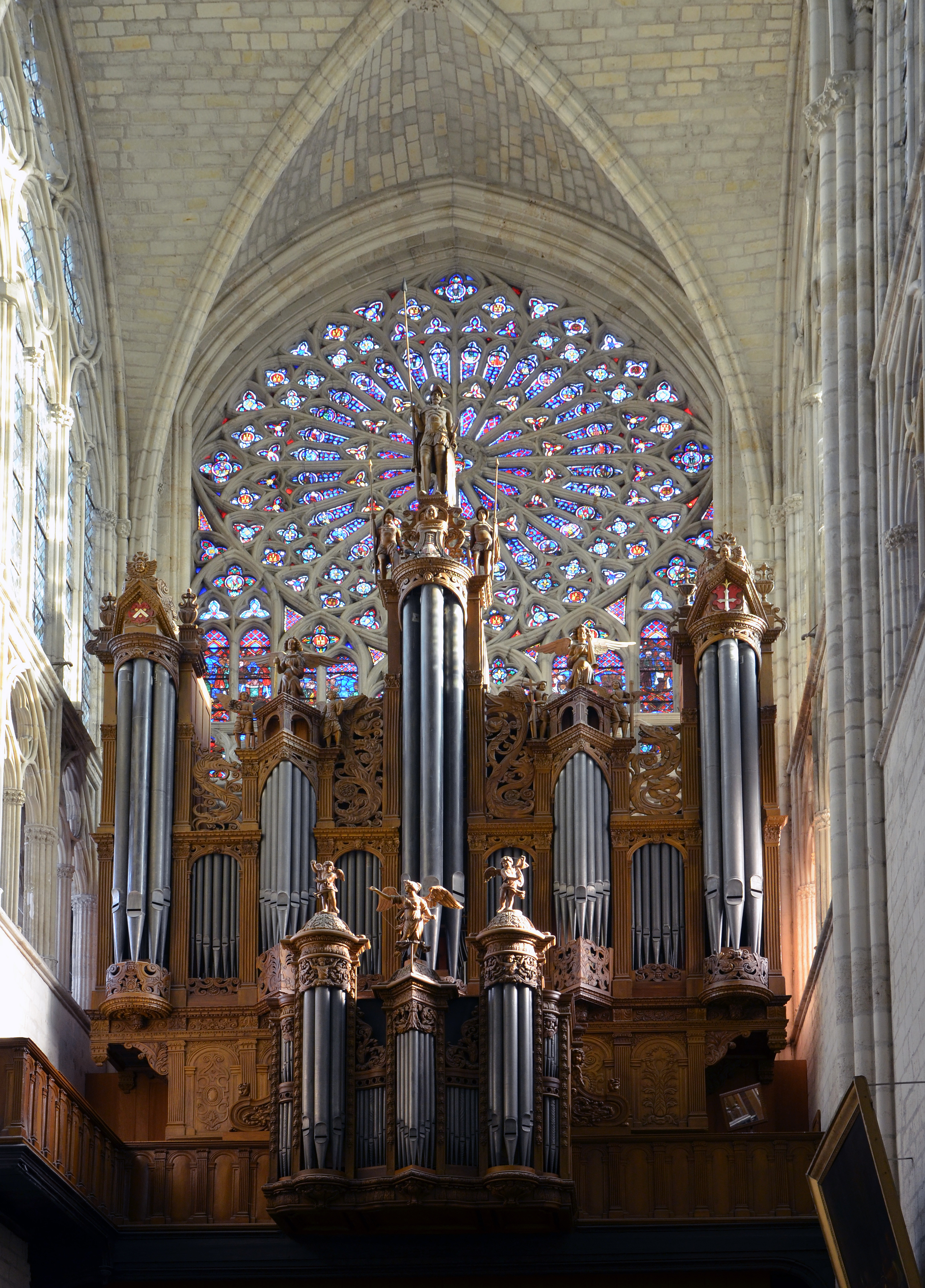
The cathedral organ with the south rose window

== Pipe organ ==
The pipe organ is located in the south transept. The case and decoration date to the 16th century and were built by Barnabé Delanoue. The instrument now in place was made in the 18th century by the family firm founded by Robert Clicquot.

== Bells ==
The cathedral has four major bells located in the south tower. The bourdon, the largest and deepest-sounding, is Christus, made in 1749 and weighing 1,850 kilograms. It originally hung in the nearby Abbey of St. Paul in Cormery. In 1793, during the Revolution, most church bells were seized and melted down to make cannon and other armament. Towns were allowed to have only a single bell to warn of a fire. The inhabitants of Coermery resisted and rolled the bell to another town to preserve it. Finally, in 1807, it was taken to Tours and installed in the tower.

The other three bells are:

Maurice (1350 kilos, 1864);
Gatien (980 kilos, 1884);
Maur (1250 kilos, 14th century).

== The Cloister of La Psalette and the Archbishop's Palace ==
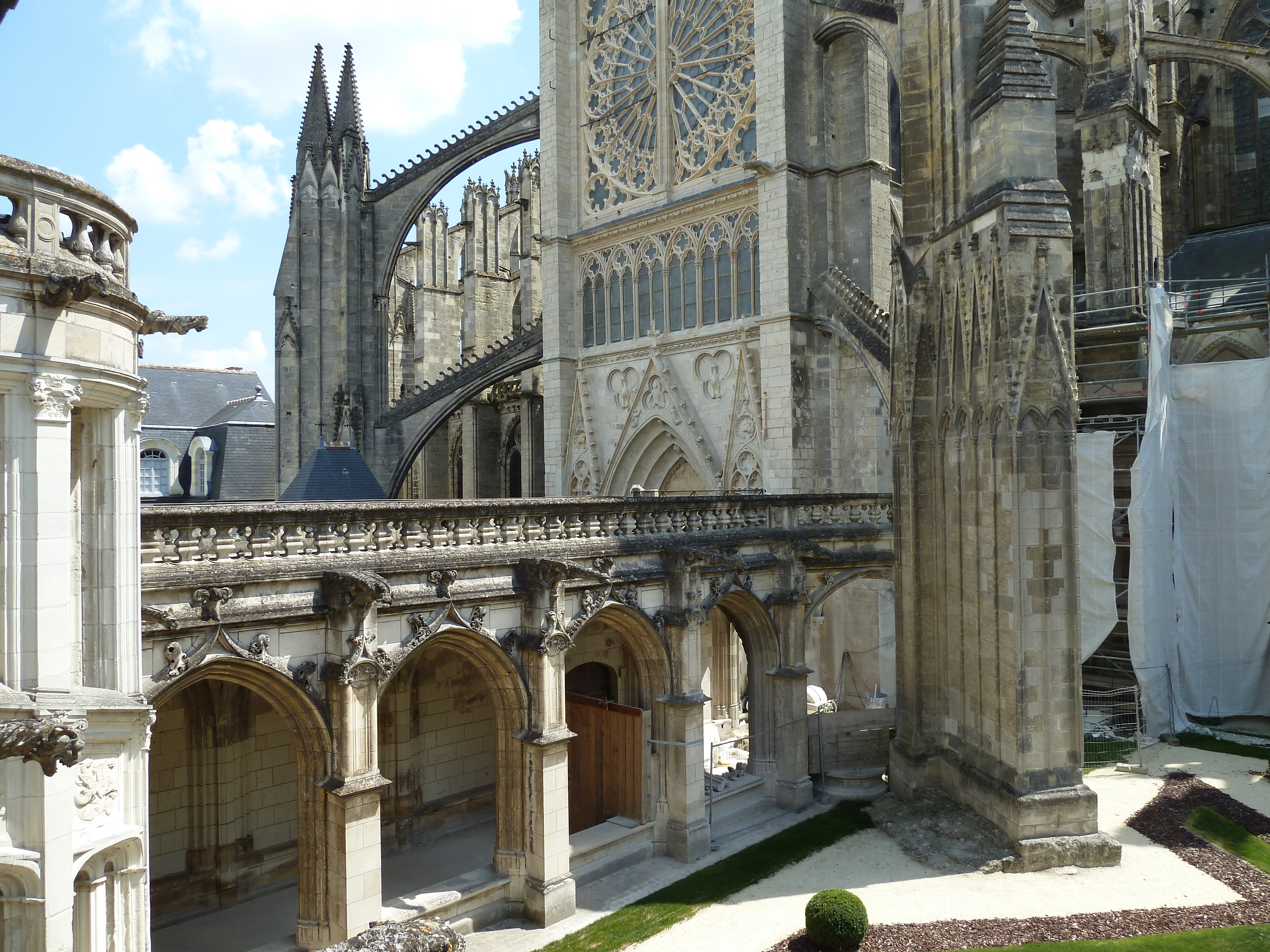
The Gothic-Renaissance Cloister of La Psalette, joined to the Cathedral

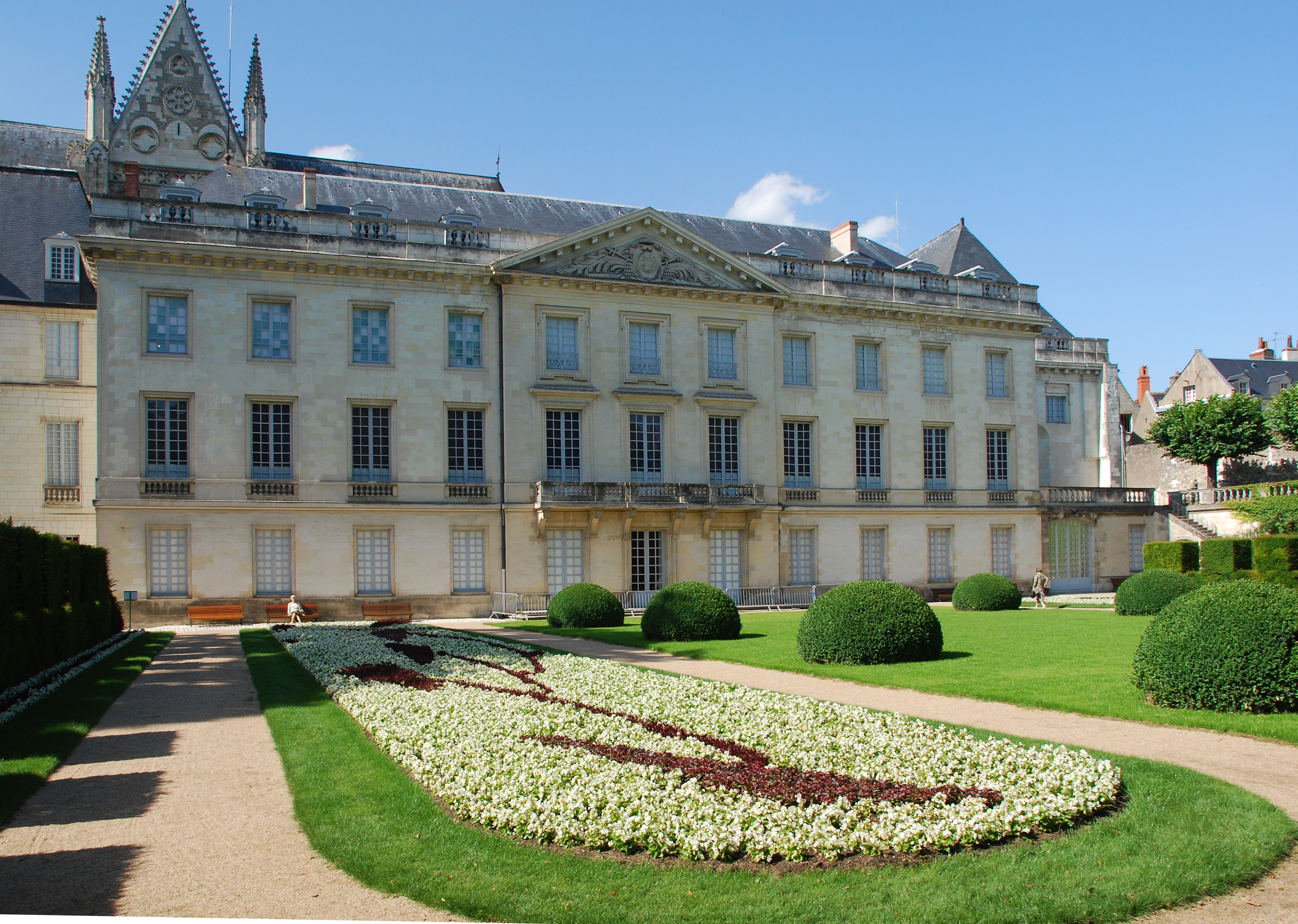
The former archbishop's palace, now the Museum of Fine Arts of Tours.

To the north of the cathedral is a small cloister, known as the cloître de la Psalette. It was built between 1442 and 1524 and has three galleries, placed against the north wall of the cathedral. It also has a scriptorium, where manuscripts were created, which was built in 1520, and is served by a stairway; and a library with a vaulted ceiling, where several frescoes from the 13th and 14th centuries can be seen. This was an early appearance of the French Renaissance style, which had recently been introduced in the stairway the Chateau of Blois in the nearby Loire Valley.

To the south of the cathedral is the former archbishop's palace, built in the early 18th century, which has now become the Musée des Beaux-Arts de Tours. It also was originally built against the Galo-Roman city wall of the 4th century. It contains one hall from the 11th century, and another from the 12th century. On the wall of the second hall is a balcony from which the judgements of the ecclesiastical court were announced.

== Burials ==
- Archibald Douglas, 4th Earl of Douglas, Duke of Touraine, buried with his son, Sir James Douglas in the Choir, following the Battle of Verneuil 1424.

== See also ==
- List of Gothic Cathedrals in Europe
- Pierre Camille Le Moine
- Arcis enclosure

== Bibliography ==
- Le Guide du Patrimoine en France (in French). Éditions du Patrimoine, Centre des Monuments Nationaux. 2002. ISBN 978-2-85822-760-0.
- Lours, Mathieu (2018). Dictionnaire des Cathédrales (in French). Éditions Jean-Paul Gisserot. ISBN 978-2755-807653.
- Brisac, Catherine (1994). Le Vitrail (in French). Éditions de La Martinière. ISBN 2-73-242117-0.
