= Roman Catholic Diocese of Venafro =

The Diocese of Venafro was a Roman Catholic diocese in Italy, located in Venafro, province of Isernia, region of Molise in the ecclesiastical province of Capua. In 1852, the dioceses of Isernia and Venafro were united under the governance of one and the same bishop, aeque personaliter. The diocese of Venafro was permanently suppressed on 30 September 1986.

== History ==
On 17 October 1032, Gerardus was consecrated bishop of Isernia at the request of the clergy of Isernia by Archbishop Adenulphus of Capua. The archbishop delineated the borders of the diocese as including the territory of the county of Isernia, the county of Venafro, and the County of Bovino.

In 1100, the Diocese of Venafro (Dioecesis Venafrensis) was established.

In 1621, the city of Venafro in the Terra Laboris had a population of c. 2000. The diocese was a suffragan of the Metropolitan archbishopric of Capua.

Bishop Matthias Joccia (1718–1733) opened the diocesan seminary in 1728.

On 27 June 1818, Pius VII issued the bull De Ulteriore, in which he reestablished the metropolitan archbishopric of Capua, and assigned as suffragan (subordinate) dioceses: Isernia, Calvi, Suessa, and Caserta. The diocese of Venafro was permanently suppressed, and united to the diocese of Isernia.

On 18 June 1852, in the bull "Sollicitudinem Animarum", Pope Pius IX the arrangement was changed. The diocese of Isernia and the revived diocese of Venafro were to be under the governance of one single bishop, aeque personaliter, to be called the diocese of Isernia e Venafro.

On 30 September 1986, Pope John Paul II ordered that the dioceses of Isernia and Venafro be merged into full union as one diocese with one bishop, with the Latin title Dioecesis Aeserniensis-Venafrensis. The seat of the diocese was to be in Isernia, and the cathedral of Isernia was to serve as the cathedral of the merged diocese. The cathedral in Venafro was to become a co-cathedral, and its cathedral Chapter was to be a Capitulum Concathedralis. There was to be only one diocesan Tribunal, in Isernia, and likewise one seminary, one College of Consultors, and one Priests' Council. The territory of the new diocese was to include the territory of the suppressed diocese of Venafro.

== Bishops of Venafro ==
- Constantinus (499)

...
Sede vacante (591)
Sede vacante (595)
...

- Rainaldus (15 February 1252 – ? )
- Joannes
- Andreas
- Jordanus

Romanus, O.S.B. Vallomb.

- Docibilis
- Peregrinus, O.S.A.
- Sparanus
- Petrus
- Joannes Grocei (6 September 1328 – 1348)
- Pietro Bossiano, O.P. (24 June 1348 – 1366)
- Guido (11 August 1366 – ? )
- Petrus (1387/1388)
- Carlo (Carlotus) Archamono (8 Jul 1388 – 23 Mar 1422 Appointed, Bishop of Bitetto)
- Nicolaus (1387 – 1396)
- Rogerius de Castro Petrae (14 July 1396 – 1399)
- Andrea Fiascone de Prata (6 October 1399 – 1426)
- Antonius Mancini (18 December 1426 – 1465)
- Giovanni Gatula (2 October 1465 – 1472)
- Angelo Alberto (17 Aug 1472 – 1504 Died)
- Ricomanni Buffalini (2 Oct 1504 – 1528 Died)

Cardinal Girolamo Grimaldi) (1528 – 1536) Apostolic Administrator

- Bernardino de Soria, O.F.M. (1536 – 1548)
- Giambattista Caracciolo Pisquizi (22 Mar 1548 – 1557 Died)
- Giovanni Antonio Carafa (1557 – 1558)
- Andrea Matteo Acquaviva d'Aragona (1558 – 1573)
- Orazio Caracciolo (16 Sep 1573 – 1581)
- Ladislao d'Aquino (20 Oct 1581 – 12 Feb 1621)
- Ottavio Orsini (1621 – 1632)
- Vincenzo Martinelli, O.P. (20 Sep 1632 – 10 Sep 1635 Died)
- Giacinto Cordella (1 Oct 1635 – 15 Dec 1666)
- Sebastiano Leopardi (16 Mar 1667 – 2 Jul 1669 Died)
- Ludovico Ciogni (1 Sep 1669 – 6 Aug 1690 Died)
- Carlo Nicola de Massa (11 Dec 1690 – 23 Mar 1710 Died)
- Mattia Joccia (11 May 1718 – 19 Jan 1733 Died)
- Francesco Agnello Fragianni (11 May 1733 – 28 Feb 1742 Appointed, Bishop of Calvi Risorta)
- Giuseppe Francesco Rossi (24 Sep 1742 – 27 Jan 1754 Died)
- Francesco Saverio Stabile (20 May 1754 – 1 Dec 1788 Died)
- Donato de’ Liguori (26 Mar 1792 – 27 Jan 1811 Died)

Sede vacante (1811 – 1818)

The diocese of Venafro was suppressed by Pope Pius VII on 27 June 1818.

The list continues at the Diocese of Isernia e Venafro.

== Books ==
- Cappelletti, Giuseppe (1866). Le chiese d'Italia Tomo vigesimo (20). Venezia: Giuseppe Antonelli, pp. 138–160. Retrieved: 2016-10-26.
- Cotugno, Gabriele (1824). Memorie istoriche di Venafro. (in Italian). Napoli: stamperia della Società filomatica, 1824. [Annotated list of bishops, pp. 146-171]
- Eubel, Conradus, ed. (1913). Hierarchia catholica, Tomus 1 (second ed.). Münster: Libreria Regensbergiana. (in Latin)
- Eubel, Conradus, ed. (1914). Hierarchia catholica, Tomus 2 (second ed.). Münster: Libreria Regensbergiana.
- Eubel, Conradus; Gulik, Guilelmus (1923). Hierarchia catholica, Tomus 3 (second ed.). Münster: Libreria Regensbergiana.
- Gams, Pius Bonifatius (1873). Series episcoporum Ecclesiae catholicae: quotquot innotuerunt a beato Petro apostolo (in Latin). Ratisbon: Typis et Sumptibus Georgii Josephi Manz.
- Gauchat, Patritius (Patrice) (1935). Hierarchia catholica IV (1592-1667). Münster: Libraria Regensbergiana.
- Ritzler, Remigius; Sefrin, Pirminus (1952). Hierarchia catholica medii et recentis aevi V (1667-1730). Patavii: Messagero di S. Antonio.
- Ritzler, Remigius; Sefrin, Pirminus (1958). Hierarchia catholica medii et recentis aevi VI (1730-1799). Patavii: Messagero di S. Antonio.
- Ughelli, Ferdinando; Coleti, Niccolò (1719). Italia sacra sive De episcopis Italiæ, et insularum adjacentium (in Latin). Vol. Tomus quartus (4). Venice: apud Sebastianum Coleti.
