= Giuliano de' Medici (bishop) =

Most Reverend Giuliano de' Medici
- Archbishop of Pisa
- Church: Catholic Church
- Archdiocese: Archdiocese of Pisa
- In office: 1620–1636
- Predecessor: Franciscus Boncianni
- Successor: Scipione Pannocchieschi d'Elci

Orders
- Consecration: 21 June 1620 by Roberto Ubaldini

Personal details
- Died: 6 January 1636 Pisa, Italy

Giuliano de' Medici (died 1635) was a Roman Catholic prelate who served as Archbishop of Pisa (1620–1636).

== Biography ==
On 15 June 1620, Giuliano de' Medici was appointed during the papacy of Pope Paul V as Archbishop of Pisa. On 21 June 1620, he was consecrated bishop by Roberto Ubaldini, Bishop of Montepulciano, with Francesco Sacrati, Titular Archbishop of Damascus, and Marsilio Peruzzi, Archbishop of Chieti, serving as co-consecrators. He served as Archbishop of Pisa until his death on 6 January 1636.

== External links and additional sources ==
- Cheney, David M. "Archdiocese of Pisa". Catholic-Hierarchy.org. (for Chronology of Bishops) ^{[self-published]}
- Chow, Gabriel. "Metropolitan Archdiocese of Pisa (Italy)". GCatholic.org. (for Chronology of Bishops) ^{[self-published]}

Catholic Church titles
Preceded by Franciscus Boncianni	Archbishop of Pisa; 1620–1635	Succeeded by Scipione Pannocchieschi d'Elci
