= Roman Catholic Diocese of Fondi =

The Diocese of Fondi or Diocese of Fundi (Latin: Dioecesis Fundana) was a Roman Catholic diocese located in the town of Fondi in the province of Latina, Lazio, central Italy. In 1818, it was suppressed to the Diocese of Gaeta. It was restored as a Titular Episcopal See in 1968.

== Ordinaries ==
=== Diocese of Fondi ===
Erected: 237
Metropolitan: Archdiocese of Capua

- Nicola Colafacio (de Faciis) (1445–1476 Died)
- Pietro Gaetani (1476–1500 Died)
- Nicola Pellegrini (bishop) (1500–1520 Died)
- Giacomo Pellegrini (1520–1537 Resigned)
- Giovanni Angelo Pellegrini (1537–1552 Appointed, Bishop of Gravina di Puglia)
- Fausto Caffarelli (1555–1566 Died)
- Matteo Andrea Guerra (1567–1576 Appointed, Bishop of San Marco)
- Pio Loterio, O.S.B. (1576–1591 Died)
- Giovanni Battista Comparini (1591–1616 Died)
- Lelio Veterano (1616–1619 Died)
- Giovanni Agostino Gandolfo (1619–1635 Appointed, Bishop of Sant'Agata de' Goti)
- Maurizio Ragano (1636–1640 Died)
- Pietro Paolo Pinto, O.F.M. Conv. (1640–1661 Died)
- Simone Oliverio (1662–1668 Died)
- Filippo Alferio Ossorio (1669–1693 Died)
- Matteo Gagliani (1693–1703 Appointed, Bishop of Sora)
- Vittore Felice Conci (1703–1715 Died)
- Conus Luchini dal Verme (1719–1720 Appointed, Bishop of Ostuni)
- Antonio Carrara (1721–1757 Died)
- Onofrio de Rossi (1757–1764 Appointed, Bishop of Ischia)
- Giovanni Calcagnini (1764–1775 Died)
- Raffaele Tosti (1776–1781 Died)
- Gennaro Vincenzo Tortora (1792–1814 Died)

1818: Suppressed to the Diocese of Gaeta

== See also ==
- Catholic Church in Italy
