= Farrell (surname) =

Farrell is a surname of Irish origin. It is an anglicised form of the Gaelic patronym Ó Fearghail. The Ó Fearghail were the Princes of Annaly (modern-day County Longford) for 6 centuries.

== People surnamed Farrell ==
=== In music and ballet ===
- Angela Farrell, Irish singer
- Bernadette Farrell, English composer
- Ciarán Farrell, Irish composer
- Bobby Farrell (1949–2010), Dutch DJ
- Daoirí Farrell, Irish singer
- Dave Farrell, American musician
- Eibhlis Farrell, Irish composer
- Eileen Farrell, American soprano
- Gail Farrell, American singer
- Joe Farrell, American saxophonist
- Niamh Farrell, Irish singer
- Perry Farrell, American musician
- Richard Ray Farrell (born 1956), American blues musician and songwriter
- Suzanne Farrell, American ballerina

=== In sports and games ===
==== American football ====
- Dillon Farrell, American footballer
- Luke Farrell (American football) (born 1997), American football player
- Neil Farrell Jr. (born 1998), American football player

==== Baseball ====
- Frank J. Farrell, Yankees owner
- Joe Farrell (baseball) (1857–1893), American baseball player
- Kerby Farrell (1913–1975), American baseball player and manager
- Luke Farrell (baseball) (born 1991), American baseball player
- Turk Farrell (1934–1977), American baseball player

==== Football (soccer) ====
- Andrew Farrell (soccer) (born 1992), American footballer
- Andy Farrell (footballer) (born 1965), English footballer
- Craig Farrell (footballer) (1982–2022), English footballer
- Damien Farrell, Antiguan footballer
- Dessie Farrell, Irish footballer
- Greg Farrell, Scottish footballer
- Joe Farrell (soccer) (born 1994), American soccer player
- Kyron Farrell, English footballer
- Maurice Farrell (born 1969), Irish footballer

==== Rugby ====
- Andy Farrell (born 1975), English former league then union player, now a manager
- Frank Farrell (rugby league), Australian, played for Newtown, NSW and Australia
- Hec Farrell, Australian rugby league player, played for Western Suburbs
- Owen Farrell, English rugby union player, plays for Saracens and England

==== Other sports and games ====
- Brian Farrell (lacrosse), American lacrosse player
- James Michael Farrell, Australian businessman, councilor, pioneer of horse racing sport in Fremantle
- John Farrell (speed skating), American skater
- Johnny Farrell, American golfer
- Kane Farrell, Australian football player (AFL)
- Mary Jane Farell, American bridge player
- Renita Farrell, Australian field hockey player
- Dan Farrell, Canadian ice hockey player

=== In literature ===
- Brian Farrell (broadcaster), Irish broadcaster
- Henry Farrell, American author
- J. G. Farrell (1935–1979), Irish author
- James T. Farrell, American author
- John Farrell (poet), American poet
- John Farrell (Australian poet), Australian poet
- Kathleen Farrell, British author
- Warren Farrell, American author

=== In television and film ===
- Mark Farrell, Canadian comedian
- Charles Farrell (1901–1990), American actor
- Colin Farrell, Irish actor
- Glenda Farrell, American actress
- Graham Farrell (born 1967), British criminologist
- Gwen Farrell, American actress and boxing referee
- Judy Farrell, American actress
- Mike Farrell, American actor
- Nicholas Farrell, British actor
- Paul Farrell (1893–1975), Irish actor
- Stephen Farrell (journalist), journalist
- Terry Farrell (actress) (born 1963), American actress
- Timothy Farrell (1922-1989), American actor
- Tommy Farrell, American actor

=== In the military ===
- Conway Farrell (1898–1988), Canadian pilot
- John Farrell (VC) (1826–1865), Irish soldier
- Lisagh Farrell, English soldier
- Thomas Francis Farrell (1891–1967), American general
- Sir William Farrell-Skeffington, 1st Baronet (1742–1815), English soldier

=== In politics ===
- Casey Farrell, Australian politician
- Craig Farrell (politician), Australian politician
- Daniel F. Farrell (c. 1869 – 1939), New York politician
- Don Farrell (born 1954), Australian politician
- Druh Farrell (born 1958 or 1959), Canadian municipal politician
- Edelmiro Julián Farrell, President of Argentina
- Henry Farrell (political scientist), American professor
- Herman D. Farrell Jr. (1932–2018), New York politician
- Peggy Farrell (politician) (1920–2003), Irish politician
- Robert C. Farrell, American politician
- Terry Farrell (politician), Canadian politician
- Willie Farrell (1928–2010), Irish politician
- Michael Farrell, Irish civil rights activist

=== In other fields ===
- Brian D. Farrell, American curator
- Brian Farrell (bishop), American bishop
- Kathleen Farrell (judge), Australian judge
- Kevin Farrell (born 1947), American cardinal
- Leone N. Farrell (1904–1986), Canadian biologist
- Mairéad Farrell (IRA activist) (1957–1988), IRA soldier
- Michael James Farrell (1926–1975), English economist
- Paul T. Farrell, American judge
- Red Rocks Farrell, American criminal
- Sinéad Farrell, British-American scientist
- Tami Farrell, American actress
- Sir Terry Farrell (1938–2025), British architect and urban designer
- Sir Thomas Farrell, Irish sculptor
- Thomas J. Farrell, American historian
- William Farrell (architect) (died 1851), Irish architect
- Yvonne Farrell, Irish architect

== Fictional characters ==
- Caroline Farrell ("Echo"), protagonist of Dollhouse (TV series)
- Jamey Farrell, character in 24 (TV series)
- Kat Farrell, character in the Marvel Universe
- Rosa Farrell, character in Final Fantasy IV
- Erica and Heather Farrell, twins from Degrassi
- Shawn Farrell, character in The 4400
- Matt Farrell, character in Live Free or Die Hard
- Captain Farrell, character in the traditional Irish song "Whiskey in the Jar"
- Patty Farrell, character from the Diary of a Wimpy Kid franchise

== See also ==
- Ó Fearghail
- O'Farrell
- Ferrel
- Ferrell
- Farrall
