= Thomas Flynn =

Thomas, Tom or Tommy Flynn may refer to:

== Religion ==
- Thomas Flynn (bishop of Ardagh) (died 1730), Irish Roman Catholic bishop
- Thomas Flynn (bishop of Lancaster) (1880–1961), English Roman Catholic bishop
- Thomas Flynn (Columban priest) (1908–1950), Irish missionary priest
- Thomas Flynn (bishop of Achonry) (1931–2015), Irish Roman Catholic bishop

== Sports ==
- Tom Flynn (umpire) (died 1931), Australian cricket umpire
- Tommy Flynn, rugby league footballer of the 1930s for Wales, and Warrington
- Tom Flynn (American football) (born 1962), American football player
- Thomas Flynn (English footballer) (born 1990), English football goalkeeper
- Tom Flynn (Gaelic footballer) (born 1992), inter-county Gaelic footballer for Galway

== Others ==
- Thomas Flynn (actor) (fl. 1834), English actor and manager of the Bowery Theater
- Thomas Flynn (VC) (1842–1892), Victoria Cross recipient
- Thomas J. Flynn (born 1930), United States Army general
- Thomas R. Flynn (born 1936), American philosopher
- R. Thomas Flynn (born 1938), American academic administrator
- Tom Flynn (author) (1955–2021), American skeptic, author and journal editor
- Tom Flynn, founder of punk band Fang
