= Ferrell (disambiguation) =

Ferrell is an English surname of Irish origin.

Ferrell may also refer to:

- Ferrell, New Jersey
- Ferrell, West Virginia
- Ferrell Center, an arena in Waco, Texas
- Ferrellgas, an American supplier of propane based in Kansas and Missouri

== See also ==
- Ferrel (disambiguation)
