= Thomas Farrell =

Thomas or Tom Farrell may refer to:

- Thomas Farrell (general) (1891–1967), Deputy Commanding General of the Manhattan Project
- Tom Farrell (hurdler) (born 1932), British hurdler and middle-distance runner
- Tom Farrell (middle-distance runner) (born 1944), American middle-distance runner
- Tom Farrell (long-distance runner) (born 1991), British long-distance runner
- Tom Farrell (rugby union) (born 1993), Irish rugby union player
- Tom Farrell (Gimme Gimme Gimme), a fictional TV comedy character
- Tommy Farrell (1921–2004), American actor
- Tommy Farrell (footballer, born 1937) (1937–2012), former Irish football player
- Tommy Farrell (footballer, born 1887) (1887–1916), English footballer
- Thomas Richard Farrell (1926–1958), New Zealand pianist
- Thomas Joseph Farrell (1847–1913), Member of Parliament for South Kerry 1895–1900
- Thomas Farrell (sculptor) (1827–1900), Irish sculptor
- Tom Farrell (Canadian politician) (1924–2012)
- Thomas J. Farrell (medievalist), American medievalist
- F. Thomas Farrell (born 1941), American mathematician

== See also ==
- O'Farrell, surname
