= O'Ferrall =

O'Ferrall may refer to:

- Basil O'Ferrall (1924–2006), CB, MA, an eminent Anglican priest in the second half of the 20th century
- Charles Triplett O'Ferrall (1840–1905), Virginian politician who served as a U.S. representative
- Ernest O'Ferrall (1881–1925), popular Australian poet and short story writer
- George More O'Ferrall (1907–1982), British film and television director
- Griff O'Ferrall (born 2003), American baseball player
- Philip Bourchier O'Ferrall, the current senior vice-president of Viacom International Media Networks
- Rafael O'Ferrall (born 1954), United States Army officer, Deputy Commanding General for the Joint Task Force at Guantanamo Bay
- Richard More O'Ferrall (1797–1880), Irish politician
- Ronald O'Ferrall, the fourth Anglican Bishop of Madagascar from 1926 until 1940

== See also ==
- More O'Ferrall-Jencks plot, 2D plot of multiple reaction coordinate potential energy surfaces for chemical reactions involving simultaneous changes in two bonds
- Ferrell
- Ferrol (disambiguation)
- Verrall
