= Ferral (disambiguation) =

Ferral is a freguesia (civil parish) in the municipality of Montalegre, Vila Real District, Portugal.

Ferral may also refer to:

- Ferral C. Dininny (1818–1901), American businessman and politician in New York State

== See also ==
- Ferrals-les-Corbières, a commune in the Aude department, southern France
  - US Ferrals XIII, an amateur rugby league club based in Ferrals-les-Corbières
- Ferrals-les-Montagnes, a commune in the Hérault department, southern France
- Feral (disambiguation)
- Ferrol (disambiguation)
