= Farrall =

Farrall is an English surname. Notable people with the surname include:

- Alec Farrall (1936–2025), English footballer
- Thomas Farrall (1837–1894), Cumbrian teacher, author and agricultural authority

== See also ==
- Joseph Farrall Wright (1827–1883), a 19th-century Anglican priest, and founder of English football club Bolton Wanderers
- Joy Farrall Jones (born 1933), British painter and illustrator
- Farrell (surname), people with this name
