= Bishop of Ardagh =

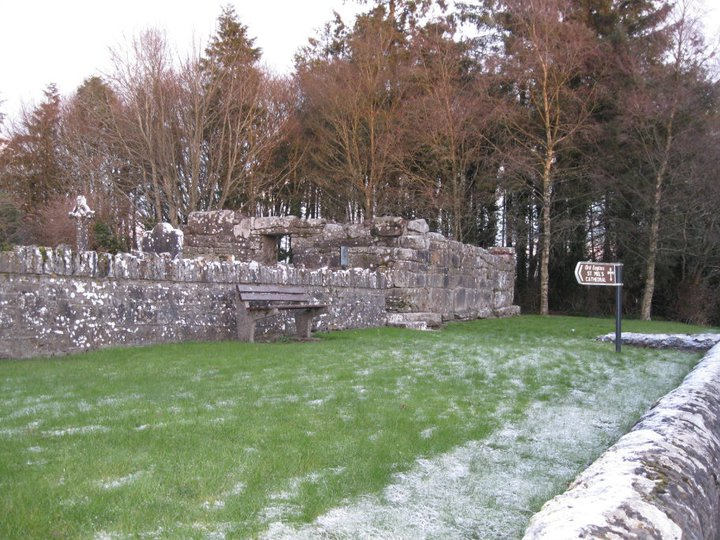
The church of Saint Mel

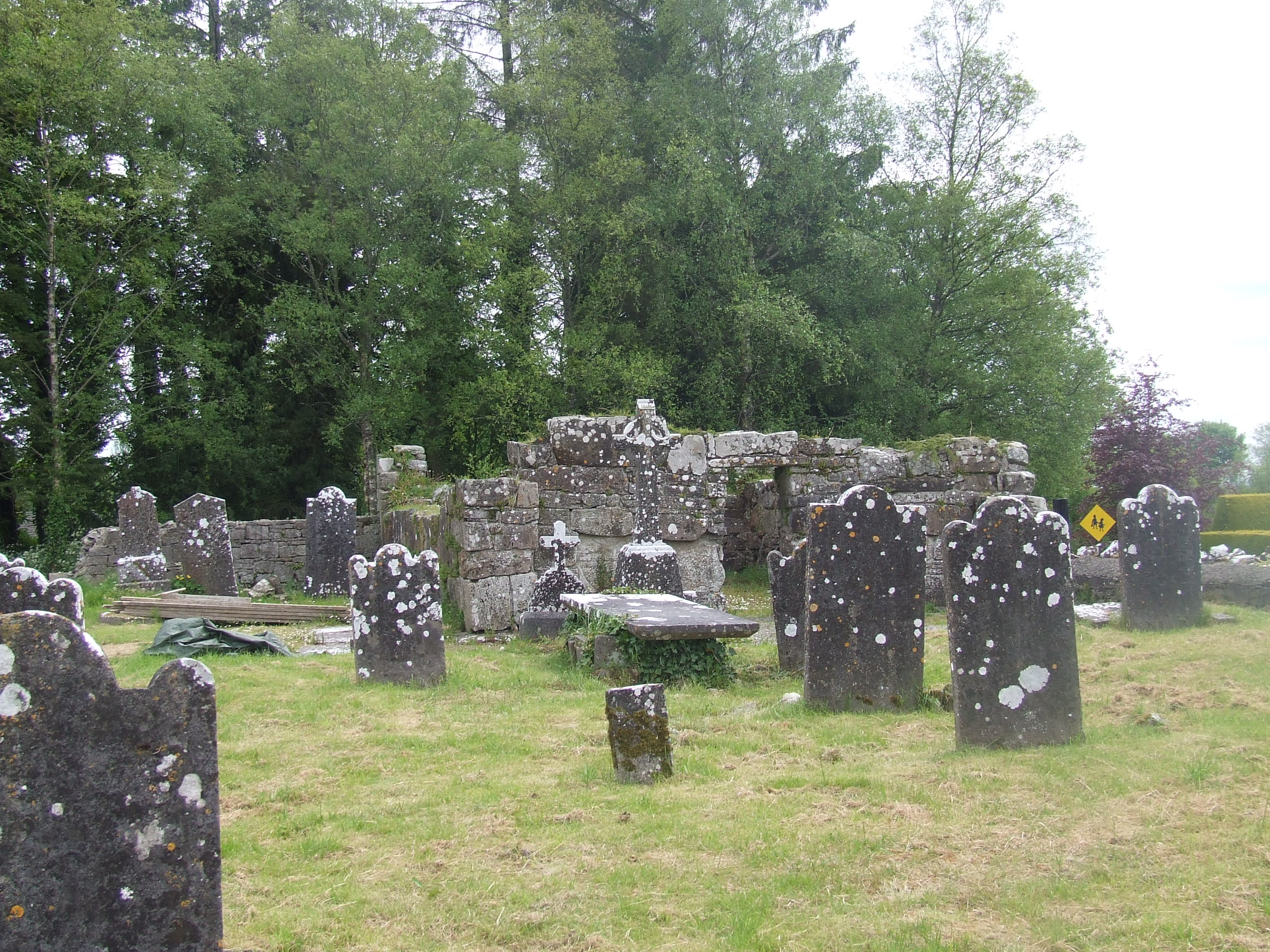
Church of St Mel, view across the graveyard. June 2013

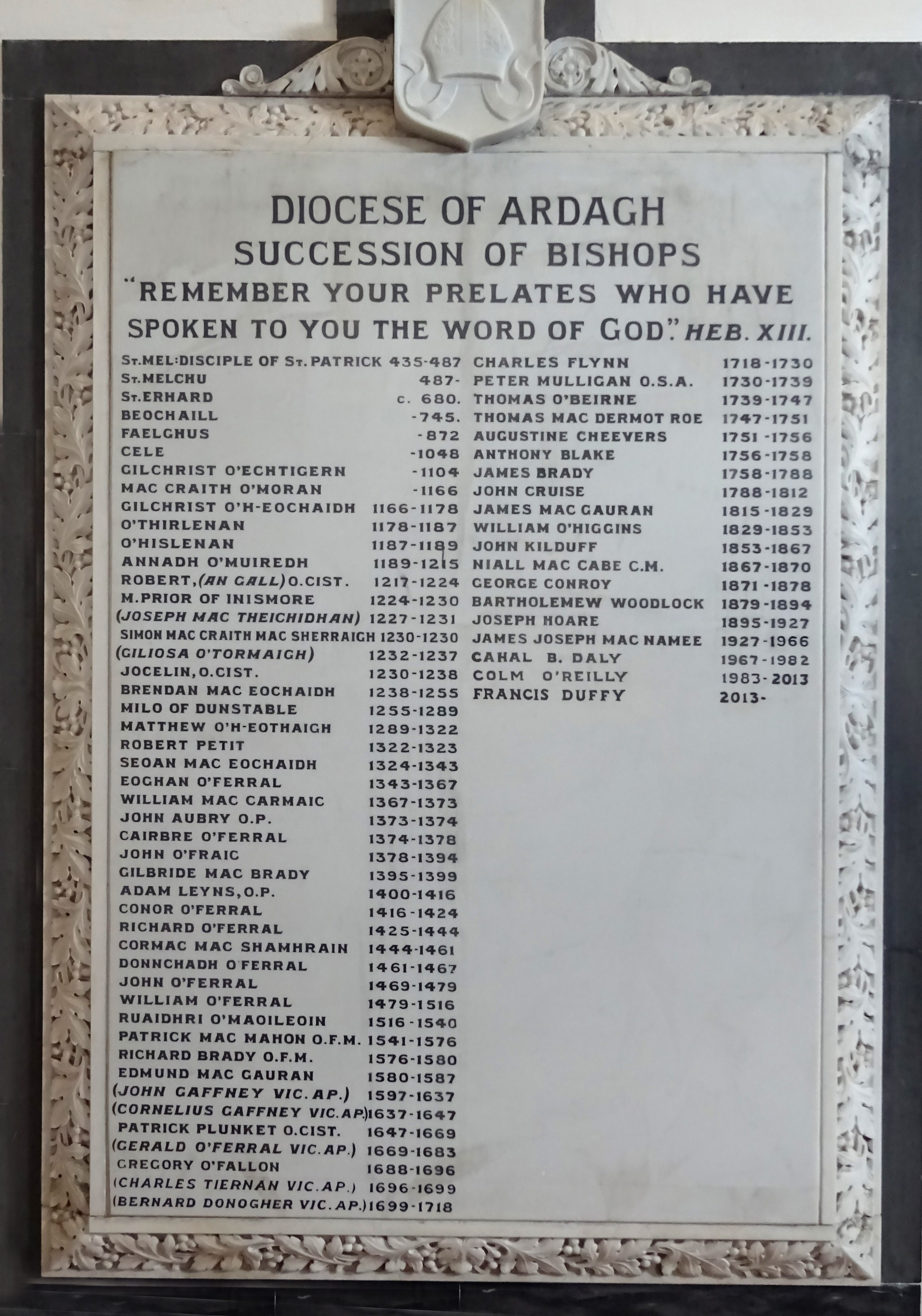
List of the Bishops of Ardagh in St Mel's Cathedral. This list gives the Catholic succession and includes Saint Mél, Melchu, Erhard of Regensburg, several abbots attested in medieval annals, and the Penal-era Vicars Apostolic.

The Bishop of Ardagh was a separate episcopal title which took its name after the village of Ardagh, County Longford in Ireland. It was used by the Roman Catholic Church until 1756, and intermittently by the Church of Ireland until 1839.

Tradition states that a monastery was founded at Ardagh by St Patrick, and that his nephew, St. Mel (died c.490), was its bishop or abbot. Although there is no historical or archaeological evidence to support it, Mel is regarded as the founder of the see.

The diocese of Ardagh was established in 1111 at the Synod of Rathbreasail as the see for east Connacht. At the subsequent Synod of Kells in 1152, its area was reduced to the territory of the Conmaicne.

Ardagh Cathedral was severely damaged by warfare in 1496 and was never restored. There are remains of an eighth- or ninth-century church at Ardagh, which is known as St. Mel's Cathedral, although it dates from three centuries after the saint's death, and predates the introduction of a diocesan system in Ireland.

Following the Reformation, there were parallel apostolic successions. In the Roman Catholic Church, the bishopric has been united with Clonmacnoise since 30 May 1756. Until the mid-19th century, the parish church of Ballymahon had served as a pro-cathedral for the Roman Catholic Diocese of Ardagh and Clonmacnoise. A new St Mel's Cathedral in Longford was built for the diocese between 1840 and 1856. The building was destroyed by fire in the early hours of Christmas Day 2009.

In the Church of Ireland, Ardagh was intermittently held with Kilmore between 1604 and 1633, 1661–1692 and 1693–1742, then held with Tuam 1742–1839. Ardagh was again united to Kilmore 1839–1841. Since 1841, Ardagh has been part of the bishopric of Kilmore, Elphin and Ardagh.

== Pre-Reformation bishops ==
Pre-Reformation Bishops of Ardagh
From	Until	Ordinary	Notes
bef.1152	1166	Mac Raith ua Móráin	Present at the Synod of Kells in March 1152; resigned in 1166; died 1168
bef.1172	1178	Gilla Crist Ua hEóthaig	Called "bishop of Conmaicne"; died in 1178; also known as Christianus
unknown	1188	Ua hÉislinnén	Called "bishop of Conmaicne"; died in office
unknown	1216	Annud Ua Muiredaig	Died in office; also known as Adam
1217	1224	Robert, O.Cist.	Abbot of St. Mary's Abbey, Dublin until became bishop in 1217; died on 27 May 1224
c.1224	c.1229	Simon Magraith	Prior of Inis Mór until became bishop c. 1224; died c. 1229; also known as MacBath or MacGeoffrey
1228	1230	Joseph Mac Teichthecháin	Elected 1227; consecrated c. 1228; died 1230; also known as Joseph Mac Eódaig ('Magoday')
c.1229	1230	Mac Raith Mac Serraig	Elected and consecrated c. 1229; died 1230
fl. c.1230		Thomas	
c.1232	1237	Gilla Ísu mac in Scélaige Ó Tormaid ^{[A]}	Elected and consecrated c. 1232; died in 1237; also known as Gelasius
c.1232	c.1237	Iocelinus, O.Cist. ^{[A]}	Elected and consecrated c. 1232; took control of temporalities on 1 March 1233; resigned before 1237
1238	1252	Brendán Mac Teichthecháin	Elected c. 1238; resigned on 15 October 1252; died in 1255; also known as Brendán Mac Eódaig ('Magoday')
1256	1288	Milo of Dunstable	Elected before 20 May 1256; temporalities on 13 January 1257; died on 23 October 1288
1290	1322	Matha Ó hEóthaig	Elected November 1289; fealty on 28 January 1290; temporalities on 8 April 1290; died in office; also known as Matthaeus
1323		(Robert Wirsop, O.E.S.A.)	Appointed on 5 April 1323, but did not get possession of the see; translated to Connor on 20 June 1323
1324	1343	Seoán Mág Eóaigh	Elected before March and consecrated before 12 May 1324; died in office; also recorded as John Magee
1347	1367	Eóghan alias Maolsheachlainn Ó Fearghail	Elected c. 1344; consecrated c. 1347; died in office
1368	1373	Uilliam Mac Carmaic	Elected c. 1368; died, by a fall from his horse, before August 1373; also recorded as William MacCarmaic
1373	1378	Cairbre Ó Fearghail ^{[B]}	Elected before September 1373; died in 1378
1373	unknown	John Aubrey, O.P. ^{[B]}	Elected before September 1373; appointed on 29 April 1374
1392		(Henry Nony, O.P.)	Appointed on 29 April 1392, but did not get possession of the see; acted as a suffragan bishop in the dioceses of Exeter 1396–99, and Bath & Wells 1400; died after 1400
1395	1400	Comedinus Mac Brádaigh	Appointed on 20 October 1395 and consecrated after 19 August 1396; died before February 1400; also known as Gilbert MacBrady
1400	1416	Adam Leyns, O.P.	Appointed on 15 February 1400; died June 1416
1416	1423	Conchobhar Ó Fearghail	Elected after June 1416; appointed on 17 February 1418; consecrated on 3 February 1419; died in 1423
1425	1444	Risdeárd Ó Fearghail, O.Cist.	Elected before January 1425; appointed on 11 January 1425; consecrated after 25 May 1425; died c. June 1444
1444	1445	(Mac Muircheartaigh)	Elected in 1444, but not consecrated; resigned in 1455; also known as MacMurtry
1445	c.1462	Cormac Mác Shamhradháin, O.S.A.	Appointed on 6 November 1444; consecrated after 19 February 1445; resigned c. 1462
1462		Seaán Ó Fearghail ^{[C]}	Appointed on 30 July, but blocked on 26 November 1462
1467	1469	Donatus Ó Fearghail	Appointed on 12 October 1467; died before 28 July 1469
1467	1479	Seaán Ó Fearghail (again)	Appointed (again) on 28 July 1469; died before 1479
1482	1516	Uilliam Ó Fearghail, O.Cist.	Appointed on 4 August 1480 and consecrated on 11 August 1482; died in 1516

== Bishops during the Reformation ==
Bishops of Ardagh during the Reformation
From	Until	Ordinary	Notes
1517	1540	Rory O'Malone	Known in Irish as Ruaidhrí Ó Máel Eóin; appointed by Pope Leo X on 14 December 1517; not known if he acknowledged Royal supremacy; died in 1540
1541	1553	Richard Ó Fearghail	Nominated by King Henry VIII on 2 May 1541 and consecrated on 22 April 1542; died 1553
1541/53	c.1572/75	Patrick MacMahon, O.F.M.	Appointed by Pope Paul III on 14 November 1541 in opposition to Ó Fearghail; recognised sole bishop in 1553 when Ireland restored Papal supremacy in the reign of Queen Mary I, but after the accession of Queen Elizabeth I his position is uncertain; died c. 1572 or 1575

== Post-Reformation bishops ==
=== Church of Ireland succession ===
Church of Ireland Bishops of Ardagh
From	Until	Ordinary	Notes
1572		(John Garvey)	Nominated on 6 November 1572, but never consecrated; later became Bishop of Kilmore in 1585, and Archbishop of Armagh in 1589
1572	1583	See vacant	
1583	1601	Lysach Ó Fearghail	Nominated on 4 November 1583; died before 26 April 1601
1604	1633	See part of the united bishopric of Kilmore and Ardagh	
1633	1654	John Richardson, D.D.	Nominated on 8 April and consecrated in September 1633; also was Archdeacon of Derry 1622–34, then Archdeacon of Down 1639–54; left Ireland before the Rebellion of 1641; died in London on 11 August 1654
1654	1661	See vacant	
1661	1692	See part of the united bishopric of Kilmore and Ardagh	
1692		Ulysses Burgh, D.D.	Previously Dean of Emly Cathedral; nominated bishop of Ardagh on 7 April and appointed by letters patent on 8 September 1692; consecrated at Christ Church Cathedral, Dublin on 11 September 1692; died later in the same year
1693	1742	See part of the united bishopric of Kilmore and Ardagh	
1742	1839	See part of the Anglican archbishopric of Tuam	
1839	1841	See part of the united bishopric of Kilmore and Ardagh	
since 1841		See part of the united bishopric of Kilmore, Elphin and Ardagh.	

=== Roman Catholic succession ===
Roman Catholic Bishops of Ardagh
From	Until	Ordinary	Notes
c.1572/75	1576	See vacant	
1576	1580	Richard Brady, O.F.M.	Appointed on 23 January 1576; translated to Kilmore on 9 March 1580
1581	1587	Edmund MacGauran	Appointed on 11 September 1581; translated to Armagh on 1 July 1587
1580	1622	See vacant	
1622	c.1637	(John Gaffney)	Appointed Vicar Apostolic of Ardagh by papal brief 14 January 1622; died c. 1637
1637	unknown	(Cornelius Gaffney)	Named Vicar General, but no record of a papal brief appointing him Vicar Apostolic; remained as vicar general during the episcopate of Patrick Plunket
1647	1669	Patrick Plunkett, O.Cist.	Appointed on 11 March 1647; consecrated in March 1648; left Ireland c. 1652 and did not return until 1664; translated to Meath on 11 January 1669
1669	1683	(Gerard Farrell)	Appointed Vicar Apostolic of Ardagh by papal brief on 31 July 1669; died in June 1683
1688	unknown	(Gregory Fallon)	Appointed Apostolic Administrator of Ardagh and Bishop of Clonmacnoise; proposed on 17 May 1688; appointed by papal brief on 1 July 1697; died c. 1698
1696	unknown	(Charles Tiernan)	Appointed Vicar Apostolic of Ardagh by papal brief on 6 July 1696
1699	unknown	(Bernard Donogher)	Appointed Vicar Apostolic of Ardagh by papal brief on 20 August 1699
1709	1711	(Ambrose O'Conor O.P.)	Appointed Vicar Apostolic of Ardagh; proposed on 16 June 1709, but never consecrated; died on 20 February 1711
1718	1730	Thomas Flynn	Appointed on 18 May 1718; consecrated on 15 July 1718; died on 29 January 1730
1730	1739	Peter Mulligan, O.E.S.A.	Appointed in September 1730; papal brief on 9 May 1732; died on 23 July 1739
1739	1747	Thomas O'Beirne	Appointed on 19 September 1739; died in February 1747
1747	1751	Thomas MacDermot Roe	Appointed on 8 May 1747; died in February 1751
1751	1756	Augustine Cheevers, O.S.A.	Appointed on 17 July 1751; translated to Meath on 7 August 1756
since 1756		See part of the united bishopric of Ardagh and Clonmacnoise	

== Notes ==
- ^{A} These two bishops appear as rival bishops, and the rivalry was continued to 1237.
- ^{B} There was a disputed election after the death of Uilliam Mac Carmaic in 1373. Cairbre Ó Feaghail died at Avignon in 1378, and it is not certain that he ever got possession of the see. John Aubrey, O.P., friar of Trim, was one of the three rival candidates in 1373. (The third candidate was Richard O'Farrell, Dean of Ardagh).
- ^{C} The date of Cormac Mác Shamhradháin's resignation is uncertain, but a 'Joh.', bishop-elect of Ardagh, was in Rome in 1463.

== Bibliography ==
- Cotton, Henry (1849). The Province of Ulster. Fasti Ecclesiae Hiberniae: The Succession of the Prelates and Members of the Cathedral Bodies of Ireland. Vol. III. Dublin: Hodges and Smith.
- Fryde, E. B.; Greenway, D. E.; Porter, S.; Roy, I., eds. (1986). Handbook of British Chronology (3rd, reprinted 2003 ed.). Cambridge: Cambridge University Press. ISBN 0-521-56350-X.
- Galloway, Peter (1992). The Cathedrals of Ireland. Belfast: Institute of Irish Studies, The Queen's University of Belfast. ISBN 0-85389-452-3.
- Moody, T. W.; Martin, F. X.; Byrne, F. J., eds. (1984). Maps, Genealogies, Lists: A Companion to Irish History, Part II. New History of Ireland. Vol. XI. Oxford: Oxford University Press. ISBN 0-19-821745-5.
