= John Ferrell =

John Ferrell may refer to:

- John H. Ferrell (1829–1900), Union Navy civilian employee and Medal of Honor recipient
- John Ferrell (darts player) (born 1961), English darts player
- Will Ferrell (John William Ferrell, born 1967), American actor and comedian

== See also ==
- John Farrell (disambiguation)
