= Ó Fearghail =

Irish clan

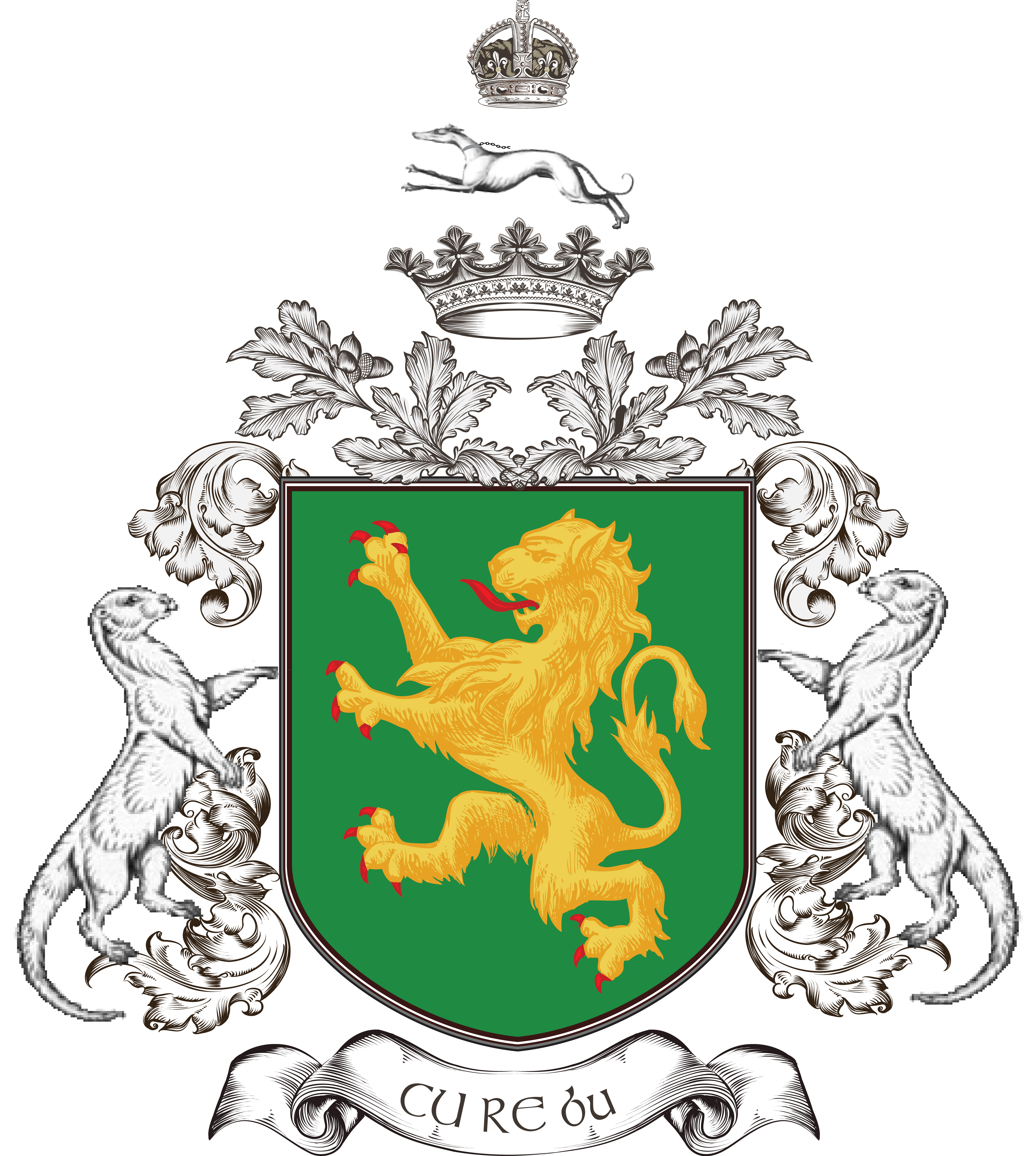
- Country: Ireland
- Founded: 11th century
- Founder: Fearghail

The Ó Fearghail are an Irish family of County Longford. The patronym means "descendant of Fearghal", whose name means "man of valour". Fearghal was a great-grandson of Angaile, who was a 10th-century King of Fortúatha. Angaile conquered Annaly, and he is the namesake of Annaly. His Ó Fearghail descendants were the Princes of Annaly for 6 centuries. The Ó Fearghail produced 7 Bishops of Ardagh.

== Early history ==
According to the historian C. Thomas Cairney, the Ó Fearghail were part of the Conmaicne Rein tribe in Ireland who came from the Erainn tribe who were the second wave of Celts to settle in Ireland from about 500 and 100 BC.

The Ó Fearghail chieftain historically sat at the Ó Fearghail stronghold of Longford (Irish: Longphort Uí Fhearghail), with another Ó Fearghail seat at Moatfarrell (Móta Uí Fhearghail) in the eastern part of Annaly, between Ballinalee and Edgeworthstown. From the early 11th century until the colonial confiscations of James I in the early 17th century, the Ó Fearghail ruled Annaly as a principality. This rule was disrupted by repeated English invasions in the 12th and 13th centuries. By the 15th century, the Ó Fearghail regained complete control and had divided into the North Annaly ruling White Ó Fearghail (Uí Fhearghail Bán) and the South Annaly ruling Yellow Ó Fearghail (Uí Fhearghail Buí). The Ó Fearghail principality was greatly undermined in 1552, when King Edward VI granted much of the lands of Annaly to Baron Delvin, including the Holy Island and lands of the Ó Fearghail. By 1618, the Ó Fearghail of Longford were finally deposed as Princes of Annaly by King James I, losing all of their lands and privileges. After the fall of the tribal Gaelic Order, many became tenants of their old land with English and Scottish landlords.

== Bishops of Ardagh ==
In the Ireland of the 14th and 15th century, ecclesiastical offices were often entrusted as hereditary offices. Members of the Ó Fearghail family produced 7 Bishops of Ardagh for the periods 1343–67, and 1373–8, and for most of the 15th century.

- Eóghan Ó Fearghail (Owen O’Ferral), 1343–1367
- Cairbre Ó Fearghail (Charles O’Ferrall), 1373–1378
- Conchobhar Ó Fearghail (Conor O’Ferral), 1416–1423
- Risdeárd Ó Fearghail (Richard O’Ferral), 1425–1444
- Donnchadh Ó Fearghail (Donatus O’Ferral), 1467–1469
- Seaán Ó Fearghail (John O’Ferral), 1469–1479
- Uilliam Ó Fearghail, (William O’Ferral) 1482–1516

== Early modern era ==
Anglicised forms of the Ó Fearghail surname include O'Farrell, Farrell, O'Farrill, Farley, O'Ferrall, Ferrell, Ferrill, and Ferril. The first record of an O'Farrell in the English language was written in 1620 by Father Richard O'Farrell of County Longford. A number of O'Farrell men served in an Irish regiment of the Spanish Army in the Eighty Years' War. By the time of the Irish Rebellion of 1641, many troops returned to fight with the Irish Catholic movement of confederate Ireland. By the end of the 17th century, the O'Farrells had mostly returned to Ireland, where they are abundant to this day in the midland counties, especially in County Longford.

== Timeline ==
- 1014: Fearghal's great-grandfather Angaile has by this stage established control over Annaly.
- 1014: Fearghail of Conmaicne was killed during the Battle of Clontarf. It is from this man that the Ó Fearghail clan claims their descent.
- 1262: The English of Meath deposed Giolla na Naomh Ó Fearghail, who committed "many evils, depredations, aggressions, spoliations, and slaughters" to re-assert his lordship of Annaly..
- 1316: The Ó Fearghail fought at the Second Battle of Athenry in support of Edward the Bruce's Irish Campaign, with four of the Ó Fearghail dying by the victorious English.
- 1323: A large English army under Lord Bermingham attempted to attack the Ó Fearghail but were repulsed and slain at the command of Donnell Ó Fearghail.
- 1329: The sons of John Ó Fearghail and a group of Meath English lured and murdered the Earl of Breifne at a house in Fore.
- 1347–1516: Eight members of the Ó Fearghail served as Bishop of Ardagh.
- 1452: The Ó Fearghail Chief clashed briefly with the Earl of Ormond, Lord Lieutenant of Ireland, over the imprisonment of Lord Bermingham's son by the O’Reillys of East Breifne. Ó Fearghail buys Ormond off, and the Lord Lieutenant leaves to pursue O’Reilly.
- 1464: John Ó Fearghail and Redmond Ó Fearghail of the Annaly Lords died of bubonic plague along with members of their families.
- 1471: A battle between the O’Reillys and the Ó Fearghail took place at Clankee in which the O’Reilly commander was killed and the Ó Fearghail Chief was taken prisoner.
- 1475: A number of the Ó Fearghail were banished to the English of Meath for killing a member of the clan.
- 1504: Chief Ó Fearghail (along with most other Irish chiefs) joined forces with the Lord Deputy, Gearóid FitzGerald, and they formed a very large army. This English/Gaelic army marched on Munster and were victorious over the O’Briens at the Battle of Knockdoe, one of the largest battles ever witnessed in Ireland.
- 1565: The Annaly Ó Fearghail repeatedly clashed with the new Lord Deputy to Ireland, Sir Henry Sidney, who planned to shire the county.
- 1618: The Ó Fearghail of Longford are finally deposed as Lords of Annaly by King James I, losing their lands and privileges forever. “They were deprived of their estates without any compensation whatsoever, or any means of subsistence assigned them” (Annals of the Four Masters).
- 1620: The first written record of an O'Farrell in the English language was by Father Richard O’Farrell, who was a priest in Annaly, Longford. He was a member of the Irish Catholic Confederacy, and later witnessed and wrote about conflicts on the European Continent.
- 1646: At the Battle of Benburb, General Richard O'Farrell, arrived in Ireland from his serving as an officer in the Spanish Army on the continent, led the Longford Column which was an O'Farrell force in the Irish Confederate Army under the leadership of Owen Roe O’Neill, and decisively defeated the Covenanters in a large scale major pitched battle. O'Farrell was deputy to Owen Roe O'Neill in the Irish Confederate Army.
- 1649: At the First Siege of Waterford, Oliver Cromwell battled with General Richard O'Farrell who arrived in order to defend the city. O'Farrell was victorious due to tactical superiority to Cromwell, namely via siege warfare experience gained battling in the Low Countries in Spanish and French armies.
- 1649: In Wexford, Captain Daniel O'Farrell recaptured Enniscorthy Castle from the New Model Army.
- 1650: Francis Fergus O’Farrell was born in County Longford. He moved to the Netherlands, married a local girl, and had six children. Eventually, he served in the army of William of Orange and saw action in England and Ireland, fighting for the Protestants.
- 1652: After Waterford, General Richard O'Farrell appeared again in Irish history, this time defending Galway with Thomas Preston, 1st Viscount Tara against the New Model Army. Here the English Parliamentarians were victorious.
- 1657: The remnants of the O’Farrell clan, known as the Wild Geese, were in the service of the French Army, and commanded an access route to Brussels during the Franco-Spanish War. However, at the behest of exiled Charles II of England, they switched sides and allowed the Spanish to pass on the road and attack Brussels from Flanders.
- 1662: The O’Farrell clan, on the orders of the recently reinstated King Charles II, was commissioned to Tangier in North Africa. 381 O’Farrells make up the bulk of the Irish contingent, which was half of the Tangier Regiment, and sailed for Africa.
- 1691: Ceadagh O’Farrell of Annaly, Longford was killed at the Battle of the Boyne. Ceadagh's three sons fled to fight in French Brigades, with some settling in Picardy, France.
- 1709: Roger O'Ferrall authored a work entitled "Linea Antiqua, or, A Genealogical, Chronological, and Historical Account of the Gathelian, Melesian, Scottish or Irish People, or Nation, from the beginning of time to this Year of Our Lord 1709", which collected together many genealogical pedigrees of the Gaels. It was later transcribed by Sir William Betham and copied by John O'Hart in his Irish Pedigrees. This document is held by the Genealogical Office at the National Library of Ireland.
- 1751: The House of More O'Ferrall is founded by the marriage of Richard O'Ferrall and Laetitia O'More. Richard held the title "Prince of Annaly" and thus the bearers of this title are now the More O'Ferralls.

== See also ==
- O'Farrell
- Annaly
- Irish clans
