= General Flynn (disambiguation) =

Michael Flynn (born 1958) is a retired U.S. Army lieutenant general and former National Security Advisor.

General Flynn may also refer to:

- Charles A. Flynn (born 1963), U.S. Army general
- John P. Flynn (1922–1997), U.S. Air Force lieutenant general
- Thomas J. Flynn (born 1930), U.S. Army major general
