= Richard O'Ferrall =

Irish bishop

Richard Ó Fearghail (O'Ferrall) was an Irish bishop of Ardagh in the 16th century. This see was located in the Ó Fearghail lands in Annaly; six earlier bishops had been members of the same family.

He was nominated on 2 May 1541 by Henry VIII, consecrated on 22 April 1542; and died in 1553. Pope Paul III would later appoint Patrick MacMahon on 14 November 1541 in opposition to Ó Fearghail.

Church of Ireland titles
Preceded by Roger O'Melline	Bishop of Ardagh; 1541–1553	Succeeded by Patrick MacMahon
