= Barry N. Haack =

American geographer

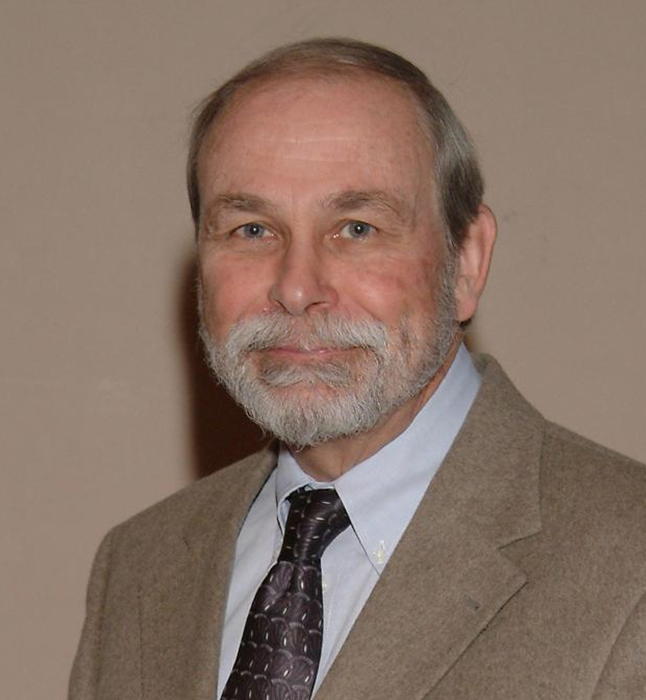
Barry N. Haack

Barry N. Haack (born November 1, 1946) is an American geographer and Emeritus Professor in the Department of Geography and Geoinformation Science at George Mason University in Fairfax, Virginia. He is an international authority on remote sensing, geographic information systems (GIS), and technology transfer from developed to developing nations. Haack is a visiting physical scientist at the United States Geological Survey and an elected Fellow in the American Society for Photogrammetry and Remote Sensing (ASPRS). Through education and collaboration, Haack has influenced the careers of scientists and decision makers from many United States federal agencies and in universities and agencies in nearly thirty countries. He has held formal arrangements with the United Nations, World Bank, Inter-American Development Bank, NASA, the European Space Agency, the National Geographic Society, and many other international organizations and country governmental agencies.

== Early life and education ==
Haack was born in Wausau, Wisconsin on November 1, 1946. He received a B.S. (Honors) from the University of Wisconsin in geography in 1969 and a geography M.A. from San Diego State University in 1971; Haack received a Ph.D. in geography from the University of Michigan in 1977. While at San Diego State University working as a teaching assistant for Dr. William Finch, a pioneer in the field of remote sensing, Haack was introduced to the study of the earth through aircraft and satellite imagery. That interest was the primary reason Haack chose to attend the University of Michigan; in Ann Arbor, Haack studied under professors Thomas Detwyler, Charles Olsen, and Waldo Tobler.

== Career and professional highlights ==
While a graduate student at the University of Michigan, Haack was employed by the Environmental Research Institute of Michigan (ERIM), initially as a research assistant and later as a research scientist. ERIM was one of the leading remote sensing organizations in the world at the time. At ERIM, Haack was involved in a number or research projects. Those that most influenced his career involved the transfer of satellite based remote sensing to developing countries. With other ERIM scientists, Haack traveled to Pakistan, Sri Lanka, and Bangladesh for multiple presentations and collection of field data. One of the specific projects was to employ Landsat satellite imagery to evaluate winter rice distribution in Bangladesh using regression analysis estimation techniques. Because his professional goal was to enter academia, Haack left ERIM to take a faculty position in geography at Ball State University in Indiana in 1978. While teaching in Indiana, Haack also served as an instructor for USAID workshops on technology transfer of remote sensing in Swaziland and Kenya.

As a basic research academic, Haack was one of the initial remote sensing scientists to integrate data from optical and radar sensors. Many of his publications are based upon this research activity. Early in his academic career, Haack had fellowships at NASA Goddard Space Flight Center and the Jet Propulsion Laboratory (JPL) at the California Institute of Technology. It was at JPL in 1981 that Haack first integrated optical and radar data and began publishing scientific articles on the topic.

As an extension of his Africa workshop participations, in 1981 Haack was offered a position as a remote sensing expert at the USAID funded Regional Remote Sensing Facility (RRSF) in Nairobi and worked there until 1983. RRSF served about 27 countries in East and Southern Africa on the technology transfer of primarily Landsat imagery through training programs, demonstration projects, and distribution of imagery. While at the RRSF, Haack began to employ satellite imagery to monitor the Omo River Delta in Lake Turkana.

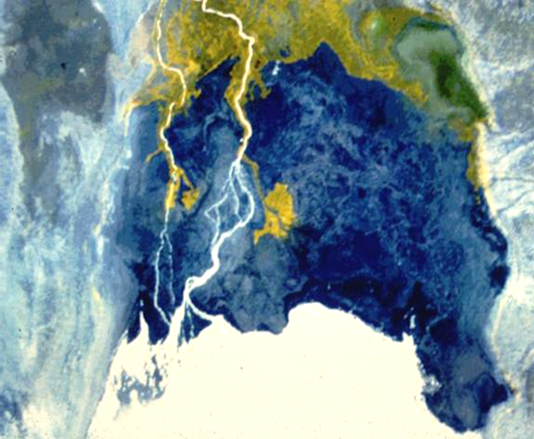
The comparison of two satellite images for 1973 and 1994, yellow and blue tones, determined a 629 km^{2} growth of the Omo River Delta in Lake Turkana, Kenya.

During the 1980s, Haack received funding from the National Science Foundation (NSF) to work with Sudanese scientists to evaluate the utility of spaceborne radar for mapping in Sudan. Haack and his students frequently used the second largest city in Sudan, Wad Madani, along the Blue Nile and associated large Gezira irrigation area as a study site.

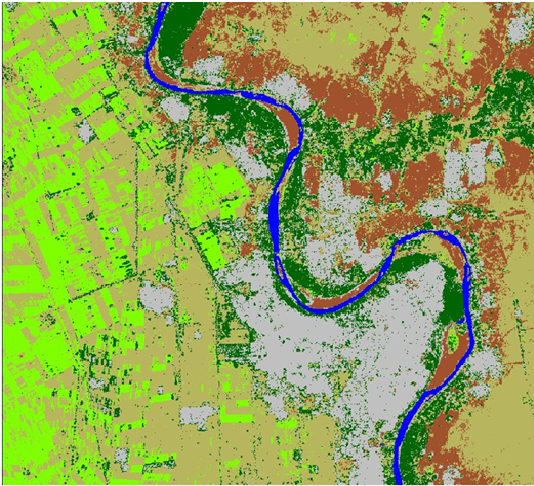
This figure is a merger of satellite obtained radar and optical images for Wad Medani, Sudan. The sensor integration improves the accuracy of mapping. Haack and Slonecker, 1994.

In 1984 he began to conduct remote sensing training for a USAID-funded National Remote Sensing Centre in Kathmandu, Nepal. That experience led to at least 15 additional professional visits to Nepal for remote sensing and GIS initiatives.

Haack was appointed Associate Professor of Geographic and Cartographic Sciences in the Geography Program at George Mason University in Fairfax, Virginia in 1985. He taught courses in physical geography and remote sensing as well as served as an advisor for master and doctoral students. Many of his students obtained prominent positions in science, policy, and intelligence areas both in the federal government and commercial companies as well as entering academia.

Haack also taught remote sensing workshops for NASA and other federal agencies, the European Space Agency in The Netherlands and at multiple international venues including Syria, Afghanistan, Vietnam, the Philippines, Peru, Suriname, and Ecuador. For the academic year 1994-1995, Haack was a Fulbright Professor in the Department of Geography at the University of Dar es Salaam in Tanzania. While in Dar es Salaam and with scientists from Kenya and Tanzania, Haack obtained NASA support to evaluate combined radar and optical satellite imagery to study refugee camps. One of the camps later visited was Dadaab in Eastern Kenya.

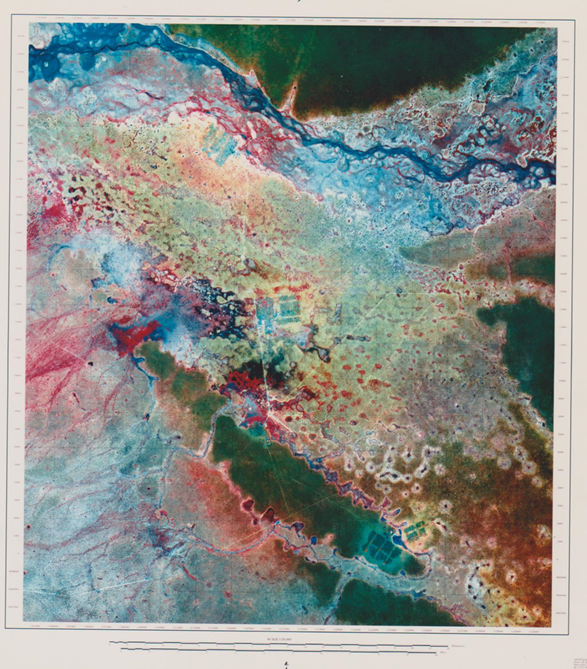
This image from a French satellite illustrates by the grey-blue geometric shapes, the three components of the Dadaab refugee camp in Eastern Kenya. Haack, 2001.

In addition to the international technology transfer activities already cited, Haack has also been supported by USDA, USGS, US Census, World Bank, United Nations, National Geographic Society, US Air Force, International Union for the Conservation of Nature, International Centre for Integrated Mountain Development, InterAmerican Development Bank, and directly by foreign governmental entities. Those activities have included program development and evaluation, training, as well as basic and applied science. Other professionally visited countries include Indonesia, Fiji, Mozambique, Thailand, China, Namibia, Malawi, Zambia, and Ethiopia.

Haack was involved in national mapping activities in multiple countries. In Afghanistan, that effort was in support of the evaluation and improvement of the agricultural sector. A specific focus was changes in the Helmand-Arghandab irrigation scheme. His multiple activities in Suriname included advising on the conversion of all land ownership information to digital format as well as the social environmental impact of a proposed bauxite mine in the interior rainforest. In Nepal, he mapped urban expansion in the Kathmandu Valley and was the Chief Technical Advisor for a large international programme to develop improved management tools for the high mountains including Mount Everest.

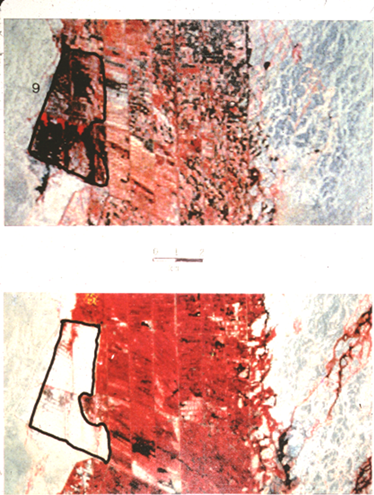
These two Landsat image sublets from 1973 and 1990 of a portion of the Helmand-Arghandab irrigation scheme in Afghanistan illustrate decreased areas of crops. The study estimated a 20% (14000 ha) decrease in agriculture for the scheme. Haack, Wolf and English, 1998.

Haack has been on the editorial board for several scientific journals, including GIScience and Remote Sensing. He has also been active his entire career with the major scientific organization in his field, ASPRS. In 2006, Haack was elected a Fellow in ASPRS on the first ballot, a significant recognition in his scientific community.

== Selected publications ==
Haack has published over 200 primarily peer-reviewed journal articles, book chapters, and major scientific reports, which are the primary standard for scientific contributions. He is first author on over 60 percent of the publications and corresponding author often with primary responsibility or with a student as first author for another 25 percent of the publications. At the time of his retirement in February, 2020, he had over 2000 professional scientific citations, another major form of scientific recognition, as documented on Google Scholar. Haack has authored chapters in the remote sensing industry standard manuals published by ASPRS.

- Haack, B., 1982. "Landsat: A Tool for Development." World Development 10 (10): 899-909.
- Haack, B., 1983. "An Analysis of Thematic Mapper Simulator Data for Urban Environments." Remote Sensing of Environment, 13 (3): 265-275.
- Haack, B., 1983. "A Comparison of Visual and Numerical Analyses of Landsat Data for Grassland and Forest Inventories in Swaziland." ITC Journal, (1): 6-12.
- Haack, B., 1987. "An Assessment of Landsat MSS and TM Data for Urban and Near Urban Land Cover Digital Classification." Remote Sensing of Environment. 21 (1): 201-213.
- Haack, B., 1992. "The Effects of the Crop Calendar on Urban Mapping with SPOT Imagery." Asian Pacific Remote Sensing Journal. 4(2):101-111.
- Haack, B. and T. Slonecker, 1994. "Merged Spaceborne Radar and Thematic Mapper Digital Data for Locating Villages in Sudan. "Photogrammetric Engineering and Remote Sensing. 60(10):1253-1257.
- Haack, B. and S. Jampoler, 1995. "Color Composite Comparisons for Agricultural Assessments." International Journal of Remote Sensing.16 (9):1589-1598.
- Haack, B., J. Wolf and R. English, 1994. "Rehabilitation Assessment of the Helmand Arghandab Valley Irrigation Scheme in Afghanistan." Water International.19:121-128.
- Haack, B., D. Craven and S. Jampoler, 1996. "GIS Tracks Kathmandu Valley's Urban Expansion." GIS World. 9(2): 54-57.
- Haack, B. and R. English, 1996. "National Land Cover Mapping by Remote Sensing." World Development. 24(5): 845-855.
- Haack, B., D. Craven and S. Jampoler, 1997. "Processing Techniques for Mapping Urban Growth: Kathmandu, Nepal." Geocarto International.12(1): 5-12.
- Haack, B., J. Wolf and R. English, 1998. "Remote Sensing Change Detection of Irrigated Agriculture in Afghanistan." Geocarto International. 65-75.
- Haack, B., and M. Bechdol, 1999. "Multisensor Remote Sensing Data for Land Use/Cover Mapping." Computers, Environment and Urban Systems. 23: 53-69.
- Haack, B. and M. Bechdol, 2000. "Integrating Multisensor Data and RADAR Texture Measures for Land Cover Mapping." Computers and Geosciences. 26: 411-421.
- Haack, B., N. Herold and M. Bechdol, 2000. "Radar and Optical Data Integration for Land-Use/Land-Cover Mapping." Photogrammetric Engineering and Remote Sensing, 66 (6): 709-716.
- Haack, B., E. Solomon, N. Herold and M. Bechdol, 2002. "Radar and Optical Data Comparison\Integration for Urban Delineation: A Case Study." Photogrammetric Engineering and Remote Sensing. 68(12):1289-1296.
- Haack, B., D. Craven, S. Jampoler and E. Solomon, 2002. "Urban Growth In Kathmandu, Nepal: Mapping Analysis and Prediction." Chapter in: Linking People, Place and Prediction, A GIScience Approach edited by S. Walsh and K. Crews-Meyer. pp. 263–282.
- Haack, B. and A. Rafter, 2006. "Urban Growth Analysis and Modeling in the Kathmandu Valley, Nepal." Habitat International. 30:411-421.
- Haack, B. and N. Harold, 2006. "Comparison and Integration of Radar and Optical Data for Land Use/Cover Mapping." Geocarto International.21(4):9-19.
- Haack, B., 2007. "A Comparison of Land Use/Cover Mapping with Varied Radar Incidence Angles and Seasons." GIScience and Remote Sensing .44(4): 305-319.
- Haack, B. and A. Falconer, 2008. "Remote Sensing for Land Management." United Nations Economic Commission of Africa Land Information Management Systems in the Knowledge Economy, Symposium Proceedings. 222-243.
- Haack, B., 2009. "History and Analysis of Mapping Urban Expansion in the Kathmandu Valley, Nepal." The Cartographic Journal.46(3):233-241.
- Haack, B. and G. Khatiwada, 2010. "Comparison and Integration of Optical and Quad Polarization Radar Imagery for Land Cover/Use Delineation." Journal of Applied Remote Sensing. 4(1):16pp.
- Panzeri, D., P. Caroli and B. Haack, 2013. "Sagarmatha Park (Mt Everest) Porter Survey and Analysis." Tourism Management. 36: 26-34.
- Haack, B., R. Mahabir and J. Kerkering, 2014. "Remote Sensing-derived National Land Cover Land Use Maps: a Comparison for Malawi." Geocarto International. 30 (3): 270-292.
- Shermeyer, J. and B. Haack, 2015. "Remote Sensing Change Detection Methods to Track Deforestation and Growth in Threatened Rainforests in Madre de Dios, Peru." Journal of Applied Remote Sensing. 9:15pp.
- Haack, B. and R. Ryerson, 2016. "Improving Remote Sensing Research and Education in Developing Countries: Approaches and Recommendations." "International Journal of Applied Earth Observation and Geoinformation." 45:77-83
- Haack, B. and R. Ryerson, 2017. "Training for Remote Sensing Image Interpretation." "Photogrammetric Engineering and Remote Sensing." 83(12):795-806.
- Haack, B. and R. Mahabir, 2019. "Optical and Radar Data Analysis for Land Use Land Cover Mapping in Peru." "Remote Sensing of Land." 3(1):15-27.
- Quirk, B. and B. Haack, 2019. "Federal Government Applications of UAS Technology." "Small Unmanned Aircraft Systems: Best Practices and Case Studies, edited by J. B. Sharma.
