= Patrick MacMahon (bishop) =

Irish bishop

Patrick MacMahon, O.F.M. (died c.1572 or c.1575) was Bishop of Ardagh in Ireland, recognised at various times by both the Roman Catholic church in Ireland and the Church of Ireland. His appointment to the see was approved by the Vatican on 14 November 1541. The Reformation in Ireland had begun, but there was not yet a definitive break between, on the one hand, the hierarchy recognised by the Roman Curia and, on the other hand, the established church recognised by the Dublin Castle administration of the English king Henry VIII. The Diocese of Ardagh was in the Annaly region of the Farrell clan, of whom Richard O'Ferrall had secured the temporalities of the diocese in July 1541. George Cromer, the Church of Ireland Archbishop of Armagh and primate of all Ireland, recognised O'Ferrall and had him consecrated on 22 April 1542. Cromer's successor George Dowdall on 15 May 1544 appointed MacMahon instead as a suffragan bishop inter Hibernicos ("among the [Gaelic] Irish"). When the Catholic Queen Mary I succeeded to the throne in 1553, papal supremacy was recognised and MacMahon received the temporalities of Ardagh. While Monahan says that Ardagh was vacant in the Church of Ireland after the accession of Elizabeth I, others regard MacMahon as retaining his place in both hierarchies. A possibly forged papal bull, dated 1568, deprives MacMahon of his see for simony, non-residence, and neglect of the cathedral. A putative 1572 letter from Marshalsea from a former bishop "Malachy" of Ardagh, abjuring "papistical superstition" and promising loyalty to Elizabeth, may if genuine be from MacMahon. MacMahon's death is inferred to have occurred either before 5 November 1572, when a successor was appointed in the Church of Ireland, or else during 1575, before Richard Brady was appointed by the Vatican on 23 January 1576.
