= Ferrell =

- Pronunciation: /ˈfɛrəl/ FERR-əl

Origin
- Origin: Ireland

Ferrell is an English surname of Irish origin.

== Origin ==
The name may be derived from the patronym Ó Fearghail (meaning "descendant of Fearghal", whose name means "man of valour").

If this is so, it would be another version of the names Farrell, O'Farrell, and Farrall, in that they are anglicized forms of the Gaelic patronym Ó Fearghail. See also O'Ferrall.

== Surname ==
- Amare Ferrell (born 2005), American football player
- Andy Ferrell (1984), English footballer
- Clelin Ferrell (born 1997), American football player
- Conchata Ferrell (1943–2020), American actress
- Jami Ferrell (born 1974), American model
- John H. Ferrell (1829–1900), American recipient of the Medal Of Honor
- Mary Ferrell (1922–2004), American historian
- Monica Ferrell (born 1975), American poet and fiction writer
- Rachelle Ferrell (born 1964), American singer
- Richard Allan Ferrell (1926–2005), American theoretical physicist
- Rick Ferrell (1905–1995), American baseball player
- Robert H. Ferrell (1921–2018), American historian
- Rod Ferrell (born 1980), American murderer
- Sierra Ferrell (born 1988), American singer
- Tyra Ferrell (born 1962), American actress
- Wes Ferrell (1908–1976), American baseball player
- Will Ferrell (born 1967), American comedian and actor

== See also ==
- Ferrel (disambiguation), including a list of people with the surname
