= Ponte da Mizarela =

Bridge in Portugal

- Coordinates: 41°41′31″N 8°01′10″W
- Locale: Braga District, Portugal

Location
- Interactive map of Ponte da Mizarela

Bridge of Mizarela (Portuguese: Ponte da Mizarela) is a medieval bridge that crosses the Rio Rabagão, between the civil parish of Ruivães (municipality of Vieira do Minho) and civil parish of Ferral (in the municipality of Montalegre), the Portuguese district of Braga.

== History ==
It was built in the Middle Ages and was reconstructed in the beginning of the 19th century.

According to a local legend, it was built by the Devil himself.

The bridge was nicknamed "Saltador" ("jumper").

Marshal Soult's army crossed the bridge on 17 May 1809 during the French retreat from Porto. Portuguese militia had refused to destroy the bridge, opting to barricade it instead. Major Dulong of the 31st Léger led the assault on the bridge, clearing the French army's escape to Spain.

== Characteristics ==
It is implemented in an escarpment, set in rocks with some altitude relative to the riverbed. It consists of a single arch with a span of 13 m (43 ft).

== See also ==
- List of bridges in Portugal
