= Jack Farrell (disambiguation) =

Jack Farrell (1857–1914), also known as "Moose" Farrell, was a baseball player and manager.

Jack Farrell may also refer to:

- Jack Farrell (outfielder) (1856–1916), outfielder for the Hartford Dark Blues baseball team
- Jack Farrell (infielder) (1892–1918), infielder for the Chicago Whales baseball team
- Jack Farrell (footballer, born 1873) (1873–1947), English footballer
- Jack Farrell (Australian footballer) (1872–1953), Australian rules footballer

== See also ==
- John Farrell (disambiguation)
