= Ferrill =

Ferrill is a surname. Notable people with the surname include:

- Arther Ferrill (born 1938), American historian
- London Ferrill (1789–1854), American Baptist minister

== See also ==
- Ferrell
- Ferril
- Merrill (surname)
