= O'Farrill =

O'Farrill is a Hispanic surname derived from the Old Irish patronym Ó Fearghail. Notable people with the surname include:

- Arturo O'Farrill (born 1960), Mexican musician based in New York, son of Chico
- Chico O'Farrill (1921–2001), Cuban musician
- Gonzalo O'Farrill y Herrera (1754–1831), Spanish soldier and politician
- Rómulo O'Farrill (1917–2006), Mexican businessman
- Yordan O'Farrill (born 1993), Cuban sprinter
