= O'Farrell =

O'Farrell is an anglicised form of the Old Irish patronym Ó Fearghail. According to the historian C. Thomas Cairney, the O'Farrells were part of the Conmaicne Rein tribe in Ireland who came from the Erainn tribe who were the second wave of Celts to settle in Ireland from about 500 and 100 BC.

== People with the surname ==
- Barry O'Farrell, Australian politician
- Bernadette O'Farrell (1924–1999), Irish actress
- Bob O'Farrell, American baseball player
- Brett O'Farrell (disambiguation), several people
  - Brett O'Farrell (Australian rules footballer) (born 1978), Australian footballer
  - Brett O'Farrell (rugby league) (born 1980), Australian footballer
- Derek O'Farrell (born 1983), Canadian rower
- Elizabeth O'Farrell (1884–1957), Irish revolutionary
- Finola O'Farrell, British judge
- Francis O'Farrell, Canadian politician
- Francis Fergus O'Farrell, Irish soldier
- Frank O'Farrell, Irish footballer
- Henry O'Farrell, Australian assassin
- Jasper O'Farrell, American politician
- John O'Farrell (disambiguation), several people
  - John O'Farrell (author) (born 1962), British writer and political activist
  - John O'Farrell (politician) (1826–1892), Canadian politician
  - John O'Farrell (venture capitalist), American financier
  - John A. O'Farrell (1823–1900), American adventurer
  - J. T. O'Farrell (died 1971), Irish politician
- Josh O'Farrell, American politician
- Lauren O'Farrell (born 1977), British artist
- Luke O'Farrell (born 1990), Irish hurler
- Maggie O'Farrell, Irish-British novelist
- Maud O'Farrell Swartz (1879–1937), American politician
- Maureen O'Farrell, British actress
- Michael O'Farrell (disambiguation), several people
  - Michael O'Farrell (bishop) (1865–1928), Australian bishop
  - Michael O'Farrell (gangster) (1949–1989), American gangster
  - Michael J. O'Farrell (1832–1894), Irish bishop
- Mitch O'Farrell, American politician
- Patrick O'Farrell, Australian historian
- Patrick H. O'Farrell, American biologist
- Richard O'Farrell (British Army officer) (died 1757), British colonel
- Richard O'Farrell (Irish Confederate), Irish soldier
- Séamus O'Farrell (died 1973), Irish politician
- Seánie O'Farrell (born 1977), Irish hurler
- Stella O’Farrell (born 1956), Film & TV Make-up director
- Tadeo O'Farrell (died 1602), Irish bishop
- Talbot O'Farrell (1878–1952), English singer
- Tony O'Farrell (born 1947), Irish mathematician
- Ursula O'Farrell (née Cussen; 1934–2022), Irish author

== Places with the name ==
- O'Farrell, San Diego, California
- O'Farrell, Texas
- O'Farrell Community School
- Mitchell Brothers O'Farrell Theatre
- O'Farrell Street, San Francisco, California

== See also ==
- Ó Fearghail
- Pre-Norman invasion Irish Celtic kinship groups, from whom many of the modern Irish surnames came from
- Farrell (disambiguation)
