= Brett O'Farrell =

Brett O'Farrell may refer to:

- Brett O'Farrell (Australian rules footballer) (born 1978), former Australian rules footballer
- Brett O'Farrell (rugby league) (born 1980), rugby league footballer of the 1990s and 2000s
