= Feral (disambiguation) =

A feral animal is an animal living in the wild but descended from domesticated individuals.

Feral may also refer to:

- Feral (character), a Marvel Comics character
- Feral (grape), a Portuguese wine grape
- Feral (Mutant X)
- Feral (subculture), an Australian counter-cultural movement
- Feral Brewing Company, an Australian brewery
- Feral child, a child that has been isolated from human contact
- Feral House, an American book publishing company
- Feral Interactive, a British video game company
- Feral Tribune, a Croatian satirical weekly newspaper
- Feral (2012 film), a 2012 short film
- Feral, a 1974 book by Berton Roueché
- Feral: searching for enchantment on the frontiers of rewilding, a 2013 book by George Monbiot
- "Feral", a song by Radiohead from their 2011 album The King of Limbs
- Feral, 2023 studio album by Left to Suffer
- Feral, an Australian/New Zealand term for a low-life

== See also ==
- Ferral (disambiguation)
