= Verrall =

Verrall is a surname. Notable people with the surname include:

- Arthur Woollgar Verrall (1851–1912), British classical scholar
- Ayesha Verrall (born 1979), New Zealand physician and politician
- John Verrall (composer) (1908–2001), American composer
- John Verrall (politician) (1849–1921), New Zealand politician
- Margaret Verrall (1857–1916), English parapsychologist
- Pamela Motley Verrall (1915–1996), Welsh composer
- Richard Verrall (born 1948), British politician
- Richard Verrall (academic) (born 1959), British actuarial scientist
- Robert Verrall (1928–2025), Canadian filmmaker
- George Henry Verrall (1848–1911), British horse racing official, entomologist, botanist, and Conservative politician

== See also ==
- Verrall v Great Yarmouth BC, a UK court case
