= Ferrol (disambiguation) =

Ferrol is a city in Spain.

Ferrol may also refer to:

== Places ==
- Ferrol (comarca), a coastal region in Spain
- Ferrol, Romblon, a municipality in the Philippines
- Ferrol, Virginia, a town in the United States
- Ferrol Bay, in northwestern Peru
- Ferrol Island, an island of Peru

== Other uses ==
- Ferrol Sams (1922–2013), American physician and novelist
- Racing de Ferrol, an association football club

== See also ==
- Ferrel (disambiguation)
- Ferral, civil parish in Portugal
