= John Farrell =

John Farrell may refer to:

== Sportspeople ==
- John Farrell (manager) (born 1962), American Major League Baseball manager
- John Farrell (second baseman) (1876–1921), American Major League Baseball infielder
- John Farrell (speed skater) (1906–1994), American Olympic skater and coach
- John Farrell (hurler) (born 1961), Irish hurler
- John Farrell (sport shooter) (born 1954), New Zealand sports shooter
- Johnny Farrell (1901–1988), American golfer

== Other people ==
- John Farrell (bishop) (1820–1873), Canadian Roman Catholic bishop
- John Farrell (Australian poet) (1851–1904), Australian journalist and poet
- John Farrell (poet) (1968–2010), American poet and composer
- John Farrell (VC) (1826–1865), Irish Victoria Cross winner
- John A. Farrell, American reporter, and biographer
- John H. Farrell (1919–1995), New York politician
- John S. Farrell (1880–1938), mayor of Green Bay, Wisconsin
- John J. Farrell (Minnesota politician) (1872–1946), Dairy and Food Commissioner of Minnesota
- John J. Farrell (Irish politician) (1871–1954), Irish politician and Lord Mayor of Dublin
- John J. Farrell (businessman) (1890–1966), American shipping line executive
- John Farrell (architect) (1868–1938), New Zealand architect and politician
- John Farrell (1821—1891), Irish sculptor

== See also ==
- Jack Farrell (disambiguation)
- John Farrell Easmon (1856–1900), Krio doctor
- John Ferrell (disambiguation)
- John O'Farrell (disambiguation)
