= Sinéad Farrell =

British-American space scientist

Sinéad Louise Farrell
- Education: University College London
- Scientific career
- Workplaces: University of Maryland, College Park; University College London
- Thesis: Satellite laser altimetry over sea ice (2007)

Sinéad Louise Farrell is a British-American space scientist who is Professor of Geographic Sciences at the University of Maryland, College Park. Her research considers remote sensing and climate monitoring. She was science lead for the ICESat-2 Mission, which used laser altimetry to make height maps of Earth.

== Early life and education ==
Farrell was an undergraduate student in geological science at University College London. She remained at UCL for doctoral research, where she studied space and climate physics. Her research considered satellite laser altimetry, using data collected from ICESat to understand sea-ice covered regions of the Arctic. Farrell worked as a postdoctoral researcher at UCL for one year, after which she was appointed at research fellow at the National Oceanic and Atmospheric Administration National Environmental Satellite, Data, and Information Service (NOAA NESDIS) laboratory. She was made a research associate at the University of Maryland, College Park in 2009.

== Research and career ==
In 2011, Farrell was appointed to the faculty in the Earth System Science Interdisciplinary Center at the University of Maryland, College Park. She moved to the Department of Geographical Sciences as an associate professor in 2019. Farrell studies polar oceans and sea ice. She has been involved with several NASA missions, and demonstrated the ability of satellite data to better understand ice-covered water.

Farrell was part of Operation IceBridge, a NASA mission that revealed ridges on sea ice. She leads the NASA ICESat-2 Science Team, which was able to demonstrated that the Arctic lost one third of its volume from 2003, and that glacial lakes were forming under ice in the Antarctic. Using ICESat-2, Farrell was able to accurately measure the topography of sea ice, which she proposed could be used to map sea ice models. In 2022, anomalously warm weather caused one of the lowest levels of sea ice in modern record.

== Selected publications ==
- Seymour W. Laxon; Katharine A. Giles; Andy L. Ridout; et al. (28 February 2013). "CryoSat-2 estimates of Arctic sea ice thickness and volume". Geophysical Research Letters. 40 (4): 732–737. Bibcode:2013GeoRL..40..732L. doi:10.1002/grl.50193. ISSN 0094-8276. Wikidata Q56679591.
- Thorsten Markus; Tom Neumann; Anthony Martino; et al. (March 2017). "The Ice, Cloud, and land Elevation Satellite-2 (ICESat-2): Science requirements, concept, and implementation". Remote Sensing of Environment. 190: 260–273. Bibcode:2017RSEnv.190..260M. doi:10.1016/j.rse.2016.12.029. ISSN 0034-4257. Wikidata Q58057957.
- Waleed Abdalati; H. Jay Zwally; Robert Bindschadler; et al. (May 2010). "The ICESat-2 Laser Altimetry Mission". Proceedings of the IEEE. 98 (5): 735–751. doi:10.1109/jproc.2009.2034765. ISSN 0018-9219. Wikidata Q58058047.

== Personal life ==
Alongside her research, Farrell campaigns to improve access to science. In 2021, when no women were nominated to be fellows in the cryosphere section of the American Geophysical Union, she decided not to elect anyone at all.
