= Joy Farrall Jones =

British artist (born 1933)

Joy Farrall Jones (née Joyce Margaret Mellor; born 1933) is a British painter and illustrator.

== Biography ==
Jones was born in Bangalore in India and studied art at the Regional College of Art in Manchester from 1954 to 1957 and then at St Martin's School of Art in London for a further two years. Jones lectured at the Marylebone Institute in London and during the 1960s, as a freelance artist, produced illustrations for the Cambridge Schools Classics Project, the Encyclopedia Britannica, the book publishers Blackie and Son and Arnold Publishers. Jones moved to Wales sometime around 1967 and undertook illustration work for the Nature Conservancy Council, the Overton Trust Fund, the Welsh Schools Council and the University of Wales Press throughout the 1970s and 1980s.

Aside from her illustration work, Jones has produced paintings of flowers and animals, portraits in miniature and still life works, often in tempera. Since 1997 Jones has been a member of the Royal Cambrian Academy and taken part in numerous group exhibitions, including a two-person exhibition at the National Slate Museum at Llanberis. Solo exhibitions of her work have been held at the Mall Galleries in London, in Rhyl, at the Tegfryn Art Gallery and in Canada. Her work was influenced by several visits to India and the Indian Army holds portraits by her.
