= Ferrell, West Virginia =

Unincorporated community in West Virginia

- Unincorporated community
- Location within West Virginia and the United States Ferrell (the United States)
- Coordinates: 38°21′10″N 81°50′00″W
- Country: United States
- State: West Virginia
- County: Kanawha
- Elevation: 604 ft (184 m)
- Time zone: UTC-5 (Eastern (EST))
  - Summer (DST): UTC-4 (EDT)
- ZIP code: 25177
- Area codes: 304 & 681
- GNIS ID: 1554451

Ferrell is an unincorporated area in Kanawha County, West Virginia, United States.

The community was part of the Upper Falls census-designated place from 2010 until 2020.

Residents receive mail using the city name Saint Albans at ZIP Code 25177.

Ferrell is in the Charleston, West Virginia metropolitan area.
