= Ferrel Seamount =

Small underwater volcano west of Baja California

- Summit depth: 2,650 m (8,694 ft)
- Height: 2,650 m (8,694 ft)
- Summit area: volume:1687km^{3} setting:Abyssal plain

Location
- Location: Southwest of Baja California
- Coordinates: 29°30′52″N 117°17′39″W
- Country: California

Geology
- Type: small A3 Seamount
- Volcanic arc/chain: Hotspot volcano
- Age of rock: plate 53-63 million years.

Ferrel Seamount is a small seamount (underwater volcano) west of Baja California, at 29°30′52″N 117°17′39″W. Ferrel seamount has been mapped approximately 18% by the USGS, and has two summits. It is located in the Baja California seamounts region and sits on the edge of the abyssal plain.
