= John Ditzenback =

- Born: c. 1828; New York, New York, U.S.
- Military career
- Allegiance: United States of America
- Branch: United States Navy
- Rank: Quartermaster
- Unit: (Indiana) U.S. Monitor Neosho
- Awards: Medal of Honor

Quartermaster John Ditzenback (born c. 1828) was an American soldier who fought in the American Civil War. Ditzenback received the country's highest award for bravery during combat, the Medal of Honor, for his action aboard the USS Neosho (1863) on 6 December 1864. He was honored with the award on 22 June 1865.

== Biography ==
Ditzenback was born in New York, New York in 1828. He enlisted into the United States Navy.

== Medal of Honor citation ==
Served on board the U.S. Monitor Neosho during the engagement with enemy batteries at Bells Mills, Cumberland River, near Nashville, Tenn., 6 December 1864. Carrying out his duties courageously during the engagement, Ditzenback gallantly left the pilot house after the flag and signal staffs of that vessel had been shot away and, taking the flag which was drooping over the wheelhouse, made it fast to the stump of the highest mast remaining, although the ship was still under a heavy fire from the enemy.

== See also ==
- List of American Civil War Medal of Honor recipients: A–F
