= Thomas Flynn (bishop of Ardagh) =

Irish Roman Catholic clergyman

Thomas Flynn was an Irish Roman Catholic clergyman who served as Bishop of Ardagh from 1718 to 1730.

Thomas Flynn was born in 1652 at Errew in Gortlettragh, Co. Leitrim. During the Penal Laws, he studied for the priesthood, in France. He studied in the faculty of law, gaining a BCL (1692), a LCL (1693) and a DCL (1696).

Dr Flynn was appointed Bishop of Ardagh by a papal brief on 18 May 1718 and consecrated on 15 July 1718. Bishop Flynn was suspended by the Primate Hugh MacMahon in 1729, for ordaining unsuitable candidates for the priesthood. He died in office on 29 January 1730. His death in 1730 was disputed, supported by letters in the Stuart Court, which led to the delay in his successor Peter Mulligan becoming Bishop until 1732.

Bishop Flynn was buried in the Cloone cemetery, County Leitrim. The original headstone was defaced but a new one was erected and consecrated to his memory in 1975.

Catholic Church titles
Preceded by Ambrose O'Conor O.P. (vicar apostolic)	Bishop of Ardagh; 1718–1730	Succeeded by Peter Mulligan (O.E.S.A.) (bishop)
