= Ferril =

Ferril is a surname. Notable people with the surname include:

- John H. Ferril (1873–1945), American businessman and politician
- Thomas Hornsby Ferril (1896–1988), American poet

== See also ==
- Ferri
- Ferrill
