= Graham Farrell =

British criminologist (born 1967)

- Born: 25 April 1967 (age 59)
- Education: University of Surrey, University of Manchester
- Scientific career
- Fields: Criminology
- Workplaces: University of Leeds, Simon Fraser University, Loughborough University
- Academic advisors: Ken Pease

Graham Farrell (born 25 April 1967) is a British criminologist who is Professor of International and Comparative Criminology at the University of Leeds School of Law.

== Education and career ==
Farrell received his BSc from the University of Surrey and his PhD from the University of Manchester. He worked at the University of Oxford's Centre for Criminological Research before joining the United Nations in the 1990s. He then taught at Loughborough University and at Simon Fraser University, where he was appointed Professor in Environmental Criminology in 2013. He joined the University of Leeds in 2015.

== Research interests ==
Farrell is known for his research into the crime drop in Canada and other countries, and the effectiveness of different burglary security devices. He has also researched the anti-opium poppy policies enforced in Afghanistan by the Taliban, and the number of crimes excluded from the British Crime Survey.
