= Maurice Farrell =

Irish association footballer

Personal information
- Date of birth: 22 November 1969 (age 56)
- Place of birth: Dublin, Ireland
- Position: Defender

Senior career*
Years	Team	Apps	(Gls)
1988	Shelbourne		
- Home Farm
- Athlone Town
1990–1991	Elm Rovers		
1991–2004	Bray Wanderers	274	(3)
2009	Shelbourne	1	(0)
- * Club domestic league appearances and goals

Maurice Farrell (born 22 November 1969) is an Irish retired footballer who had a 13-year spell with League of Ireland club Bray Wanderers. Farrell played as a left back.

== Career ==
Farrell made a name at Bray Wanderers over a period of 13 years for whom he was the club's longest serving player. He began his senior career with Shelbourne in 1988 before spells with Home Farm, Athlone Town and non-league Elm Rovers. Farrell joined Bray Wanderers prior to the start of the 1991–92 League of Ireland Premier Division. During his lengthy career at the Carlisle Grounds, Farrell made over 300 competitive first-team appearances for Bray. He won two First Division titles for Bray in 1996 and 2000 and won two further promotions from the First Division for Bray in 1998 and 2004. During his time at the club, Farrell helped Bray Wanderers win the 1999 FAI Cup final with victory over Finn Harps following a second replay. Farrell retired from senior football at the end of the 2004 First Division season with Bray after helping them to a 3rd-place finish and promotion to the Premier Division. Prior to his retirement from Bray, Farrell's testimonial match was attended by "thousands" and included a Bray Wanderers and Irish international selection.

Farrell made a short comeback to League of Ireland football in June 2009 with Shelbourne, after joining the club's coaching staff. Farrell also registered as a player for Shelbourne, and following his retirement 5 years previously, made a comeback as player at the age of 39 on 10 July 2009 when he came on as a 90th-minute substitute for Shelbourne in a 1–0 victory over UCD.

== Honours ==
- League of Ireland First Division: 2
  - Bray Wanderers – 1995–96, 1999–2000
- FAI Cup: 1
  - Bray Wanderers – 1999
