= James Michael Farrell =

Australian businessman and philanthropist

JP James Michael Farrell
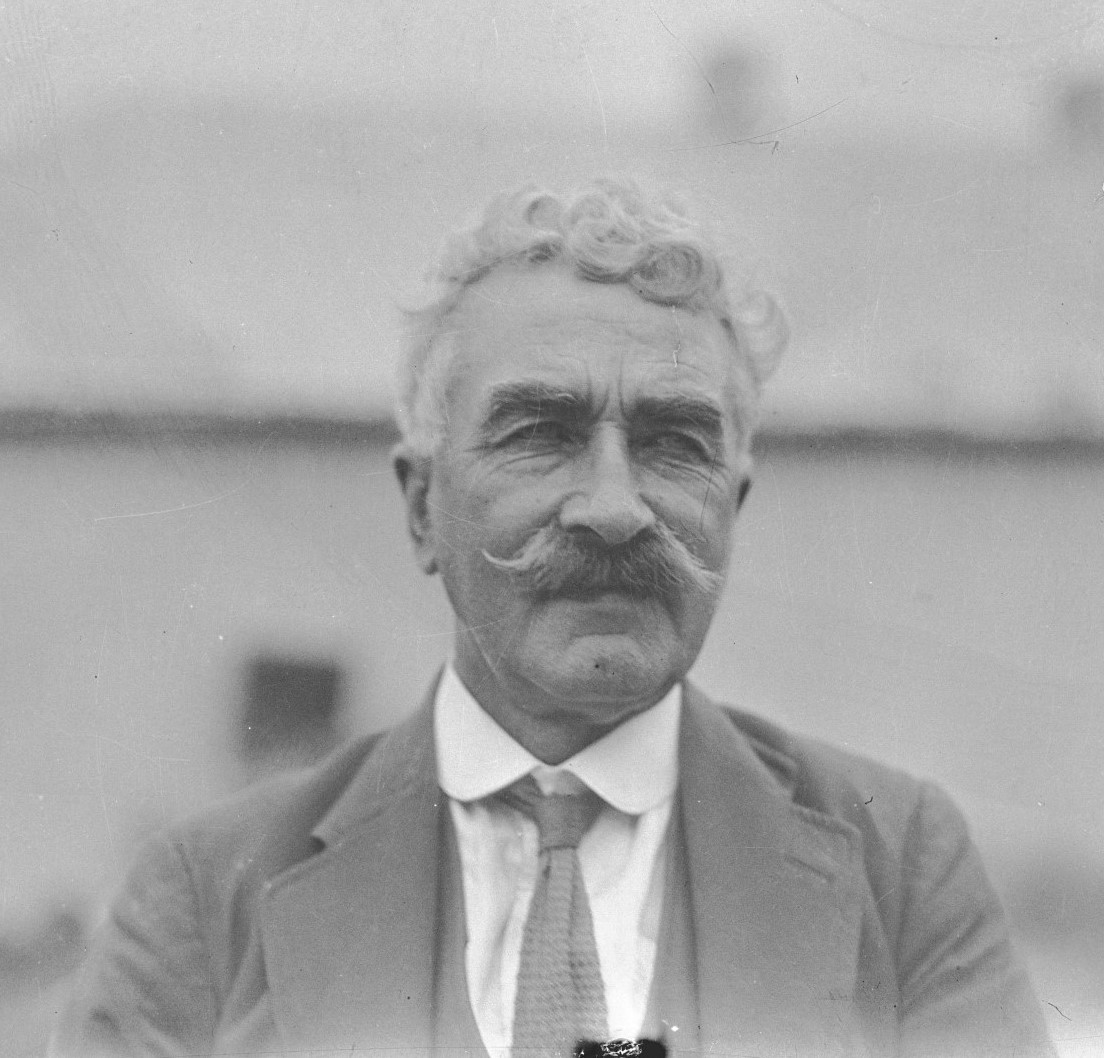
- James Michael Farrell in 1930
- Born: 1869; Inverleigh, Victoria
- Died: December 13, 1944 (aged 74–75); Fremantle, Western Australia
- Burial place: Fremantle Cemetery
- Other names: J. M. Farrell
- Occupations: Justice of the Peace, Grazier, Businessman, Merchant Wholesaler, Hotelier, Councilor, Engineer

James Michael Farrell JP (1869; Inverleigh, Victoria - December 13, 1944; Fremantle, Western Australia) a.k.a. J. M. Farrell was an Australian businessman, philanthropist, and civic father for Fremantle. Farrell was known as a supporter of progressive movements and for pioneering the horse racing sport in Fremantle.

Farrell was part of the gold rush and post gold rush development of the port city of Fremantle, chairing and sitting on numerous elected public amenity boards, and was a Justice of the Peace actively administering justice in Fremantle magistrate courts.

== Background ==
Farrell was born in Inverleigh, Victoria in 1869 to a family of graziers. When he left school he joined the Victorian Railways in 1891 and became a duly qualified engineer. In 1895, he left the Colony of Victoria and relocated to Western Australia which was experiencing a gold rush to seek his fortune in the goldfields.

After two years of prospecting, Farrell and his brother William settled in Fremantle and established their wholesale merchant business, Farrell Bros., in 1897. The business was headquartered on Howard Street, Fremantle, and dealt primarily with importing grains from their family lands in the colony of Victoria. It earned a reputation as one of the leading produce firms in Western Australia, importing high quality products yet to be available in the Western Australian markets.

In 1904, when the Bicton Race Club was first established, Farrell was appointed as the club's first secretary. Farrell recognized the potential for trotting in Fremantle, and for about six years before the Fremantle Trotting Club was officially established, he advocated for the introduction of regular trotting events. In 1928, after the club was established, Farrell held the secretarial reins and remained in his position for 10 years until September 1938.

Farrell owned several hotels, including the Hotel Leopold on Canning Road, Bicton, where he and his wife resided on July 31, 1909, and oversaw the management of the hotel together.

Farrell held a seat in the Fremantle Municipal Council's central ward for 14 years, during which he served as the chairman of the works committee. He was also a Cemetery Board of Directors member and served on the Fremantle Hospital Board for 9 years.

In 1920, Farrell founded and became the president of the Fremantle Ugly Men's Association, a fundraising and charitable organization. The association played a key role in organizing charitable efforts, including raising funds for Fremantle Hospital and the first motor ambulance in Fremantle. During this time, Farrel served as the president of St. Patrick's Tennis Club.

In the 1927 selection ballot for a seat in the Western Australian Legislative Council, Farrell was a contender representing the Labor Party but came in second behind Gilbert R. Fraser. Despite not winning the nomination, Farrell's popularity was highlighted in this race, even though he did not have as much experience in union leadership as Fraser.

In 1928, Farrell was commissioned a Justice of the Peace for Fremantle and was a visiting Justice at Fremantle Prison.

In July 1938, Farrell stepped down as president of the Fremantle Trotting Club. On December 31, 1938, the club hosted a complimentary social event in his honor to express appreciation for his leadership since its formation. The event was attended by prominent community members, including the Mayor of Fremantle, Frank Gibson, who regarded Farrell as a close friend.

As a city councilor and Tramway Board member, he contributed significantly to the ratepayers. In recognition of his efforts, he was re-elected unopposed to both positions for another term.

== Death ==
Farrell died aged 75 years on December 13, 1944, in his home in Fothergill Street, Fremantle, and was buried in the Roman Catholic section of Fremantle Cemetery. Farrell Street in Hilton, Perth, Western Australia is named after him.

=== Legacy ===
Farrell's longstanding involvement in civic affairs, sport, and the administration of horse racing in Fremantle left a significant mark on the district. In recognition of his decades of service to the horse racing, Ascot Racing Club introduced the J. M. Farrell Handicap, an annual race established to commemorate his contribution to the development and governance of the sport.

He was widely regarded by contemporaries as "one of nature's gentlemen," reflecting the esteem in which he was held within the community. Throughout his life, Farrell was active in local sporting circles, particularly in tennis, cricket, rowing, and horse racing, activities that contributed to the cultural and recreational landscape of Fremantle. His participation in philanthropic and charitable initiatives further extended his influence on community development and social welfare in the region.
