= Richard Verrall (academic) =

Professor Richard Verrall (born 1959) is vice-president (strategy & planning) of City, University of London. He took up this post in 2011 and was previously head of the Department of Actuarial Science, then associate dean (research, knowledge transfer and international) of Cass Business School, City, University of London. Professor Verrall joined City, University of London, as a lecturer in 1987.

He is an associate editor of the British Actuarial Journal, the North American Actuarial Journal and Insurance: Mathematics and Economics, and a member of the Economic and Social Research Council (ESRC) College.

Verrall is a Fellow of the Royal Statistical Society (1982), a Chartered Statistician (1993) and an Honorary Fellow of the Institute of Actuaries (1999). According to the authoritative Math Reviews catalogue of the American Mathematical Society, by 2015 he had written or co-written 16 articles in mainstream Actuarial Science journals.

He received an MA in mathematics from St John's College, Cambridge, in 1981, an MSc in statistics from University College London in 1982 and a PhD in the field of actuarial science from City University London in 1989.
