= Lysach O'Ferrall =

Irish Anglican bishop

Lysach Ó Fearghail was an Irish Anglican bishop at the end of the 16th century and the very start of the 17th century.

He was nominated on 4 November 1583; and died on 26 April 1601.
