= John H. Ferrell =

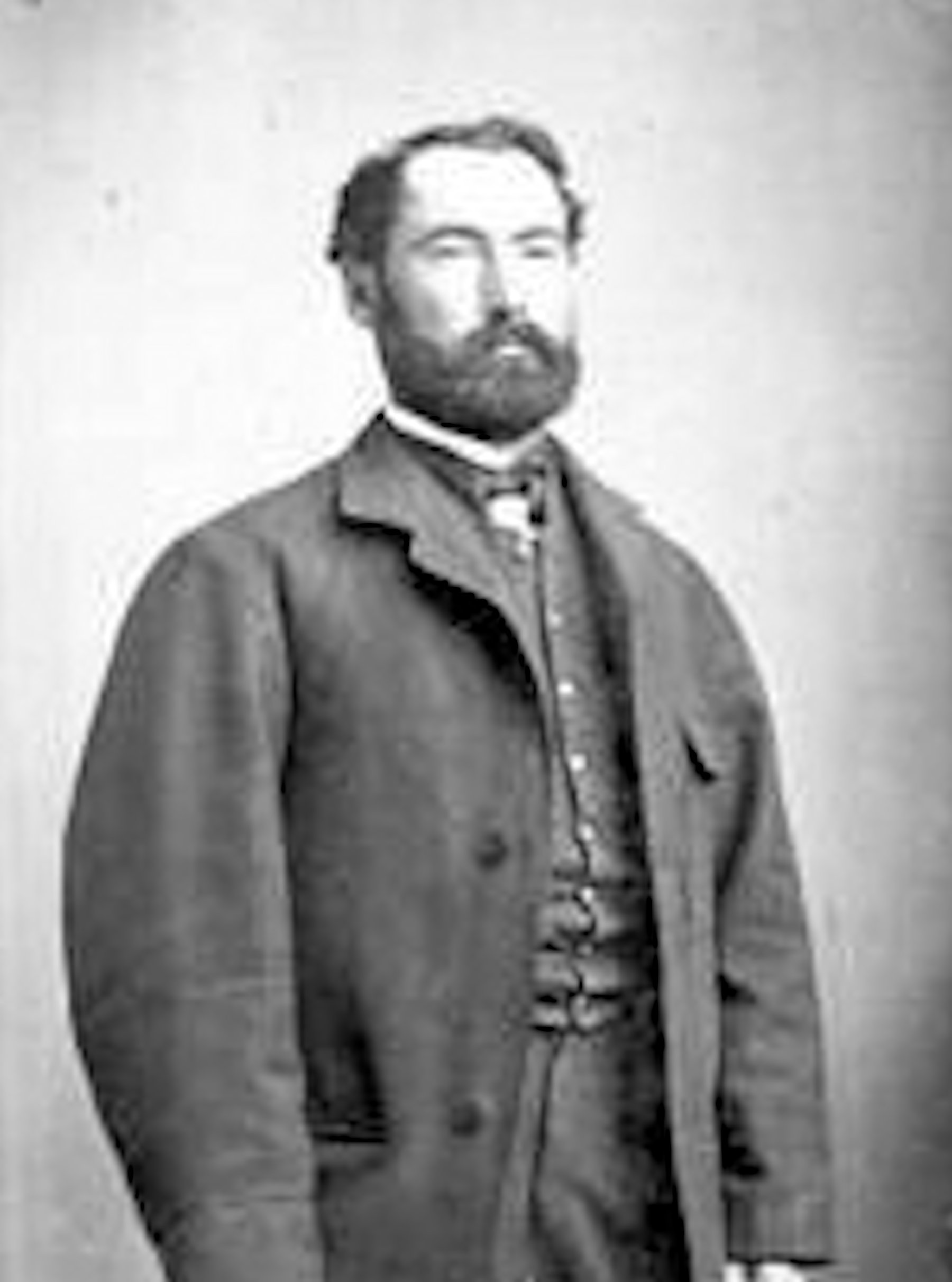
- Medal of Honor winner John H. Ferrell c1865
- Born: April 15, 1829; Bedford County, Tennessee, US
- Died: April 17, 1900 (aged 71)
- Military career
- Allegiance: United States
- Branch: United States Navy (civilian employee)
- Rank: Pilot
- Unit: USS Neosho
- Conflicts: American Civil War
- Awards: Medal of Honor

John H. Ferrell (April 15, 1829 – April 17, 1900) was a civilian employee of the Union Navy during the American Civil War and a recipient of the United States military's highest decoration, the Medal of Honor. He is one of only eight civilians ever to receive the U.S. Medal of Honor.

Born on April 15, 1829, in Bedford County, Tennessee, Ferrell was living in Illinois when he was hired by the Navy as a pilot. By December 6, 1864, he was serving in the Cumberland River aboard the USS Neosho. On that day, during an engagement with Confederates at Bells Mills near Nashville, Tennessee, he and Quartermaster John Ditzenback braved heavy fire to re-raise Neosho's flag after it was shot down. For this action, both he and Ditzenbach were awarded the Medal of Honor six months later, on June 22, 1865.

Ferrell's official Medal of Honor citation reads:

The President of the United States of America, in the name of Congress, takes pleasure in presenting the Medal of Honor to Mr. John H. Ferrell, a United States Civilian, for extraordinary heroism in action on board the U.S. Monitor NEOSHO during the engagement with enemy batteries at Bells Mills, Cumberland River, near Nashville, Tennessee, 6 December 1864. Carrying out his duties courageously during the engagement, Civilian Pilot John Ferrell gallantly left the pilothouse after the flag and signal staffs of that vessel had been shot away and, taking the flag which was drooping over the wheelhouse, make it fast to the stump of the highest mast remaining although the ship was still under a heavy fire from the enemy.

Ferrell died April 17, 1900, at age 71.

== See also ==
- List of American Civil War Medal of Honor recipients: A–F
