= Ferrel =

Ferrel may refer to:

== People ==
- Leonardo Ferrel (1923–2013), Bolivian footballer
- William Ferrel (1817–1891), American meteorologist
- Ferrel Harris (1940–2000), American race car driver
- Beacher Ferrel Hackney (1950–2009?), American suspected murderer

== Places ==
- Ferrel (Peniche), a seaside parish in Peniche, Portugal
- Ferrel Seamount, a seamount in the Pacific Ocean

== Ships ==
- NOAAS Ferrel (S 492), an American survey ship 1968-2002

== See also ==
- Ferrell (disambiguation)
- Ferrol (disambiguation)
