= John O'Farrell =

John O'Farrell may refer to:

- John O'Farrell (author) (born 1962), British author, broadcaster and political campaigner
- John O'Farrell (politician) (1826–1892), Canadian politician
- John O'Farrell (venture capitalist), Irish American venture capitalist
- John A. O'Farrell (1823–1900), Irish American adventurer, miner

== See also ==
- J. T. O'Farrell (died 1971), Irish politician and trade union official
- John Farrell (disambiguation)
