= Ferrol, Virginia =

Unincorporated community in Virginia, United States

Ferrol
- Unincorporated community
- Location within the state of Virginia Ferrol (the United States)
- Coordinates: 38°6′31″N 79°17′7″W
- Country: United States
- State: Virginia
- County: Augusta
- Time zone: UTC−5 (Eastern (EST))
  - Summer (DST): UTC−4 (EDT)

Ferrol is a small unincorporated community in Augusta County, Virginia, United States, near Staunton.

== Nearby places in Virginia ==
Mount Elliott Springs (2.0 km), Augusta Springs (3.0 km), Chapin (4.5 km), Summerdean (4.5 km), North Mountain (5.8 km), McKinley (7.4 km), Trimbles Mill (6.5 km), Estaline (8.1 km), Buffalo Gap (9.6 km), Middlebrook (8.9 km), Swoope (8.8 km), Christian (9.6 km), Fordwick (8.7 km), Craigsville (9.2 km), Little Baltimore (11.9 km).
