= Ferral =

Civil parish in Montalegre

Coordinates: 41°41′59″N 7°59′30″W

Ferral is a freguesia (civil parish) in the municipality of Montalegre, Vila Real District, Portugal. It is 15.83 km^{2} (6.11 mi^{2}) in area.

In 2011, it contained 397 inhabitants; population density, 25.1 inhabitants/km^{2}.

The Ponte da Mizarela over the Rabagão River connects it with the freguesia of Ruivães, Vieira do Minho, Braga District.
