= Remote Sensing of Environment =

Academic journal

- Discipline: Remote sensing
- Language: English
- Edited by: Jing. M. Chen, Menghua Wang, Marie Weiss

Publication details
- History: 1969–present
- Publisher: Elsevier
- Frequency: 16/year

Standard abbreviations
- ISO 4: Remote Sens. Environ.

Indexing
- CODEN: RSEEA7
- ISSN: 0034-4257 (print); 1879-0704 (web)
- LCCN: 75008138

Links
- Journal homepage; Online access

Remote Sensing of Environment is an academic journal of remote sensing published by Elsevier. The journal was established in 1969 by Elsevier. Its editors-in-chief are Jing. M. Chen, Menghua Wang, and Marie Weiss.

It has three companion journals: Science of Remote Sensing, Remote Sensing Applications: Society and Environment, and the International Journal of Applied Earth Observation and Geoinformation.

== Abstracting and indexing ==
The journal is indexed and abstracted in the following bibliographic databases:

- Academic Search Premier
- Aerospace Database
- Agricultural & Environmental Science Database
- Applied Science & Technology Source
- Aquatic Sciences and Fisheries Abstracts
- BIOSIS
- Biotechnology Research Abstracts
- CAB Abstracts
- Civil Engineering Abstracts
- Communication Abstracts
- Compendex
- Computer & Applied Sciences
- DIALNET
- Environment Index
- GEOBASE
- INSPEC
- Metadex
- PASCAL
- Pollution Abstracts
- Science Citation Index Expanded
- Scopus
- Veterinary Science Database

According to Journal Citation Reports, its 2019 impact factor is 9.085.
