= Thomas J. Flynn =

United States Army general (1930–2025)

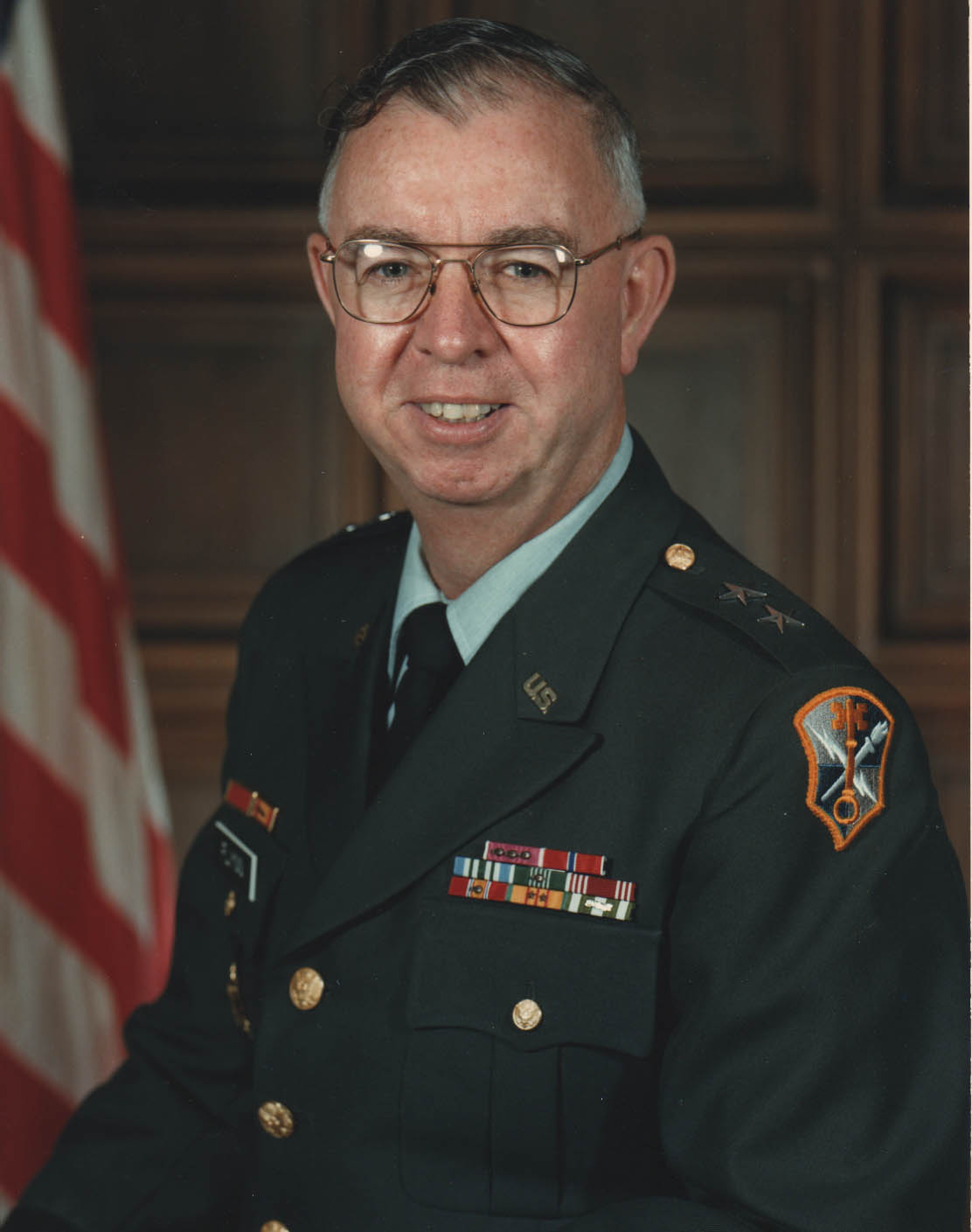
- Born: 2 November 1930; Corning, New York U.S.
- Died: 22 June 2025 (aged 94)
- Military career
- Allegiance: United States
- Branch: United States Army
- Service years: 1952–1985
- Rank: Major General
- Nickname: Tom
- Commands: Deputy Commander Army Intelligence and Security Command; Assistant Deputy Director for Operations/Deputy Chief of Central Security Service, National Security Agency; Army Security Agency Field Station, Augsburg, Germany; 175th Radio Research Field Station
- Conflicts: Vietnam War
- Awards: Legion of Merit (4); Bronze Star Medal

Thomas Joseph Flynn (2 November 1930 – 22 June 2025) was a major general in the United States Army. His assignments included Deputy Commander Army Intelligence and Security Command as well as Assistant Deputy Director for Operations/Deputy Chief of Central Security Service for the National Security Agency. Flynn enlisted in the Army in October 1952 after graduating from the University of Toronto with a B.A. degree in biology. He was commissioned in 1954 from Infantry Officer Candidate School. Flynn is also a graduate of the Army Command and General Staff College and the Air War College. Flynn died on 22 June 2025, at the age of 94.
