= Thomas J. Farrell (medievalist) =

American medievalist

Thomas J. Farrell is an American medievalist. A professor of English and head of the English department at Stetson University, Florida, he specializes in Geoffrey Chaucer. Farrell, holder of a Ph.D. from the University of Michigan, is a contributing editor for the Sources & Analogues of the Canterbury Tales (2002) and editor of Bakhtin and Medieval Voices (1996).
