= Brett O'Farrell (Australian rules footballer) =

Australian rules footballer

Personal information
- Full name: Brett O'Farrell
- Born: 3 January 1978 (age 48)
- Original team: Prahran U-18/East Sandringham
- Draft: 14th, 1996 AFL draft
- Height: 197 cm (6 ft 6 in)
- Weight: 100 kg (220 lb)

Playing career^{1}
Years	Club	Games (Goals)
1998	Sydney	12 (10)
1999–2001	Hawthorn	9 (5)
Total		21 (15)
- ^{1} Playing statistics correct to the end of 2001.

Career highlights
- VFL premiership player: 2001

Brett O'Farrell (born 3 January 1978) is a former Australian rules footballer who played with Sydney and Hawthorn in the Australian Football League (AFL).

At Under-18 level, O'Farrell played for Prahran and it was from there that he was recruited by Sydney with the 14th selection of the 1996 AFL draft, a pick which had been received as part of the Anthony Rocca trade. He spent a season in the reserves before making his debut in 1998, filling in for ruckman Greg Stafford. O'Farrell, who kicked a goal with his first kick in the AFL, performed well enough to hold his place in the side for the finals series.

He was traded to Hawthorn in the 1998 AFL draft, to serve as an understudy to ruckman and forward Paul Salmon. However O'Farrell suffered numerous injuries during his time at Hawthorn and was not able to put together more than nine appearances.
