= History of Marino =

History of the municipality of Marino, Italy

The history of the city of Marino, in the province of Rome, in the Roman Castles area, begins with the appearance of the first human settlements in the municipal territory during the Bronze Age. In the Middle Ages the castle knew its period of greatest splendor under the rule successively of the Counts of Tusculum, the Frangipane, the Orsini, the Apostolic Chamber, the Caetani, and finally the Colonna, of whom it was a historic stronghold. Marinese events have often been of considerable importance in the local and sometimes even international historical context, so much so that several scholars in various eras have tried their hand at collecting the historical memories of this town. The castle was besieged several times, with mixed results, suffering at least four sackings and two destructions a fundamentis. However, the feudal lords and the community have been concerned at all times to erect monuments for public ornament, such as the only example of Gothic architecture in the Roman Castles, the former church of Santa Lucia (13th century), the sanctuary of Santa Maria dell'Acquasanta (13th century), the Frangipane (12th century) and Orsini (14th century) fortresses, Palazzo Colonna (15th-17th century), the collegiate basilica of San Barnaba (17th century), Palazzo Matteotti (19th century), and many other public works. Numerous important personalities in politics, the arts, religion, and finance were also born, lived, or related in some way in Marino.

== Ancient age ==
=== The pre-Roman period ===
The first human settlements identified in the Marino territory date back to the 1st millennium B.C.: in fact, at the localities Riserva del Truglio and Costa Caselle, on the edge of the municipal territory towards Grottaferrata and Rocca di Papa, some burials belonging to a necropolis dated around the Latian period III were found (770 B.C.-730 B.C.E.). Other necropolises dating to the pre-Roman period were found in the early decades of the twentieth century in the Campofattore, Monte Crescenzo and Pascolari localities of Castel Gandolfo.

Some archaeologists and historians have argued that at Barco Colonna, at the foot of the modern historic center, Caput Aquae Ferentinum along with Locus Ferentinum, i.e., the place where the delegates of the Latin League gathered in the days of the Prisci Latini -located at the legendary capital of Alba Longa-, would have once stood. Only recently has the location of the Locus Ferentinus been proposed near the hamlet of Cecchina in Albano Laziale. Finds related to the Locus Ferentinae, already identified by the nineteenth-century scholar and archaeologist Girolamo Torquati, have now largely been lost.

Roughly near the present hamlets of Frattocchie and Due Santi the city of Bovillae must have risen as early as the pre-Roman age: its foundation is shrouded in mystery, and placed certainly during the period of existence of the legendary Latin capital of Alba Longa, of which Bovillae was probably a colony. The city in any case would reach its prosperity in the early period of Roman rule, until about the first century BC.

Not far from Bovillae, near the present hamlet of Santa Maria delle Mole, the location of the pre-Roman settlement of Mugillae has been identified, the residence of a branch of the Papiria gens and in the Republican period the home of at least three consuls: it was probably destroyed by the Volsci of Gnaeus Marcius Coriolanus in 490 B.C. and has never been mentioned since then. Today the archaeological area is at risk of unrestrained urbanization.

=== Roman rule ===
==== The monarchical period ====
The conventional date of the destruction of the city of Alba Longa by the Romans, ruled by Rome's third king Tullus Hostilius, is 668 B.C.: in this year Latium vetus, that is, the forty-seven cities confederated in the Latin League, were de facto subjugated to Rome, which formed an ever-stronger bond with them until all their political autonomy was completely stifled.

The population of the destroyed Alban capital that was not deported to Rome apparently took up residence in the former colony of Bovillae, and also in Bovillae revived the ancient Latin religious institutions of the Virgines Albanae or the Pontifices Albani and the Salii Albani. Therefore, the inhabitants of the city in the monarchical and republican ages were called Albani Longani Bovillenses, boasting direct descent from the legendary Alban capital.

==== The Republican Period ====
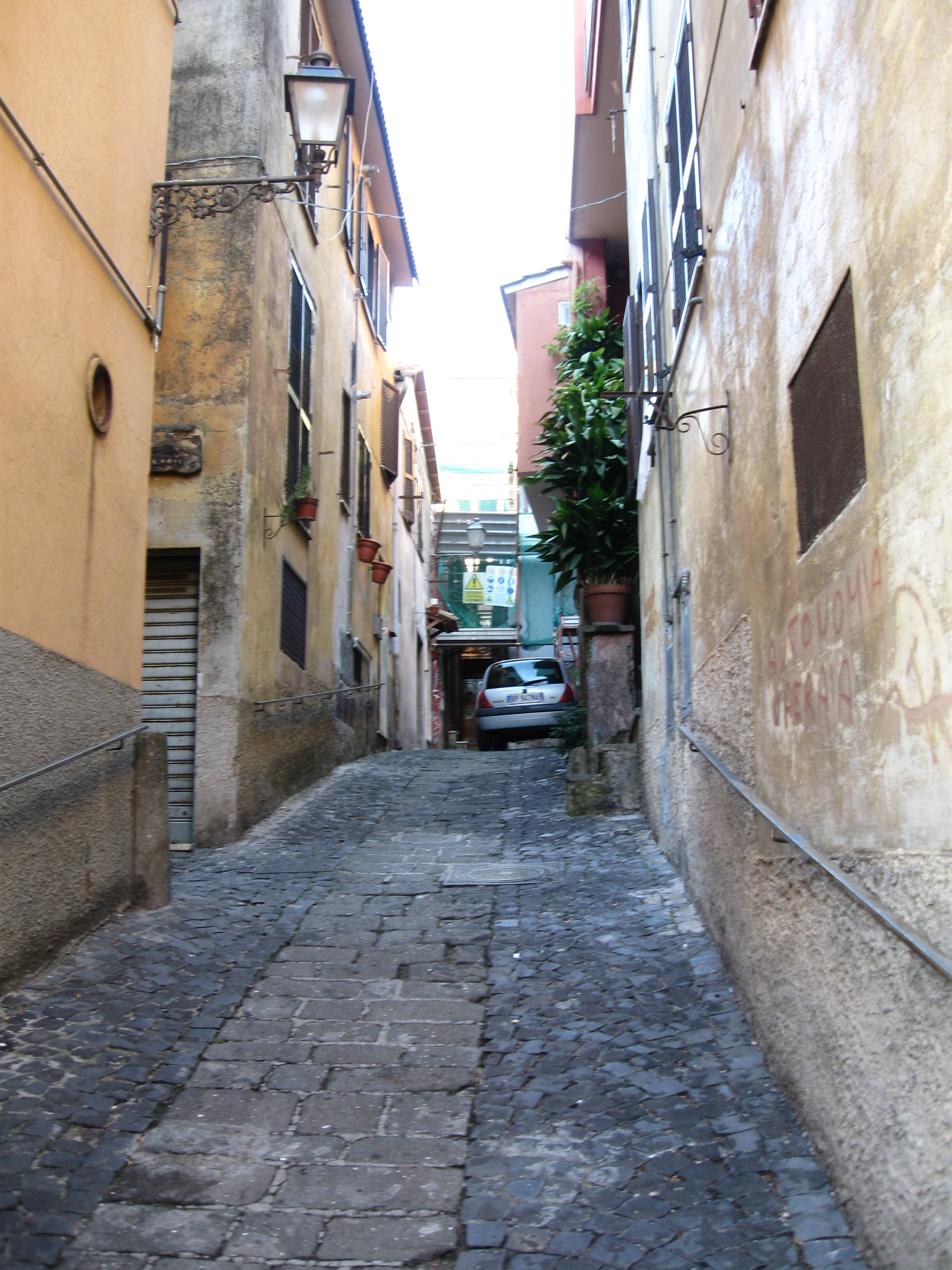
An alley in the Castelletto district in Marino's historic center.

In 490 BC. Gnaeus Marcius Coriolanus, at the head of a menacing army of Volsci, besieged and sacked numerous cities in the Ager Romanus loyal to Rome, and among them Mugillae, an ancient settlement located a short distance from Bovillae near present-day Santa Maria delle Mole, and Bovillae itself, which put up valiant resistance against him but nevertheless was plundered of its considerable wealth.

In 312 B.C., when the censor Appius Claudius Caecus had the construction of the Appian Way begun by tracing the ancient route between Rome and Campania, which already passed through Bovillae, the city became a taberna midway between Rome and the prima statio, Aricia.

At the end of the troubled civil war between Marius and Sulla (86 B.C.-82 B.C.E.), after the battle of the Colline Gate (November 2, 82 B.C.E.) and the rise to power of Lucius Cornelius Sulla, the lex Sullana was enacted, which ordered the centuriation and distribution to his veteran soldiers of the lands south of Rome included between Bovillae, Castrimoenium -the present Marino, of precisely Sillan foundation- and Tusculum. These areas had been the stronghold of the followers of Gaius Marius and later Gaius Marius the Younger, and the decision to install loyalists to the nascent Sillan dictatorship there was certainly not a random choice. From this moment in history, the slow decline of Bovillae began: even Marcus Tullius Cicero, in his oration Pro Plancio, states that in his day hardly a Bovillian delegate showed up at the religious meetings of the Latin League.

As already mentioned, in the Republican age in the territory of the first district of Marino arose the Roman colony -then municipium- of Castrimoenium, as confirmed by Gaius Plinius Secundus in the Naturalis Historia and Sextus Julius Frontinus, in De Coloniis. The existence of Castrimoenium is proven by numerous inscriptions and tombstones found throughout the territory of the first district of Marino, which would lead to the exclusion of the coincidence of Castrimoenium with the Castra Albana founded around 183 by Septimius Severus in the place of the present-day city of Albano Laziale, a coincidence assumed by some historians. The archaeological controversy thus revolves around the location of the castrum in question near the locality Castel de' Paolis -at the municipal borders with Grottaferrata and Ciampino- or near the historic center of Marino, in the Castelletto district. Both place names have to do with the ancient toponym, and in both places abundant finds of Roman materials have been made: however, while for Castel de' Paolis the Roman remains are believed to belong to a suburban villa of the imperial age owned by the patrician family of Scribonii-Libones, for Castelletto it is more plausible that a settlement of military origin such as Castrimoenium stood there, since much of the current alleys of the ward retain the characteristic orthogonality of Roman castra.

On January 20, 52 BC. Publius Clodius Pulcher, a political opponent for the ascension to the consulship of Titus Annius Milo, was slaughtered by the latter's assassins near the taberna of Bovillae, not far from his own villa identified today at the villa of the Pontifical North American College in the locality of Ercolano in Castel Gandolfo. Clodius' body was carried on the shoulders of his supporters to the taberna of Bovillae, where it was exposed to popular piety before the public funeral services held in the Roman Forum.

==== The imperial period ====
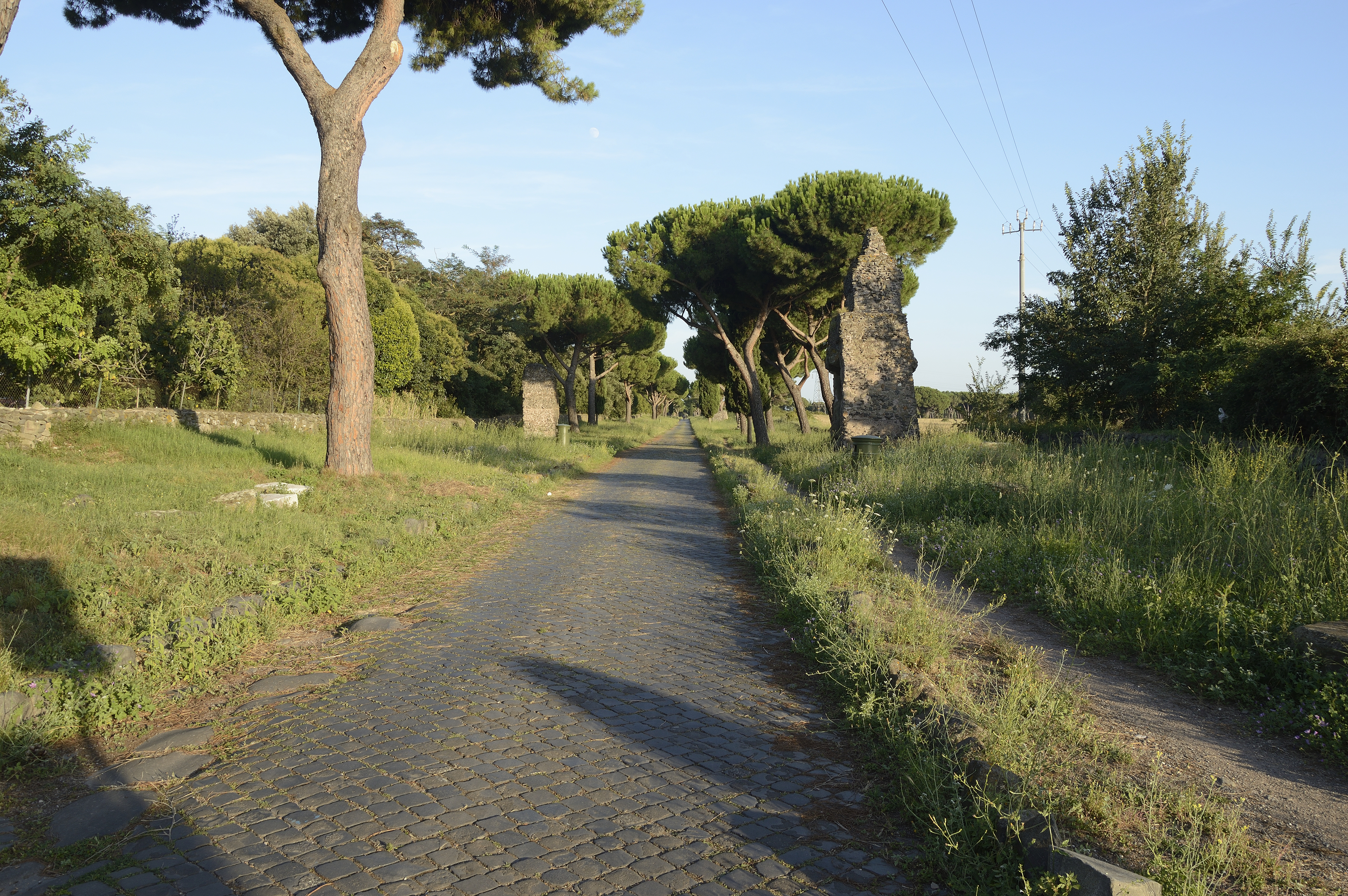
The Old Appian Way near Santa Maria delle Mole.

In the days immediately following Octavian Augustus's death in Nola on August 19, 14, a massive funeral procession set out from the Campanian city and traveled all the way north along the Appian Way to Rome. The body was also displayed in Bovillae, where the decurions -the supreme magistracy of the municipium- delivered it to the equites who had come from Rome to bring the deceased Augustus to the capital. In 17 Augustus's successor in the government of the Roman Empire, Tiberius Claudius Nero, ordered that the Julio-Claudian dynasty and the memory of his stepfather be celebrated in Bovillae, the supposed place of origin of the Gens Iulia, with the solemn Sodales Augustales. For this purpose the imposing circus, theater and shrine of the Gens Iulia were built.

The remains of many suburban patrician villas have been found in the territory of Marino. Perhaps the most monumental villa is the one that provided the basis for the medieval structure of Castrum Pauli, at Castel de' Paolis, near the town of Grottaferrata: it is attributed to the patrician Scribonii-Libones family. Another large villa was found in 1880 during the construction works of the Rome-Albano railway: it was excavated in 1884 by Luigi Boccanera and attributed to Quintus Voconius Pollonius: its surface area is estimated at 103 meters x 70, and some archaeological finds were found inside it, such as the Apollo Pythius now preserved by the Province of Rome. Two other villas of the imperial age were identified by Thomas Ashby and later by Alban archaeologist Giuseppe Lugli at Torraccio of Due Santi.

A possessio Marinas, identifiable with the present town of Marino, appears in the Liber Pontificalis, among the goods included in the donation made by Constantine the Great to the cathedral basilica of St. John the Baptist in Albano Laziale, dating from the pontificate of Pope Sylvester I (314-335).

== The Middle Ages ==
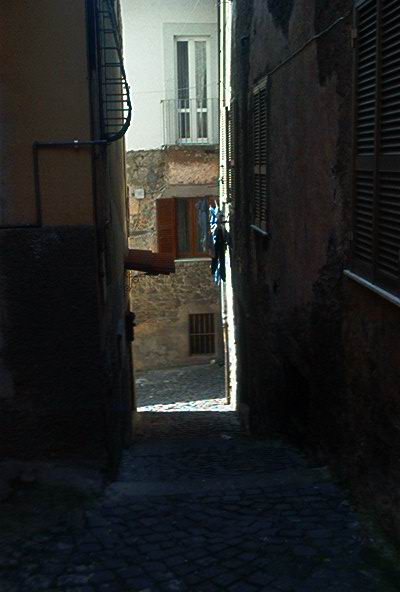
An alley in the Santa Lucia district.

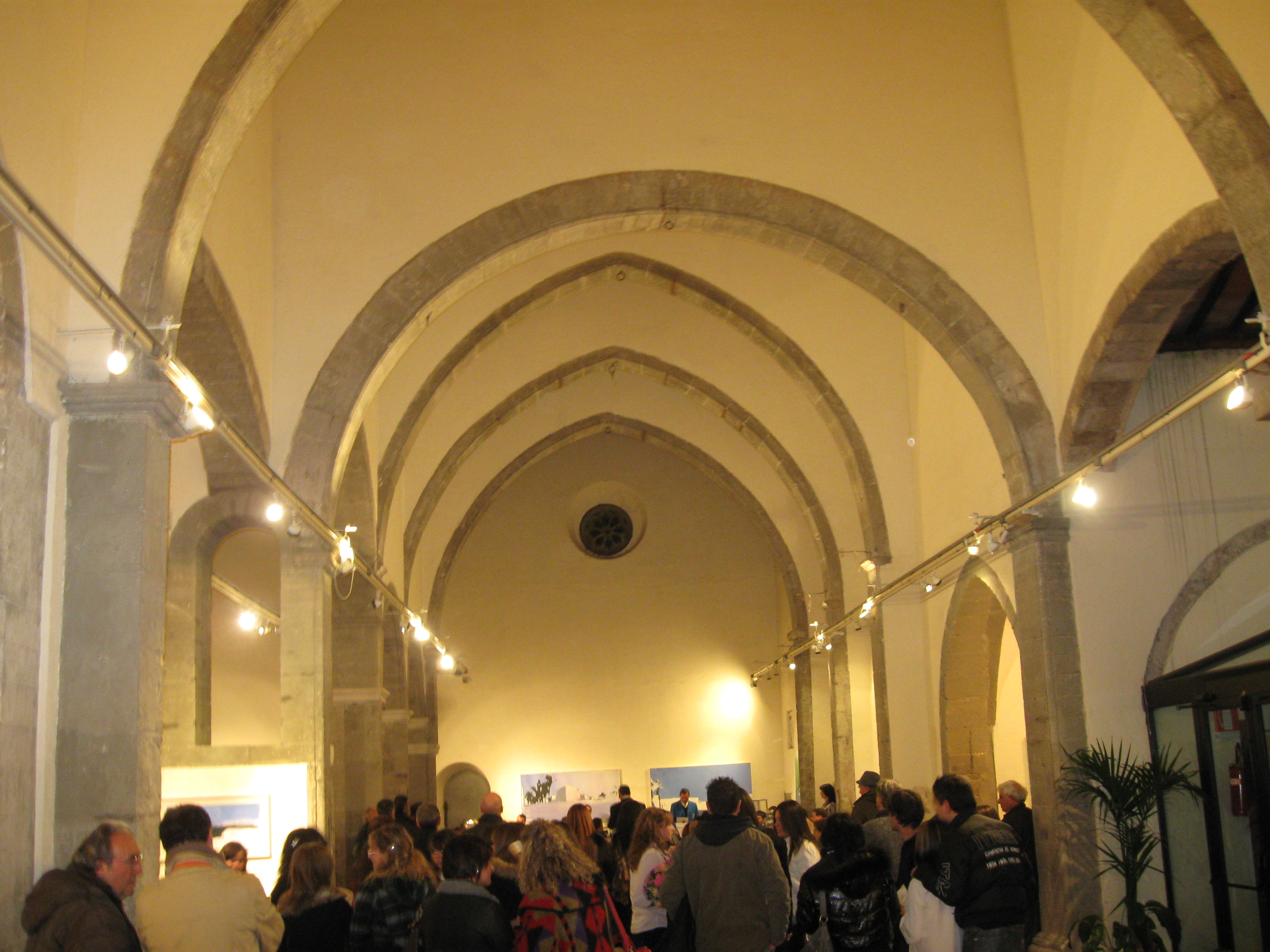
The nave of the former Santa Lucia Church, now the Umberto Mastroianni Civic Museum.

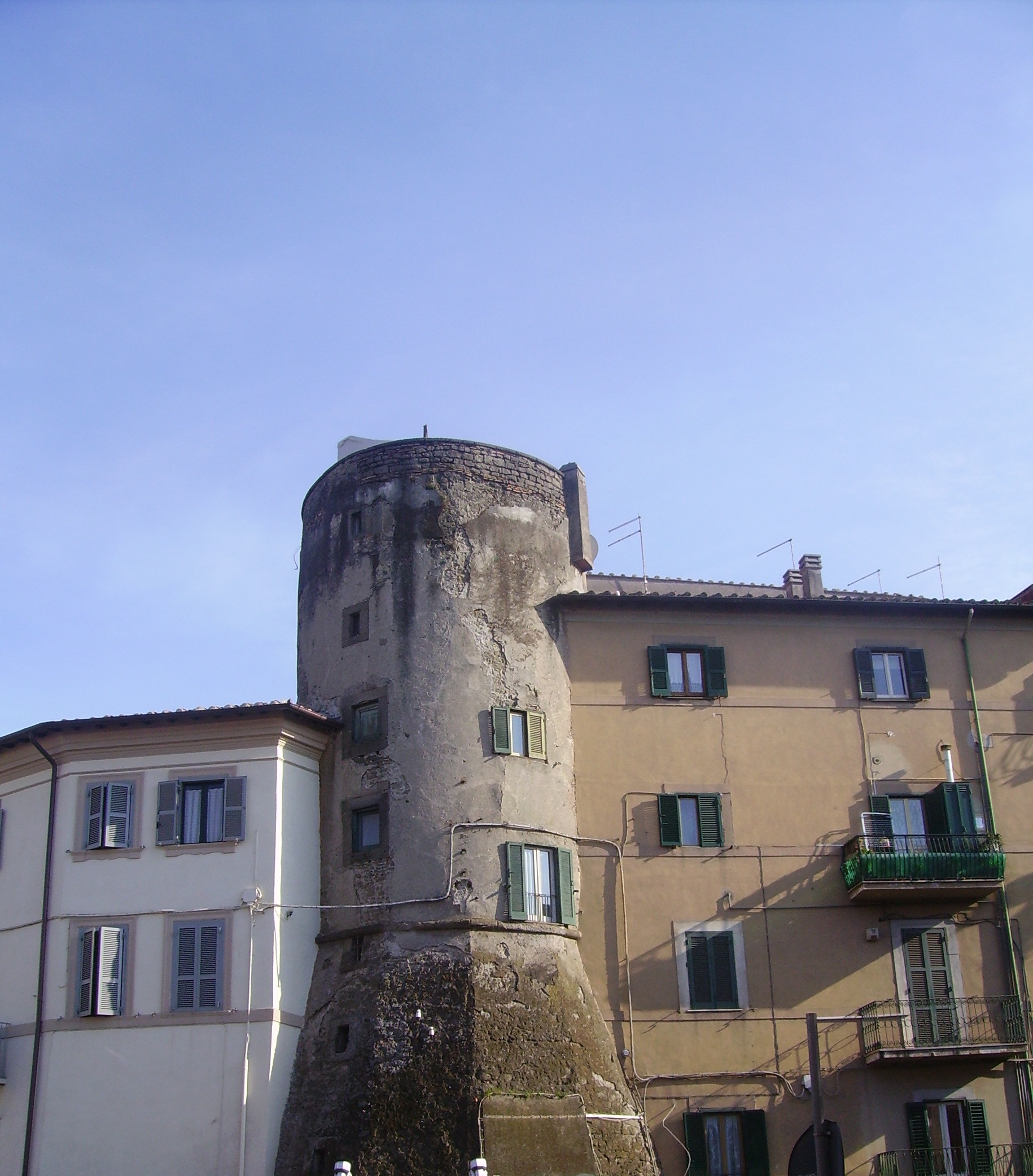
Another of the three round towers in Giacomo Matteotti Square.

=== From the early Middle Ages to the 13th century ===
The first mention of a possessio Marinas identifiable with the present town of Marino appears in the Liber Pontificalis, among the goods included in the donation made by Constantine the Great to the cathedral basilica of St. John the Baptist in Albano Laziale, dating back to the pontificate of Pope Sylvester I (314-335).

The castrum Marinei, however, is mentioned with certainty in a passage of the Chronicon Sublacense dating from 1090 -but according to some scholars interpolated later- among the goods granted by Agapetus I of the Counts of Tusculum as a dowry to a daughter of Oddone Frangipane. In any case, the first irrefutable mention of Marino dates back to 1114, in a deed of sale of some houses in Rome initialed by a "Tedemarius abitatoris in castro qui vocatur Mareni."

From its origins, therefore, Marino was a fortified place. The first urban nucleus is traditionally identified with the Castelletto district, probably heir to the ancient military colony of Castrimoenium: in fact, the streets maintain a certain orthogonality and it is also possible to identify what would be the cardo and decumanus of the ancient Roman encampment, namely Via San Giovanni -crossed in the final stretch by a suggestive archway- and Via Sant'Antonio. The first parish church was that of St. John the Baptist, deconsecrated in the seventeenth century and now completely destroyed, and identified with exactitude only recently by the scholar Vincenzo Antonelli thanks to some elements present in an inner courtyard of via San Giovanni.

In the late Middle Ages the village expanded progressively southeastward along the peperino hill on whose summit -373 m a.s.l., today Piazza Giacomo Matteotti- the Frangipane family had a four-sided fortress built, demolished at an unspecified time and of which three round towers remain incorporated in the surrounding buildings. The new expansion corresponds to the present districts of Santa Lucia and Coste, and was traversed by the important thoroughfare of Via Santa Lucia and Via Posta Vecchia: the denomination of the latter street denounces that most likely this was originally the route of the courier and postal route between Rome and Naples, which passed through Marino until the 1780s.

A new parish church was built, the church of Santa Lucia, which was deconsecrated along with the other parish church of San Giovanni in the seventeenth century and repurposed for secular use in later centuries until it became the site of the Umberto Mastroianni Civic Museum. The church rose in the 12th century on an abandoned Roman cistern, and was rebuilt in the 13th century probably on commission of the feudal lady Jacoba of Settesoli, in Italian Gothic style (it is the only example of Cistercian Gothic style in the Roman Castles).

The circle of walls in the late medieval period encompassed both the Castelletto and the new expansion; to the northwest it ran along present-day Via Massimo d'Azeglio, to the east along present-day Via Giuseppe Garibaldi and Corso Trieste, to the southeast the Rocca Frangipane marked the entrance to the castle for those coming from Albano Laziale or from Frascati, Rocca di Papa and Velletri, while to the west the Coste district was naturally bounded by the deep ravine of the peperino quarries. At least two gates opened in the walls during this phase: porta Romana, heading north, and the outer gate of Rocca Frangipane, which accommodated the tracks coming from west, east and south.

Even today there is still a strong trace of the medieval circle of walls in toponymy: the modern urban sprawl of the Borgo Garibaldi district, outside Porta Romana to the north, is called For de porta, while the houses located along Via Giuseppe Garibaldi and Corso Trieste are For de mura; finally, Piazza Giacomo Matteotti is still 'a Porta.

The Castelletto district and the Santa Lucia district, squeezed around their respective parish churches, each had the right to an oven and a slaughterhouse, as evidenced by some street place names such as Via dei Forni di Santa Lucia and Via dei Forni di Sant'Antonio.

=== The 14th century ===
I would almost like to say that fortunate was that City that had the good fortune to be governed not by the most just and peaceful Prince but by the strongest, and most overbearing who managed to spare it from devastation, and from fires. How true it is that the very little that survived the fury of the Barbarians was irreparably destroyed by the Lords of the thirteenth, fourteenth, and fifteenth centuries, who in the act of destruction not only emulated, but overcame the Barbarians themselves.

— Girolamo Torquati, Studi storico-archeologici sulla città e sul territorio di Marino, vol. I cap. XIX p. 174.

In the 14th century, the defensive system of Marino's historic center was expanded. The castle had grown in importance: in 1267 Arrigo di Castiglia, senator of the city of Rome and a fierce Ghibelline, besieged the Guelph Rainaldo Orsini in Marino, but was unable to conquer the position since Rainaldo "in castro Marini non sine audace promptitudine receptavit." In 1347 the tribune Cola di Rienzo, in an attempt to debilitate the rebellious Roman barons, pushed on to Marino to besiege Rainaldo and Giordano Orsini there: the castle resisted, so much so that Cola had to fall back on the more affordable castle of Castelluccia; however, the economic damage caused by the transit of Cola's army was enormous for the fiefdom. This is how the Anonymous Roman in the Cronica reports of the siege of Marino.

The castle of Marino suffered a third massive siege within the same century, during the war between Pope Urban VI and the antipope Clement VII that followed the Western Schism: on April 29, 1379, in fact, the papal army commanded by Alberico da Barbiano and composed of Italian mercenaries confronted the anti-papal army of French mercenaries led by the Count of Montjoie, and they faced each other in the Battle of Marino, fought in the valley east of the town towards Grottaferrata -today known as the Valley of the Dead, perhaps because of this bloody battle-. Victory went to the Italians, and the antipope Clement VII was forced to leave Italy and take refuge in Avignon. The castle of Marino, ruled by Giordano Orsini, a supporter of the antipope, was besieged by papal troops led by Giordano's own son Giacomo Orsini, who stormed his father's castle on June 2, 1379.

Throughout all these military upheavals, the circle of walls would be rearranged, enriched by a moat -in 1269 the Cistercian monks of the convent of Santa Maria ad Nives of Palazzolo turned out to be landowners in Marino in the locality of "Boccafossati."- and enlarged, towards the east with the so-called "New Chambers" and with the opening of a new gate towards Rome and towards Grottaferrata, Porta Giordana -probably so named in honor of the feudatory Giordano Orsini-. Moreover, downstream from the Coste district, along the course of the Marana delle Pietrare near the peperino quarries, the tower of Ammonte was built, which could not be ruled out as part of a larger defensive system downstream, as hypothesized by the scholar Giuseppe Tomassetti.

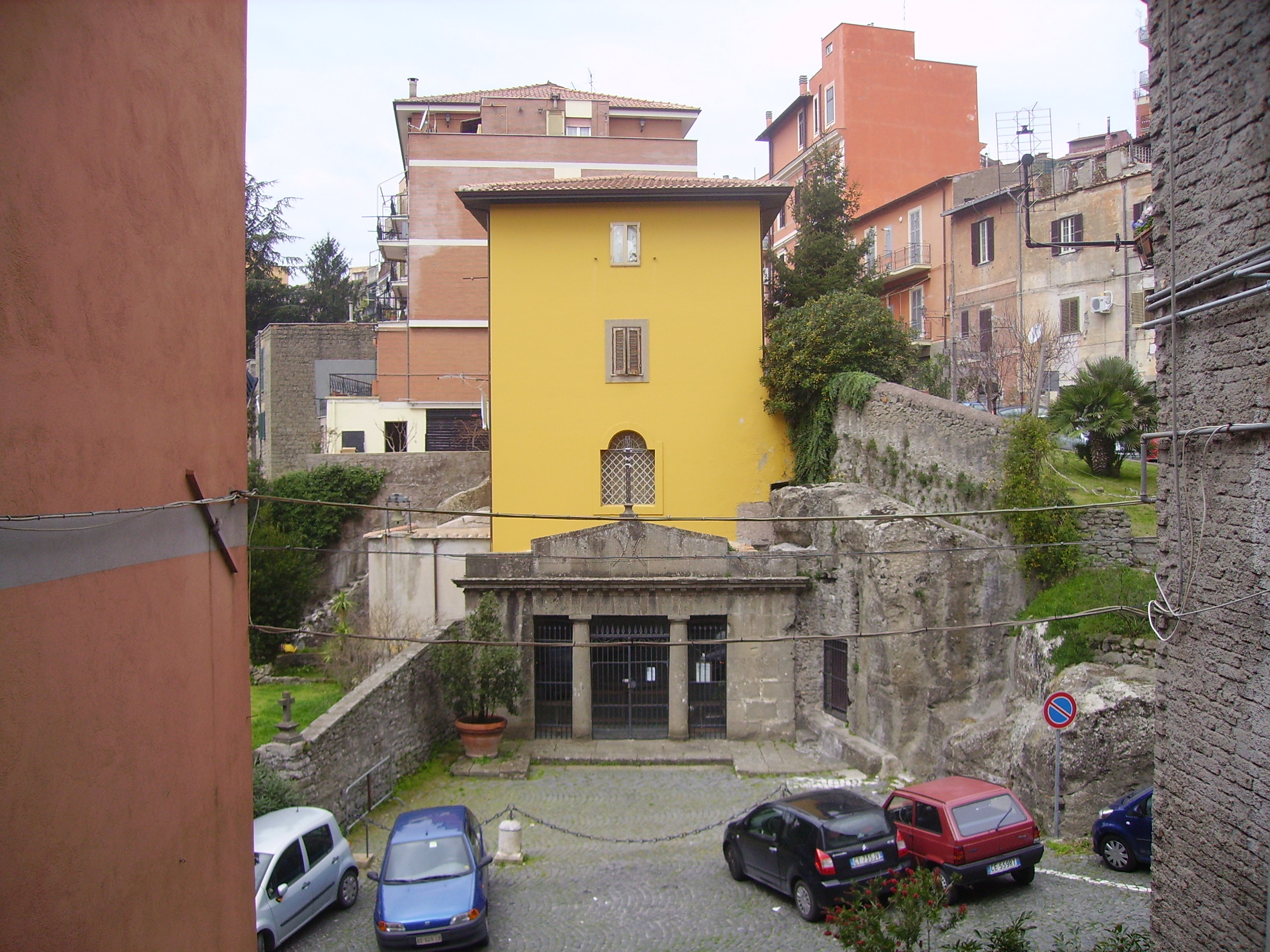
The sanctuary of Santa Maria dell'Acquasanta.

Throughout the forty years of the Western Schism (1379-1417) Marino was subjected to numerous sieges and counter-besieges by the opposing warring factions. As mentioned above, in 1379 the castle had been conquered by Giacomo Orsini, who drove out his father Giordano: the latter took shelter with his nephew Onorato Caetani, who was anti-papal like his uncle. Upon Giordano Orsini's death in 1384, Giacomo was declared an illegitimate son and Onorato proclaimed universal heir to his uncle's fiefs: therefore, as early as 1385 Giacomo Orsini was driven out of Marino by Onorato with arms. However, in 1399 Pope Boniface IX called a crusade against the Caetani family guilty of plotting against him, and Marino was occupied by papal troops and annexed to the fiefs of the Reverend Apostolic Chamber as a casteliania. In 1404 the castellan Pietro Passerelli tried to declare himself independent, but by 1405 Marino had already been occupied again by papal troops. In the same year, however, the castle was occupied by none other than Giacomo Orsini, whose sovereignty, however, did not last long, for in 1408 the King of Naples Ladislaus I of Naples, who was invading the Church State in order to seize it, annexed the fief of Marino to the property of the Neapolitan crown before granting it to his allies Giordano and Niccolò Colonna. At the end of the Neapolitan invasion, the fiefdom would return under the rule of the Apostolic Chamber until 1413, the year of a new Neapolitan invasion that saw Giacomo Orsini, siding with the Neapolitans, seize the castle. But even this time, with the death of King Ladislaus I of Naples on August 6, 1413, Giacomo finally lost dominion of the castle, which reverted to the Caetani family, under whose rule it remained until the Colonna family purchased the fief in 1417.

In all these events, the defensive system of the historic center suffered considerable setbacks, and it became necessary to build a new fortress that could withstand assaults better than the old 13th-century fortress of the Frangipane. The captain of arms of the Holy Roman Church Paolo Orsini, during one of the periods of ecclesiastical domination of the fiefdom, thus ordered the construction of the so-called Rocca Orsini fortress, located in the center of the town, halfway between the Santa Lucia district, the Coste district and the Castelletto district, in the same place -and on the same foundations- as the present Colonna Palace. It is also speculated that the 14th-century Orsini fortress arose by incorporating an ancient 11th-century fortification built at the time of the rule of the Counts of Tusculum.

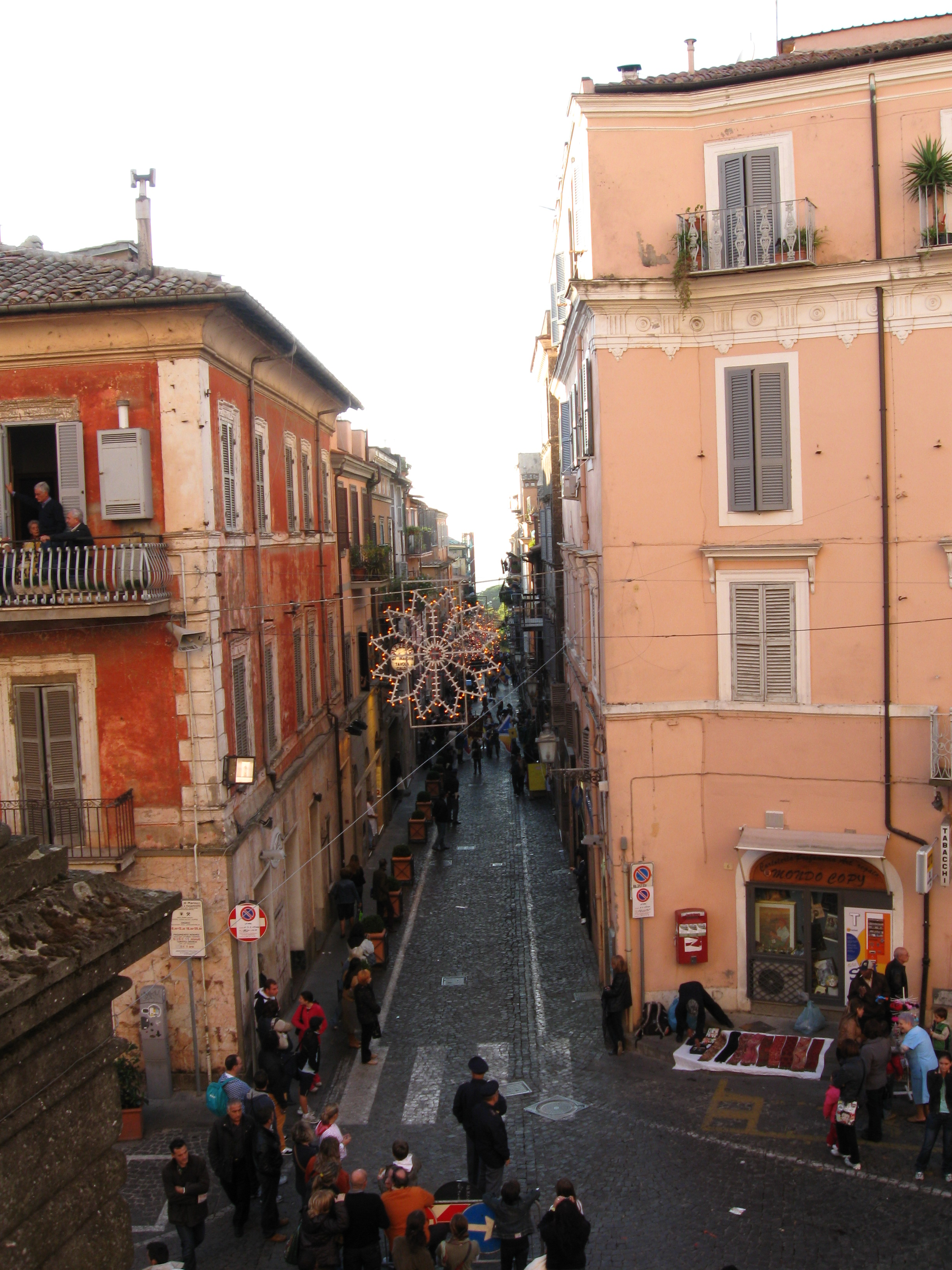
Via Roma from the staircase of Palazzo Colonna.

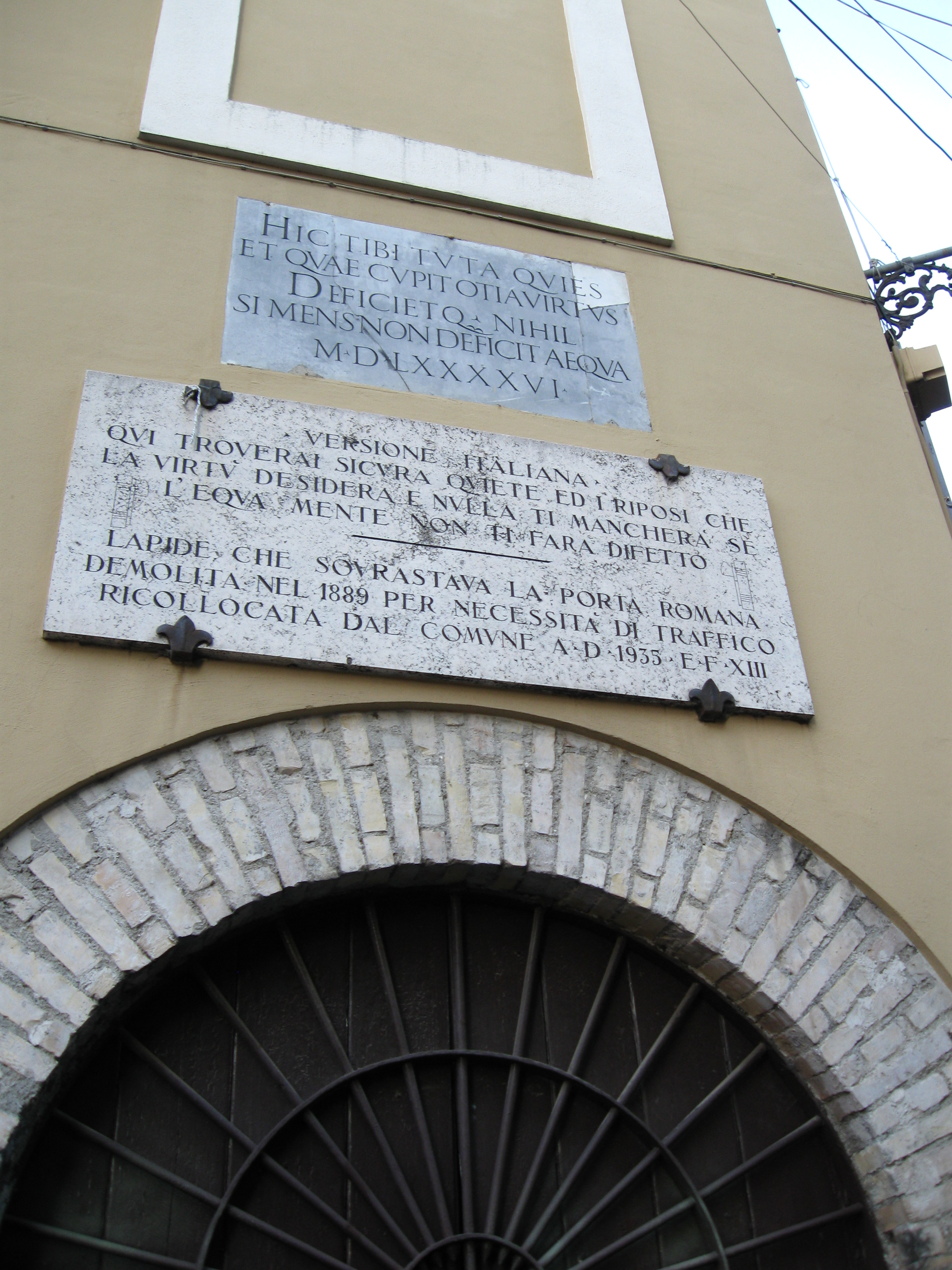
A memorial plaque affixed to the site of the destroyed Roman gate, the main access to the castle coming from Rome.

=== From the 15th to the 16th century ===
In 1417, the fiefdom of Marino was purchased for 12,000 florins by Giordano and Lorenzo Colonna. During the years of Pope Martin V's pontificate (1417 - 1431) the fiefdom experienced a period of peace and economic recovery. After the death of Martin V, however, his successor Pope Eugene IV took an all-out stand against the now very powerful Colonnas: on May 18, 1431 they were excommunicated and called by the pope "improba domus sive progenies de Columna"; pardoned upon payment of the modest sum of 35. 000 florins. However, Antonio Colonna of Riofreddo reserved actions against the Pope at the Council of Basel -which supported any action against Eugene IV- and refused to pay another 30,000 florins into papal coffers. This infuriated Eugene IV, who again excommunicated the Colonnas in 1433 and seized their property, but he was forced to flee abruptly from Rome to Florence pressed by the armed insurrection of Rome's leading baronial families, from the Prefetti di Vico to the Savelli allies of Colonna. The captain of arms of the Holy Roman Church Orso Orsini in 1434 went as far as the walls of Marino in pursuit of the captain of fortune Antonio da Pontedera in the pay of the barons. In May 1436 the cardinal archbishop of Florence Giovanni Maria Vitelleschi, commander of a powerful papal army, also arrived at the foot of Marino but did not want to besiege the castle, preferring to sack and raze the nearby castles of Borghetto di Grottaferrata, Castel Gandolfo, Castel Savello and Albano Laziale, all fiefs of the Savelli family. The Colonnas were hit hard and defeated by Vitelleschi with the conquest and legendary savage destruction from the ground up of their stronghold of Palestrina in August 1436. With the defeat of the Colonna, their fiefs were annexed by the Apostolic Chamber and so remained the situation until the death of Pope Eugene IV on June 26, 1448.

In 1453 a dispute was raised over the eastern borders of the fiefdoms of Marino and Rocca di Papa between Antonio, Odoardo and Cardinal Prospero Colonna on the one hand and the Abbey of Santa Maria di Grottaferrata on the other. Pope Nicholas V appointed a papal commissioner ad acta on October 26.

Marino Castle was again involved in a war in 1482, this time fought between Pope Sixtus IV and the King of Naples Ferrante of Aragon. The Colonna and Savelli sided openly with the Neapolitans, commanded by the Duke of Calabria Alfonso of Aragon, who on June 5, 1482 occupied the Borghetto of Grottaferrata and openly threatened Rome with raids in the Ager Romanus: in one of these raids, thirteen Marinese were captured and imprisoned in the prisons of Tor di Nona, with a promise of liberation upon payment of a ransom of 110 ducats. Alfonso of Aragon decided to "unload" the cumbersome Colonna ally and on July 16 occupied the town of Marino, imprisoning Lorenzo Colonna: the Rocca Orsini, however, would resist the Neapolitans until July 25. On April 21, 1482, the captain-at-arms of the Holy Roman Church Roberto Malatesta defeated Alfonso of Aragon at the Battle of Campomorto: after that, the Neapolitans withdrew from the Church State, and as early as August 24 the castle of Marino was recaptured by the papal army.

Given the Colonna's infidelity, Pope Sixtus IV on September 10, 1482 forfeited all their fiefs as property of the Apostolic Chamber, appointing his nephew Innocenzo della Rovere as castellan of Marino.

However, on Christmas night 1483 Sixtus IV pardoned the Colonnas by reinstating them of their fiefs, with the exception of Marino: in fact, for the cession of this fief Sixtus IV demanded from the Colonnas the cession of the Abruzzo fiefs of Albe and Celano -which were tempting the Orsini, allies of the Pope- and the sum of 14,000 ducats, so the Colonnas decisively refused. Therefore, as early as January 1484 a new war raged between the Colonnas on one side and Pope Sixtus IV allied with the Orsini on the other: on May 30 the Colonna quarter in Rome, on the slopes of the Quirinal, was set on fire and Lorenzo Colonna was taken prisoner; on June 2 Fabrizio I Colonna set out from Marino and attacked the abbey of Santa Maria di Grottaferrata, within which the papal army was encamped, and imprisoned the papal legate Rainolfo Ottieri. Fabrizio Colonna eventually declared himself willing to acquiesce to Sixtus IV's proposal in exchange for obtaining the release of his brother Lorenzo Colonna: however, the latter was beheaded after a summary trial in the courtyard of Castel Sant'Angelo in Rome on June 30, 1484. The war, therefore, continued fiercely: on July 2, the papal commanders Virginio Orsini and Girolamo Riario transited under the castle of Marino without attempting to assault it, heading for the siege of Capranica and Paliano: legend has it that the fierce resistance of the latter town caused the death of Pope Sixtus IV on August 12, 1484. The new pope Innocent VIII then signed a peace agreement with the Colonna family on January 2, 1485.

Precisely in 1485, the second act of the conflict between the Church State and the Kingdom of Naples was fought: in fact, Innocent VIII had sent back Ferrante of Aragon's ambassadors. The Orsini this time sided with the Neapolitans, while the Colonna embraced the defense of the Church: on July 11, Paolo Orsini stood for two hours in order of battle under the walls of Marino, and on July 14 -returning from a raid on Nettuno- again attempted to besiege the castle. The war ended in a deadlock on August 11, 1486.

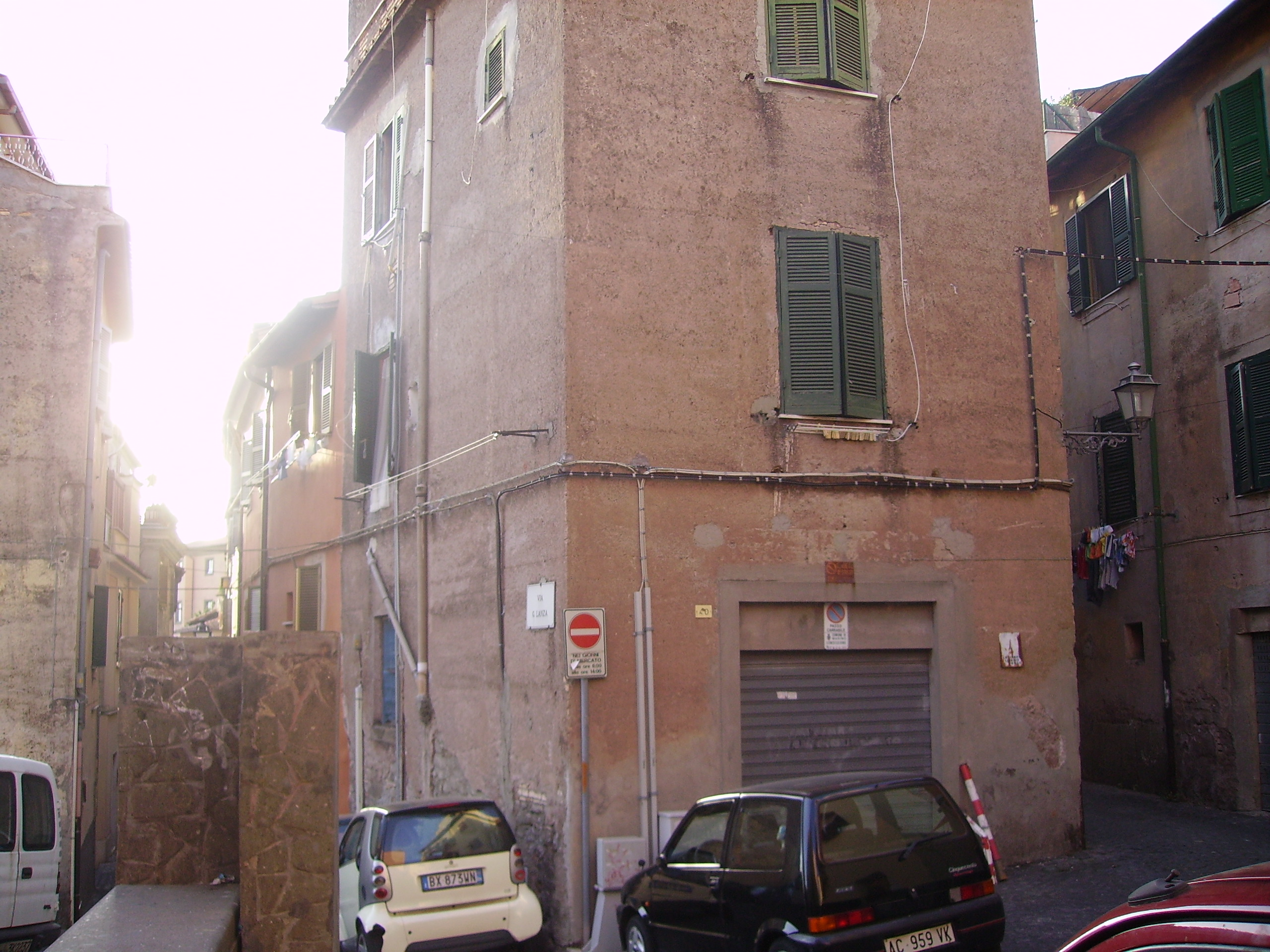
A glimpse of the Santa Lucia district.

On January 20, 1489, Agnese di Montefeltro, daughter of Federico da Montefeltro and newly wedded to Fabrizio I Colonna, entered Marino bringing a fabulous wedding trousseau in twelve chests and a dowry of 12,000 florins. In 1490 or 1492, in Marino, Agnese and Fabrizio's eldest daughter, Vittoria Colonna, was born. Agnese di Montefeltro lived permanently in the feud until her death in 1523, perhaps promoting the first reconstruction works of Palazzo Colonna and expressing her wish to be buried in the parish church of San Giovanni.

In October 1492 Pope Alexander VI ascended to the papacy, conducting an unscrupulous policy with disastrous consequences for the Church and the Papal States. On the occasion of the descent into Italy of Charles VIII of France to conquer the Kingdom of Naples, in September 1494 Fabrizio I Colonna made an alliance with the French, occupying the fortress of Ostia: the pope, of pro-Napolean tendency, wanted to come to a compromise with the Colonnas and agreed to send his son Cesare Borgia as a hostage to Marino in November 1494. On December 31, 1494, Charles VIII entered Rome, and continued his journey to Naples by transiting through Marino, the guest of Fabrizio I Colonna at Palazzo Colonna. Despite the victorious conquest of the capital, the French presence in southern Italy would be short-lived, and the Kingdom of Naples would be disputed between France and Spain for several years.

In this circumstance, the Colonna sided with Spain, this time against the pope, who had taken a pro-French side. Thus, when the new French monarch Louis XII of France sent an army commanded by Marshal of France Robert Stewart of Aubigny to Naples, Pope Alexander VI did not miss the opportunity and asked the French army to raze Marino and other Lazio fiefdoms of the Colonna family to the ground. Giuseppe Tomassetti, a great historiographer of the Ager Romanus, considers this catastrophic event the real beginning of the modern age for the castle of Marino.

=== The 16th century ===
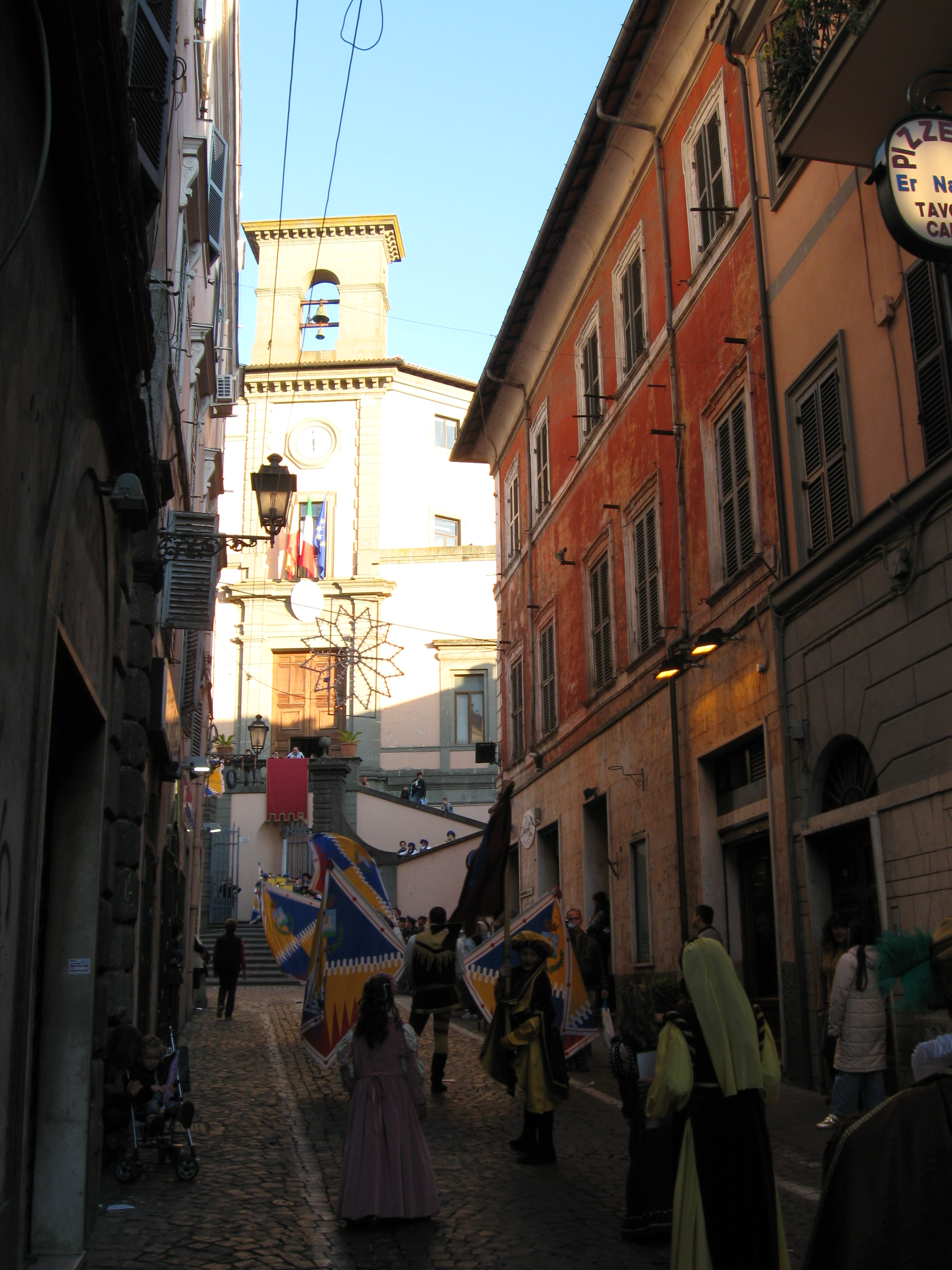
The northern facade of Palazzo Colonna as seen from Via Roma.

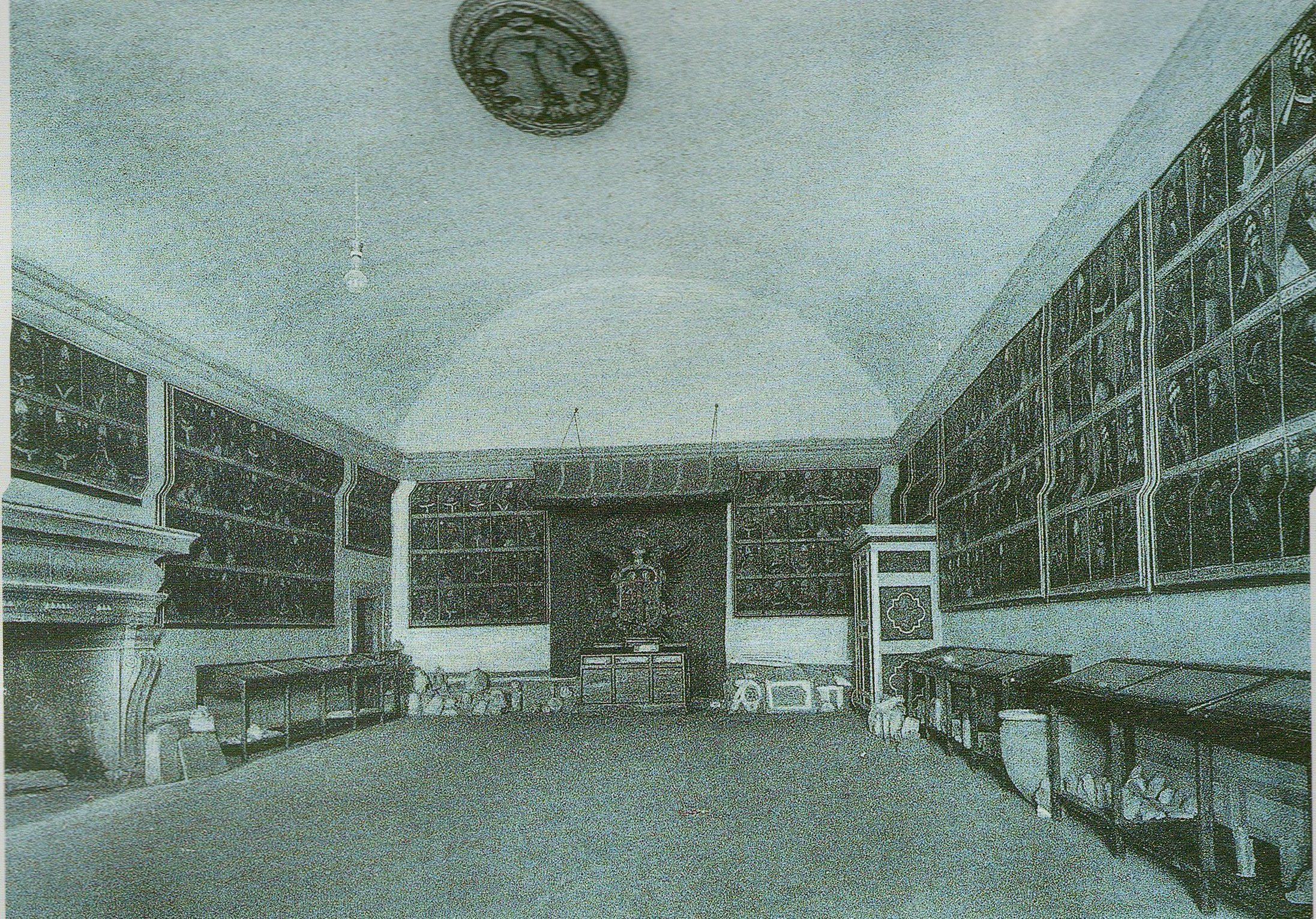
The Hall of the Popes on the main floor of Palazzo Colonna in the 1920s, before the Anglo-American bombing on February 2, 1944.

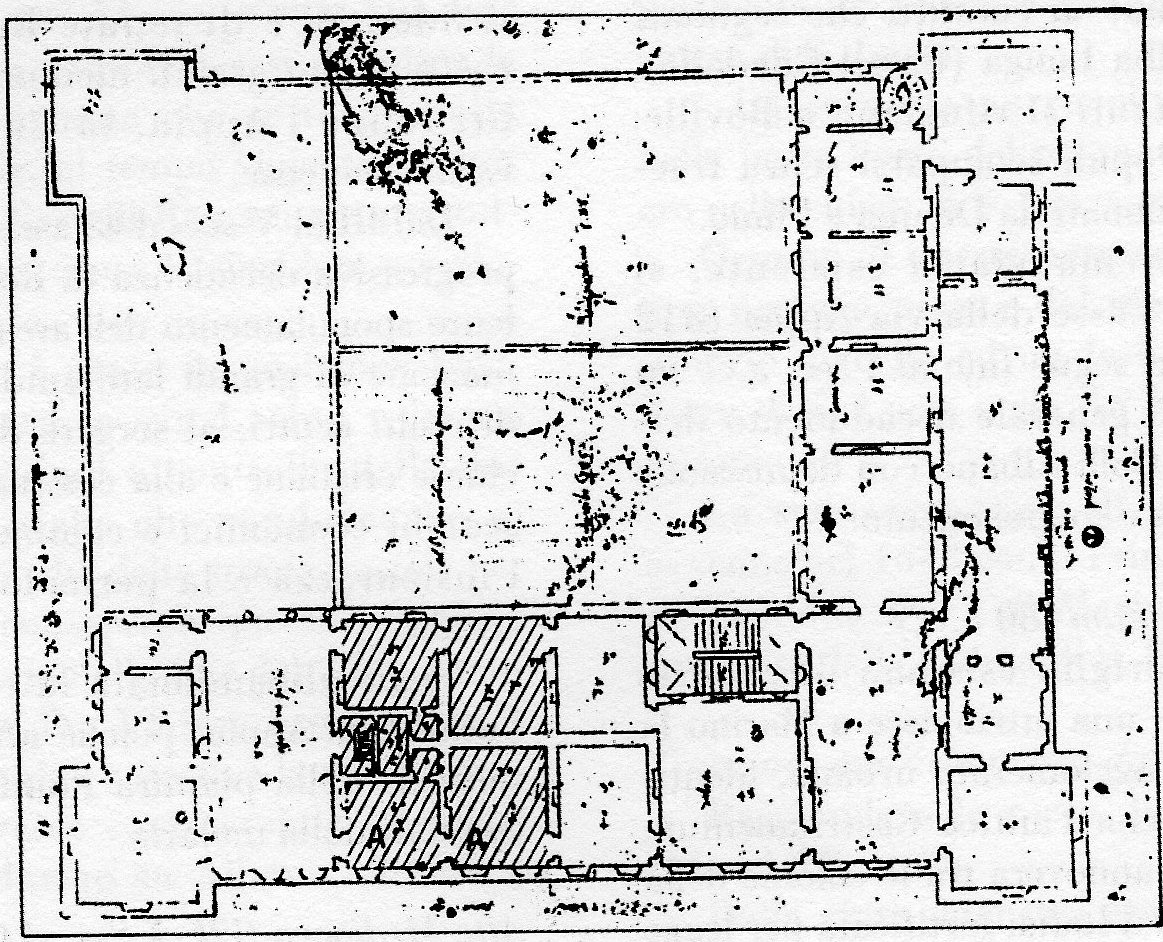
The design for Palazzo Colonna made by Antonio da Sangallo the Younger preserved in the Cabinet of Drawings and Prints of the Uffizi Gallery in Florence (dis. uff. no. 697).

After the destruction of their most important fiefs, Pope Alexander VI decreed the banishment and excommunication of the members of the Colonna family and forfeited their property to the Apostolic Chamber, although he then granted all these fiefs to his grandsons Rodrigo and Giovanni Borgia, aged two and three respectively, by Apostolic Brief "Coelestis altitudinis potentiae" of October 1, 1501. Marino, along with 36 other fiefdoms in Campagna and Marittima, found itself in the ownership of Giovanni, probably the illegitimate son of the pope's daughter Lucrezia Borgia and her lover, a certain Pedro Calderon; however, due to the latter's minor age, the care of his fiefdoms was entrusted to the cardinal archbishop of Cosenza, Francesco Borgia.

Meanwhile, the castle's salt consumption in November 1503 amounted to 40 rubbia, or about 80 quintals, which calculating an average daily consumption per person of 8 grams of salt suggests that the population of Marino was around a thousand individuals, a high figure for the time.

Upon the death of Pope Alexander VI on August 18, 1503, probably from poisoning, immediately the Colonna family reentered the Papal States, and by August 22 Prospero Colonna had regained control of the castle of Marino with the help of a squad of Spanish soldiers.

On July 19, 1512, Alfonso I d'Este, duke of Ferrara and commander of the French army in Italy, wanted by Pope Julius II but hiding from Fabrizio I Colonna, who had himself been treated with all respect in Ferrara when he fell prisoner to the French after the Battle of Ravenna (April 11, 1512), found refuge in the castle.

Later, in the war between Emperor Charles V of Habsburg and King Francis I of Valois of France, the Colonnas took the side of the imperials while Pope Clement VII sided with the French. This resulted in a papal monitorium against the Colonnas, dated November 7, 1526, which was not enough to calm the Colonna's maneuverings: so in December 1526 Clement VII ordered an army to be armed, commanded by the mercenary captain Vitellozzo Vitelli and the papal legate Agostino Trivulzio, which razed fourteen of the Colonna's Latian fiefdoms, including Marino, Zagarolo, Gallicano, Artena, Subiaco and Cave. During the destruction of Marino, the soldiers sent in force to the papal army from Velletri were particularly active: the occupants appropriated the miraculous image of the Madonna del Popolo, currently preserved in the basilica of San Barnaba, and the bells of the bell tower of the parish church of Santa Lucia. Tradition, however, has it that the Madonna del Popolo returned to Marino the day after the looting, by a miracle.

In the 1630s, Ascanio I Colonna, brother of Vittoria Colonna and husband of Charles V of Habsburg's daughter Joanna of Castile, initiated the urban renewal of the castle, in imitation of the contemporary interventions of the Farnese family in their fiefdom of Caprarola, in the province of Viterbo: thus the opening of the present-day Via Roma (then "Strada Nuova"), the main access to the castle towards Rome, was ordered, and a project for the arrangement of Palazzo Colonna entrusted to Antonio da Sangallo the Younger.

In the spring of 1539 Pope Paul III and the Colonna family fought the so-called "salt war": Paul III demanded the concession of the fiefdom of Rocca di Papa to the Apostolic Chamber as a sign of the Colonna's loyalty, but Ascanio I Colonna decisively refused and even proclaimed an amnesty of all the common criminals of his fiefdoms as long as they fought for him against the pope: nevertheless, on March 14, 1539, Pier Luigi Farnese, nephew of Paul III, occupied Marino at the command of the papal army, subsequently conquering Rocca di Papa and Paliano. The Colonna family was thus driven out of the Papal States, and thirty-five of their fiefs were forfeited by the Apostolic Chamber on May 27, 1539. Throughout all this, wars and famines drastically reduced the population of Marino compared to the beginning of the century: in fact, salt consumption as of 1539 amounted to only 20 rubbia, presumably corresponding to a population of about 500. However, upon the death of Pope Paul III in November 1549, Ascanio Colonna re-entered the Papal States and quickly conquered all his fiefdoms, arriving in Marino on November 22: the new pope Julius III would simply grant all the property and qualifications previously taken from the Colonna family.

Marcantonio II Colonna, Ascanio Colonna's eldest son, married Felice Orsini in Marino on March 1, 1552. Only two years later, in August 1554, the son usurped his father's fiefdom of Marino. Under Marcantonio Colonna's lordship, which lasted until his death in 1584, there was a strong urbanistic as well as legal and administrative renewal. After the interlude of the war between Pope Paul IV and the Colonna family (1556-1559), which ended with the expulsion of the latter from their fiefdoms and the assignment of the same fiefdoms (gathered in the so-called "State of Paliano") to the pope's nephew Giovanni Carafa, a long period of peace and development began with the return of Marcantonio Colonna to his fiefdoms in 1559.

In 1564 the seal of the Marinese community appeared for the first time, depicting a knight carrying a banner (which basically remained unchanged over the centuries); in 1566 the new "Statutes" were issued, and in 1572 the "Bandi, provisioni et ordinationi" on gambling, blasphemy and brawling: both documents were lost as a result of the Anglo-American bombings that devastated the municipal archives during World War II; also in 1566, the construction of Palazzo Colonna was one-quarter complete, including the peperino entrance staircase, and the new thoroughfare of Via Roma was fully inhabited.

On October 7, 1571, Marcantonio II Colonna was the admiral of the papal fleet at the Battle of Lepanto: as soon as he returned home on November 4, Pope Pius V ordered him to remain in Marino where his wife, mother and children were already staying until the solemn festivities awaiting him in Rome were ready: thus it was not until December 4, 1571, that Marcantonio was able to enter Rome solemnly in triumph from the Appian Way, parading through the Roman Forum and arriving at the basilica of Santa Maria in Ara Coeli.

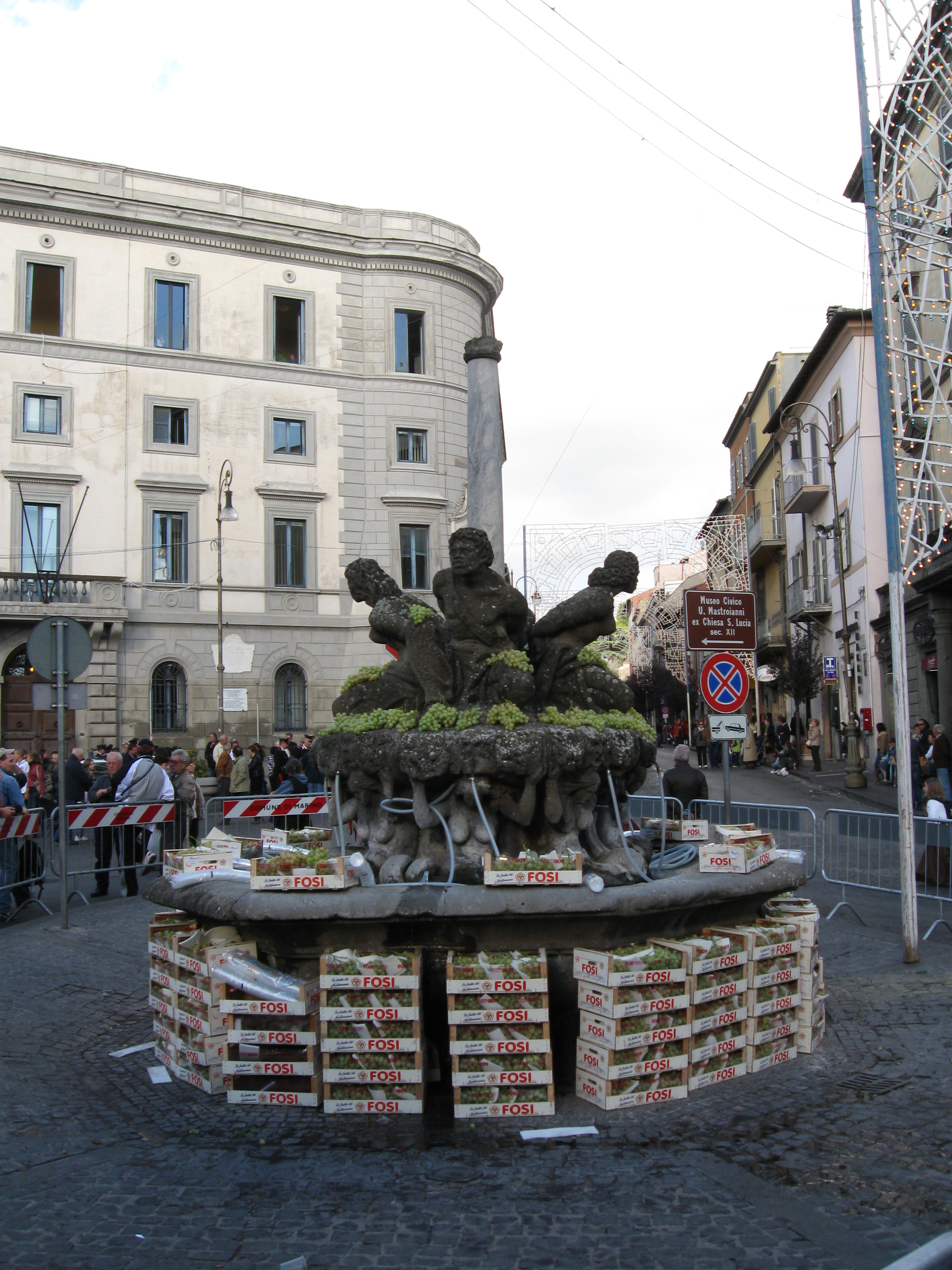
The fountain of the Four Moors, a symbol of the city, commissioned by the community in 1632 in memory of Marcantonio II Colonna's victory at the Battle of Lepanto in 1571.

In order to repopulate the fief, Marcantonio Colonna on December 26, 1574, issued a patent in which he promised exemption for four years from all royal and personal service to anyone who wished to become his vassal in the land of Marino, in exchange only for an oath of loyalty and obedience. The appeal probably did not fall on deaf ears, as the population increased considerably over the next sixty years, even exceeding a thousand inhabitants and necessitating the construction of a new, imposing and capacious parish church such as the basilica of St. Barnabas. Following a disastrous fire that had destroyed the town of Rocca di Papa in March 1577, the people of Marino housed their neighbors from Rocca di Papa while waiting for their town to be rebuilt. In the meantime from the urbanistic point of view the current Corso Trieste (called in the seventeenth century "Strada Larga") began to take shape, since Cardinal Giovanni Battista Castagna (a friend of Marcantonio Colonna, later to become Pope Urban VII) had a palace built there around 1583 with a remarkable facade enriched with peperino friezes. In April 1580 a community of Augustinian religious settled at the church of Santa Maria delle Grazie, which until then had belonged to the wealthy and ancient Confraternity of the Gonfalone of Marino.

Upon Marcantonio Colonna's death an estimate of the value of his property was made, which was not completed until 1596: out of a total of 1,200,000 pontifical scudi, the fiefs of Marino and Rocca di Papa together were worth 472,727 scudi. The successor to the victor of Lepanto was his son Cardinal Ascanio II Colonna, who did not make himself well liked by the population (who in 1599 rebelled against the cardinal, giving reason for Pope Clement VIII to send a papal commissioner ad acta): however, he was responsible for the resumption of the urban rearrangement work left unfinished by his father (who in 1577 had left for Palermo as Spanish viceroy of Sicily). During this period the walls of the inner courtyard of Palazzo Colonna were put in place, and the baronial green areas of the Barco Colonna, in the valley of the Marana delle Pietrare near the Ferentano woods, and of the Colonna Gardens, close to the northern walls, were planned, precisely on the site of the communal lands already used for the cultivation of onions for sustenance of the poorest, a fact that caused discontent among the citizens. Moreover, on October 3, 1594, the cardinal renounced the feudal right of ius super scadentiis over the lands of the vassals in exchange for a contribution of 2,000 scudi paid by the Marinese community.

=== The 17th century ===
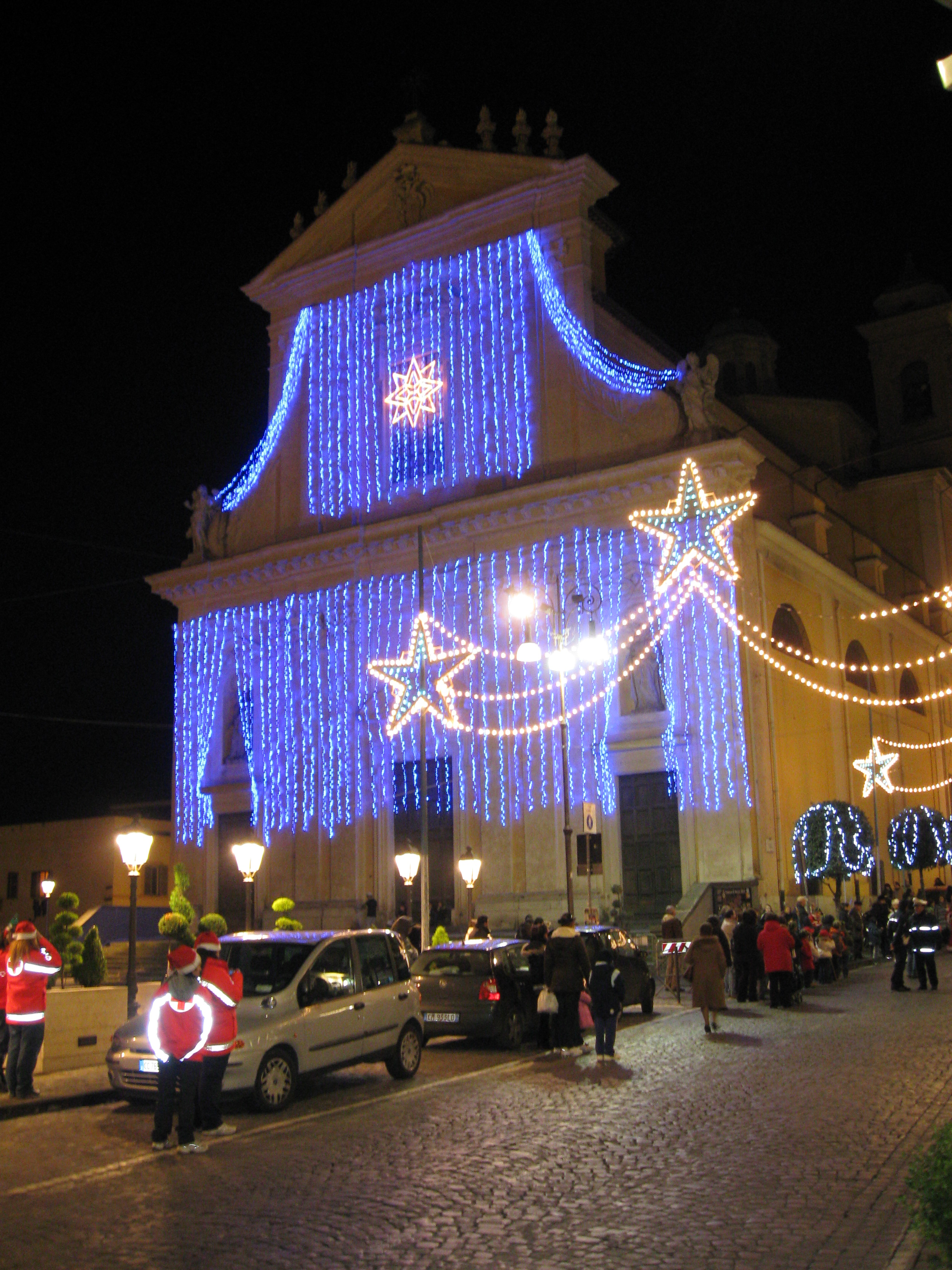
The facade of the Basilica of St. Barnabas on St. Barnabas Square during Christmas 2008.

Pope Paul V on July 1, 1606 elevated the fiefdom of Marino into a duchy in favor of Cardinal Ascanio II Colonna and his successors.

On February 1, 1618, a public assembly of the heads of the families of Marino decided to assume as patron saint of the castle Saint Barnabas, so that he would protect the Marinese countryside from the frequent hailstorms that had struck the fief in the last three years: the ecclesiastical authority in the person of the cardinal bishop of the suburbicarian diocese of Albano Francesco Sforza di Santa Fiora approved on June 4, 1619, and from then on June 11, the feast day of St. Barnabas, the patronal feast of St. Barnabas was held in Marino.

On October 24, 1627, Pope Urban VIII celebrated in the new Papal Palace at Castel Gandolfo the wedding of his nephew Tabbeo Barberini to Anna Colonna, daughter of Duke Filippo I Colonna; at the end of the service and luncheon, the bride and groom as well as distinguished guests were hosted by Duke Filippo in Marino for a dinner at Palazzo Colonna. Between 1635 and 1636 the congregation of the Clerics Regular Minor built the Church of the Holy Trinity, into which the Holy Crucifix of Marino, a miraculous crucifix that had begun dispensing graces in an outdoor chapel at the sanctuary of Santa Maria dell'Acquasanta in June 1635, was solemnly transported on June 14, 1637.

Meanwhile, the increasing population and the inadequacy of the two old parish churches of Santa Lucia and San Giovanni led Duke Filippo I Colonna and the ecclesiastical authority to desire the construction of a new parish collegiate church. Thus, on June 11, 1640, Cardinal Girolamo Colonna, son of Duke Filippo, blessed the foundation stone of the collegiate basilica of St. Barnabas. The work, which cost the Colonna family just under 24,000 pontifical scudi, was completed in 1656, but, due to the plague, the church could not be celebrated until 1662, and the official consecration did not take place until 1714. Meanwhile, Pope Urban VIII with the bull "Excelsa merita Sanctorum" of December 3, 1643 had canonically established the collegiate church by conferring on the archpriest the dignity of mitred abbot-parish priest nullius diocesios.

The plague of 1656 hit Marino and Grottaferrata hard, dramatically reducing Marino's population by more than half, so much so that the Colonna family, in order to repopulate the fiefdom, was forced to encourage immigration from their Abruzzo fiefdoms. At the end of the epidemic, the survivors developed a strong devotion to St. Roch, so much so that an oratory was built for him along the Via Maremmana Inferiore in the locality now named after the saint, whose feast day of August 16 was celebrated at least until World War II.

On September 6, 1675, the Council of Forty of the Community of Marino approved the draft of the "Constitutions of the Illustrious Community of Marino," forwarded on December 31, 1676, by the Marinese priors to Duke Lorenzo Onofrio Colonna and finally approved by him on January 24, 1677. Duke Lorenzo Onofrio and his sister Antonia also sponsored the founding of the convent of the Most Holy Rosary of the Dominican nuns of strict observance, at which their sister Maria Isabella Colonna lived, established by Pope Clement X on May 8, 1675, and whose convent church was completed in 1712 in a fine Rococo style.

=== From the 18th century to the Restoration ===
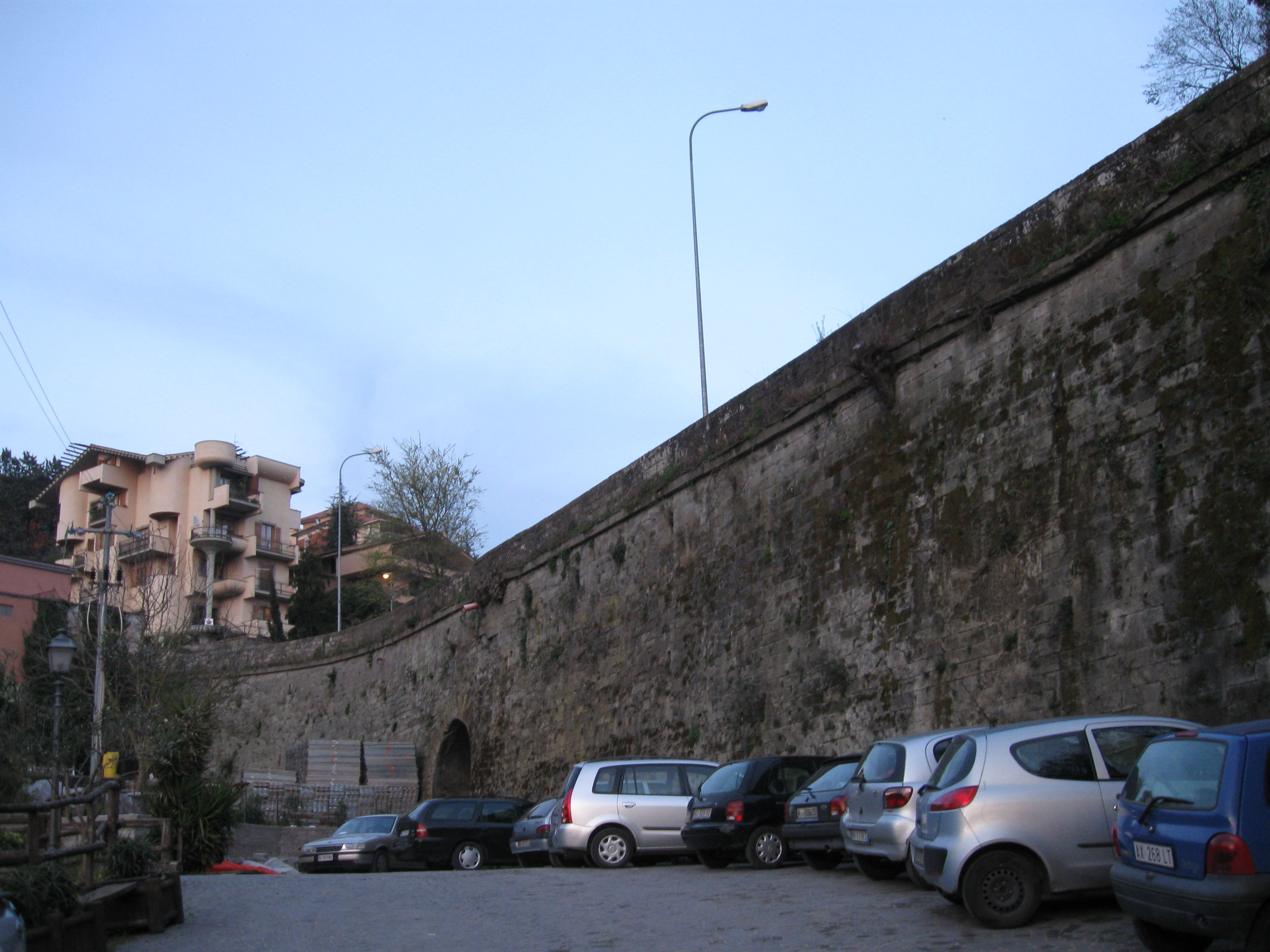
The initial section of the "Gregorian Bridge" over the Marana delle Pietrare in the Acquasanta neighborhood.

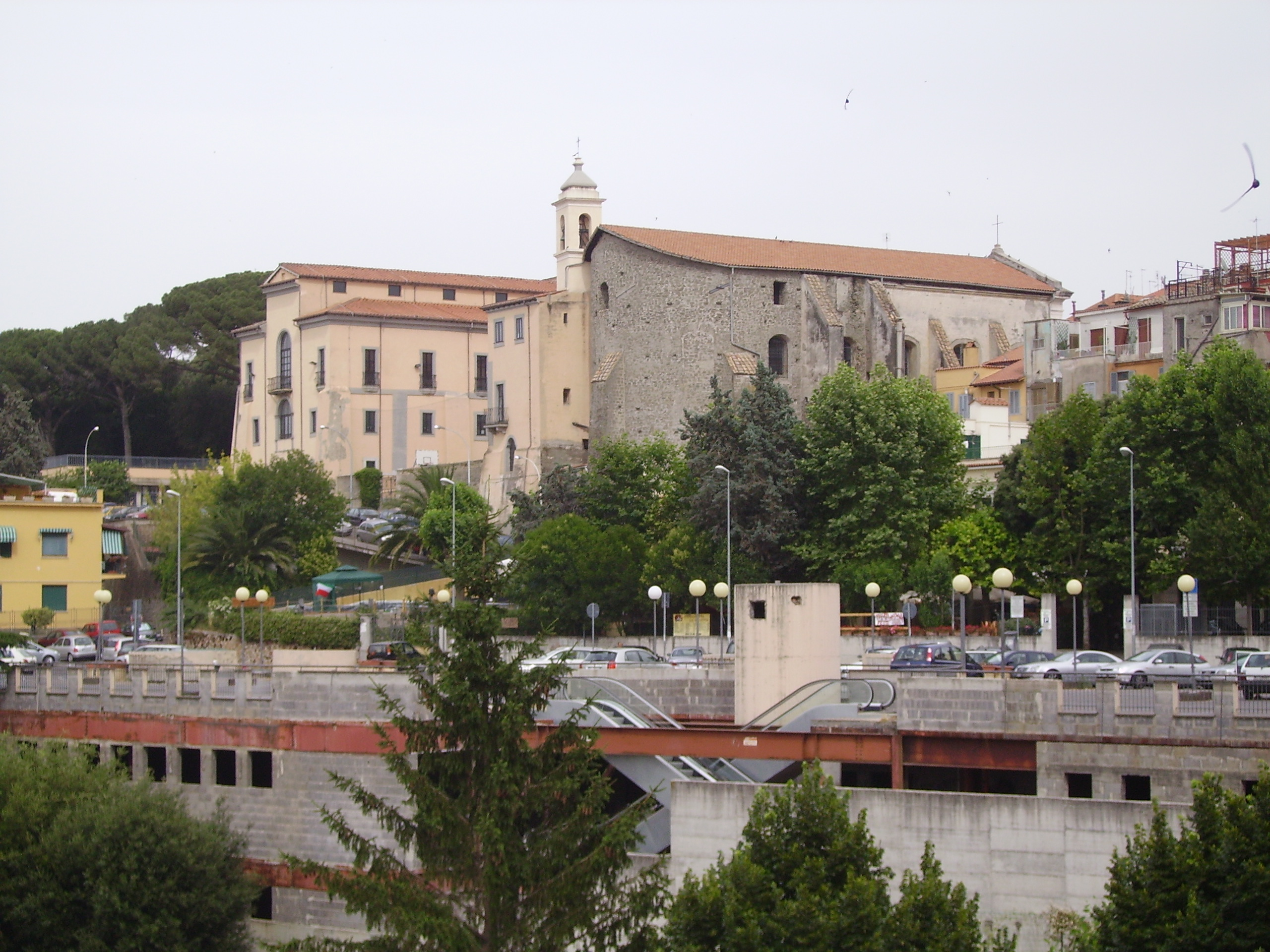
Piazzale degli Eroi, the apse of the Holy Trinity Church and the former college of the Dottrinari fathers, now the headquarters of the Paolo Mercuri State Art Institute.

The first half of the eighteenth century passed without any major events in Marino, except for the reopening of the Appian Way as a direct link between Rome, the Pontine Marshes and Naples, a work undertaken by Pope Pius VI beginning in 1777 and completed in the 1780s. This event entailed the abandonment of the old "rapid" route between Rome and Naples that had been in operation from the Middle Ages until then, and which basically followed the current state highway 217 Via dei Laghi passing through Marino, Palazzolo and Velletri, the creation of a new, faster postal route passing through Albano Laziale and Genzano di Roma, and ultimately the substitution of Albano for Marino as a major commercial center and strategic node in the area.

With the establishment of the Roman Republic (1798-1799) on February 15, 1798, almost all communities in the Roman Castles sided with the French: as early as February 18 Frascati, Albano Laziale and Velletri proclaimed themselves "sister republics" of the Roman Republic, and Marino did so in early March. However, when Trastevere rose up against the French misrule on Feb. 25, only Marino and Frascati remained loyal to the French and helped the contingent commanded by General Joachim Murat to recapture rebellious Castel Gandolfo, Albano and Velletri: the counter-revolutionaries' resistance was momentarily bent with victory at the Battle of Frattocchie on Feb. 28, 1799, and with the sacking of Castel Gandolfo and Albano. The French commander in Rome Jean Étienne Championnet complimented the Marinese republican government for its loyalty to the republican cause. However, at the moment of the French collapse and the advance of the Sanfedists in the summer of 1799, Marino was sacked by the Neapolitans.

The French returned to Rome in 1807, and Lazio was annexed to France. Marino consequently became a canton and incorporated nearby Grottaferrata, until then the property of Basilian monks governed by a commendatory abbot under a commendatory regime. At the same time, ecclesiastical property was forfeited from the state property and the religious subjected to the obligation of oath just as in the rest of French territory: however, not all the Marinese clergy were easy to bend to this imposition, since later, in 1828, Pope Leo XII awarded the canons regular of the basilica of St. Barnabas the privilege of the cappa magna in consideration of the loyalty shown to the Catholic Church in recent vicissitudes. Pope Pius VII was only able to enter Rome in 1814 after the relatively long Napoleonic interlude.

== Contemporary age ==
=== The First Restoration (1814 - 1849) ===
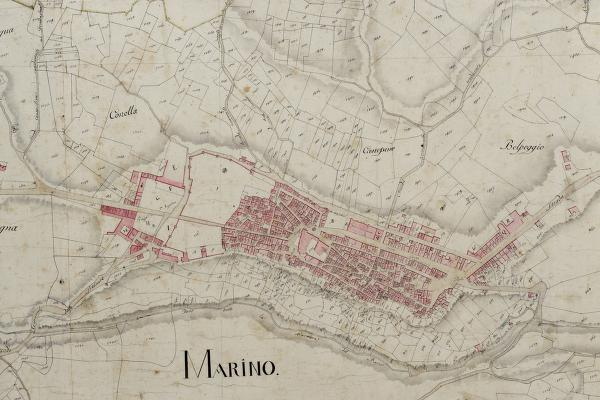
The map of Marino in the Gregorian Cadastre, the first true cadastre of the Papal States, completed in 1835 and carried out by the Congregation of the Census.

On May 24, 1814, Pope Pius VII returned to Rome after the long interlude of Napoleonic rule. Immediately, the European powers returned Rome, Lazio and Umbria to papal power: these territories were called "of first recovery." In the summer of 1815, Secretary of State Cardinal Ercole Consalvi obtained from the Congress of Vienna the restitution of Romagna, Marche and Pontecorvo, which were thus called "territories of second recovery."

On July 6, 1816, Pius VII issued the motu proprio "When for admirable disposition on the organization of the public administration." The Church State was divided into Delegations, to which "first-order" -also called "district"- and "second-order" governments were subject. In the "second-order" territories the eversion of feudalism was confirmed as per what had been established in the Napoleonic era, while in the "first-order" -including Rome and Lazio- feudalism was simply discouraged: in fact, the burden of the administration of each feud lay entirely on its feudal lord, and if the enfeoffed place was large it became unprofitable for feudal lords to maintain possession of it. Thus it was that many feudal lords renounced their centuries-old feudal rule over their fiefdoms, yet retained all property there. The "baronial places" throughout the Church State were reduced in a few years from 263 to 72.

Prince Filippo III Colonna also renounced his feudal rule over Marino, which was constituted into a municipality and probably temporarily aggregated with the "second" government of Albano Laziale. Upon Filippo Colonna's death in 1818, the inheritance was fideicommissaried to Cardinal Agostino Rivarola, while complicated inheritance issues between the prince's female daughters were resolved. The Colonna's substantial property in Marino was eventually assigned to Prince Aspreno Colonna-Doria-Del Carretto (1787-1847), who was sometimes present in local public assemblies. When he died, Prince Giovanni Andrea (1820-1894) took over ownership of the property, and began to sell off the family properties; when he died, Prince Marcantonio Colonna (1844-1912) took over, and finally the latter's two daughters Isabella (1879-1957) and Vittoria (1880-1954), who finished the work of liquidating the Colonna estate in Marino, selling Palazzo Colonna and Barco Colonna to the municipality in 1916.

The Sanctuary of Santa Maria dell'Acquasanta was decorated in 1819 with the addition of the peperino pronaos, a work designed by architect Matteo Lovatti commissioned by Canon Francesco Fumasoni.

During 1821 and 1822 Massimo d'Azeglio, in the course of his long travels through Italy, came to Marino staying at the inn located in what is now Piazza Giacomo Matteotti:

I arrived in Marino and stayed at the hotel located at the top of the town, on the crossroads of the streets that lead, one down to the church, and the others to Frascati, Castello and Albano.

— Massimo d'Azeglio, I miei ricordi, cap. XXIV p. 355.

Of the Marinese period, D'Azeglio leaves us with the beautiful description of Sr. Checco Tozzi, a singular character, his wife sora Maria and their only daughter Nina, who was married to Sr. Virginio Maldura. In addition, the Piedmontese writer also provides a lively description of the exuberance of the Marinese people:

In our towns it would make a certain impression to have a shot greeting a group of twenty or thirty individuals in this way, as a simple admonition. In Marino, on the other hand, it seemed logical and most natural. But it must be known that the mood of the Marinese does not resemble ours at all, nor that of many other populations. [...] And by this I do not mean to conclude that Marino is a sad and corrupt population. Far from it. The family, marriage, parenthood, are very much respected there: for all that it is regularity of life, privacy of women, I have never seen the slightest disorder. [...] Of thefts I never heard of any. I always found admirable readiness in everyone, to help each other and to please those who, of course, treated with kindness, and did not want to quarrel with them.

— Massimo d'Azeglio, I miei ricordi, cap. XXIV p. 369.

Archaeologist Giuseppe Tambroni, with the help of Cavalier Vincenzo Colonna, started some archaeological excavations in 1823 at the hamlets of Frattocchie and Due Santi, and identified the remains of the monumental area of the ancient city of Bovillae: the most sensational find was that of the circus, one of the largest in Rome. The excavations went on with excellent results until 1825.

In an 1824 document preserved in the State Archives of Rome, the municipal coat of arms of the time appears: as in previous depictions, a human figure holding a flag on a galloping horse appears. Surrounding the figure is the inscription "Comunitas Mareni."

On August 12, 1828, Pope Leo XII granted, by Apostolic Brief, the use of the cappa magna to the canons regular of the Basilica of St. Barnabas, with the following reasons:

Ob eorum in adversis retroactorum temporum vicissitudinibus erga ipsum et Sedem Apostolicam probatam fidelitatem ac devotionem.
Due to their proven faithfulness and devotion in the adversity of recent times toward myself and the Apostolic See.

—Pope Leo XII, Apostolic Brief August 12 1828.

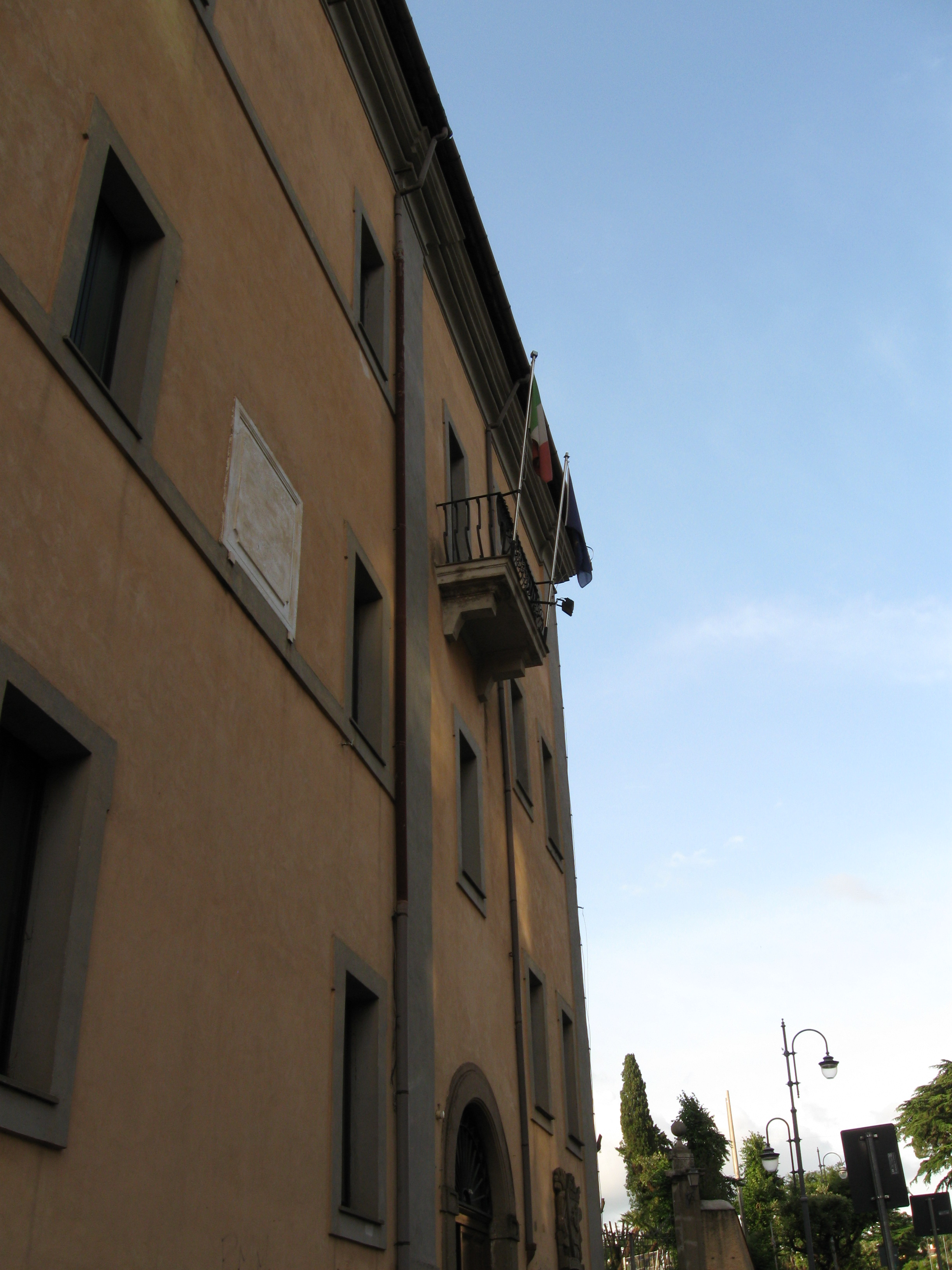
The building of the Paolo Mercuri State Institute of Art, formerly home to the college of the Doctrinaire Fathers.

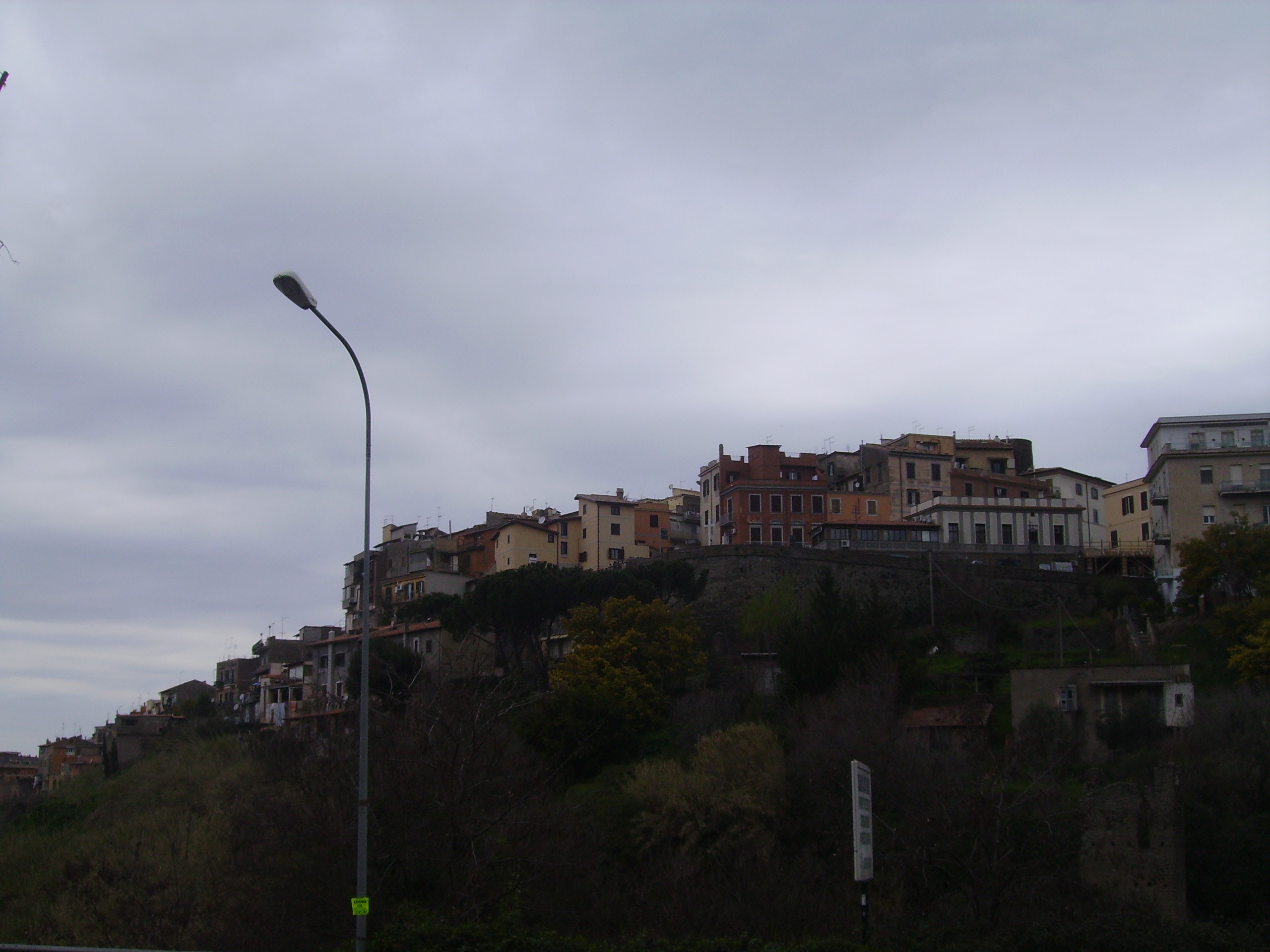
The final part of the "Gregorian Bridge" as seen from the Domenico Fiore Municipal Stadium.

During the pontificate of Pope Gregory XVI, Marino was abundantly benefited by the pontiff, who very often during his summer and autumn vacations in Castel Gandolfo went to the city to visit Cardinal Mario Mattei, protector of the city, who resided at the 17th-century Villa Colonna di Belpoggio. Gregory XVI's first visit to Marino made as pope -he had been there before, both as a cardinal and as a simple monk- occurred on Oct. 8, 1831; the last on Oct. 3, 1844, two years before the pontiff's death, which the people of Marino mourned heartily.

In 1831 it was Pope Gregory XVI who again elevated Marino to the seat of government, at the request of the municipality itself in the person of the then acting prior Cesareo Paiella. The most important measure taken by Gregory XVI in favor of Marino is undoubtedly the elevation to the rank of City which occurred through the Apostolic Brief in more institutoque Romanorum Pontificum given in Rome on July 3, 1835: all the privileges connected with the title of City are granted, subject to obedience to the suburbicarian see of Albano. Along with the title of City, a college of the Fathers of the Christian Doctrine for the secondary education of youth was founded in Marino, with its seat at the Church of the Holy Trinity: this college, supported by the Municipality, remained active until December 1870. On November 17, 1843 through Apostolic Brief Gregory XVI granted the canons and the abbot-parish priest of the basilica of St. Barnabas the use of the purple silk collar.

In the 1830s, at the behest of Pope Gregory XVI, the Congregation of Good Government built a new access road to the city coming from Castel Gandolfo, replacing the old route that was steeply sloping. The new road, after passing the Marana delle Pietrare with a low viaduct, ascended toward the present Piazza Giacomo Matteotti with a large embankment, thus softening the steep slope of the terrain: it was called by the people of Marino "Ponte Gregoriano" -'u Ponte in Marinese dialect- in memory of the reigning Pope.

On July 14, 1837 at a meeting of the town council a decision was made to prohibit the transit, by means of a chain stretched in the middle of the road, of wagons coming from Rocca di Papa along the present-day via di Capo d'Acqua, between the localities of San Rocco and Capo Croce. This resolution was made following the observation that the road had been much ruined by the continuous transit of heavy wagons coming mostly from neighboring Rocca di Papa.

Between 1837 and 1838 a cholera epidemic developed in the Roman area. The City Council of August 12, 1838 made urgent decisions regarding a possible development of the epidemic in Marino, as suggested by the Supreme Tribunal of Health: 500 scudi were allocated to set up a sanitary hospital, "the requisition of linen beds not being allowed, and pecuniary subsidies from pious places and wealthy families to provide for the current expenses;" in addition, it was considered to call a second doctor to the city in case the epidemic developed; and finally, it was determined appropriate to locate a place to bury any dead as a result of the epidemic. At the end of the epidemic, since cholera had not claimed any victims in the city, the people of Marino dedicated the narrow escape to Our Lady of the People, a miraculous image kept at the basilica of St. Barnabas: at a city council meeting on October 3, 1838, it was decreed that a silver lamp be donated, which the Confraternity of the Most Holy Rosary was to light in front of the sacred image.

In the fall of 1841 a whirlwind ravaged some areas of the municipal territory: the City Council in its session of November 15, 1841 voted a grant to restore the roof of the convent of Santa Maria ad Nives of Palazzolo, in the sum of 20 scudi. In the same council session, urgent work was also decreed on the roof of the College of the Doctrine Fathers adjacent to the Church of the Holy Trinity, at a cost of 19.64 scudi.

In 1842 architect Giacomo Aloisi designed and built a new government residence with prisons, probably located in front of Palazzo Colonna overlooking the present Piazza della Repubblica. Cardinal Antonio Pallotta later had the Church of St. Anthony of Padua built in front of the prison building for the greater convenience of the inmates.

== The Second Restoration (1849 - 1870) ==
In 1850 several pagan sepulchral inscriptions were found in the Soldini vineyard in the locality of Santissimi Apostoli, located in a place likely granted by the decurions of Castrimoenium for burial.

On Sept. 25, 1852, Prince Giovanni Andrea Colonna granted Giovan Battista Guidi to carry out some archaeological research on land owned by the Colonna family located in Casa Rossa, near the hamlet of Due Santi: leftovers of a villa, a marble male statue and other finds emerged.

In 1853, with Pope Pius IX reigning, a group of historians, archaeologists and scholars composed of Ennio Quirino Visconti, Antonio Canova, Carlo Fea, Antonio Nibby, Luigi Canina and Giovanni Battista De Rossi took care of the archaeological arrangement according to modern criteria of the entire route of the Old Appian Way from Porta San Sebastiano to Frattocchie, for a length of almost eleven miles. In the same year Domenico Zoffoli, inside his own vineyard in the locality of Mura dei francesi, today the city center of Ciampino, found a pagan peperino altar belonging to a sacellum of the imperial age and a pagan tombstone; in 1861, in the same vineyard again Domenico Zoffoli found some ruins traceable to a medieval church with a floor formed by pagan and Christian sepulchral inscriptions traceable to the family of Valerii Messallae.

== The Unification of Italy ==
=== The end of the 19th century (1870 - 1900) ===
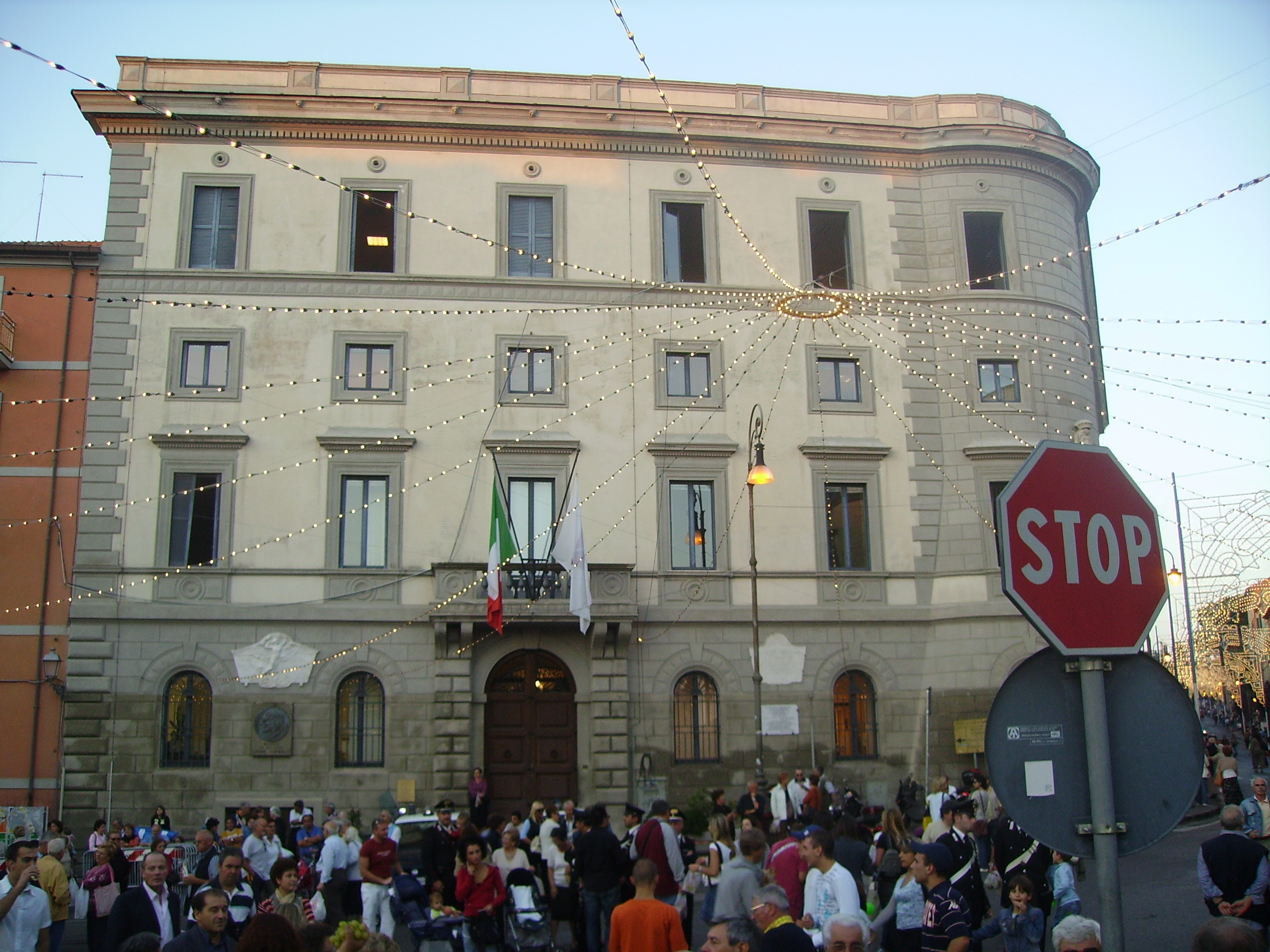
Matteotti Palace, municipal seat from 1878 to 1918 and from 1946 to 1964.

In September 1870, a column of bersaglieri from Frosinone passed through Marino on their way to Rome for the taking of Porta Pia (September 20, 1870): they were festively welcomed by the population. On December 23, 1870, Marino's first town council was held in the Kingdom of Italy. As the Republican trend was in the majority, it was decided to close the College of the Fathers of the Christian Doctrine and the school of the Religious Teachers Venerini, and to abolish the annual offering of candles that the community made to the Palazzolo Convent. The Council deliberated in favor of abolishing the five o'clock mass in the morning, since because of the night time, it created incidents between men and women, and the latter and the priests themselves.

Although for years there had been talk of a project for a Roman Castles railway line, in 1880 the municipality of Marino decided to force its hand and build a direct rail link between the old town and the then hamlet of Ciampino, which was already connected to Rome, Frascati and Velletri thanks to the Rome-Frascati railway (inaugurated in 1856) and the Rome-Velletri railway (inaugurated in 1863). The line, inaugurated in 1881, was actually a steam tramway rather than a railway proper, connecting the present Roma Tiburtina station with the Borgo Garibaldi district, following a fairly inadequate route that faced a problematic gradient. Consequently, new work began immediately to build the present Rome-Albano railway, a direct link that in addition to Marino would also reach Albano Laziale and, in the now abandoned section, Cecchina and Nettuno: work on this section, the most scenic in the Roman Castles, lasted from 1884 to 1889. The new Marino Laziale railway station was built in what is now the Cave di Peperino district, separated from the built-up area by a steep drop bridged by the long "station steps" but at the time close to the important peperino quarries. During construction work on the Rome-Albano railway in 1880 in the locality of Marcandreola, now on the border with the municipality of Ciampino, ruins of a suburban villa from the Roman period were identified and excavated by archaeologist Luigi Boccanera in 1884. Thus emerged a large quadrangular factory of the vastness of 103.40x70.50 meters, clearly belonging to a suburban villa of the Republican age that belonged to Quintus Voconius Pollonius, whose name appears in some aquarian fistulae found in the excavations. Numerous artistic materials found at the villa were later taken to Rome: among all, the Apollo Pythios preserved in the courtyard of Palazzo Valentini, seat of the province of Rome, is noteworthy.

In 1894 the city fire brigade was established.

The Municipality of Marino in 1896 decided to have a public fountain built for the watering of beasts along what is now Provincial Road 73/a Via Castrimeniense, also known as Via Romana for being the main road artery connecting Rome and Marino: thus arose the Fontanile Comunale, as evidenced by a short inscription affixed to it:

S.P.Q.M.
ANNO
MDCCCXCVI
S.P.Q.M.
Year
1896

—Inscription affixed to the center of the Municipal Fountain on Cesare Colizza Street.

== The 20th century ==
=== The first decades of the twentieth century (1900 - 1922) ===
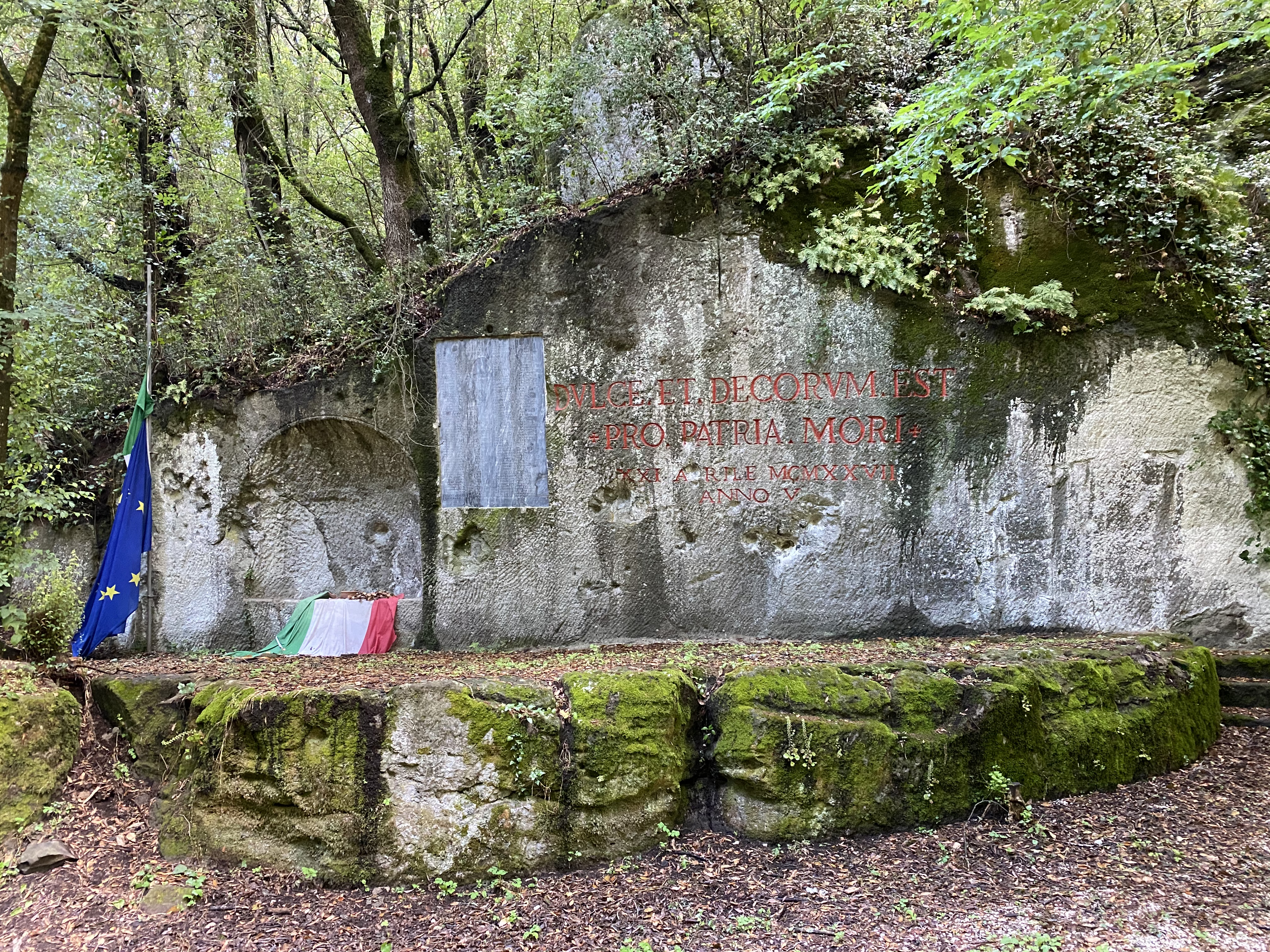
The World War I war memorial in Barco Colonna, designated as a Remembrance Park after World War I (June 2020).

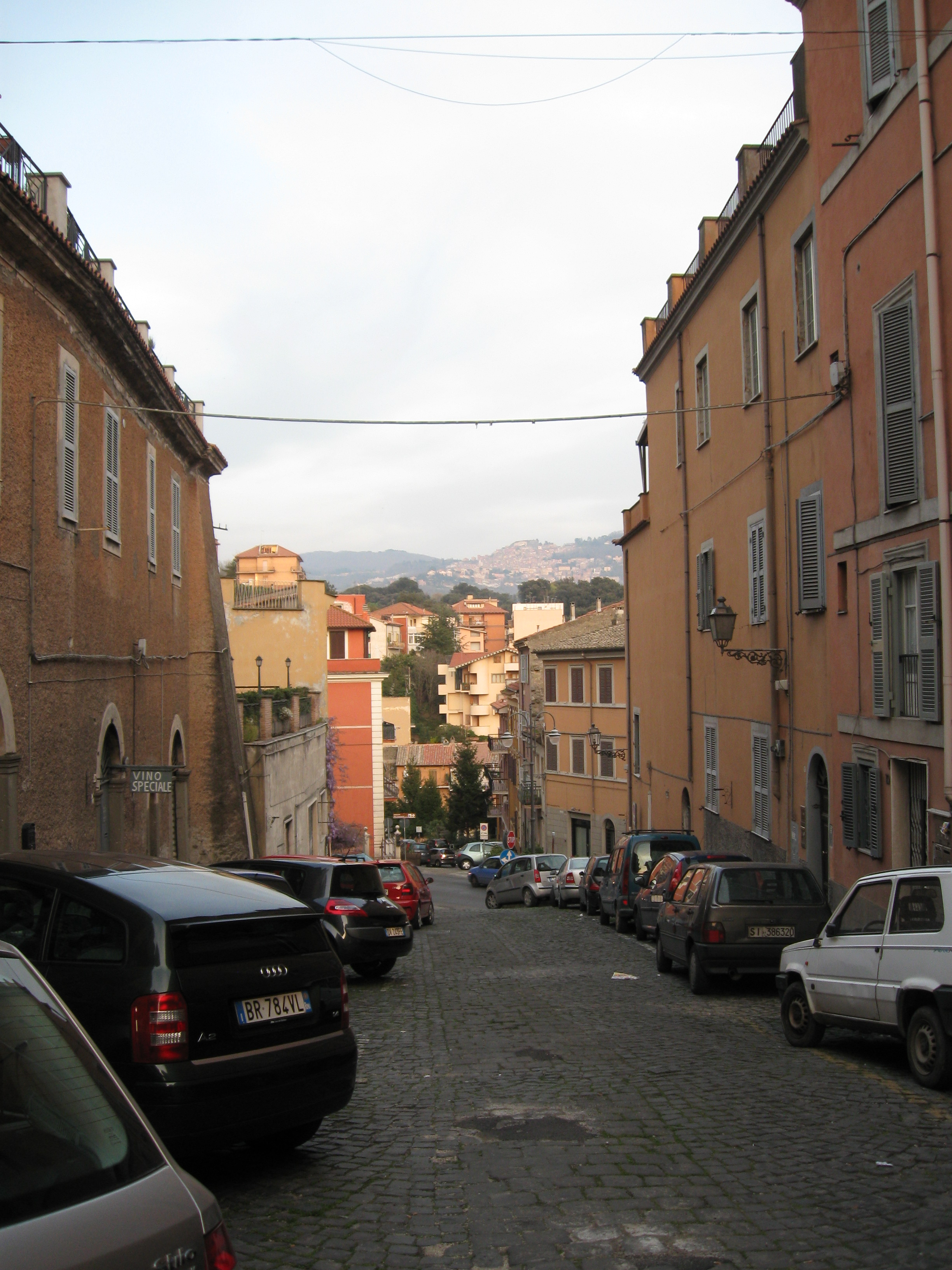
Via Cesare Battisti: in the background, Rocca di Papa.

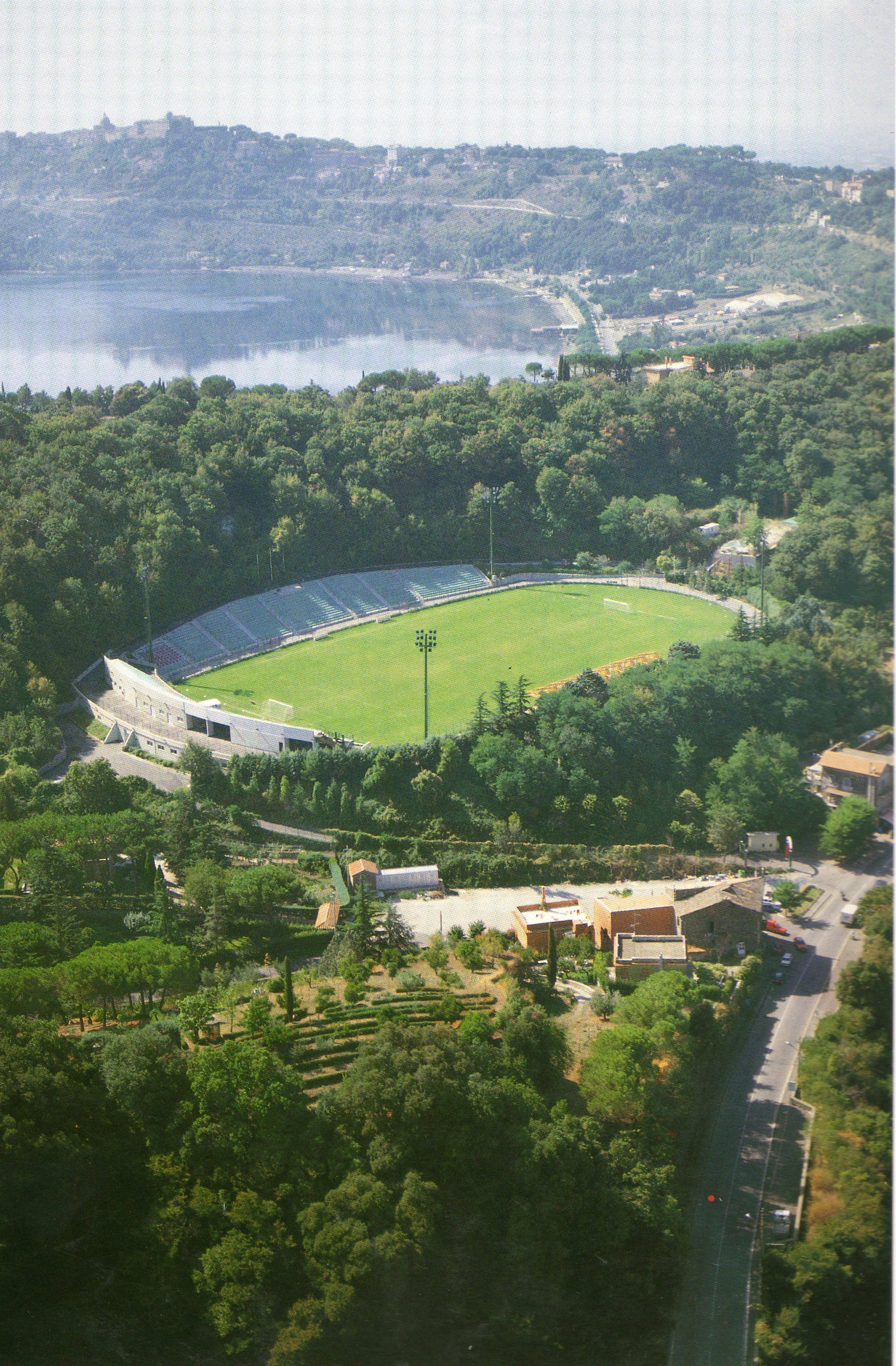
Domenico Fiore Municipal Stadium in the 1990s.

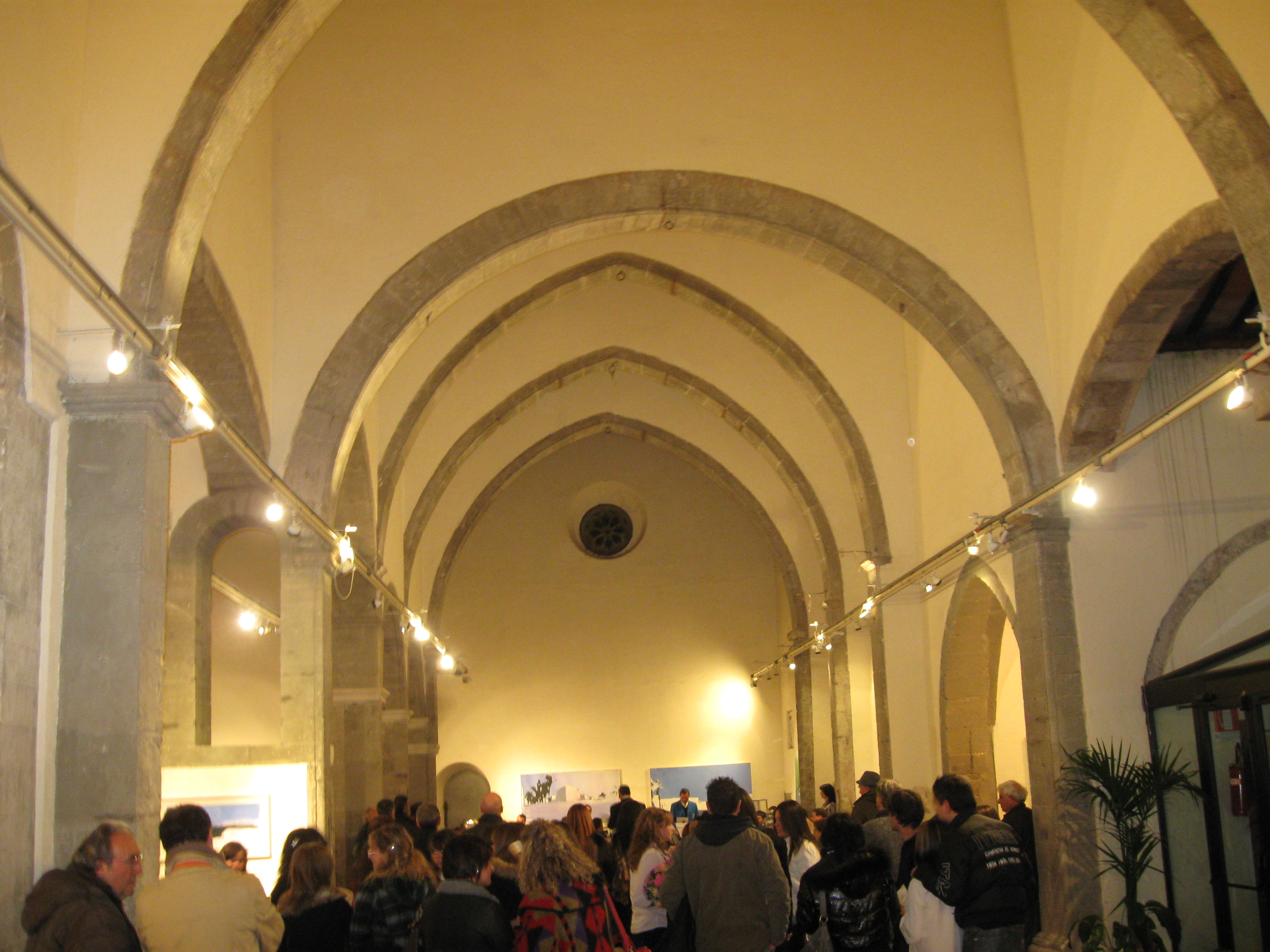
The Umberto Mastroianni Civic Museum.

In the early decades of the twentieth century, a series of studies began to analyze the finds identified in the necropolises found in the Marinese territory near the crater of Lake Albano: the necropolis of Pascolari di Castel Gandolfo, that of Monte Crescenzo and Campofattore, the finds of Prato della Corte and Capo Croce -on the border with Rocca di Papa-, and that of the locality of San Rocco and Riserva Del Truglio, the latter being the most substantial. The artifacts found in the analysis of these necropolises were largely sent to the Pigorini National Museum of Prehistory and Ethnography in Rome, while a smaller part remained at the collections kept by the municipality. Following the numerous archaeological finds occurred to in the last decades of the nineteenth century, in 1915 the municipality took care to set up at the premises of Palazzo Colonna a municipal antiquarium. In the meantime, in 1919/1920 Marquis Achille Fumasoni Biondi opened a "royal vocational school," made public in 1921/1922 and updated over the decades to become, in the 1960s, the present "Paolo Mercuri" state institute of art.

In 1909 the abbot-parish priest of the basilica of St. Barnabas Monsignor Guglielmo Grassi sponsored the founding of the San Barnaba Cooperative Credit Bank, a banking institution aimed at assisting farmers and small artisan entrepreneurs. Monsignor Grassi, assisted by the future Servant of God Zaccaria Negroni, founded the San Barnaba Parish Oratory, a kindergarten during World War I, the theater and two local religious orders. During this period, and then until the advent of fascism (1922), clashes occurred between anti-clerical Catholics and Republicans.

As early as 1904 the Feste Castromenie, a Roman Ottobrata event related to the celebration of local grapes and wine, had been celebrated in Marino in October, and since the late sixteenth century the feast of Our Lady of the Rosary had been celebrated on October 7 -anniversary of the Christian victory at the Battle of Lepanto in 1571-, however, the Roman poet of Marinese origin Leone Ciprelli thought of combining these two events, one profane and the other sacred: thus was born in 1925 the Marino Grape Festival, the first event of its kind in Italy. The first edition of the festival was held on Sunday, October 4, 1925, and since then the first Sunday in October has been the fixed date for the celebrations of the festival. The main feature of the event is the so-called "miracle of the fountains that give wine," but the program varies from year to year becoming richer or more depleted in attractions. In the early decades the festival, sponsored by the Opera Nazionale Dopolavoro and the fascist regime, was a great success: in 1931 an influx of about 50,000 people was calculated, in 1940 more than 2,000 liters of wine were distributed from the fountains.

=== World War II (1943 - 1944) ===
On July 19, 1943, the day after the bombing of Rome, 525 U.S. planes hit several suburban areas of Rome, the Rome-Urbe airport and the Rome-Ciampino airport, then located in the municipality of Marino: eighteen civilians from Marino were killed. A second air raid on Ciampino caused some civilian casualties on August 17, 1943.

On the afternoon of Sept. 8, 1943, a few hours before Marshal Pietro Badoglio announced the signing of the Cassibile armistice, U.S. planes hit the Squarciarelli road junction in the municipality of Grottaferrata, cutting tramway communications between Frascati and Marino and damaging the aqueduct lifting facilities that also partly supplied Marino.

On the night of January 22-23, 1944 at 02:45 a.m. massive Anglo-American forces landed at Anzio, creating a bridgehead at the gates of Rome: from this date the bombing of the Roman Castles intensified considerably.

On January 30, 1944, following a partisan action in which a German officer had been seriously wounded, Ferdinando Lanciotti was stopped in Marino; he was found in possession of a firearm and was shot on the spot. On February 1, 1944 Ariccia and Albano Laziale were bombed: the Appian Way was impassable.

On Wednesday, February 2, 1944 at about 12:30 p.m. some North American B-25 Mitchell bombers of the 15th United States Army Air Forces, with a tonnage of 1360 kilograms of bombs each, bombed Marino, hitting the historic center diagonally: this is how Zaccaria Negroni, at the time local head of the National Liberation Committee, describes perhaps the most tragic moment in his war memoirs, Marino under the bombs:

Wednesday, Feb. 2. All is quiet, serene. People are heading home for lunch. In the church, the solemn Candlemas service has just ended. Some women linger quietly in the stores for their daily shopping.

Half past twelve: roar of engines. Alarm. But few make their way to the shelters; most stand by, as usual: so many formations have passed, especially in the last few days! Where will they go to sow death?.... There, one formation has passed. A second one is heard coming; it too will pass like the others. A sudden roar abruptly breaks all illusions. (It was the collapse of Palazzo Colonna, hit by large chain bombs). People rush to the shelters. Too late! A shower of bombs comes over, heralded by ragged hisses. Then another and another. The village is buried in smoke and the dust of rubble: it cannot be seen a meter away. Screams. Groans. Wailing. Rubble.

I give up describing. Those who have lived through those moments know; those who have not lived through them ... cannot understand.

— Zaccaria Negroni, Marino sotto le bombe, pp. 15-16.

Palazzo Colonna, where a German radio stage had been installed -and allegedly Field Marshal Albert Kesselring had made use of it himself- was completely destroyed; the Fountain of the Four Moors, engulfed by the rubble of the eastern facade of Palazzo Colonna, and the Villa Colonna di Belpoggio, the site of a car park, were also completely destroyed. In what is now Piazza Giacomo Matteotti, the collapse of housing uncovered one of the towers of the 13th-century Frangipane Fortress. The only truly sensitive military target in Marino's territory, namely the crossroads between Via Maremmana Inferiore and Via dei Laghi, was spared from Anglo-American bombing.

On February 17, 1944, the convent of the Little Sisters of the Poor, at which the Germans had set up a weapons and ammunition depot, was hit by U.S. bombing: nineteen nuns died. On May 23, 1944, a U.S. carpet bombing hit some cottages located in the present-day Villa Desideri neighborhood and devastated part of the Municipal Cemetery. Other air raids carried out on Marino in the last days of May hit Via Roma -May 27, seven civilian casualties-, again the Municipal Cemetery -May 28-, the Castelletto district -May 30, numerous civilian casualties-, the basilica of San Barnaba -May 31-. Eleven dead and numerous wounded were the toll of a U.S. air raid in the Borgo Garibaldi district on June 1, 1944. During the war period, the civilian population sought refuge at the cellar caves, where they considered themselves sheltered from air raids, and in the tunnels of the decommissioned Rome-Albano railway, especially in the Marino tunnel.

With the approach of the front line to Marino, the prefect of Rome delivered to the prefectural commissioner the order to evacuate the city: he in turn put all decisions back into the hands of Zaccaria Negroni, who in order to avoid the deportation of the inhabitants to some refugee camp and the looting of abandoned houses -as happened, for example, in nearby Lanuvio- refused to enforce the evacuation order.

During the night between June 3 and 4, 1944, it becomes clear that the German front, attested along the Hitler Line between Lanuvio, Velletri and Valmontone was inexorably collapsing: the German withdrawal intensifies, as does the Allied cannonade. The Germans organized a weak resistance at the entrance to Marino, in the locality of San Rocco: when the first Allied soldiers from Grottaferrata arrived, minor clashes would occur, leaving some dead on the ground. Having completely occupied Marino, the Allies appointed Zaccaria Negroni as mayor pro tempore and left for Rome, which was liberated on the night of June 4-5.

== The post-World War II period ==
=== The years of reconstruction (1944 - 1960) ===
After the liberation of Rome, Mayor pro tempore Zaccaria Negroni and the city council were faced with a bleak landscape: ten percent of the houses were destroyed or severely damaged, every rail link and tramway in the Roman Castles was disabled due to the bombing, many roads were blocked by bomb debris. Immediately after the destruction of Palazzo Colonna, until then the municipal headquarters, some municipal offices moved to the premises of the Oratory of the Coroncina, in the basement of the Basilica of St. Barnabas.

=== The years of economic boom (1960 - 1990) ===
In 1966 the renovated Ferentum Municipal Stadium was inaugurated by Mayor Giulio Santarelli and the Honorable Achille Corona, Minister of Tourism and Entertainment, in the presence of Abbot Pastor Giovanni Lovrovich and with the extraordinary participation of Sophia Loren, owner together with her husband Carlo Ponti of a historic villa located at the foot of Marino's historic center along State Road 217 Via dei Laghi.

On August 6, 1970, the Parliament passed a motion declaring Marino wine a DOC (Denominazione di origine controllata) product. The production of this wine is prerogative of the territories of Marino, Ciampino, Castel Gandolfo, Grottaferrata and Rome.

On September 25, 1974, after two years of preparation, Regional Law No. 69 granted the hamlet of Ciampino, whose exponential urban growth had begun in the 1930s thanks to the railroad and airport, to secede from the municipality of Marino. Independence became effective on December 18, 1974.

In 1979 a new General Regulatory Plan was launched for the municipality of Marino, which provided for the planned urbanization of Santa Maria delle Mole and Frattocchie, as well as the expansion of the historic center.

In 1988 the Lazio Region established the Appia Antica Regional Park, covering a total of 3600 hectares of green space between the municipalities of Rome, Ciampino and Marino.

=== The last decade of the 20th century (1990 - 2000) ===
During the 1990 FIFA World Cup, the Italian national soccer team was hosted in Marino for a training camp. For the occasion, the Municipal Stadium, which hosted the Azzurri's training sessions, was restored. Also under the circumstance of the World Cup, 'u Giardinacciu, now Piazza Giuseppe Garibaldi, was refurbished.

After the closure of Marino's peperino quarries, interest in this material did not wane, on the contrary: between 1978 and 1990, the City of Marino organized the Biennial of Stone, with the participation of artists such as Marino's Paolo Marazzi, Spain's Luis Ramos, and Japan's Kazuto Kuetani. On October 5, 1991, the City Council approved the historical bond for part of the abandoned quarries, around which the Cave di Peperino district developed.

On January 12, 1992, a referendum was held among the residents of the hamlets of Santa Maria delle Mole, Cava dei Selci, and Frattocchie, current wards II and III of the municipality of Marino, to obtain autonomy for their territory, under the name of the Autonomous Municipality of Boville: 85.5% of the voters were in favor of separation. In 1994, the Autonomous Municipality of Boville was established, but soon afterwards it was suppressed and reincorporated into Marino: the newly formed municipality of Marino was commissioned until new elections. The Autonomous Municipality of Boville was established by Regional Law No. 56 of October 21, 1993: at the time of its creation it was 16.89 km2 wide -against the total 26.10 km2 of the municipality of Marino with hamlets- and had a population of 18,818 inhabitants -against the 32,903 inhabitants of the municipality of Marino with hamlets-. The suppression of the municipality was sanctioned by Constitutional Court ruling No. 433 of September 6, 1995. The Constitutional Court, in a subsequent ruling (No. 43/03) regarding the autonomy of the hamlet of Baranzate from the municipality of Bollate, in the province of Milan, elevated the case of the autonomy of Boville almost as an example, asserting:

There would be a difference between the case of the detachment of Boville from Marino (the case that gave rise to the question resolved in Judgment No. 433 of 1995) and the case of the erection as an autonomous municipality of Baranzate by detachment from Bollate. In fact, it would be one thing to erect as an autonomous municipality a fraction (not small but not huge either) of a municipality that remains larger in any case, as in the case now before the Court, and quite another thing to erect as an autonomous municipality a very large part of the territory of a pre-existing municipality, as occurred in the case of Marino. In that case, it would have been absurd not to consult the entire population of Marino, precisely because Marino, after the Boville split, would have become something other than what it was.

— Judgment of the Constitutional Court No. 43 of February 10 2003.

== The 2000s ==
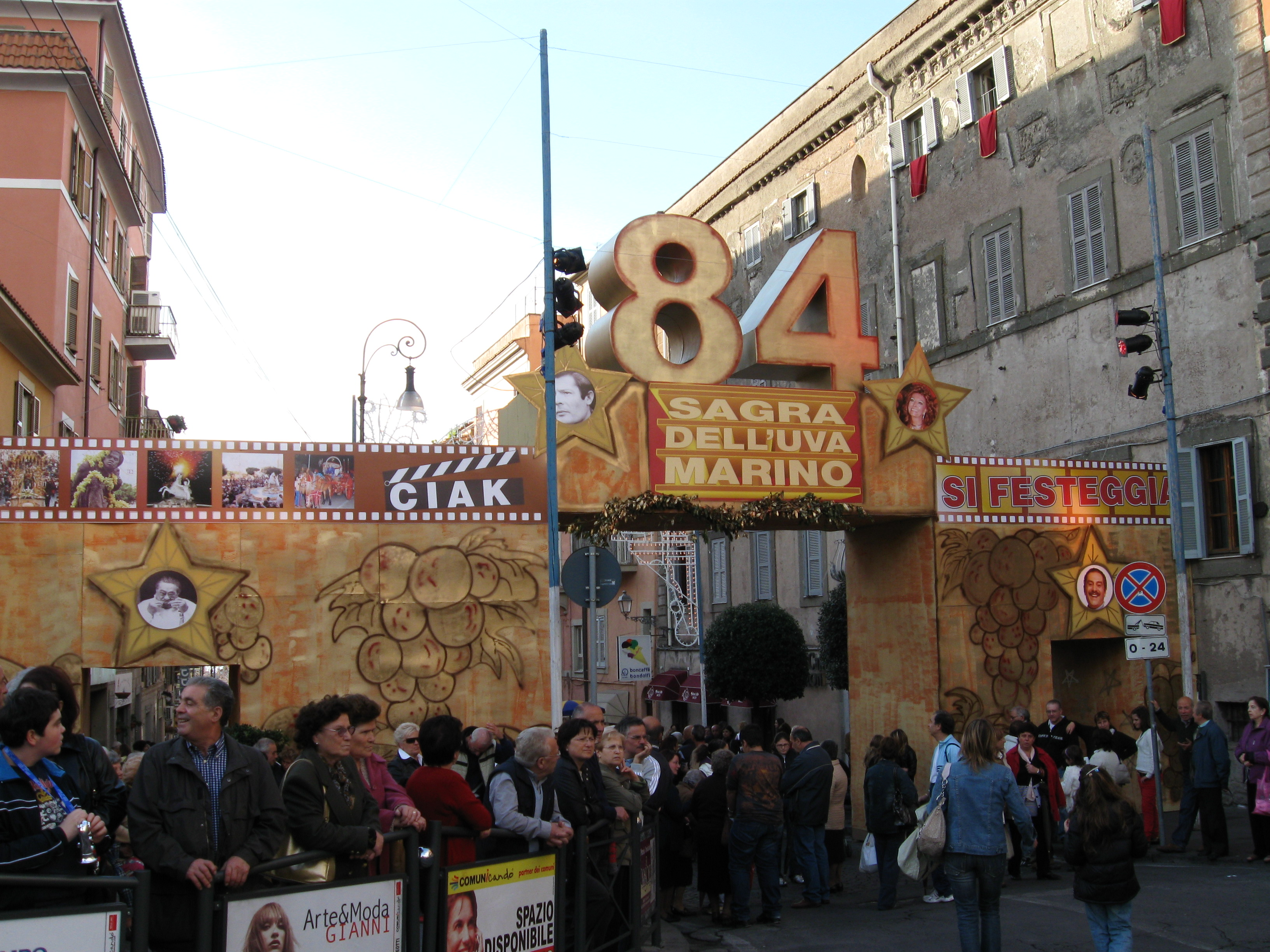
The plasterboard triumphal arch made on Corso Trieste for the 2008 Grape Festival.

On Sunday, October 3, 2004, during the celebrations of the 80th edition of the Sagra dell'Uva (Grape Festival), a new twinning between Marino and the Greek city of Lepanto -today called Nafpaktos- was signed.

On Saturday, April 12, 2008, two small earthquake tremors were felt with epicenter between Marino, Ciampino and Frascati and hypocenter about ten kilometers underground: the first tremor, felt at 07:45 a.m., was magnitude 3.8, while the second tremor at 07:58 a.m. was magnitude 2.2. The first to report the earthquake to the Civil Defense were the Marino Traffic Wardens, who throughout the morning carried out stability checks on schools and public buildings.

Following the ordinance against prostitution signed by the mayor of Rome Gianni Alemanno on September 14, 2008, the mayors of the municipalities in the Roman district noticed an increasing displacement of prostitutes to their own municipalities: notably, this was noticed in Frascati by Mayor Francesco Posa and in Marino by Mayor Adriano Palozzi. The mayor of Marino thus thought of issuing an ordinance against prostitution in the Marino territory, on October 2, 2008:

[...] it is forbidden for anyone, on the public street and on all areas subject to public passage in the territory of the city of Marino [...] to stop and/or stand for the purpose of contracting or otherwise entertain with persons engaged in prostitution or to agree on or request sexual services for payment or for a fee. [...] It is also prohibited to adopt attitudes, behaviors, or wear clothing that unequivocally manifests the purpose of solicitation or exercise of the activity of prostitution. [...] Violation of this ordinance shall be subject to the administrative penalty of payment of 50 euros.

— Municipal Ordinance of the City of Marino October 1, 2008.

However, the President of the Province of Rome Nicola Zingaretti, in a summit with the mayors of the municipalities in the Roman district held on October 6, 2008, expressed his opinion on the futility of multiplying similar anti-prostitution initiatives outside the municipality of Rome.

On December 9, 2008, Vladimir Luxuria went to the Umberto Mastroianni Civic Museum to visit the exhibition set up there in memory of Luciano Massimo Consoli, the late president of the homosexual culture club of Rome. During the visit, the former congresswoman visited the convent of cloistered Dominican nuns.

On Dec. 10, 2008, a delegation of Sierra Leonean authorities consisting of the Bishop of Makeni Monsignor Giorgio Biguzzi, the Mayor of Makeni Alhaji Andrew Kanu, and the President of the Northern Province as well as Minister of Internal Affairs of the current government was received at Palazzo Colonna. The meeting, which was attended by the newly installed abbot pastor of the Basilica of St. Barnabas Monsignor Pietro Massari, who is in charge of the mission of the Suburbicarian Diocese of Albano in the territory of the Diocese of Makeni, was followed on Dec. 11 by a mass in the basilica.

== See also ==
- Marino
- Ariccia
- Rocca di Papa
- Sanctuary of Santa Maria dell'Acquasanta
- Sanctuary of Santa Maria della Rotonda

== Bibliography ==
- Ricci, Giovanni Antonio (1787). Memorie storiche dell'antichissima città di Alba Longa e dell'Albano moderno. Rome: Stamperia Giovanni Zempel.
- Lucidi, Emanuele (1796). Memorie storiche dell'antichissimo municipio ora terra dell'Ariccia, e delle sue colonie di Genzano e Nemi. Rome: Tipografia Lazzarini.
- Ratti, Nicola (1797). Storia di Genzano, con note e documenti. Rome: Stamperia Salomoni.
- Moroni, Gaetano (1840). Dizionario di erudizione storico-ecclesiastica. Venice: Tipografia Emiliani.
- Nibby, Antonio (1848). Analisi storico-topografico-antiquaria della carta de' dintorni di Roma. Rome: Tipografia delle Belle Arti.
- Gregorovius, Ferdinand (1973). Storia della città di Roma nel Medioevo. Turin: Einaudi.
- Torquati, Girolamo (1974). Studi storico-archeologici sulla città e sul territorio di Marino. Marino: Tipografica Renzo Palozzi.
- Tomassetti, Giuseppe; Tomassetti, Francesco (1910). La Campagna Romana antica, medioevale e moderna IV. Turin: Loescher.
- Chiarucci, Pino (1986). "Gli insediamenti laziali e quelli albani in particolare". In Pino Chiarucci (ed.). Il Lazio antico dalla protostoria all'età medio-repubblicana, Atti del corso di archeologia tenutosi presso il Museo Civico di Albano nel 1982-1983. Roma: Paleani Editrice.
- Del Nero, Raimondo (1990). La Valle Latina. Frascati: Parco regionale dei Castelli Romani.
- Rufo, Vittorio (1991). Marino - Immagini di una città. Marino: Banca di Roma.
- Antonelli, Vincenzo (1993). La chiesa della Madonna dell'Acquasanta in Marino. Veroli: Tipolitografia dell'Abbazia di Casamari.
- Del Nero, Raimondo (1994). Bovillae. Marino: Tipografia Gianni Palozzi.
- Devoti, Luigi (1999). Cryptaferrata - Grottaferrata. Velletri: Edizioni tra 8 & 9.
- Bedetti, Alessandro (2000). Dall'antiquarium al museo civico. Marino: Comune di Marino.
- Del Nero, Raimondo (2002). La diocesi tuscolana dalla origini al XIII secolo. Frascati: Associazioni "Amici del Tuscolo".
- Devoti, Luigi (2002). Palazzo Matteotti a Marino. Marino: Banca di Roma.
- Devoti, Luigi (2003). Frescati - Frascata - Frascati. Velletri: Edizioni tra 8 & 9.
- Fezzi, Luca (2008). Il tribuno Clodio. Rome-Bari: Laterza.
