= Mohini Sharma =

Indian educationist, social entrepreneur

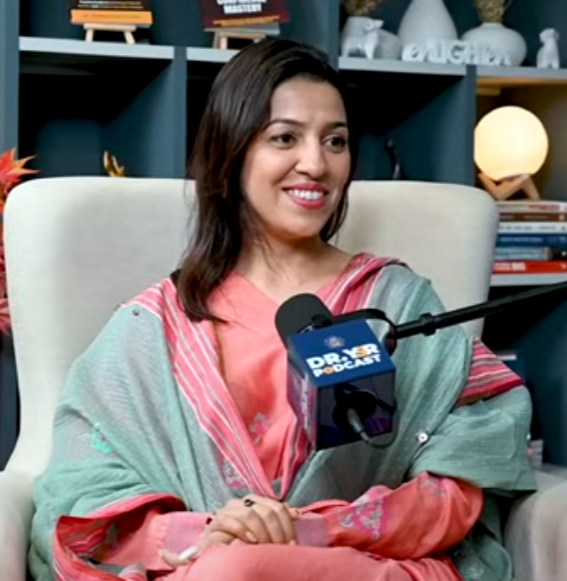
- In a 2024 interview
- Born: Mumbai, India
- Education: Middlesex University London
- Occupations: Social entrepreneur, and beauty pageant director
- Years active: 2016–present
- Organization: Mrs. India Inc
- Notable work: Mrs. World (2016)
- Title: Mrs. India World (2016)
- Website: mohinisharma.in

Mohini Satyendra Sharma is an Indian educationist, social entrepreneur, and beauty pageant director, known as the founder and national director of Mrs. India Inc., a national beauty pageant for married women. She represented India at Mrs. World 2016 pageant.

Sharma is also a TEDx speaker and trustee of the Udaan Trust, advocating for women's rights and environmental causes.

== Early life and education ==
Mohini Satyendra Sharma was born to Satyendra Sharma in Mumbai, India. She holds a Bachelor's degree in banking and insurance, and an MBA in business strategy and social welfare from Middlesex University London, United Kingdom.

Prior to her pageantry career, she managed secondary schools and preschools in Mumbai and its outskirts for nine years, establishing her foundation as an educationist.

== Career ==
Sharma began her career in the beauty pageant industry after winning the Mrs. India World 2016 title, representing India at the Mrs. World pageant held in Korea.

Inspired by her experience, she founded Mrs. India Inc. in 2016 to create a platform for married women to showcase their beauty, intelligence, and talents while challenging societal stereotypes. The pageant is affiliated with international competitions such as Mrs. World, Mrs. Globe, and Mrs. Galaxy, Mrs. International Summit, and Mrs. International World, and has produced notable winners like Sargam Koushal (Mrs. World 2022).

Under Sharma's leadership, Mrs. India Inc. has expanded to include initiatives like Indian Femme, aimed at further women’s empowerment. In 2021, she became the first Indian to serve on the judging panel for the Mrs. Sri Lanka World pageant.

As a social entrepreneur, Sharma serves as president of the Inner Wheel Club and is involved with NGOs focusing on health, sanitation, cancer care for children, and education for underprivileged girls.

In 2025, she collaborated with Greenpeace India and Greenpeace South Asia at the Cannes Film Festival to advocate for climate justice, partnering with Juhi Vyas.

Sharma is also a TEDx speaker and has been featured in publications for her entrepreneurial journey.

== Awards and recognition ==
- Mrs. India World 2016
- First Indian judge for Mrs. Sri Lanka World 2020
