= Heroes of the Environment (2007) =

Topic of Time Magazine special issue

Heroes of the Environment is a list published in Time magazine. The inaugural list was published in October 2007. The 2007 list contains 43 entries, individuals or groups that have contributed substantially to the preservation of environment, and is divided into four categories: Leaders & Visionaries, Activists, Scientists & Innovators, and Moguls & Entrepreneurs.

The list has been commented on and discussed worldwide in newspapers and by organizations.

== Leaders & Visionaries ==
- Mikhail Gorbachev
- David Attenborough
- Lee Myung Bak
- Al Gore
- Janine Benyus
- Tommy Remengesau
- José Goldemberg
- Prince Charles
- James Lovelock
- Robert Redford
- David Suzuki
- Barnabas Suebu
- Angela Merkel

== Activists ==
- Frederic Hauge
- Wang Canfa
- Olga Tsepilova
- Von Hernandez
- Wangari Maathai
- Christine Loh
- Benjamin Kahn
- Karl Ammann
- Hammer Simwinga

== Scientists & Innovators ==
- Toyota Prius Design Team
- Tim Flannery
- Theo Colborn
- Chip Giller
- James E. Hansen
- D.P. Dobhal
- Norman Myers
- Paul Crutzen
- Abul Hussam
- George Schaller

== Moguls & Entrepreneurs ==
- Tulsi Tanti
- Kazutoshi Sakurai and Takeshi Kobayashi
- Jeffrey Immelt
- Amory B. Lovins
- Ray Anderson
- Richard Sandor
- William McDonough and Michael Braungart
- Shi Zhengrong
- Ahmet Lokurlu
- Richard Branson
- Kristine Pearson and Rory Stear of Lifeline Energy

== See also ==
- Environmental Media Awards
- Global 500 Roll of Honour
- Global Environmental Citizen Award
- Goldman Environmental Prize
- Grantham Prize for Excellence in Reporting on the Environment
- Tyler Prize for Environmental Achievement
- Nuclear-Free Future Award
