= Yeb Saño =

Filipino former chief climate negotiator, climate justice advocate

Naderev "Yeb" Madla Saño (born 1974) is a Filipino environmentalist, climate diplomat, and climate justice activist. He gained international prominence as the chief negotiator for the Philippines in the United Nations Framework Convention on Climate Change (UNFCCC), where his emotional pleas and advocacy for a "loss and damage" mechanism during UN climate summits captured global attention. In 2013, he was named one of the "Ten People Who Mattered in Science" by the journal Nature for his high-profile efforts to demand global action on climate change.

== Early Career and Government Service ==
Before entering government service, Saño spent many years as a community organizer in the Philippines' countryside, working with climate vulnerable communities. He worked extensively on disaster risk reduction and climate adaptation projects. He later joined the Philippine government, serving as a pioneer Commissioner for the Climate Change Commission and the country's chief climate negotiator.

== UNFCCC Climate Negotiations ==
Saño's tenure as a climate negotiator was marked by his passionate advocacy for vulnerable nations experiencing the immediate impacts of extreme weather events. He was responsible for negotiating on the issues on climate finance, mitigation, loss and damage, and just transition.

== COP18 (Doha) ==
At the 2012 UN Climate Change Conference (COP18) in Doha, Qatar, Saño first drew international media attention. As Typhoon Bopha (locally known as Pablo) wreaked havoc on the southern Philippines, an emotional Saño addressed the plenary in tears, pleading with delegates to take meaningful action to halt global warming and prevent future disasters.

== COP19 (Warsaw) and the 14-Day Fast ==
One year later, immediately before the 2013 COP19 summit in Warsaw, Poland, the Philippines was struck by Super Typhoon Haiyan (Yolanda), one of the most powerful tropical cyclones ever recorded. Saño delivered a landmark speech to the UN plenary that moved many delegates to tears. He challenged climate change deniers and declared, "It is time to stop this madness. Right here in Warsaw". In solidarity with the victims of the typhoon, Saño announced a voluntary hunger strike, fasting for 14 days until "meaningful outcomes" were reached, particularly regarding climate finance and the institutionalization of the loss and damage mechanism. His protest catalyzed the "Fast for the Climate" movement, leading global civil society members to fast in solidarity with the Philippines and demand political sanity amidst global inaction.

== Exclusion from Lima COP20 and Glasgow COP26 Absence ==
Despite his global profile, Saño's outspoken stance made him a polarizing figure in diplomatic circles. In December 2014, he was controversially dropped from the Philippine delegation for the COP20 talks in Lima, Peru. Years later, he was notably absent from the COP26 summit in Glasgow in 2021, citing the deep inequities of the COVID-19 pandemic and vaccine distribution that physically excluded many Global South activists from participating.

== Activism and The People's Pilgrimage ==
In April 2015, Saño officially resigned from his position as a climate negotiator to transition fully into civil society advocacy. He became known for leading long-distance "climate walks" to raise awareness. In 2014, together with other climate advocates, he completed a 1,000-kilometer walk from Kilometer Zero in Manila to "Ground Zero" in Tacloban to commemorate the anniversary of Typhoon Haiyan. In 2015, he spearheaded The People's Pilgrimage, a massive 1,500-kilometer trek from Rome to Paris ahead of the signing of the Paris Agreement at COP21. In 2018, he led the Climate Pilgrimage covering six countries from Rome, Italy to Katowice, Poland.

== Leadership Roles ==
Saño has held several prominent leadership positions in the international environmental sector: Greenpeace Southeast Asia - He was appointed Executive Director, where he led regional campaigns focusing on climate justice, plastic pollution, and holding fossil fuel companies accountable. Laudato Si' Movement - Saño serves as a founding member and Chair of the Board of the global Catholic movement for ecological justice. On October 1, 2025, he notably served as a keynote speaker and opened the "Raising Hope on Climate Change" Conference in Castel Gandolfo, an event headlined by Pope Leo XIV. Human Rights and Climate Justice - Saño's advocacy has been heavily cited in human rights circles, including submissions to the Commission on Human Rights of the Philippines' landmark National Inquiry on Climate Change (NICC).

== In Media and Academia ==
Saño's climate diplomacy and activism have been the subject of academic analysis regarding the emotional dimensions of climate diplomacy. He has written forewords for environmental literature [13], and his advocacy has been featured in various documentary films and video features.
