= Mrs. South Africa =

National beauty pageant in South Africa

- Formation: 2002; 24 years ago
- Headquarters: Johannesburg
- Location: South Africa
- Members: Mrs. World; Mrs. Globe
- Board of directors: Joani Jacobs (CEO since 2011)
- Parent organization: Mrs South Africa Pty Ltd
- Website: mrssouthafrica.co.za

Mrs. South Africa is a national beauty pageant for married women in South Africa that selects the country's representatives to compete in Mrs. World and Mrs. Globe.

Carika Bebb is Mrs. South Africa 2026.

== Titleholders ==
Year	Mrs. South Africa	Runners-Up		Ref
Year	Mrs. South Africa	1st Princess	2nd Princess	Ref
2026	Carika Bebb (Note: Verushka Singh was originally crowned Mrs. South Africa 2026, but she stepped down after five months, after which the first princess, Carika Bebb, assumed the title.)		Talitha Oosthuizen	
2025	Erin Jane Miller	Tshiamo Githinji	Lisa Gittins	
2024	Tshego Gaelae	Noeline Rajbally (Note: Pearl Nikolic was named first princess in 2024, but she stepped down six days after her coronation.)	Theresa Maluluke	
2023	Palesa Matjekane	Hlengiwe Sabela	Léchar Knezovich	
2022	Jo Judnick-Wilson	Roxy van Bruwaene	Michelle Forsyth	
2021	Thenjiwe Mdluli	Sumaiya Omar	Zikhona Ngata	
2020	Jacqueline Ferns	Sandra Harmse	Olwethu Nodada	
2019	Matapa Maila	Enolicia Streve	Jo-Ann Barnwell	
2018	Nicole Capper	Gela Le Roux	Mankoana Nhlebela	
2017	Hlengiwe Twala	Olwethu Leshabane	Lilliana Lulli-Marruchi	
2016	Candice Abrahams	Aldytha da Silva	Marlene Naiker	
2015	Sarah Kate Seaward	Riana Mooi	Mirell Ventura	
2014	Chane De Kock	Chantelle Swart	Kholofelo Chademanah	
2013	Fikile Mekgoe	Gugu Chama	Driekie van Wyk	
2011/12	Lynne De Jager			
2010	Laurette Batstone			
2009	Joani Johnson			
2006	Annette Kasselman			
2002	Marelize Steyn-Earle			

=== Placement at Mrs. World ===
Color key

- Declared as Winner
- Ended as Runner-up
- Ended as Top Finalists or Semi-Finalists

Year	Mrs. World South Africa	Placement at Mrs. World	Special Awards	Ref
2025	Erin Jane Miller	Top 18		
2024	Tshego Gaelae	Mrs. World 2025		
2023	Palesa Matjekane	Top 17		
2022	Jo Judnick-Wilson			
2021	Thenjiwe Mdluli			
2020	Jacqueline Ferns	Top 5		
2019	Matapa Maila	1st Runner-up		
2018	Nicole Capper	Top 5		
2017	Hlengiwe Twala			
2016	Candice Abrahams	Mrs. World 2016		
2015	Sarah Kate Seaward	1st Runner-up		

=== Placement at Mrs. Globe ===
Color key

- Declared as Winner
- Ended as Runner-up
- Ended as Top Finalists or Semi-Finalists

Year	Mrs. Globe South Africa	Placement at Mrs. World	Special Awards	Ref
2026	Carika Bebb	Top 16		
2025	Tshiamo Githinji	Top 5	Beautiful Brilliance award	
2024	Noeline Rajbally	Top 20	The Motivator of the Year; Mountain Top Award	
2015	Riana Mooi	Mrs. Globe 2015		
