= Mrs. India Inc =

Indian beauty pageant for married women

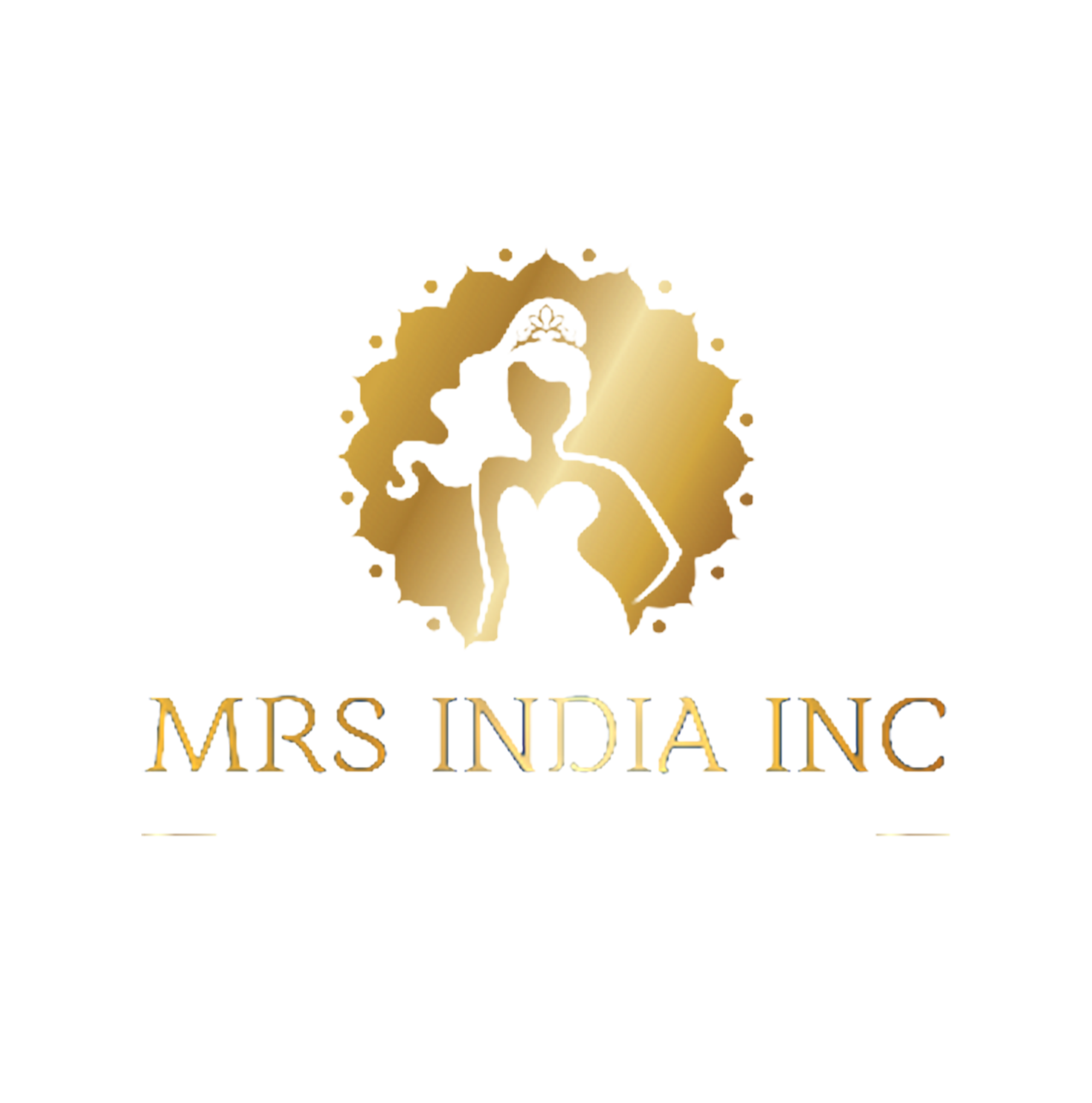
- Formation: 2016; 10 years ago
- Type: Beauty pageant
- Headquarters: Mumbai, India
- Location: Mumbai
- Official language: English, Hindi
- National director: Mohini Sharma
- Affiliations: Universal Woman; Mrs. Globe; Mrs. Galaxy; Mrs. Earth; Mrs. International World
- Website: www.mrsindiainc.in

Mrs. India Inc. is a national beauty pageant for married women in India. Founded by Mohini Sharma in 2016, the pageant selects Indian representatives to compete in Universal Woman, Mrs. Globe, Mrs. Galaxy, Mrs. Earth and Mrs. International World.

== History ==
Mrs. India Inc. was established in 2016 in Mumbai, Maharashtra by Mohini Sharma, a former Mrs. India World 2016 winner.

Notable winners include Navdeep Kaur, who competed at Mrs. World 2021, Juhi Vyas, who represented India at Mrs. Globe 2023 Anuradha Garg, winner of Mrs. Globe 2025 and Sargam Kaushal the winner of Mrs. World 2022.

== Operations ==
Mrs. India Inc. conducts annual competitions, selecting winners to represent India in international pageants.

The pageant emphasises empowerment through training, grooming, and mentorship, preparing contestants for global stages.

Its international affiliations include Mrs. World, one of the oldest pageants for married women, and Mrs. Globe, among others. In 2023, the pageant held its finale week in Colombo, Sri Lanka, marking its first international event, hosted in collaboration with Cinnamon Hotels.

== Titleholders ==
Year	Titleholder	Notes
2025	Sneha Divekar	Crowned Mrs. India Inc 2025.
2024	Ishmeet Kaur	Crowned Mrs. India Inc 2024.
2023	Chetna Joshi Tiwari	Crowned Mrs. India Inc 2023.
2021/2022	Sargam Koushal	Crowned Mrs. India Inc; later won Mrs. World 2022.
2020	Navdeep Kaur	Crowned Mrs. India Inc 2020.
2019	Rashi Jain	Crowned Mrs. India Inc 2020; represented India at Mrs. World 2020.
