= Mrs. Myanmar =

Beauty pageant competition

- Type: Beauty Pageant
- Headquarters: Mandalay
- Location: Myanmar
- Members: Mrs. Universe; Mrs. Globe; Mrs. Grand International; Mrs. International; Mrs. World; Mrs. Earth

Mrs. Myanmar is a married woman's pageant held in Myanmar. The winner and finalists from the contest go on to represent Myanmar in many international pageants.

== International placements ==
=== Current franchise ===
Color keys

- : Declared as Winner
- : Ended as Runner-up or Top 5
- : Ended as one of the Finalists
- : Ended as one of the Semi-finalists
- : Ended as Unplaced and have special awards

=== Mrs. Universe ===
Year	Delegate	Residence	Placement	Special Awards
Virtual 2020	Ame Zin Win		Top 6	
2019	Honey Cho		Winner	

=== Mrs. Grand International ===
Year	Delegate	Residence	Placement	Special Awards
2023	Lê Khaing Khaing		4th runner-up	
2022	Nilar Wint Aung		Mrs. Grand International Standard Winner	Mrs. Friendship Award; Mrs Grand Elegance Ambassador
2022	Sarah Boih		Non-Finalist	Mrs. Popularity Award; Mrs. Best Talent Award

=== I Am Model Search International ===
Year	Delegate	Residence	Placement	Special Awards
2023	Myo Myo Tha Kyaw		2nd runner up	
2022	San Dar Aung		Winner	

=== Mrs Global Asian ===
Year	Delegate	Residence	Placement	Special Awards
2024	Pan Ya Laung		5th Runner-Up	Congeniality Award; Social Media Award

=== TKS Mrs International Pageant ===
Year	Delegate	Residence	Placement	Special Awards
2018	Sue		Elite Mrs International Winner	
2017	Shwe Thaw Thaw		Mrs Asia Pacific Winner	

=== Mrs Worldwide ===
Year	Delegate	Residence	Placement	Special Awards
2022			TOP 12	
2019	La Pyae Linn		Non-Finalist	Mrs Heritage Beauty
2018	Htoo K Khine	Pyay	Non-Finalist	MOST ENCOURAGING WOMAN OF THE YEAR

=== Mrs Heritage International ===
Year	Delegate	Residence	Placement	Special Awards
2023	Nann		Non-Finalist	Mrs Body Beautiful

=== Mrs. Asia Pacific ===
Year	Delegate	Residence	Placement	Special Awards
2019	Latt Latt		Mrs Asia Pacific Intercontinental Winner	

=== Mrs. Global Universe ===
Year	Delegate	Residence	Placement	Special Awards
2019			Non-Finalist	Mrs Women Empowerment

=== Mrs. Tourism ===
Year	Delegate	Residence	Placement	Special Awards
2019			Non-Finalist	Miss Photogenic
2017			Non-Finalist	Mrs Allele White

=== Mrs. Tourism Queen International ===
Year	Delegate	Residence	Placement	Special Awards
2023	San San Yee		Non-Finalist	Mrs. Tourism of Asia

=== Mrs. Inter Nations Global Empowered Women ===
Year	Delegate	Residence	Placement	Special Awards
2018	Ni Ni Aung		Winner	

== See also ==
- List of beauty contests
- Mrs. Universe
- Mrs. World
- Mrs. Globe
