= Tshegofatso =

Tshegofatso/Tshehofatso is a Sotho-Tswana name meaning "blessing." Notable people with the name include:

- Tshego (born 1990), South African-American singer-songwriter
- Tshehofatso Meagan Chauke (born 1992), South African politician
- Tshego Gaelae, South African beauty queen, Mrs. World 2025
- Tshegofatso Mabaso (born 1996), South African soccer player
- Tshogofatso Motlogelwa (born 2000), South African soccer player
