= Wang Canfa =

Chinese environmental lawyer

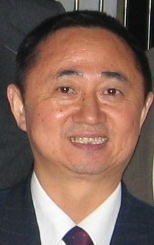
- Born: August 18, 1958 (age 68); Shandong, People's Republic of China
- Citizenship: People's Republic of China
- Education: Peking University, M.A. in Environmental Law
- Occupations: Law professor, environmental lawyer
- Known for: Center for Legal Assistance to Pollution Victims

Wang Canfa (simplified Chinese: 王灿发; traditional Chinese: 王燦發; pinyin: Wáng Cànfā) is a Chinese professor at the China University of Political Science and Law, and the founder and director of the Beijing-based Center for Legal Assistance to Pollution Victims (CLAPV). Wang Canfa is an environmental law expert and he has participated in the drafting of many Chinese environmental regulations. Professor Wang has also provided environmental training to hundreds of lawyers and judges and established a network of environmental advocates in China.

In 1998, Wang Canfa established CLAPV, which was the first center providing legal aid to people and communities injured by pollution throughout China. While Professor Wang has been director, CLPAV has received over 10,000 telephone calls on its hotline asking for assistance and handled over 100 cases. Professor Wang has represented as many 1,700 plaintiffs in a single action, and won a $730,000 ruling against a paper mill and chemical plant in Shandong. Wang Canfa has received many awards, and was recognized on Time Magazine's list of "Heroes of the Environment" in October 2007.

== See also ==
- Center for Legal Assistance to Pollution Victims
- Environmental impact assessment
