= Alisa Krylova =

Russian model

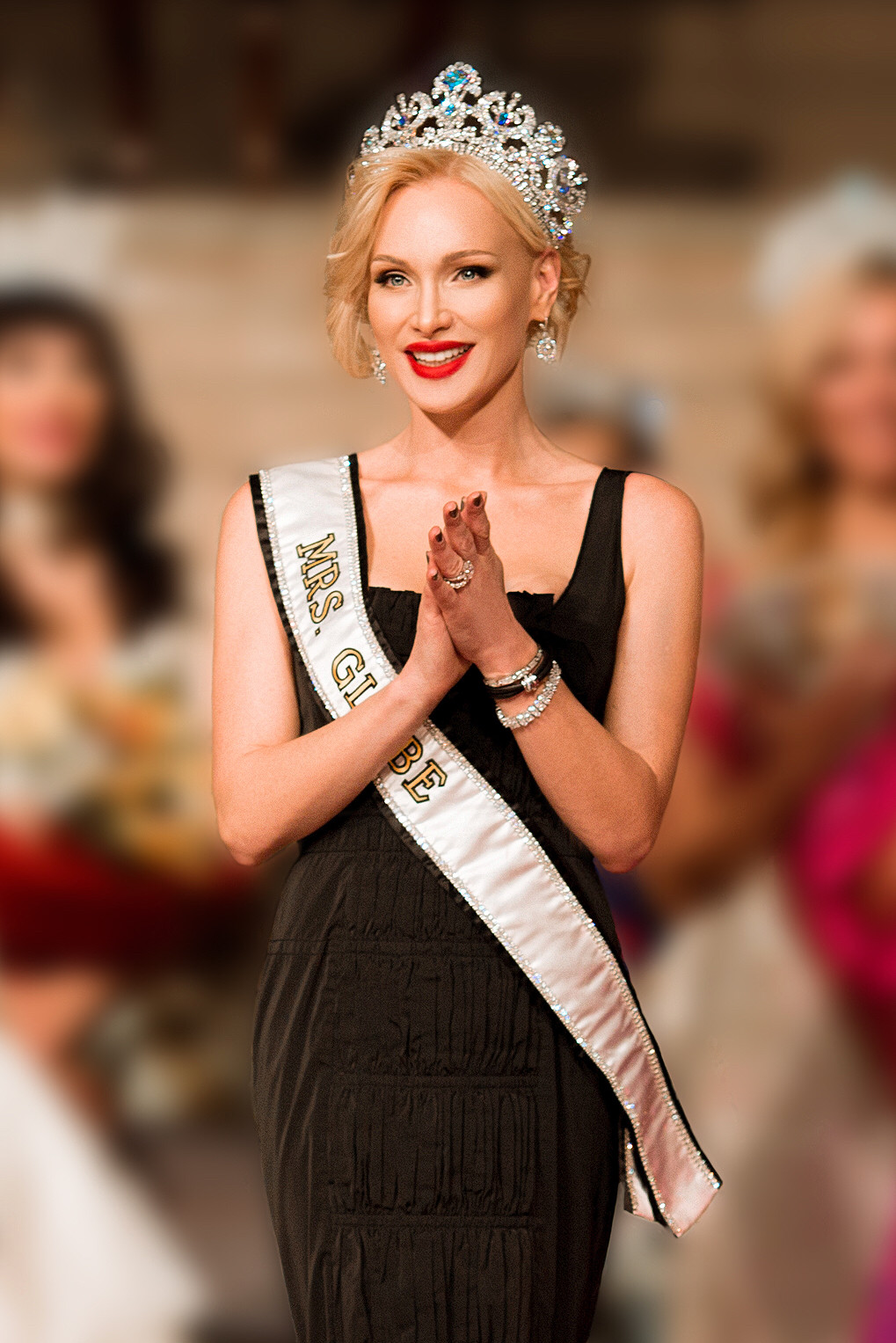
- Alisa Krylova
- Born: Alisa Sergeevna Krylova; June 21, 1982 (age 44); Mirny, Yakutia, Russia
- Occupation: model
- Awards: Mrs. Globe, Mrs. Russia
- Website: alisakrylova.com

Alisa Sergeevna Krylova (rus. Алиса Сергеевна Крылова) — (born June 21, 1982 in Mirny, Yakutia) is a Russian model, the winner of the Mrs. Russia 2010 and Mrs. Globe 2011 beauty contests.

== Life ==
Krylova was the first child in the family, she had 2 brothers and 2 sisters. She studied at the Patrice Lumumba Peoples' Friendship University of Russia, taking a course in "Economics and Law". She also studied at the Moscow State University of Service, specialising of "Anti-crisis Management of the Economy".

On August 28, 2011 the 15th Mrs. Globe 2011 anniversary beauty contest was held in California, which Krylova won.

== Contests ==
Krylova is the winner of the following beauty contests:

- "Mrs. Russia 2010"
- "Mrs. Globe 2011"

== Titles and awards ==
Krylova is the winner of the following titles and awards:

- Mrs. Russia (2010)
- Mrs. Globe (2011)
