= Riana Mooi =

South African beauty queen, Mrs. Globe 2015 winner

- Born: Durban, KwaZulu-Natal, South Africa
- Occupations: financial analyst; Model; beauty pageant titleholder
- Spouse: Craig Mooi (m. 1992)
- Beauty pageant titleholder
- Title: Mrs
- Hair colour: Black
- Eye colour: Brown
- Major competitions: Mrs. South Africa 2015 (1st princess); Mrs. Globe 2015; (winner)

Riana Mooi is a South African risk manager in the financial services industry, model, and beauty pageant titleholder who was crowned Mrs. Globe 2015. Mooi had previously been runner-up at Mrs. South Africa 2015. She is the first woman from South Africa to win the Mrs. Globe title.

== Personal life ==
Mooi was married to Craig Mooi and the couple have two children Brad (born 1992) and Dilon (born 1997).

She holds a Bachelor of Commerce degree from the University of South Africa and a Master of Philosophy degree from Stellenbosch University.

== Pageantry ==
=== Mrs. South Africa 2015 ===
Mooi was first princess to Mrs. South Africa 2015 winner Sarah-Kate Seaward from Hartbeespoort.

=== Mrs. Globe 2015 ===
She was selected as Mrs. Globe South Africa 2015 with the country sending a representative to the competition for the first time in 18 years. She was crowned Mrs. Globe 2015.
