= Olga Tsepilova =

- Born: 1958 (age 67–68)
- Occupation: Sociologist

Olga Tsepilova (born 1958) is a Russian sociologist and senior research fellow at the Russian Academy of Sciences.

She has been studying the social consequences of pollution in Russia, especially in closed nuclear zones like the closed city Ozyorsk in the southern Urals, the site of the infamous Mayak nuclear facility. These studies were not acclaimed by the Federal Security Service (FSB), which has accused her of engaging in espionage.

Tsepilova appeared on Time Magazine's list of "Heroes of the Environment" October 2007.
