= Pontifical Villas of Castel Gandolfo =

Extraterritorial properties of the Holy See in Italy

Coordinates: 41°44′50.12″N 12°39′4.24″E

The Pontifical Villas of Castel Gandolfo are buildings erected in an area of about 55 hectares located in the Roman Castles, in the Metropolitan City of Rome Capital, included among the extraterritorial areas of the Holy See in Italy.

They were granted to the Holy See by the Lateran Pacts of 1929 as they constituted the suburban residence frequented by the popes since the time of Pope Urban VIII (1623–1644).

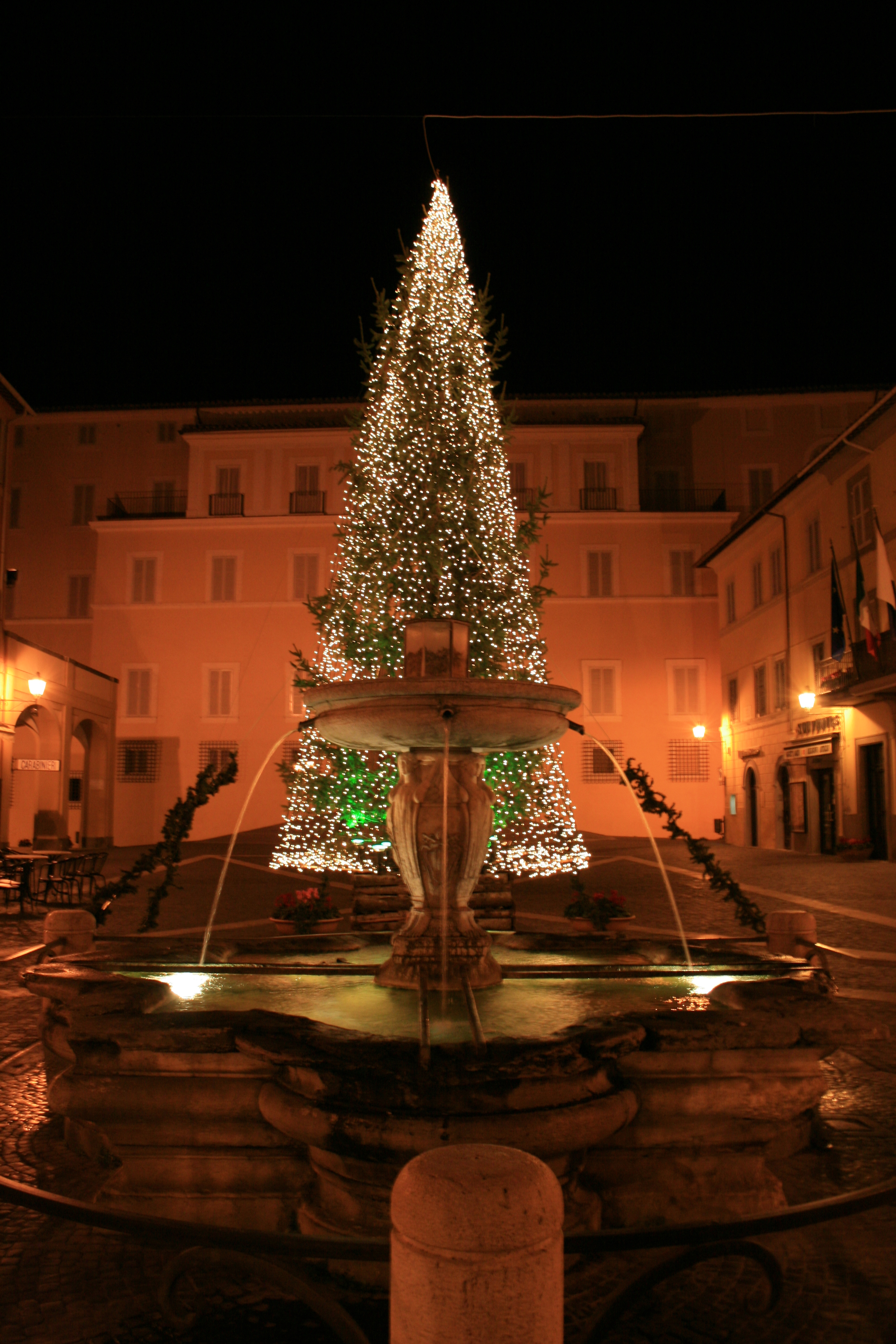
Christmas tree in Liberty Square, in front of the Papal Palace (Christmas 2006)

== History ==
=== Ancient preexisting buildings ===
The crater of the Latian Volcano collapsed about 150,000 years ago, giving rise to several smaller volcanic vents, some of which simply vanished (Vallericcia, Valle Marciana) and others flooded with water (Lake Albano, Lake Nemi).

The slopes of the collapsed volcano became a favored destination for residential tourism of the Roman patriciate since the Republican age. In the ager Albanus, so called from the memory of the legendary Latin capital, the "mother" of Rome, Alba Longa, the ruins of at least two large Republican villas remain, attributed to Publius Clodius Pulcher and Gnaeus Pompeius Magnus. Other more modest villas have been identified on the shores of Lake Albano (at least three), at Cavallacci in Albano Laziale, at Costa Caselle near Marino, and at Palazzolo in the municipality of Rocca di Papa.

All of these properties were in one way or another acquired by the state, and under Octavian Augustus they constituted a single imperial estate known as Albanum Caesari. The last Flavian emperor, Domitian, wanted to build himself a sumptuous villa in the center of this estate, in a panoramic position overlooking both the lake and the coastal plain below. The villa was frequented until the Hadrianic period, and then decayed. Septimius Severus built on the edge of the property the encampment of his veterans of the Legio II Parthica, the Castra Albana, of which abundant ruins remain in the historic center of Albano Laziale.

The Liber Pontificalis reports that under the pontificate of Sylvester I (314–335) Emperor Constantine I donated the villa and other imperial properties in the Alban Hills to the cathedral basilica of St. John the Baptist (probably the ancient Albano Cathedral, today named after St. Pancras). It is not known whether the donation is true or is an apocryphal (like the more famous donation of Constantine), but certainly the villa was abandoned, although perhaps the property was included in some patrimonia or domusculta, typical institutions of the agrarian organization of early medieval Latium.

=== From the Middle Ages to the beginning of the Chamberlain rule ===
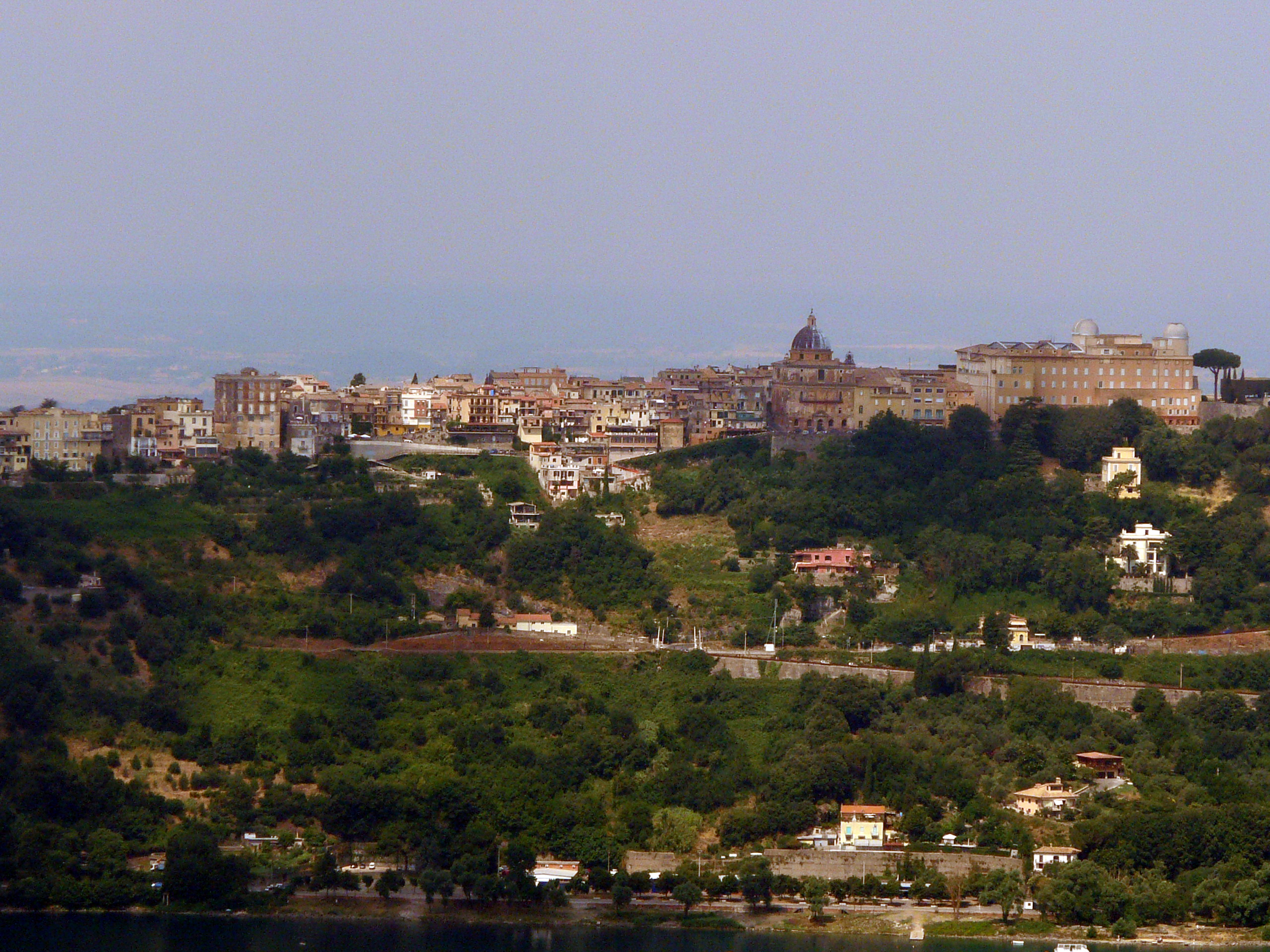
The built-up area of Castel Gandolfo

In the 11th century, the powerful Basilian monastery of Santa Maria di Grottaferrata had important economic interests in the area of Castel Gandolfo, which arose and developed on the edge of the ancient imperial and then ecclesiastical property, around a church dedicated to St. Michael the Archangel, first mentioned in 1116.

Later, around the first half of the 13th century, the fief was occupied by the Gandolfi, a family of Ligurian nobles, who left an everlasting mark on the place name. Between the 13th and 14th centuries, the castle was the subject of alternating changes of ownership between the Gandolfi, the Capizucchi and the Savelli, the powerful Roman baronial family, who came into permanent possession of Castel Gandolfo at the beginning of the 15th century, after the turbulent period of anarchy that in the ecclesiastical territories coincided with the absence and weakness of the Papacy.

The fief followed the alternating fortunes of its owners throughout the 15th century. In 1436, during the war between Pope Eugene IV and the Colonna family (whose allies were the Savellis, along with the Prefects of Vico, in an anti-Orsini capacity), the castle was razed to the ground by Cardinal Giovanni Maria Vitelleschi, field commander of the papal army. It was again taken from the Savellis by Sixtus IV in 1482, during the war between the State of the Church and the Kingdom of Naples; and finally the Savellis, like all other Roman baronial families hostile to the Borgias, were stripped of all their fiefs by Alexander VI, who gave them to his own nephews in 1501.

Upon the death of Pope Borgia in 1503, the Savelli family regained possession of the fiefdom. The powerful family, however, found itself in a very bad economic situation, and several times sold the castle, except to buy it back with the right of pre-emption. In 1585 the fief of Castel Gandolfo was elevated to a duchy; however, the Savelli's debt situation was now so compromised that eleven years later, in 1596, the Apostolic Camera seized the fief in exchange for the payment of 150,000 florins to the creditors of the fallen princes.

Faced with the Savelli's insistence on regaining ownership of the fief and surrendering the remaining shares of the property, Pope Clement VIII became annoyed, declared Castel Gandolfo an inalienable property of the Holy See (1604), had some of the Savelli's properties seized (including Palombara Sabina) and had a significant plaque placed on the facade of the baronial palace that reads: Qui potenti minora negat, maiora permittit (“He who denies the powerful the smallest things, then allows him the greatest”), now walled on the interior facade of the Papal Palace on the side of the gardens.

=== The chamberlain period: from Urban VIII to 1798 ===
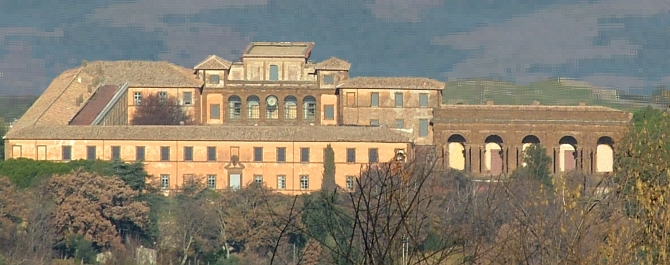
Villa Mondragone, papal residence in the hills between Frascati and Monte Porzio Catone

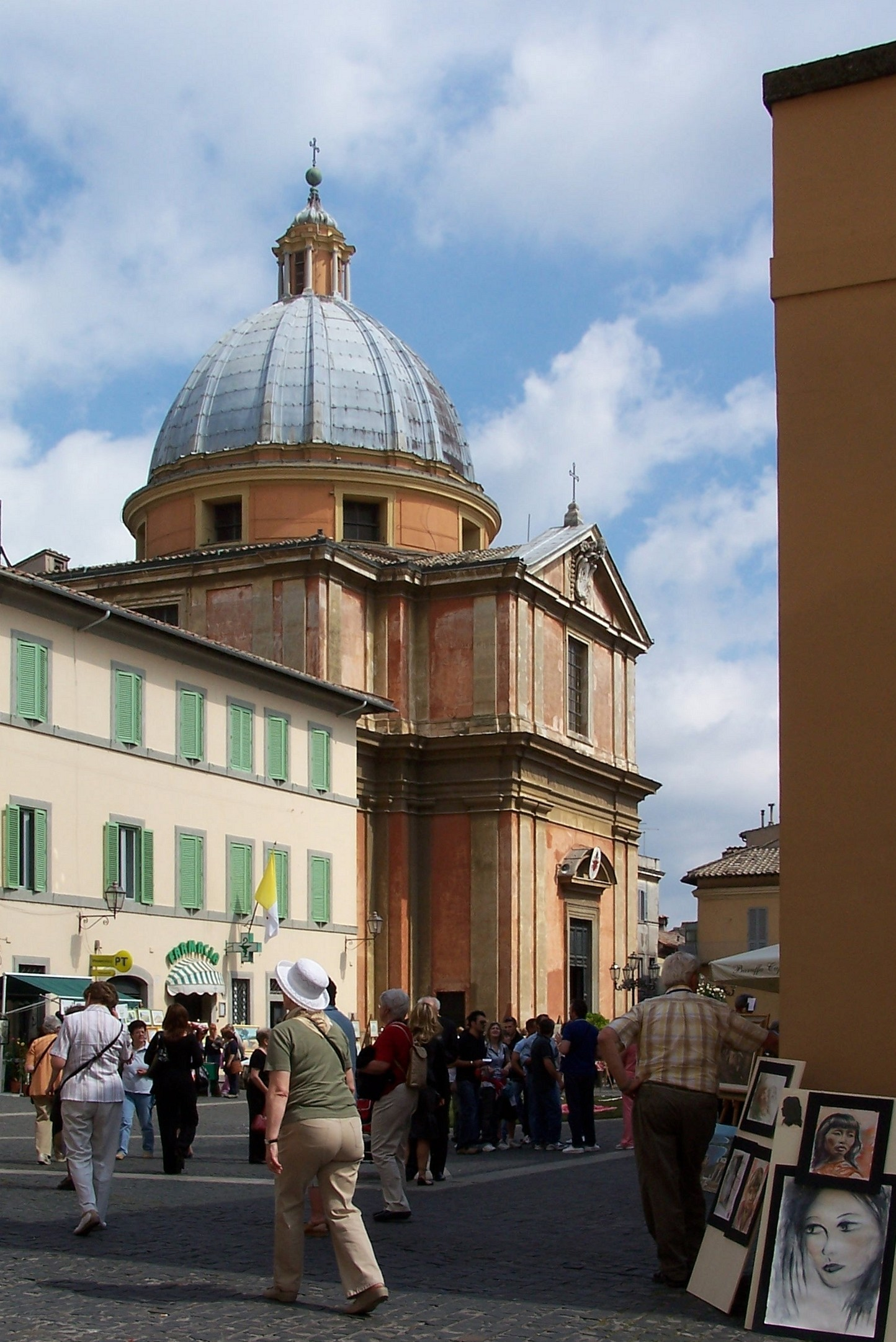
The collegiate church of St. Thomas of Villanova, designed by Gian Lorenzo Bernini in 1658–1661. Bernini, again commissioned by the Chigi family, also worked in nearby Ariccia on the collegiate church of Santa Maria Assunta (1663–1665). It has been noted how, while at Castel Gandolfo he made a Greek-cross church with a strong vertical thrust, at Ariccia he preferred to make a church with a more horizontal circular plan, inserted into the Baroque setting of the Piazza di Corte.

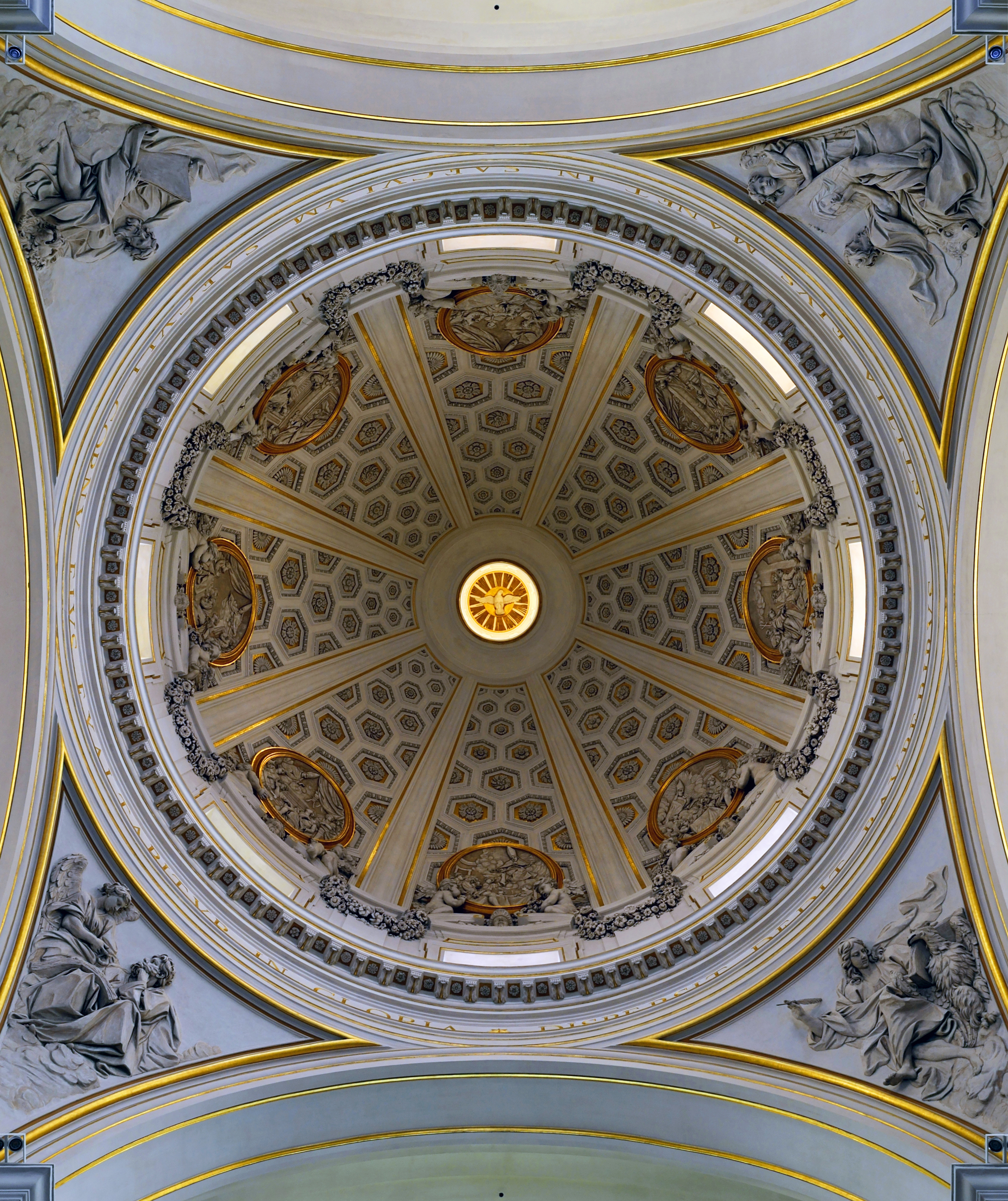
The stuccos of the Bernini-style dome of the collegiate church, the work of Antonio Raggi

The popes, who returned to Rome after the period of the "Avignon Captivity" (1309–1377) and the Western Schism (1378–1417), took up the custom of leaving the Urbe at certain times of the year. Pope Martin V (1417–1431) liked to travel to his native fiefdom of Genazzano, owned by his family, the Colonna family; his successor, Pope Eugene IV (1431–1447) was too caught up in the relentless struggles against the Roman barons, which also forced him to flee (but not to vacation) in Florence; Pope Nicholas V (1447–1455) began construction of the papal complex on the Vatican Hill, outside the Aurelian Walls and in a more salubrious location than the Lateran. The humanist pope, Pius II (1458–1464), loved to travel and described the places he visited in "Commentarii." Pope Paul II (1464–1471) frequented Palazzo Venezia; Pope Sixtus IV (1471–1484) began to frequent the Magliana Castle, built by his nephew Girolamo Riario: and his successors Innocent VIII, Alexander VI, Julius II and Leo X continued to frequent it. Pope Clement VII (1523–1534) had Villa Madama built on the slopes of Monte Mario.

The first pontiff to choose the Alban Hills to establish his suburban residence was Paul III (1534–1549), who established his residence at Villa Rufina, now Falconieri, in Frascati, a suburbicarian bishopric of which he had been cardinal-bishop. However, he inhabited the villa only for short periods, as he went more often to the fiefdoms of his family, the Farnese, in Tuscia.

The first pope who vacationed in Castel Gandolfo was Urban VIII, born Maffeo Barberini. Cardinal Barberini in fact already owned an apartment in Castel Gandolfo, outside the walls near the Porta Romana: and as pope he thought of continuing his castellan vacations, adapting to his new dignity. He therefore commissioned Carlo Maderno, assisted by Bartolomeo Breccioli and Domenico Castelli, to readjust and enlarge the ancient castle and baronial palace of the Gandolfi and Savelli families to its new function as a papal palace: a new wing facing the lake was built, and the back garden, not very large, was planted, substantially unchanged since then. Under the pontificate of Urban VIII the two lower and upper "galleries" were planned, so called because of the thick oaks that created almost a "gallery" of leaves on the street. The work had to be finished by 1629, when a commemorative medal of the new "suburbana aedes pontificum" was minted, as reported by Gaetano Moroni in his "Dictionary of Historical-Ecclesiastical Erudition."

On 10 May 1626, Urban VIII left for his first vacation to Castel Gandolfo. In that same year, Urban VIII was also the first pope to sign an official document with the words (of his own coinage) "ex arce Gandulphi." The following year, on 24 October 1627, he celebrated in the chapel of the papal palace the marriage between his nephew Taddeo Barberini and Anna Colonna, daughter of Prince Filippo I Colonna, duke of Paliano and of nearby Marino, in whose Colonna Palace the guests were served a sumptuous dinner, and the newlyweds spent their wedding night. In 1628 Taddeo himself bought some land at the Pontifical Villa, and in 1631 the nearby villa of Monsignor Scipione Visconti: thus Villa Barberini was created. Urban VIII stopped vacationing at Castel Gandolfo in 1637, after a serious illness. His successor, Innocent X (1644–1655), never went to Castel Gandolfo.

Pope Alexander VII (1655–1667), born Flavio Chigi, returned to use the Castellan Villa, visiting for the first time in 1656. He commissioned Gian Lorenzo Bernini to enlarge the Papal Palace and build the new collegiate church of St. Thomas of Villanova, dedicated to Thomas of Villanova, whom he canonized in 1658. In 1662, Alexander VII commissioned the Observant Friar Minor Giorgio Marziale, formerly Bernini's helper, to reestablish the road from the convent of Santa Maria ad Nives of Palazzolo around the lake from the south to the Galleria di Sopra and Castel Gandolfo, a road that was renamed "via Alessandrina." Gaetano Moroni reports a medal celebrating the works promoted by the pope at Castel Gandolfo coined in 1660.

After Alexander VII, no pope returned to vacation at Castel Gandolfo for forty-four years. Only Innocent XI (1691–1700), finding himself passing through on his way to visit Anzio and Nettuno, spent a night in the Papal Palace: but it was a rainy and foggy evening, and the place made such an impression on him that he never wanted to return.

Clement XI (1700–1721) returned there to vacation in May 1710 on the advice of the archiater Monsignor Giovanni Maria Lancisi, after an illness, and returned to Castel Gandolfo until 1715. In 1710 he conferred on the town the title of Pontifical Villa, which effectively equated the inhabitants with those of the Sacred Apostolic Palaces in the Vatican, placing the fief under the administration of the butler of the Sacred Palaces.

This privilege generated a minor legal controversy, which was dissolved by Pope Benedict XIII with the apostolic constitution "Aequitatis" of 24 September 1728, which confirmed the jurisdiction of Castel Gandolfo to the then butler Camillo Cybo-Malaspina. Castel Gandolfo retained this special status until the end of the Papal States in 1870, apart from the brief Republican (1798–1799) and Napoleonic (1807–1814) interludes.

After Clement XI, another twenty-five years passed without any pope vacationing at Castel Gandolfo: only Benedict XIII (1724–1730) wanted to stay there, on 7 June 1729, on his way back from a visit to the papal exclave of Benevento, during which he had stopped to stay overnight in Albano.

Pope Benedict XIV (1740–1758) returned to vacation assiduously at the Papal Villa between 1741 and 1756: he, among other things, was the pope who issued the most official documents "ex arce Gandulphi." Under his pontificate, the interiors of the Papal Palace were frescoed by Pier Leone Ghezzi (1747) and the new Loggia delle Benedizioni was built with a small bell gable dominating the palace facade (1749).

His successors, Clement XIII (1758–1769) and Clement XIV (1769–1774), also routinely went up to Castel Gandolfo. Clement XIV in particular loved to gallop on horseback through the woods free of his escort and retinue, a passion he had to give up in 1770 after two falls from his horse in the valley separating Villa Cybo from Villa Barberini. In 1773 he concluded the purchase of the three hectares of villa Cybo, the property adjacent to the Pontifical Villa, by paying 18,000 scudi to the duke of Bracciano Livio Odescalchi. The latter had in turn bought the villa from the heirs of Camillo Cybo-Malaspina, the first governor of Castel Gandolfo as Butler of the Sacred Palaces, who had died in 1743.

=== The last sixty years of papal rule (1798–1870) ===
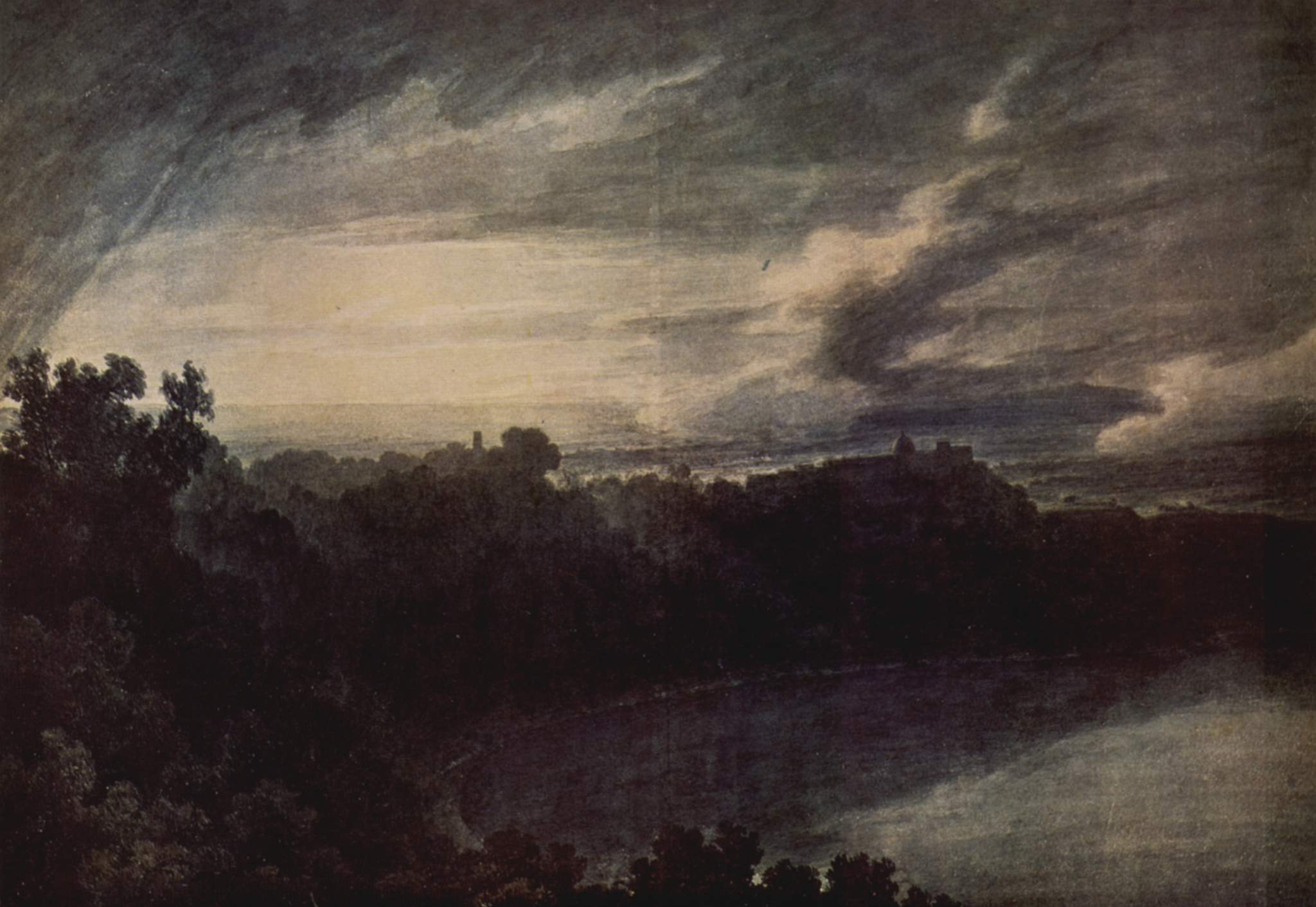
John Robert Cozens, The Lake of Albano with Castel gandolfo (c. 1777), London, private collection

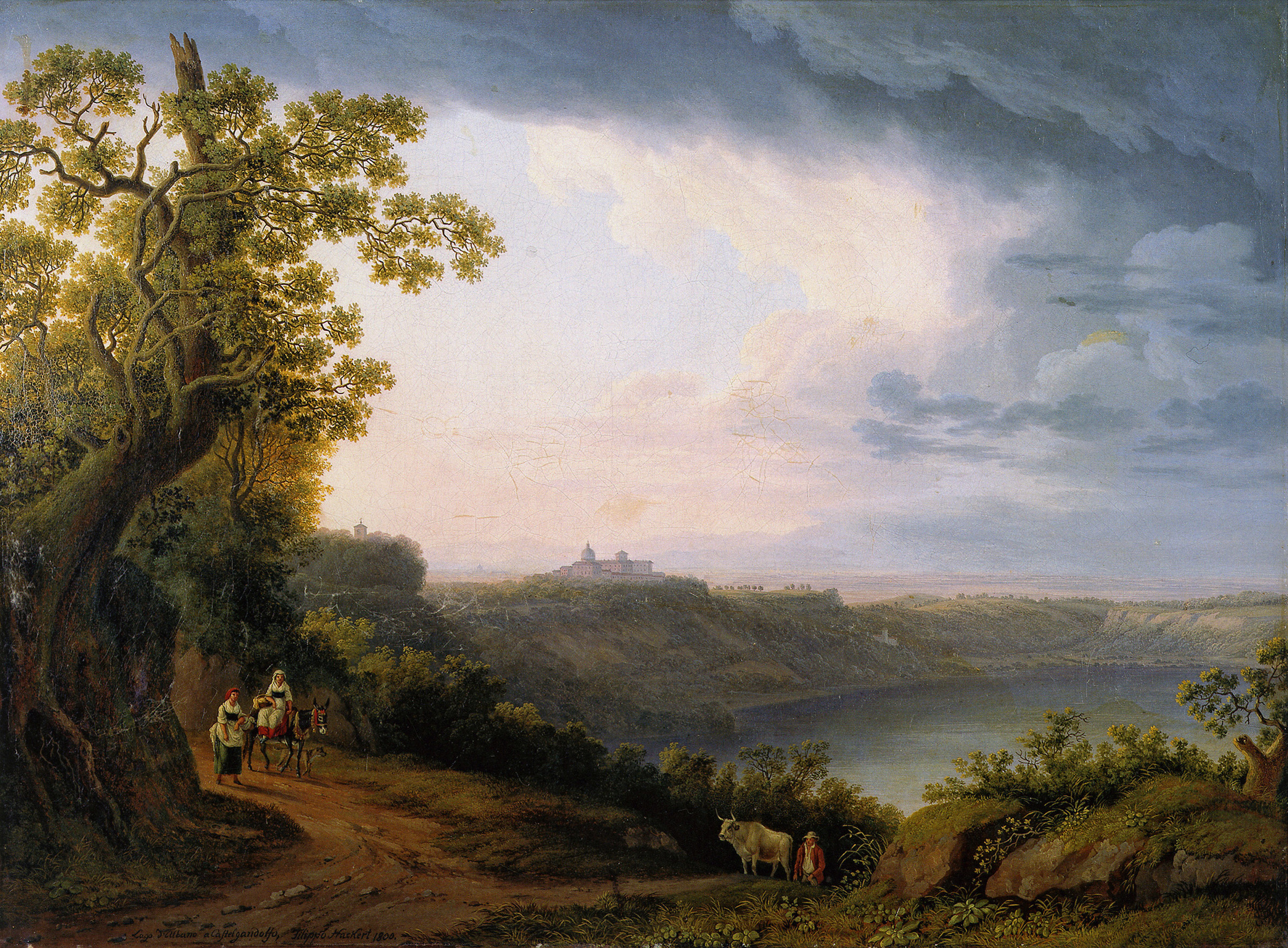
Jacob Philipp Hackert, Blick auf den Albaner See mit Castel Gandolfo (1800), Düsseldorf, Kunstakademie Düsseldorf

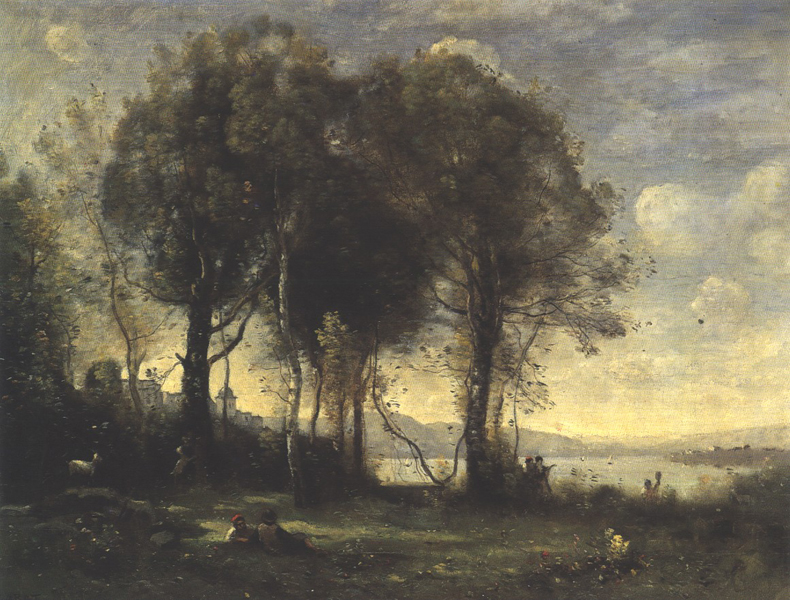
Jean-Baptiste Camille Corot, Le chevriers de Castel Gandolfo (1866), Caen, Musée des Beaux-Arts de Caen

Pope Pius VI (1775–1799) never visited Castel Gandolfo, partly because of the political upheavals that troubled his reign after the French Revolution of 1789. In fact, on the night of 9–10 Feb. 1798, French general Louis-Alexandre Berthier entered Rome; on 15 Feb, the Roman Republic was proclaimed; and on 19 Feb, the pope was forced to leave the Urbe bound for France (he died in August 1799 in Valence, in the department of Drôme).

Meanwhile, a number of towns in the Alban Hills (Albano, Frascati, Velletri, later Marino) had also raised the tree of liberty, proclaiming "sister republics" to that of Rome. However, as the population began to encounter the first inconveniences of a freedom acquired so quickly through foreign intervention, the first counterrevolutionary uprisings began. As early as 25 February, the people of Trastevere rose up to the cry of "Long live Mary! Long live the pope!": news of the riots quickly spread outside the Aurelian walls, and so Albano, Velletri and Castel Gandolfo rose up against the republican government. Immediately from Rome, General Jean-Étienne Championnet, the new French commander of the city after Berthier's promotion to the Army of England, sent Joachim Murat to suppress the riots. In support of the French came some Marinese volunteers commanded by the Frascatan Bartolomeo Bona, who led the French. The clash with the counterrevolutionaries took place on 28 February 1798 on the Appian Way near Due Santi, in Marino territory, and is known as the "battle of Frattocchie": obviously, the poorly armed rebels were dispersed, and Murat went up to Castel Gandolfo, overcoming the fierce resistance of the counterrevolutionaries barricaded in the Papal Palace, which was sacked. He then attacked Albano, which surrendered after weak resistance: chronicles of the time recount that the French brought back to Rome looted pans, mattresses, and silverware, which they resold in St. Peter's Square in the following days, and which the republican newspapers of the Urbe reported as "the spoils of the vanquished enemy."

The French abandoned Rome under pressing Anglo-Neapolitan troops on 29 November 1798, only to recapture the city on 7 Dec and advance as far as Naples, where Championnet established the Parthenopean Republic. Pressed one more time by the advance of the Sanfedists, led by Cardinal Fabrizio Ruffo of Calabria, the French abandoned Naples and then Rome for good in September 1799.

After Pius VI died in deportation to France, the papal throne remained vacant for seven months until the cardinals gathered in Venice and elected Pope Pius VII (1800–1823) in March 1800. The latter returned to Castel Gandolfo in 1803, 1804 and 1805, after having the ravaged palace restored.

In 1809 the French reconquered Rome, Lazio was annexed to the Napoleonic Empire and the pope deported to Fontainebleau. Pius VII was able to return to the Urbe in March 1814, and as early as October he returned to vacation at Castel Gandolfo, receiving there such illustrious guests as Maria Luisa of Bourbon-Spain, former queen of Etruria and mother of Charles II of Parma, and the King of Sardinia Charles Emmanuel IV of Savoy, with the then Minister of Sardinia in Rome Cesare d'Azeglio and his son Massimo.

Upon the death of Pius VII, his successors did not return to Castel Gandolfo for seven years. Leo XII (1823–1829) passed through the village only once, on 21 October 1824, on his way to the Capuchin monastery in Albano; Pius VIII (1829–1830) would have liked to vacation there, but he reigned only twenty months: at any rate in anticipation of his presence, major work was done to reorganize the garden and water pipes.

Gregory XVI (1831–1846), on the other hand, particularly loved to stay at Castel Gandolfo, and also moved from there to visit neighboring towns. He habitually vacationed at the Papal Villa every year until his death, having important road redevelopment works taken care of. This attitude of his attracted the irony of Giuseppe Gioacchino Belli ("Sonetti" 943 and others).

Pius IX (1846–1878) was the last "pope-king" to vacation outside Rome: his last Castellan sojourn lasted from 28 to 31 May 1869, during which the pope wanted to visit the shrine of the Most Holy Crucifix in Nemi. He later returned to Rome for the First Vatican Council, and did not leave again until his death, in voluntary confinement after the Kingdom of Italy entered Rome manu militari on 20 September 1870, reuniting the still papal Lazio with the rest of the nation.

=== From the "Roman Question" to the Concordat ===
Despite repeated attempts by Italian governments to arrive at a conciliation with the Holy See (such as the Law of Guarantees of 1871), Pius IX's successors continued to reject any resolution proposed to them by the Italian side, while softening their stance toward the now united Italy (e.g., with the encyclical Il Fermo Proposito of 1905, the Electoral Union of Italian Catholics of 1910, the Gentiloni Pact of 1913).

However, the popes continued to consider themselves de facto prisoners in Vatican City. Leo XIII (1878–1903) nicknamed the Gregorian Tower of the Leonine Wall "the little Castel Gandolfo," Pius X and Benedict XV continued to show their closeness to the former Castel Gandolfo captives by having two social housing buildings built at the village.

The resolution of the Roman question came only with the signing of the Lateran Pacts on 11 February 1929. Its main promoter, Benito Mussolini, made concessions that previous liberal governments would never have made, and convinced Victor Emmanuel III to accept the agreement. The Vatican City was recognized as a new sovereign state, which was also granted several extraterritorial areas in Rome and beyond.

These included the 55 hectares of the Pontifical Villa of Castel Gandolfo with the appurtenances of Villa Cybo and Villa Barberini (the latter until then outside the pontifical complex). In addition, the Italian State promised to compensate the Holy See for the damage caused by the end of temporal power with 1.75 billion lire, plus another billion in government bonds with a guaranteed yield of 5 percent. The Vatican City was granted exemption from customs duties and taxes.

The Papal Villas complex was further expanded with the purchase of some land toward Albano to plant a farm there, still in operation today to meet the Vatican's internal needs. Pope Pius XI (1922–1939) immediately wanted to have the Pontifical Villas complex restored, bringing in electric light, telephone and services: work began in 1931, and went on until at least 1939; during these interventions, the current gate to Rome was built, replacing the ancient portal designed by Bernini. However, the pope stayed in the Papal Palace as early as 1934.

In 1933 the famous Jesuit astronomical observatory, the Vatican Observatory, was moved to Castel Gandolfo, because in Rome the night sky was becoming increasingly polluted by artificial lighting. The Observatory, originally located in the Roman College building in the Pigna district, had since 1891 moved to the Vatican at the aforementioned Gregorian Tower, which at that time faced the open countryside.

=== World War II ===
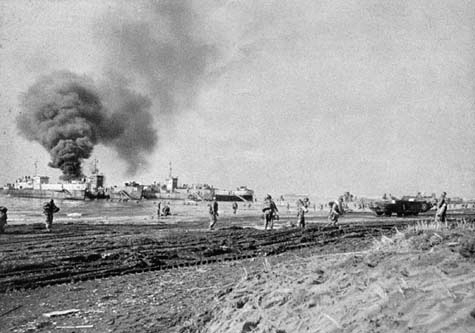
The Anzio beachhead (Anzio Landing)

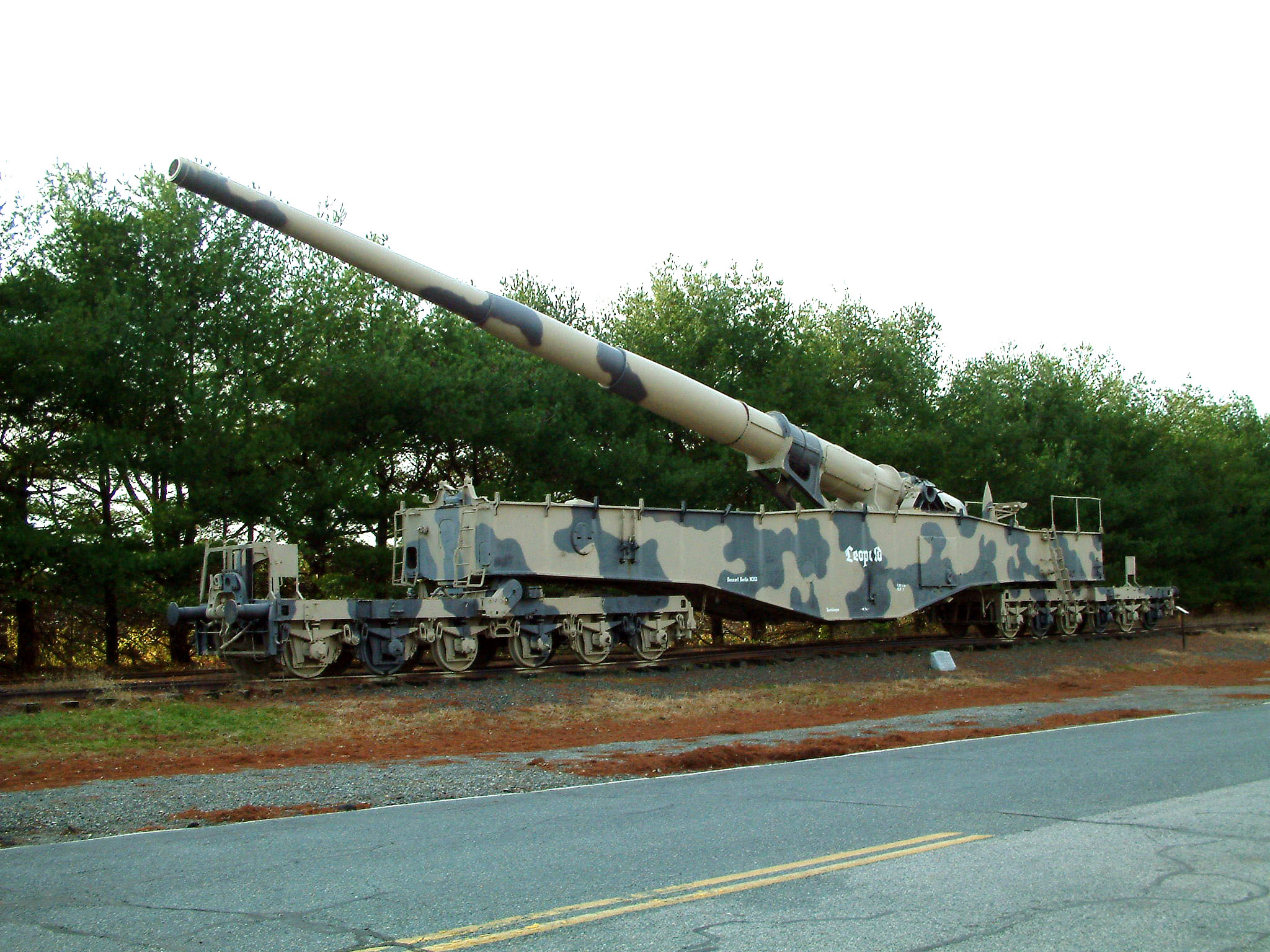
"Anzio Annie," one of two German Krupp K5 238 mm railway guns hidden in the vicinity of Ciampino, which were one of the main targets of the Anglo-American bombardment, but without success. Renamed "Anzio Annie" and "Anzio Express" by the Allies, each of their shots rattled houses even miles away. Today "Anzio Annie" is on display in Aberdeen, Maryland. "Anzio Express," on the other hand, is on display in France, in Audinghen, Nord-Pas-de-Calais. The Germans called them "Leopold" and "Robert," respectively.

Pius XII was elected pope in March 1939, and promulgated his first encyclical, Summi Pontificatus, just "ex arce Gandulphi" on 20 October 1939. World War II had broken out a month before.

Italy entered the war only in June 1940, but in Rome the first war events occurred only from July 1943, after the total defeat of the Italian-German army on the African fronts and the landing in Sicily. The Rome Ciampino Airport was bombed for the first time by the Anglo-Americans on the same day as the bombing of Rome, 19 July; Frascati, the headquarters of the German commander in the Mediterranean Field Marshal Albert Kesselring, was bombed on 8 September 1943, on the very day of the armistice.

Italian troops left to defend Rome from a German punitive expedition, although outnumbered, failed in their task because of the lack of information and orders from military commands. The king and the new Prime Minister Pietro Badoglio fled to Apulia, which was already occupied by the Anglo-Americans: thousands of Italian soldiers were captured by the Germans, in some cases after putting up heroic yet weak resistance, as in the case of the “Piacenza” infantry division at the Battle of Villa Doria in Albano (9 September 1943).

On 22 January 1944, the Anglo-Americans landed at Anzio, creating a bridgehead behind the German front of the Gustav Line. The Roman Castles found themselves catapulted to the rear of the German front, subjected to continuous Anglo-American bombardment. Genzano was hit on 30 January, Albano and Ariccia on 1 February, and Marino on 2 February. The civilian population sought refuge in the Pontifical Villas: the then director Emilio Bonomelli took everyone in, and it is estimated that during the course of the conflict about 12,000 people were housed inside the Villas, camping in the gardens and halls of the Papal Palace. In those months 16 Castellan and 18 Albano children were born in the Villas, helped by volunteer doctors with the help of the few equipment saved from the bombed Albano hospital. Many of them were named Pius Eugene, or Eugenia, in gratitude to Pope Pius XII, born Eugenio Pacelli.

The Anglo-Americans had repeatedly reassured the Holy See about the preservation of the Vatican's religious institutions and properties, which were often also assets of considerable artistic and architectural significance. However, news arrived at Allied headquarters in Algiers on 5 Feb that the Pontifical Villas at Castel Gandolfo were "crammed with Nazis," and that the Germans were quietly passing through the town with their vehicles. The apostolic nuncio to the United States of America, Monsignor Amleto Giovanni Cicognani, categorically denied the rumor, stating that no German soldiers had been admitted to the Pontifical Villas.

On 10 February 1944, between nine and ten o'clock in the morning, two waves of B-17 "flying fortresses" struck the Propaganda Fide college, inside Villa Barberini, in the middle of the extraterritorial zone, massacring unarmed civilians. The minutes of the United States Army Air Forces report a "strategic" mission over Albano, but also that other missions had failed due to bad weather. Judging from aerial photos taken by Allied scouts after the bombing, it was very windy, and the Allied bombers may have missed the target. However, this was not the first time papal neutrality was violated: also on 1 Feb in the bombing of Albano, the convent of the Poor Clares in Piazza Pia, included in the perimeter of the Villas, had been hit, a bombing in which 16 nuns died. And five days after Propaganda Fide, on 15 Feb, there was the more notorious bombing of the abbey of Montecassino during the battle of Monte Cassino. A new air raid, with no casualties, took place on 23 May, coinciding with the raging fighting around the Roman Castles.

Official accounts speak of about 500 dead, but according to some it would be 700 or even 1100: in reality the number of those who died in Propaganda Fide has never been ascertained, due to the gaps in the records of the Court of Velletri and the municipal registry offices: only in Castel Gandolfo were 211 victims ascertained. The "Propaganda Fide" Victims Family Association, established in 2008, aims to have the International Court of Justice in The Hague recognize the Propaganda Fide bombing as a war crime.

The refugees moved away from the Villas for a few days, fearing new bombings: however, they returned as the Allied front advanced. At the end of May 1944, after the breakthrough of the Gustav Line front, the Germans set up the Caesar Line, which ran from the sea to the foothills of the Alban Hills via Velletri, Artena and Valmontone, all locations savagely battered by bombs and cannon fire. Albano, Ariccia and Genzano in that circumstance were displaced, and the population took refuge en masse in Castel Gandolfo; the displacement order also arrived for nearby Marino, but it was avoided thanks to the courage of Zaccaria Negroni, then head of the Marino National Liberation Committee. The Castles avoided the consequences of a very hard static battle when on the night of 3 to 4 June 1944, an American unit found a breach in the German front on Mount Artemisio. Within twenty-four hours Rome was occupied and the Germans retreated north.

In the perimeter of the Pontifical Villas found refuge, among others, Alcide De Gasperi, the former Fascist Minister of Public Education Giuseppe Bottai, officers and straggling soldiers of the aforementioned "Piacenza" division stationed in Albano on 8 September 1943, as well as communist partisans such as Severino Spaccatrosi from Albano. In addition, convoys departed from various localities in the area, provided with credentials and passes for the Germans, who would come to look for flour and milk in the Pontifical Villas or on pontifical properties.

=== From 1945 to the present ===
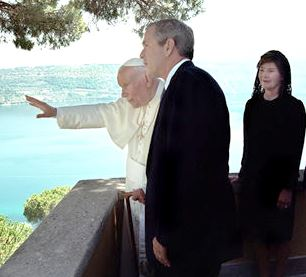
Pope John Paul II and U.S. President George W. Bush with his wife Laura overlooking a terrace of the palace on Lake Albano (23 July 2001)

After the end of the war, Pius XII returned to Castel Gandolfo as soon as the pontifical complex was made habitable again, on 22 August 1946. Pius spent almost a third of his pontificate in the Pontifical Villas, initiating the custom of receiving pilgrims there: since during the Jubilee of 1950 the large crowds of pilgrims forced him to return to Rome for audiences, in 1957 he wanted an audience hall built in the garden of Villa Cybo, which was inaugurated in 1959. He could not see it completed, however, as he died while on a vacation on 9 October 1958: he was the first pope to die at Castel Gandolfo.

In 1948, the new republican state renegotiated with the Holy See the boundaries of the extraterritorial area of the Pontifical Villas, enlarging them further with land acquired in the 1930s under Pius XI for the purpose of creating the pontifical farm.

Pope John XXIII, in his short but intense pontificate (1958–1963), also made his presence felt at Castel Gandolfo. He was the first pope to walk out of the Papal Palace to the collegiate church of St. Thomas of Villanova across the street, 15 August 1959, to celebrate the solemnity of the Assumption of Mary. Pope John left Castel Gandolfo for the last time on 1 September 1962: a month later he opened the Second Vatican Council, and then died, mourned by all as "the good pope."

With Paul VI (1963–1978), the Castellan vacation had now become a regular practice. Beginning with the 1975 Jubilee, the pope began to use the helicopter to travel from the Vatican to Castel Gandolfo: the trip takes only about twenty minutes, and this avoided blocking traffic for security reasons as was the case when the papal motorcade passed by. On 22 September 1974, Pier Paolo Pasolini wrote an article in the Corriere della Sera in which he commented on the now customary "Castel Gandolfo speech" that follows the recitation of the Sunday Angelus, calling it "historic" because the pope would acknowledge in his view that "the new consumerist power is completely irreligious; totalitarian; violent; falsely tolerant, more repressive than ever; corrupting, degrading: therefore, the Marxist intellectual proposed that the Catholic Church stand as the “majestic, but not authoritarian” leader of resistance to rampant consumerism.

Paul VI was the second pope in less than two decades to die at Castel Gandolfo, after a sudden deterioration of his condition, on 6 August 1978. A chapelle ardente was set up in the Papal Palace, until the coffin was transported to the Vatican on 9 August. The pontificate of his successor, John Paul I, lasted only a little more than a month and he did not have time to visit Castel Gandolfo.

John Paul II, on the other hand, had one of the longest pontificates in the history of the Church (1978–2005), and he never failed to vacation at Castel Gandolfo, even during the last period of his harsh illness.

Pope Benedict XVI moved to Castel Gandolfo every summer of his pontificate (2005–2013). From 28 February 2013, the day he resigned the papacy, to the following 2 May, it became the pro tempore residence of the Pope Emeritus, after which he moved to Mater Ecclesiae Monastery in the Vatican. Benedict XVI returned to the Papal Palace for a 15-day stay in July 2015.

Francis (2013–2025), on the other hand, never vacationed at Castel Gandolfo, preferring to stay at the Domus Sanctae Marthae in the Vatican. On 14 October 2016 it was announced that the pope decided to open the entire complex of the Pontifical Villas to the public, making them a museum. On 17 June 2025, a communiqué of the Prefecture of the Pontifical Household was issued which restored the palace to its status as a place of papal residency. The communiqué stated that Pope Leo XIV planned to take up residence in the Palace for part of his summer holidays from 6 to 20 July and from 15 to 17 August of that year. On July 6, 2025, Pope Leo XIV would begin staying at Castel Gandolfo for a six week vacation, thus resuming the tradition of Castel Gandolfo being used as the pope's retreat and summer home. However, the main Apostolic Palace at Castel Gandolfo still remained a museum, with Leo XIV instead staying at the Castel Gandolfo complex's Villa Barberini. He stays at Castel Gandolfo once a week as part of his work and life routine.

Starting in May 2026, the Papal Palace of Castel Gandolfo had minor renovations. Due to the security issues of Villa Barberini, the official Papal Palace will be re-converted back into the pope's summer residence, making it habitable again for Pope Leo XIV to officially move in during July 2026. Pope Leo XIV will become the 16th pope to spend the summer at the official summer residence of the pontiffs. Starting in July 5, Pope Leo will be staying until July 27 at the Apostolic Palace in Castel Gandolfo, which is now once again serving as a papal summer residence after having been converted into a museum by Pope Francis.

== Description ==
Extraterritorial area of the Holy See in Castel Gandolfo and Albano Laziale

=== The Papal Palace ===
The present Papal Palace is the result of the restoration and enlargement of the ancient medieval castle of the Gandolfi family and then the baronial palace of the Savelli family. To date the only memory of these phases is a piece of fresco preserved in the pope's private apartments.

The first intervention on the structure was commissioned by Urban VIII to Carlo Maderno. Later interventions on the building or its appurtenances were made by Gian Lorenzo Bernini (under Alexander VII) and, perhaps, Ferdinando Fuga (under Pope Benedict XIV).

==== The Vatican Observatory ====
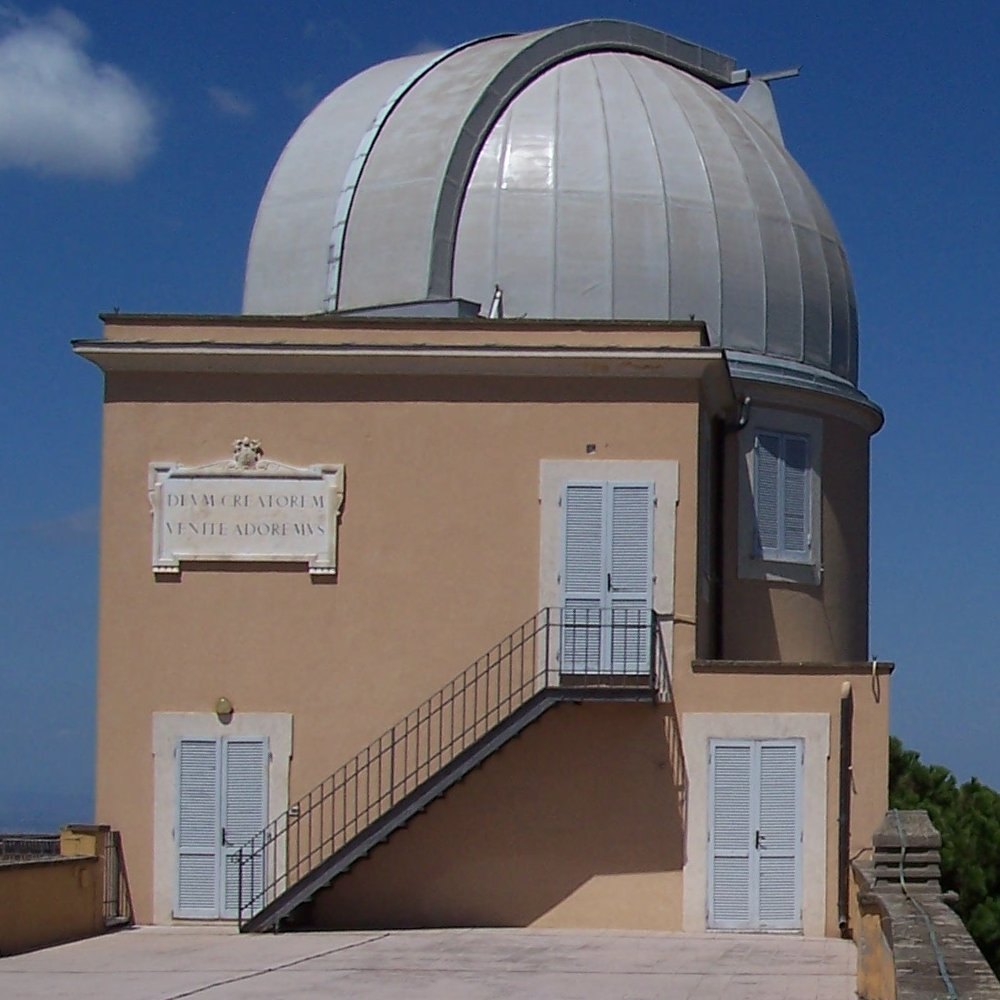
One of the four domes covering the observatory's telescopes.

The entire northern wing of the palace in 1933 was used as an astronomical observatory for the Vatican Observatory.

The observatory has five Zeiss telescopes, some of them detached to Villa Barberini, covered by four characteristic domes, which now make the papal complex immediately recognizable even from afar. Only one is visual, while the others are photographic.

A small museum houses meteorite rock samples and, among them, a moon rock sample collected by the Apollo XVII mission and donated by President Richard Nixon to Pope Paul VI in 1973.

As a result of the 400 percent increase in light pollution in 30 years, since 1995 the Jesuits have been forced to relocate most of the observatory's activities to Mount Graham (3200 m a.s.l.) in Arizona.

=== Villa Cybo ===
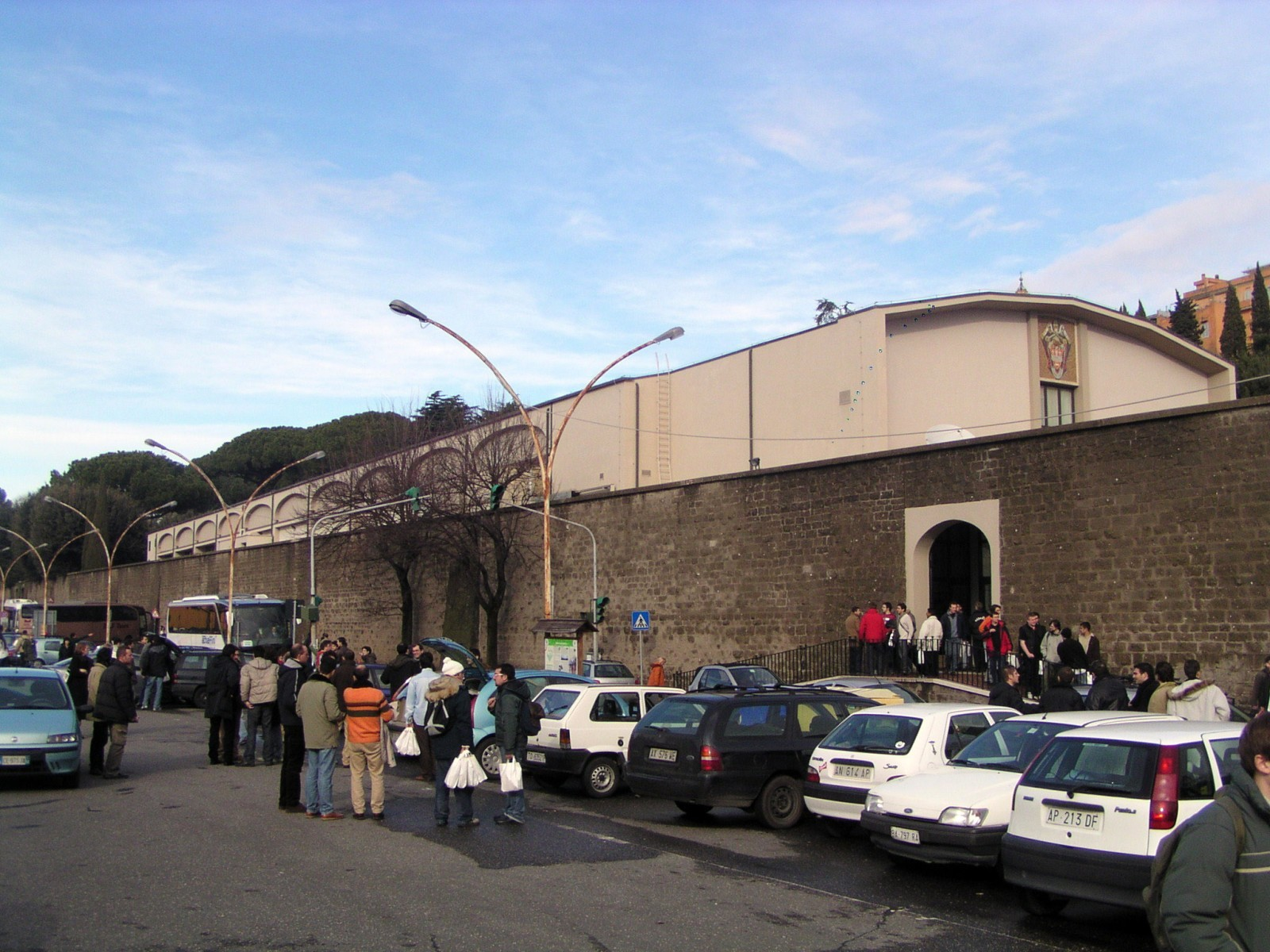
Audience Hall, now the Mariapolis International Center.

The mansion of this villa was designed by architect Francesco Fontana, who had been appointed surveyor of the Papal Villa by Pope Clement XI in 1706, and planned to build himself a villa next to the Papal Villa. It was originally to be connected to the main body of the villa and the Papal Palace by an overpass with gallery, which was not built.

In 1717 the villa was purchased by Cardinal Camillo Cybo-Malaspina, Butler of the Sacred Apostolic Palaces and first governor of Castel Gandolfo. From his heirs it was sold for 18,000 scudi to the Duke of Bracciano Livio Odescalchi, who sold it for the same price in 1773 to Clement XIV, who wanted to annex it to the early Papal Villa.

In 1841 Gregory XVI entrusted the mansion to the Brothers of the Christian Schools, for use as a boys' school.

As part of the villa, the Audience Hall was built, commissioned by Pius XII in 1957, designed by architect Enrico Galeazzi and inaugurated by John XXIII in 1959.

John Paul II entrusted it to the Focolare Movement, which has its International Center in nearby Rocca di Papa. They renamed it the "Mariapolis Center," and routinely use it for the purpose of congresses that attract many lay and consecrated people.

=== Villa Barberini ===
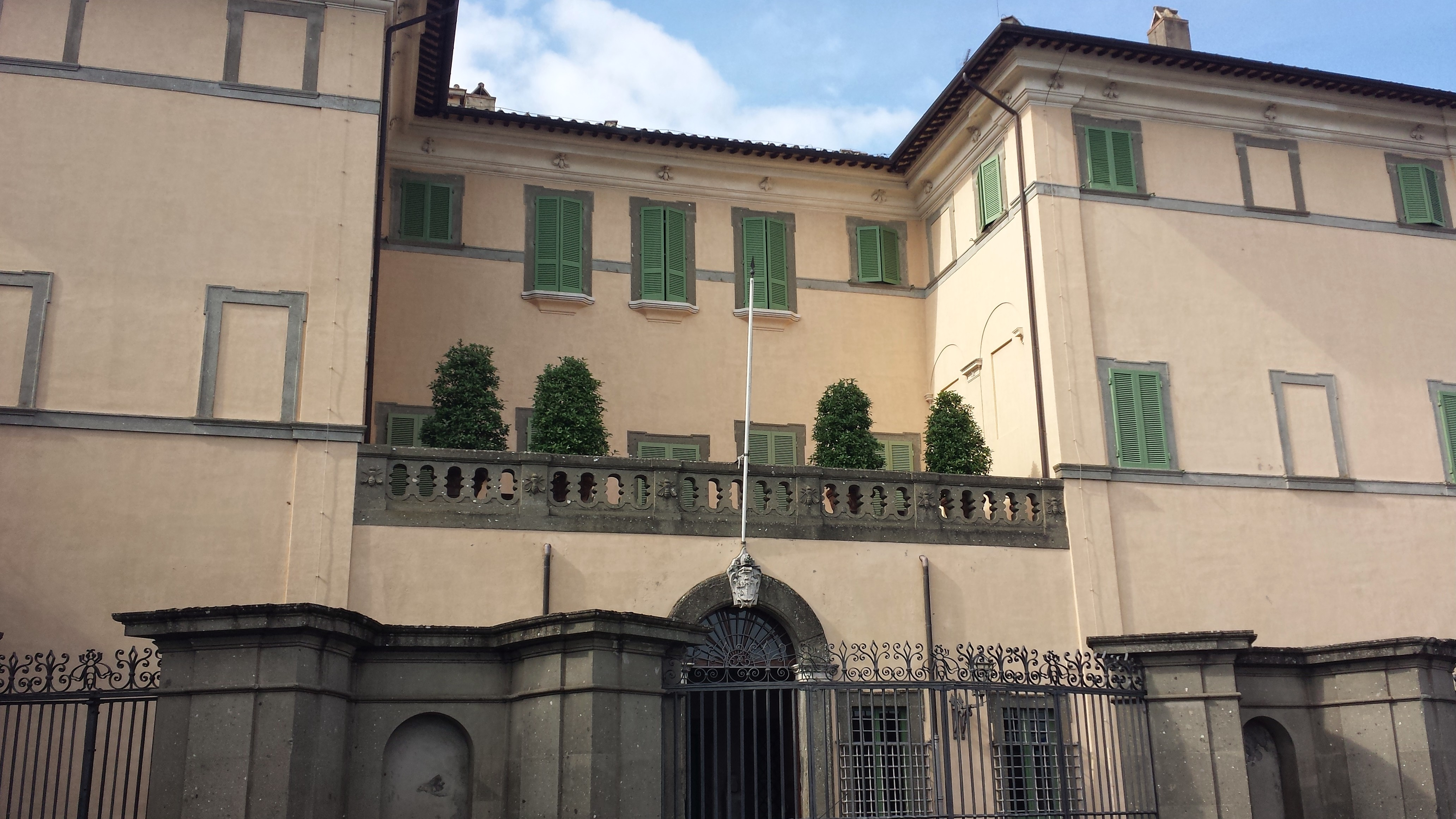
Villa Barberini

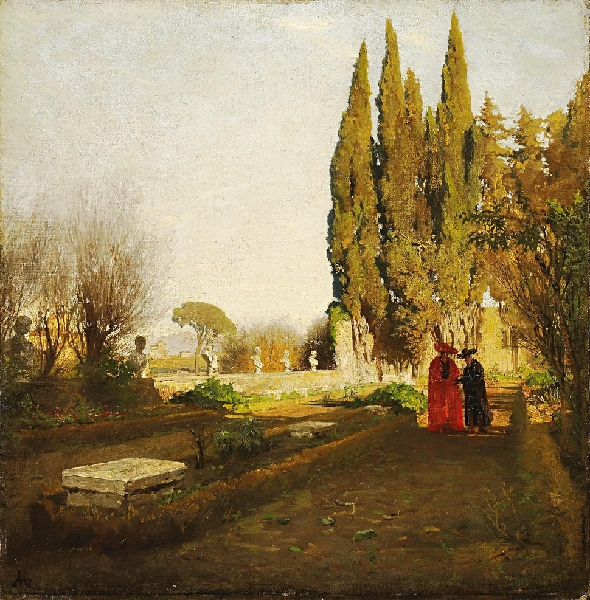
Walk through Villa Barberini. Albert Hertel (Berlin, 1843–1912), In den Gärten von Castel Gandolfo, exact date unknown (1870s)

The villa was established by Taddeo Barberini, nephew of Urban VIII, acquiring two properties in 1628 and 1631. Work on the construction of the mansion and the landscaping of the gardens, apparently entrusted to Gian Lorenzo Bernini, ended in 1635. The mansion consists of the extension of the pre-existing hunting lodge of Monsignor Scipione Visconti: and in some parts of the villa the coat of arms of the “biscione" of the Milanese Visconti family still remains.

Two Zeiss telescopes from the Vatican Observatory, dated 1935, are detached in the villa.

Within the villa's properties are abundant ruins of the residential and monumental area of Domitian's villa, such as the theater and cryptoporticus, the hippodrome and other minor structures.

The villa is connected to Villa Cybo and the Papal Palace by a viaduct that spans the small valley where the confluence (now with traffic lights) of the two Galleries, above and below, is located. The viaduct was built in 1773, after Clement XIV fell from his horse at that very spot in 1770, fracturing his shoulder. Of the viaduct, the section that crosses the road, popularly known as the "Colonnade," is visible from the street, which was rearranged under Pius XI with a peperino ashlar facing.

The villa's enclosing walls are accompanied by the Gallerie di Sopra e di Sotto, the tree-lined streets (now actually much ruined) that Urban VIII had rearranged between 1629 and 1631.

=== Summer College of Propaganda Fide ===
The former convent of the reformed Friars Minor housed the summer branch of the Pontifical Urban College of Propaganda Fide.

=== The convent of the Poor Clares of Albano ===
The Convent of the Immaculate Conception, popularly called by the people of Albano "of the buried alive," or "of the Farnesian nuns," is inhabited by strictly observant Poor Clare nuns. Its foundation was authorized by Pope Urban VIII with a papal bull dated 8 September 1625, but it was not opened until 1631 due to the involvement of Princess Caterina Savelli.

The convent was severely hit by Anglo-American air raids on 1 February 1944, which destroyed the building, killing 16 nuns. Today it has been rebuilt and is located within the perimeter of the Pontifical Villas. Among other things, the community of Poor Clares is involved in the production of hosts for much of the diocese of Albano. In addition, the nuns are dedicated to painting sacred pictures and icons.

The Piazza Pia in front of it is the largest square in Albano's historic center, opened in the seventeenth century as part of the urban reorganization of the town to create the "trident" of streets. It took its current name in 1847, in memory of Pope Pius IX's visit to Albano the previous year: the name of the square has since undergone a series of ups and downs, which have not, however, changed its popularly recognized name. The square has been the scene of several visits by popes since that of Pius IX: from the gate of the Pontifical Villas overlooking the square, which is permanently guarded by the police, Paul VI in 1963, John Paul II in 1982 and Benedict XVI in 2008 have in fact left.

== See also ==
- Castra Albana
- Lake Nemi
- Bovillae
- Basilica of San Barnaba
- Frascati

== Bibliography ==
- Moroni, Gaetano (1844). Dizionario di erudizione storico-ecclesiastica [Dictionary of historical-ecclesiastical erudition] (in Italian). Venezia: Tipografia Emiliana.
- Ricci, Giovanni Antonio (1787). Memorie storiche dell'antichissima città di Alba Longa e dell'Albano moderno [Historical memoirs of the very ancient city of Alba Longa and modern Albano.] (in Italian). Rome: Giovanni Zempel. p. 272.
- Nibby, Antonio (1848). Analisi storico-topografico-antiquaria della carta de' dintorni di Roma [Historical-topographical-antiquarian analysis of the map of the environs of Rome] (in Italian). Rome: Tipografia delle Belle Arti. p. 546.
- Lugli, Giuseppe (1915). Le antiche ville dei Colli Albani prima dell'occupazione domizianea [The ancient villas of the Alban Hills before the Domitian occupation] (in Italian). Rome: Loescher.
- Lugli, Giuseppe (1920). La villa di Domiziano sui Colli Albani: parte II [Domitian's villa in the Alban Hills: part II] (in Italian). Rome: Maglione & Strini.
- Coarelli, Filippo (1981). Guide archeologiche Laterza – Dintorni di Roma [Archaeological guides Laterza – Surroundings of Rome] (in Italian). Bari-Rome: Casa editrice Giuseppe Laterza & figli.
- Petrillo, Saverio (1995). I papi a Castel Gandolfo [The popes at Castel Gandolfo] (in Italian). Velletri: Edizioni Tra 8 & 9.
- Nisio, Graziano (2008). Dalla leggendaria Alba Longa a Castel Gandolfo [From the legendary Alba Longa to Castel Gandolfo] (in Italian). Castel Gandolfo: Il Vecchio Focolare.
- Del Pinto, G. (1918). Albano nel 1798 [Albano in 1798] (in Italian). Rome.
