= Hammerskjoeld Simwinga =

Zambian environmentalist

- Born: c. 1963 (age c. 62)
- Other names: Hammer
- Employer(s): Foundation for Wildlife and Habitat Conservation
- Honours: Goldman Environmental Prize

Hammerskjoeld Simwinga (born c. 1963) is a Zambian Environmentalist. He received the Goldman Environmental Prize in 2007 for his efforts to stop elephant poaching through community economic initiatives. He was named after former United Nations Secretary General Dag Hammarskjöld, who died in a plane crash in Zambia in 1961.

Hammer Simwinga appeared on Time Magazine's list of "Heroes of the Environment" October 2007.

Hammer is the founder and Executive Chairman of the Foundation for Wildlife and Habitat Conservation, headquartered in Muchinga Province in Northern Zambia. He is currently spearheading the creation of the Mukungule Community Nature Conservancy, to be Zambia's first community-initiated and -operated nature conservancy. Nearly all conservancies and park concessions in Africa are managed and owned by foreigners or white Africans, often brutally displacing local people. The Mukungule Community Nature Conservancy seeks to generate a new paradigm for involving local communities in conservation, including an innovative, inclusive planning process.
