= Von Hernandez =

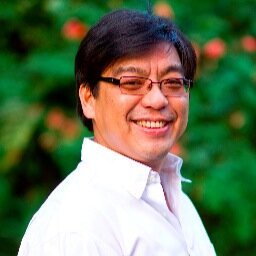
- Born: Philippines
- Awards: 2003 Goldman Environmental Prize awardee

Von Hernandez is an environmental activist from the Philippines. He was Executive Director of Greenpeace Southeast Asia (GPSEA) from 2008 to 2014, where he led the environmental group's programs and operations in the Southeast Asian region. Prior to that, he served as Campaigns Director for the organization. He serves as Development Director for Greenpeace International.

== History ==
Hernandez initiated and led a number of campaigns in the Philippines including the approval of laws like the Ecological Waste Management Act and the Clean Air Act. He also spearheaded campaigns to rehabilitate the Pasig River as well as efforts to clean up toxic sites in former US military bases in the country. He founded and spearheaded the Global Alliance for Incinerator Alternatives (GAIA), Waste Not Asia, Lakbay Kalikasan, the Ecowaste coalition, and the Sagip Pasig Movement.

Hernandez is a former literature professor and environmental activist. He has spoken up against the processing of imported garbage, when waste incinerators generate dioxins and other harmful chemicals. The Philippines was the first nation in the world to ban waste incineration nationwide, in 1999. Hernandez works with Greenpeace Southeast Asia, serving as its executive director.

== Education ==
Hernandez graduated from the University of the Philippines, with a bachelor's degree in English. He completed his Master in Public Management (MPM) degree from the National University of Singapore.

== Awards ==
- 2003 Goldman Environmental Prize.
- Time magazine's list of "Heroes of the Environment" October 2007.
