= Mrs. Grand International =

International beauty pageant franchised based in Myanmar

Mrs Grand International
- Type: Beauty Pageant
- Headquarters: Mandalay
- Location: Myanmar
- Key people: Khunn Hsett Han (President).
- Website: mrsgrandinternational.com

Mrs Grand International also known as Mrs Grand is a beauty pageant franchise based in Myanmar. It consists of the annual national pageant Mrs. Myanmar, as well as the international competition Mrs Grand International, to which participating rights are licensed to organizers in other countries. This competition is for women, Advocating for the rights of families and children, in partnership with UNFPA and UNICEF, focuses on strengthening the rights of children and women around the world.

The current Mrs Grand International is Dr. Saiprasanna Behera of India who was crowned on 29 November 2023.

== Recent titleholders ==
Year	Country	Mrs Grand International	National title	Venue	Number of entrants
2022	Vietnam	Phan Kim Oanh	Mrs Grand Vietnam 2022	Mandalay, Myanmar	23
2023	india	Dr. Saiprasanna Behera	Mrs Grand India 2023	Mandalay, Myanmar	22

== Placements ==
Mrs Grand International 2023 competition result
Color key:
Winner	Top 10 (5th runners-up)
1st runner-up	Top 20
2nd runner-up	Unplaced
3rd runner-up	Withdrew
4th runner-up	No representative

Placement	Contestant
Mrs Grand International 2023	India – Dr. Saiprasanna Behera
1st runner-up	Philippines – Zia Gee Cay ‡ ∆
2nd runner-up	(African Union) Africa – Carika Bebb
3rd runner-up	Vietnam – Nguyen Hue
4th runner-up	Myanmar – Lê Khaing Khaing

Placement	Contestant
Mrs. Grand Royal International 2022	Suriname – Sylvani
Mrs. Grand Classic International 2022	Thailand – Napuk Mutthasathean
Mrs. Grand Supreme International 2022	Vietnam – Phan Kim Oanh
Mrs. Grand Standard International 2022	Myanmar – Nilar Wint Aung
Mrs. Grand Imperial International 2022	Philippines – Meer-Banzuela
Top 8	South Africa – Mokganyetsi Mashele
Top 8	Canada – Leonor Garrison
Top 8	India – Amordeep Gill
Mrs Grand International (MGI) Ambassadors
Mrs. Grand Standard International	South Africa – Mokganyetsi Mashele
Mrs. Grand Classic International	India – Amordeep Gill
Mrs. Grand Royal International	Canada – Leonor Garrison
Special Awards
Best in National Costume	Suriname – Sylvani
Mrs Photogenic	Philippines – Meer-Banzuela
Mrs Friendship	Myanmar – Nilar Wint Aung
Best in Talent	Myanmar – Sarah Boih
Mrs Grand Popularity	Myanmar – Sarah Boih
Best Model Award	Philippines – Meer-Banzuela
Best in Evening Gown	Philippines – Meer-Banzuela
Mrs Grand Elegance Ambassador	Myanmar – Nilar Wint Aung
Best in Intelligence	Canada – Leonor Garrison
Best in Body	Vietnam – Phan Kim Oanh
