= Candice Abrahams =

South African beauty queen, Mrs. World 2016 winner

- Born: Candice Deborah van Leeve; 7 January 1983 (age 43); Bluff, KwaZulu-Natal, South Africa
- Occupations: Model; beauty pageant titleholder
- Spouse: Ismail Abrahams (m. 2005)
- Beauty pageant titleholder
- Agency: Ace Models Waterfall
- Hair colour: Brown
- Eye colour: Brown
- Major competitions: Mrs. South Africa 2016 (winner); Mrs. World 2016; (winner)

Candice Abrahams (née van Leeve) is a South African model and beauty pageant titleholder who was crowned Mrs. World 2016. Abrahams had previously been crowned Mrs. South Africa 2016. She is the first woman from South Africa to win the Mrs. World title.

== Personal life ==
Abrahams was born Candice Deborah van Leeve to Deborah (Debbie) and Samson van Leeve on 7 January 1983. She attended Fairvale Secondary School.

She is married to Metro FM radio personality Ismail Abrahams and the couple have two children, Samia (born 8 May 2005) and Taai (born 16 January 2010).

== Pageantry ==
She had previously been crowned Miss East Coast Radio, Miss Jam Alley, and Miss Organics Beautiful Hair.

=== Miss South Africa ===
Abrahams made it to the top 16 of Miss South Africa in 2001.

=== Mrs. South Africa 2016 ===
She was crowned the winner on Friday, 9 October 2015 at the Theatre of Marcellus in Emperors Palace, beating runner-up Aldytha da Silva from Durban and second runner-up Marlene Naiker from Buccleuch to the crown.

=== Mrs. World 2016 ===
Abrahams was crowned Mrs. World 2016 in Dongguan, China with Mrs. Poland as the runner-up and Madeline Mitchell of the US as the second runner-up.
