= Center for Legal Assistance to Pollution Victims =

- Founded: 1998
- Purpose: Environmentalism
- Location: Beijing, China
- Method: Litigation, training
- Website: clapv.org

The Center for Legal Assistance to Pollution Victims or CLAPV (Chinese: 污染受害者法律帮助中心) at the China University of Political Science and Law is a legal-aid office, training center, and one of the most effective environmental groups in China.

CLAPV was established in October 1998 by Professor Wang Canfa. It was approved by China University of Political Science & Law and registered with the Chinese Judicial Ministry. According to Professor Wangcafa, "China has many laws and regulations regarding the environment, but the situation just gets worse, because they are often not implemented."

Goals of CLAPV include promoting "enforcement of environmental law," and to "tell the public how to respond when your rights are violated."

CLAPV had answered more than 10,000 calls for assistance to its hotline and pursued over 100 cases, some with as many as 1,700 plaintiffs.
