= Palace of Castel Gandolfo =

Extraterritorial property of the Holy See in Italy

- Palazzo Apostolico di Castel Gandolfo (Italian)
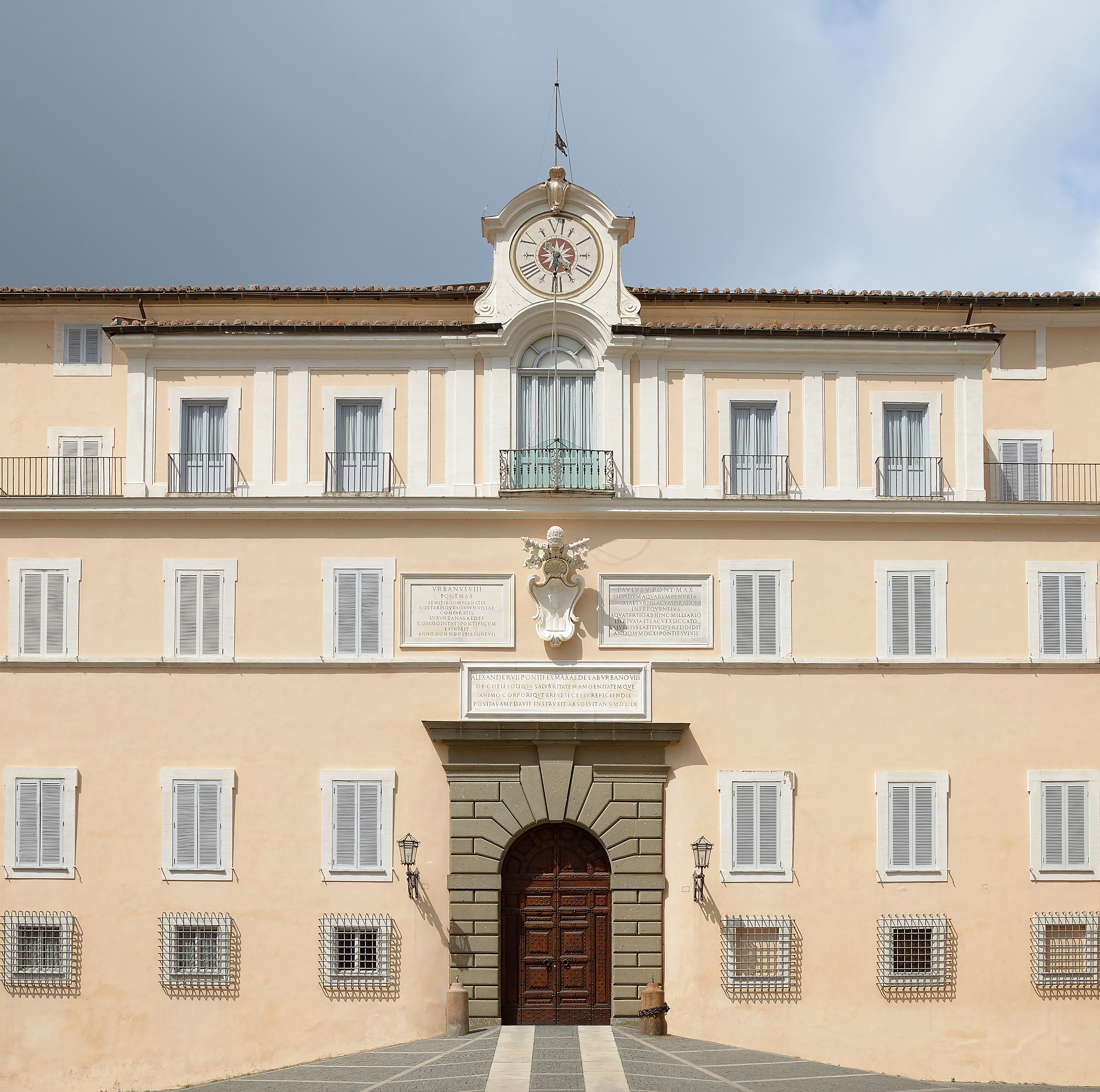
- The facade of the Apostolic Palace of Castel Gandolfo in 2015

- Location within Italy
- 41°44′49.56″N 12°39′1.08″E

Site notes
- Area: 54.6 ha (135 acres)
- Governing body: Holy See

The Papal Palace of Castel Gandolfo, or the Apostolic Palace of Castel Gandolfo from its Italian name Palazzo Apostolico di Castel Gandolfo, is a 54.6-hectare (135-acre) complex of buildings in a garden setting in the city of Castel Gandolfo, Italy, including the principal 17th-century villa, an observatory and a farmhouse with 30.4 hectares (75 acres) of farmland. The main structure, the Papal Palace, has served for centuries as a summer residence and vacation retreat for the pope, the leader of the Catholic Church, and is afforded extraterritorial status as one of the properties of the Holy See, though the main Apostolic Palace building served as a museum from 2016 until July 5, 2026. It has been restored as the summer residence once again. It overlooks Lake Albano.

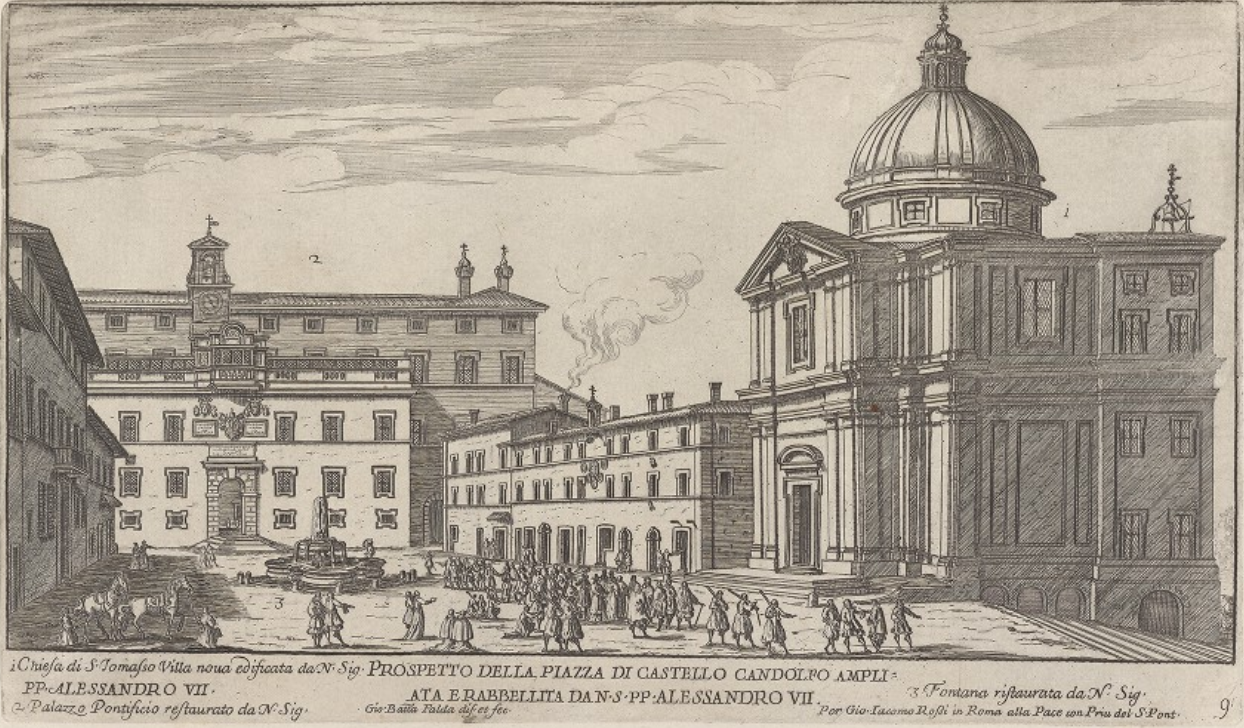
Prospetto della Piazza di Castello Gandolfo by Giovanni Battista Falda

== History ==
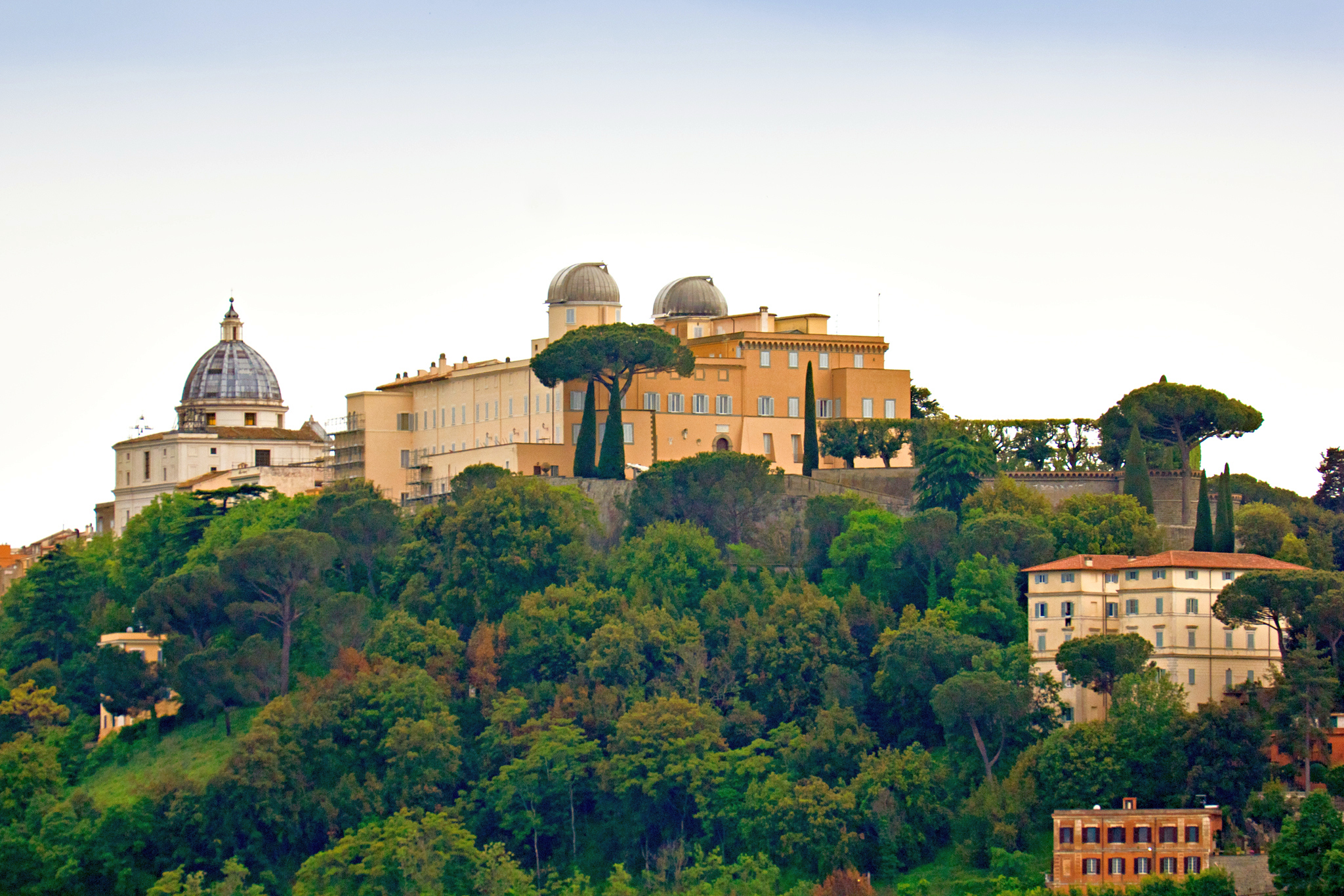
Palace of Castel Gandolfo with the domes of the Vatican Observatory visible at centre

The Vatican acquired the castle in 1596, in payment of a debt owed by the Savelli family. It dated from the 13th century.

The gardens occupy the site of a residence of the Roman Emperor Domitian. The palace was designed by Swiss-Italian architect Carlo Maderno for Pope Urban VIII, who began using it in the spring of 1626. Since then, about half of his successors have used the properties as a summer residence and vacation retreat, except for the years between 1870 and 1929 when the popes, in dispute with Italy over territorial claims, did not leave Vatican City. Pope Pius XI had the facilities modernized and began using the retreat again in 1934. In accordance with the Lateran Treaty of 1929, the palace and the adjoining Villa Barberini added to the complex by Pope Pius XI are extraterritorial properties of the Holy See.

During World War II, an unknown number of Jewish refugees took shelter at the palace under the protection of the Holy See and many people used the site as a refuge from Allied bombing raids in 1944, though more than 500 people died in one such attack.

Pope Pius XII died at the palace in 1958, as did Pope Paul VI in 1978. Pope John Paul II had a swimming pool built at the palace, which was criticized by some. Paparazzi used the opportunity to take photos of him.

Pope Benedict XVI flew to the palace at the conclusion of his papacy on 28 February 2013, was joined by Pope Francis for lunch on 23 March, and returned to Vatican City on 2 May. Francis visited the property twice more, but never stayed overnight. In June 2013, Francis announced he would not spend the summer in Castel Gandolfo as many of his predecessors had, but would lead the Angelus there on 14 July. In retirement, Benedict used it at Francis's invitation for a two-week vacation in 2015.

On 7 December 2013, Pope Francis named Osvaldo Gianoli as the Director of the Pontifical Villas of Castel Gandolfo. In March 2014, the Vatican opened the Barberini Gardens to paid visitors on escorted tours during morning hours every day but Sunday. Beginning 11 September 2015, the public was able to travel from Vatican City to Castel Gandolfo by a train that had previously been reserved for use by the pope. Before the end of the year, products from the farm, previously only available to Vatican employees, were made available for purchase by the public.

On 21 October 2016, the palace was opened to the public for viewing without undergoing any structural changes. When asked if the building would again become a papal apartment, Castel Gandolfo mayor Milvia Monachesi said: "the fact that the palace is now a museum will make a reversal in the future difficult".

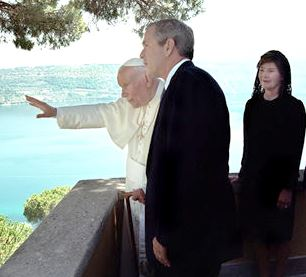
Pope John Paul II with US President George W. Bush and his wife Laura during their first meeting at the Papal Palace of Castel Gandolfo in July 2001.

On 17 June 2025, a communiqué of the Prefecture of the Pontifical Household was issued which restored the palace to its status as a place of papal residency. The communiqué stated that Pope Leo XIV planned to take up residence in the Palace for part of his summer holidays from 6 to 20 July and from 15 to 17 August of that year. On July 6, 2025, Pope Leo XIV would begin staying at Castel Gandolfo for a six week vacation, thus resuming the tradition of Castel Gandolfo being used as the pope's retreat and summer home. However, the main Apostolic Palace at Castel Gandolfo still remained a museum, with Leo XIV instead staying at the Castel Gandolfo complex's Villa Barberini. He stays at Castel Gandolfo once a week as part of his work and life routine.

Starting in May 2026, the Papal Palace of Castel Gandolfo had minor renovations. Due to the security issues of Villa Barberini, the official Papal Palace will be re-converted back into the pope's summer residence, making it habitable again for Pope Leo XIV to officially move in during July 2026. Pope Leo XIV will become the 16th pope to spend the summer at the official summer residence of the pontiffs. Starting in July 5, Pope Leo will be staying until July 27 at the Apostolic Palace in Castel Gandolfo, which is now once again serving as a papal summer residence after having been converted into a museum by Pope Francis.

== Legal status ==
Pursuant to the Lateran Treaty of 1929, the Papal Palace of Castel Gandolfo is Italian territory, but owned by the Holy See and equipped with extraterritoriality comparable to that of diplomatic missions. It is exempt from Italian taxes and expropriations, and Italian authorities are prohibited from entering it without the consent of the Holy See.

== See also ==
- 17th century in architecture
- List of palaces in Italy
