= Tshego Gaelae =

South African beauty queen, Mrs. World 2025 winner

- Born: Tshegofatso Ngoasheng; 4 June 1990 (age 36); Soweto, Gauteng, South Africa
- Education: University of Johannesburg
- Occupations: Attorney; Model; beauty pageant titleholder
- Spouse: Tshepo Leatile Gaelae (m. 2019)
- Beauty pageant titleholder
- Hair colour: Black
- Eye colour: Brown
- Major competitions: Mrs. South Africa 2024 (winner); Mrs. World 2024; (winner)

Tshego Gaelae (née Ngoasheng) is a South African attorney, model, and beauty pageant titleholder who was crowned Mrs. World 2024. Gaelae had previously been crowned Mrs. South Africa 2024. She is the second woman from South Africa and the first black woman to win the Mrs. World title.

== Personal life ==
She married Tshepo Leatile Gaelae in 2019. The couple have a son together, Boikanyo (born 27 January 2020).

She studied her LLB at the University of Johannesburg. She run's a NGO called We Are Our Children’s Keeper which provides school shoes and uniforms to underprivileged children.

== Pageantry ==
=== Mrs. South Africa 2024 ===
She was crowned the winner by her predecessor Palesa Matjekane on Friday, 17 November 2023 at the Theatre of Marcellus in Emperors Palace beating runner-up Pearl Nikolic from Pretoria and second runner-up Noeline Rajbally from Durban to the crown.

Following her win, Gaelae received prizes including a new car courtesy of Chery Krugersdorp, travel packages, luxury home appliances, clothing, and business and public relations services, for her to use throughout her reign. The achievement allowed Gaelae to represent South Africa at the Mrs. World 2025 competition.

Gaelae crowned her successor, Erin-Jane Miller, on 15 November 2024.

=== Mrs. World 2024 ===
Gaelae was crowned Mrs. World 2024 in Las Vegas, USA on Friday, 31 January 2025 with Ishadi Amanda of Sri Lanka as the first runner-up and Ploy Panperm of Thailand as the second runner-up.

Gaelae crowned her successor, Chanita Seedaket Craythorne of Thailand, on 29 January 2026.
