= Sargam Koushal =

Indian teacher, pageant titleholder (born 1990)

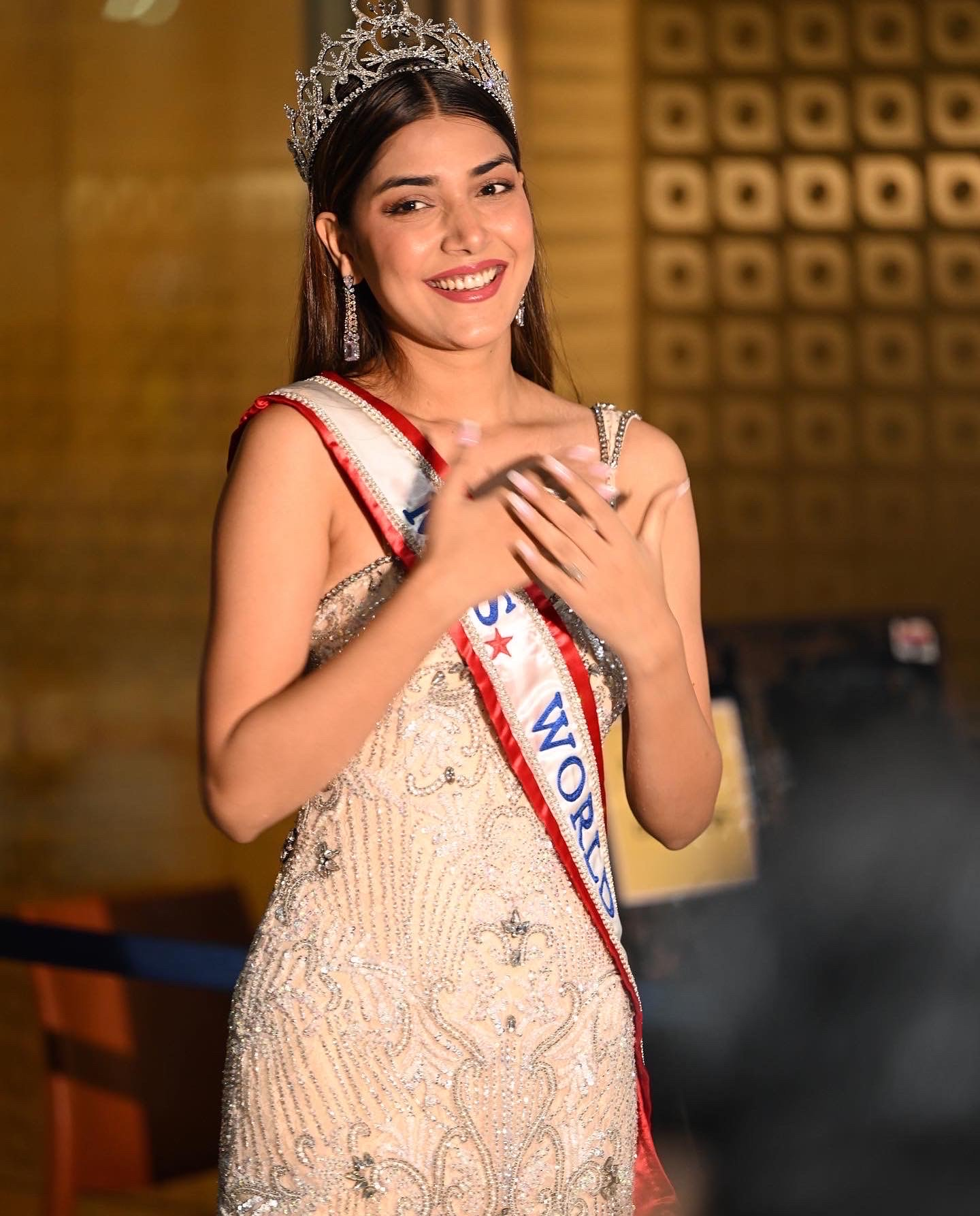
- Mrs. World 2022 Sargam Koushal
- Born: 20 September 1990 (age 35); Jammu, Jammu and Kashmir, India
- Education: University of Jammu
- Occupation: Teacher
- Spouse: Aditya Manohar Sharma (m. 2017)
- Beauty pageant titleholder
- Title: Mrs. India Inc (2022); Mrs. World (2022)

Sargam Koushal (born 20 September 1990) is an Indian teacher who won the title of Mrs. World in 2022.

== Personal life ==
Sargam Koushal was born on 20 September 1990 to GS Kaushal and Meena Kaushal in Jammu and Kashmir. Her father is a retired chief manager at Bank of India.

She completed her schooling at Saint Marry's Presentation Convent Senior Secondary School of Gandhi Nagar Jammu, graduated from Women's College, Jammu, and earned a master's degree in English literature from the University of Jammu. She also has a B.Ed. degree from Government B.Ed. College Jammu. She married Aditya Manohar Sharma on 3 December 2017 who is an officer in the Indian Navy. She worked as teacher in Visakhapatnam. After her marriage, she chose and found her passion to compete in beauty pageants.

== Career ==
During her reign as Mrs. World 2022, Sargam Koushal became the most travelled winner in the pageant's history, visiting 10 countries including Russia, Thailand, and South Africa. This extensive travel, exceeding 75,420 miles, included crowning national Mrs. World representatives, participating in brand promotions, and community events.

In November 2023, Sargam Koushal visited South Africa to judge the Mrs South Africa pageant.

== Competition ==
Sargam won the title of Mrs India in June 2022 at the pageant held by Mrs. India Inc. In 2022 Mrs. World competition, she beat 63 contestants from different countries. The competition was held in Las Vegas, Nevada. Shaylyn Ford, 2021 Mrs. World presented crown to her. In the final competition she wore pink gown and accessories like beautiful crystal earrings. Her costume was designed by Bhawna Rao.
