= Greenpeace Southeast Asia =

Regional Greenpeace office, based in Thailand

- Founded: 2000, Bangkok, Thailand
- Type: Non-governmental organization
- Purpose: Environmentalism, peace
- Region served: Thailand, Philippines, Indonesia, Malaysia
- Method: Direct action, lobbying, research, innovation
- Key people: Yeb Sano, Executive Director
- Website: www.greenpeace.org/southeastasia/

Greenpeace Southeast Asia is the regional office of the global environmental organization Greenpeace.

Greenpeace has run successful campaigns in the Philippines, Taiwan, India, Indonesia and Thailand, often working with other local environmental groups. In late 1980s and early 1990s, Greenpeace has developed its presence, and first established an office in Japan in 1989 and then China in 1997. Because of the region's vital importance, initial investigations were also initiated focusing primarily on Philippines and Indonesia.

Greenpeace has thoroughly campaigned in industrialized countries to reduce and eventually eliminate environmental pollution and degradation knowing that those efforts can easily be reversed as some multinational companies export dirty technologies resulting in environmental destruction in the region. In 1999, Greenpeace led the campaign to push for the passage of Republic Act No. 8749, otherwise known as "The Philippine Clean Air Act", which includes an unprecedented national ban against waste incineration. In recognition of the region's vital importance, Greenpeace Southeast Asia was formally established in March 2000 with its head office in Bangkok, Thailand and branch offices in Manila, Philippines and Jakarta, Indonesia—major cities in the region that are among the most polluted cities in the world today.

Greenpeace Southeast Asia is rooted within the local environmental communities around the countries where it operates. Licensed to use the name "Greenpeace" by Stichting Greenpeace Council, Greenpeace Southeast Asia contributes financially to Greenpeace International, campaign locally, participate in international campaigns, and help shape the international campaign program.

Greenpeace Southeast Asia's work in the region includes stopping hazardous waste imports, opposing radioactive shipments, campaigning against forest destruction, lobbying governments on sustainable energy issues and drawing attention to the dangers of waste incineration. It uses tactics of non-violent direct action to draw attention to what it considers significant threats to the environment, and then forces solutions.

In 2005 the Rainbow Warrior II ran aground on and damaged the Tubbataha Reef in the Philippines while inspecting the reef for coral bleaching. Greenpeace was fined US$7,000 for damaging the reef and agreed to pay the fine saying they felt responsible for the damage, although Greenpeace stated that the Philippines government had given it outdated charts. The park manager of Tubbatha appreciated the quick action Greenpeace took to assess the damage to the reef.

As a regional organization, Greenpeace Southeast Asia focuses on bearing witness to the impacts brought by global warming, and increasing public awareness of the problems it poses. Campaigning to effect changes in the direction of the region's energy policies for the future, the group encourages governments to turn away from fossil fuel dependency and embracing renewable, sustainable and clean sources of energy.

== Criticism ==
In 2016, over a hundred Nobel Prize winners signed an open letter calling on Greenpeace to end its campaign against genetically modified organisms in general and golden rice in particular; a spokeswoman for the organisation rejected the accusation of obstructing golden rice and called it a "failed solution" and "something that doesn't exist at all", in turn accusing corporations of seeking to pave the way for more profitable GM crops.

On 17 April 2024, the Court of Appeals in the Philippines issued a cease-and-desist order on the commercial propagation of two genetically modified crops, golden rice and Bt eggplant, citing a lack of "full scientific certainty" regarding their health and environmental impact. The decision was in response to a petition filed by groups including Magsasaka at Siyentipiko para sa Pag-unlad Agrikultura (Masipag) and Greenpeace Southeast Asia. The court revoked the biosafety permits previously granted by the government to the University of the Philippines Los Baños (UPLB) and the Philippine Rice Research Institute (PhilRice). This decision was criticized for putting the lives of thousands of children at risk.

== See also ==
- Greenpeace China
- Greenpeace Aotearoa New Zealand
- Von Hernandez
