= Heroes of the Environment =

Topic of Time Magazine special issue

Heroes of the Environment was an annual list of notable environmentalists chosen and compiled by Time magazine.

The list appeared for three years from 2007 to 2009.

- Heroes of the Environment (2007).
- Heroes of the Environment (2008).
- Heroes of the Environment (2009).

== See also ==
- Environmental awards
- Environmentalists
- Sustainability advocates
- Champions of the Earth
- List of environmental awards
