= Mrs. Globe =

Beauty contest

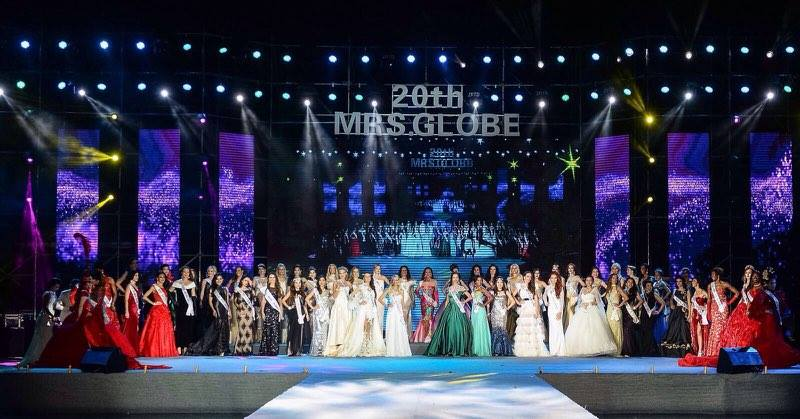
- The 20th anniversary Mrs Globe pageant 2016
- Formation: 1996; 30 years ago
- Type: Beauty pageant
- Headquarters: United States
- Official language: English
- Website: mrsglobe.com

Mrs. Globe is an annual international beauty pageant open to women who are over 25, married, or who are parents. The pageant is heavily involved with charity work with funds going to women in need. Over 70 countries have had representatives in the pageant. Ksenia Krivko was crowned Mrs. Globe 2020 at the international contest on December 7 in Shenzhen, China.

== Titleholders ==
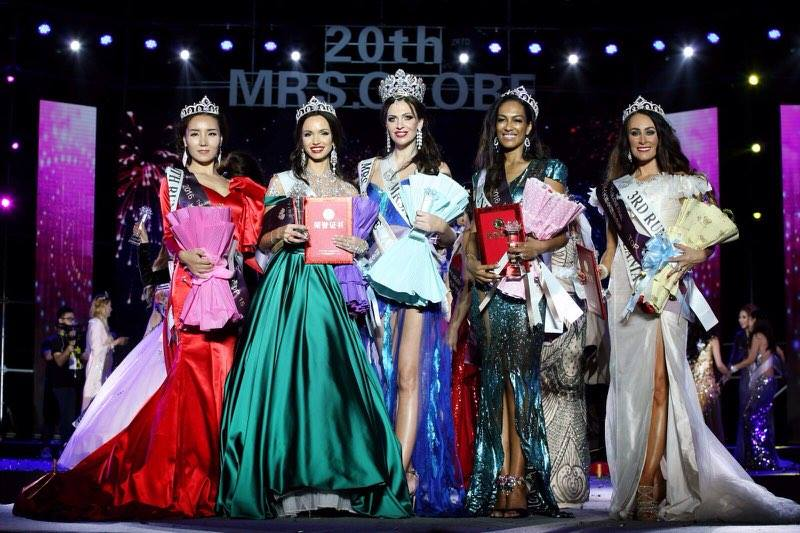
Top five finalists in Hainan, China

Year	Country/Continent/Region	Mrs. Globe	Location	Entrants
2026	Spain	Iryna Zhemchuhova	Palm Springs, California	80
2025	India	Anurahda Garg	Shenzhen, China	80
2024	Europe	Maryna Kamaeva	Hainan, China	80
2023	Europe	Lana Hlumakova	Palm Springs, United States	28
2022	Thailand	Maynus Sorrayutsenee	Palm Springs, United States	65
2020	Russia	Ksenia Krivko	Shenzhen, China	102
2019	Tatarstan	Alisa Tulynina	Shenzhen, China	65
2018	Lithuania	Tatyana Lavrinovič	Shenzhen, China	64
2017	Belarus	Svetlana Kuznetsova	Hainan, China	64
2016	Lebanon	Sylvia Yammine	Shenzhen, China	60
2015	South Africa	Riana Mooi	Shenzhen, China	62
2014	China	Yi Quin	Shenzhen, China	40
2013	Netherlands	Sheryl Lynn Baas	Palm Springs, United States	40
2012	Ukraine	Anna Shchapova	40	
2011	Russia	Alisa Krylova	Yakutia, Russia	40
2010	Armenia	Gohar Harutyunyan	Bratislava, Slovakia	40
2008	Ukraine	Iryna Chernomaz	Palm Springs, United States	40
2007	Belgium	Daisy Van Cawenbergh	Palm Springs, United States	36
2006	Greece	Mada Papadakos	Palm Springs, United States	36
2005	Venezuela	Rosa Terenzio	Palm Springs, United States	36
2004	Bulgaria	Rumyana Marinova	Palm Springs, United States	36
2003	Greece	Lila Karakitsakis	Palm Springs, United States	36
2002	Spain	Dolores Couceiro	Newport Beach, United States	36
2001	United States	Stacey Cooper	Newport Beach, United States	36
2000	Lebanon	Claude Attie	Newport Beach, United States	36
1999	Albania	Valbona Selimllari	Newport Beach, United States	36
1998	Latvia	Ieva Bondare	Newport Beach, United States	36
1997	Greece	Anthy Priovolous	Newport Beach, United States	36
1996	United States	Tracy Kemble	Newport Beach, United States	36

=== Countries and territories by number of wins ===
Country	Titles	Year(s)
Greece	3	1997, 2003, 2006
Russia	2	2011, 2020
Lebanon	2	2000, 2016
Ukraine	2	2008, 2012
United States	2	1996, 2001
Europe	1	2023
Thailand	1	2022
Tatarstan	1	2019
Lithuania	1	2018
Belarus	1	2017
South Africa	1	2015
China	1	2014
Netherlands	1	2013
Armenia	1	2010
Belgium	1	2007
Venezuela	1	2005
Bulgaria	1	2004
Spain	1	2002
Albania	1	1999
Latvia	1	1998

== See also ==
- List of beauty contests
