= Mrs. World =

International beauty pageant

- Formation: 1984; 42 years ago
- Headquarters: La Quinta
- Location: United States
- Official language: English
- Website: mrsworld.com

Mrs. World is the first beauty pageant for married women, conceived in 1984. The concept of the pageant itself has its roots in Mrs. America. From 1984 to 1987, the pageant was known as Mrs. Woman of the World and was changed to Mrs. World in 1988. The contest is the biggest marital pageant in the world.

The reigning Mrs. World is Chanita Seedaket Craythorne from Thailand who was crowned in January 2026 in Las Vegas, United States.

== Titleholders ==
The following is the list of winners since the competition’s inception in 1984. No contest was held in 1985, 1990 to 1994, 1996 to 1998, 2004, 2010, 2012, and 2015.

Year	Country/Territory	Mrs. World	Venue of Competition	Entrants
2025	Thailand	Chanita Seedaket Craythorne	Las Vegas, Nevada, United States	47
2024	South Africa	Tshego Gaelae	Las Vegas, Nevada, United States	40
2023	Germany	Julia Schnelle	Las Vegas, Nevada, United States	38
2022	India	Sargam Koushal	Las Vegas, Nevada, United States	64
2021	United States	Shaylyn Ford	Las Vegas, Nevada, United States	58
2020	Ireland	Kate Schneider (Assumed)	Las Vegas, Nevada, United States	51
2020	Sri Lanka	Caroline Jurie	Las Vegas, Nevada, United States	51
2019	Vietnam	Jennifer Lê	Las Vegas, Nevada, United States	35
2018	Hong Kong	Alice Lee Giannetta	Johannesburg, South Africa	35
2017	Peru	Guiliana Miryam Zevallos	Incheon, South Korea	36
2016	South Africa	Candice Abrahams	Dongguan, Guangdong, China	46
2015	Belarus	Marina Alekseichik	Lusby, Maryland, United States	35
2013	United States	Kaley Sparling	Guangzhou, Guangdong, China	39
2011	United States	April Lufriu	Orlando, Florida, United States	56
2009	Russia	Victoria Radochinskaya	Vũng Tàu, Vietnam	78
2008	Ukraine	Natalia Shmarenkova	Kaliningrad, Russia	42
2007	United States	Diane Tucker	Sochi, Russia	30
2006	Russia	Sofia Arzhakovskaya	Saint Petersburg, Russia	34
2005	Israel	Sima Bakahr	Aamby Valley City, India	41
2004	Thailand	Suzanna Vichinrut	Las Vegas, Nevada, United States	38
2002	United States	Nicole Brink	Las Vegas, Nevada, United States	38
2001	India	Aditi Govitrikar	Las Vegas, Nevada, United States	35
2000	United States	Starla Stanley	Honolulu, Hawaii, United States	35
1995	Costa Rica	Marisol Soto de Volio	San José, Costa Rica	32
1989	Peru	Lucila Boggiano	Las Vegas, Nevada, United States	39
1988	United States	Pamela Nail	Honolulu, Hawaii, United States	33
1987	New Zealand	Barbara Riley	San José, Costa Rica	40
1986	Colombia	Astrid de Navia	Honolulu, Hawaii, United States	32
1984	Sri Lanka	Rosy Senanayake	Brisbane, Queensland, Australia	32

=== Countries by number of wins ===
Country	Titles	Year(s)
United States	7	1988, 2000, 2002, 2007, 2011, 2013, 2021
Thailand	2	2004, 2025
India	2	2001, 2022
Peru	2	1989, 2017
South Africa	2	2016, 2024
Sri Lanka	2	1984, 2020
Russia	2	2006, 2009
Thailand	2	2004, 2025
Belarus	1	2015
Colombia	1	1986
Costa Rica	1	1995
Germany	1	2023
Hong Kong	1	2018
Ireland	1	2020
Israel	1	2005
New Zealand	1	1987
Ukraine	1	2008
Vietnam	1	2019

== Controversies ==
=== Sri Lanka Pageant Assault ===
In April 2021, Caroline Jurie, then-reigning 2020 Mrs. World winner and former Mrs. Sri Lanka World, was the subject of controversy after she took the crown off from the head of 2021 Mrs. Sri Lanka World winner Pushpika De Silva, announcing that the winner should be married but not divorced.

Shortly after, the Mrs. World organization announced that Kate Schneider from Ireland, who was the first runner up when Jurie won the title, was named Mrs. World 2020 following the voluntary resignation of Jurie. Jurie remained as a former Mrs. World and was listed in the official booklet of Mrs World 2022.

Pushpika De Silva was officially stripped of her title on 8 February 2022 on grounds of 'serious violation of the discipline and the ethical standards expected of a beauty queen.

=== Syrian Refugee Denied Visa ===
Mrs. UK World 2021, Leen Clive, was due to travel to Las Vegas for the Mrs. World 2021 pageant. However, she was denied entry into the United States, believed to be due to her Syrian birth, although she had been living in the UK since 2013. Her participation was instead moved to the next pageant set for the end of 2022.

== See also ==
- List of beauty contests
- Mrs. America
