= Convent of Santa Maria ad Nives, Palazzolo =

Convent in Rocca di Papa, Italy

Convent of Santa Maria ad Nives of Palazzolo
- Convento di Santa Maria ad Nives di Palazzolo
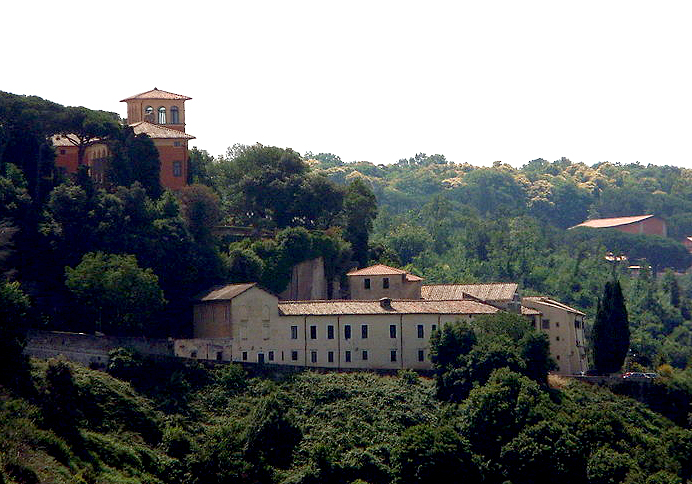
- Panorama of the convent and the Cardinal's villa.

- 41.743592°N 12.689696°E
- Location: Rocca di Papa, Province of Rome, Italy
- Denomination: Catholic
- Website: http://www.palazzola.it/

History
- Dedication: St Mary of the Snows
- Consecrated: 12th century

Architecture
- Style: Gothic architecture, Baroque architecture
- Completed: 1739
- Demolished: 1398

Administration
- Diocese: Diocese of Frascati

The church of Santa Maria ad Nives of Palazzolo (also called of Palazzola) is a Catholic place of worship located in the municipality of Rocca di Papa, in the province of Rome, in the suburbicarian diocese of Frascati. Next to the church stands the former convent of the Friars Minor Observant.

The convent, which already existed in the 11th century, stands in a picturesque place overlooking Lake Albano: amidst alternate events it reached its period of maximum splendor around the middle of the 18th century, with the architectural interventions promoted by Bishop José Maria Ribeiro da Fonseca de Évora. The convent was a protectorate of the Kingdom of Portugal from 1870 to 1910, until it was handed over to private individuals in 1915. Since 1920 it has hosted a summer stay for seminarians from the Venerable English College.

== History ==
The origins of the name

The toponym "Palazzolo" or "Palazzola" (the latter more recent) is related to the suggestive belief birthed in the mind of some medieval men that the remains of the rock mausoleum of a Roman consul located on the rock face near the convent had belonged to a consular palace located along the via Sacra that led from the via Appia Antica near Ariccia to the top of Monte Cavo, site of the temple of the Latian Jupiter.

Alternatively, the medieval designations "de Palazzo", "Palatiolis" and "Palatiolus" would refer to the existence of a suburban Roman villa on the site of the present convent.

=== Ancient age ===
The Alban Hills were subject between about 600,000 and 20,000 years ago to the volcanic activity of the Latian Volcano, which generated the present environmental setting in which the convent is located: at the foot of Monte Cavo (949 m a.s.l.), an ancient secondary volcanic crater of the Latian Volcano, overlooks Lake Albano, a volcanic lake that fills what was also a volcanic crater.

Most likely this was the site of the legendary city of Alba Longa, which according to the account of Dionysius of Halicarnassus was founded by Aeneas's son Ascanius thirty years after the founding of Lavinium, "near a mountain and a lake, occupying the space between the two." This description given by the respected historiographer has led many scholars to suspect that the site of the ancient city was located on the southern side of the lake, between the Colle dei Cappuccini in the municipality of Albano Laziale and the Palazzolo convent: although other influential scholars have opted for other sites, such as the eastern side of Lake Albano included between the localities of Costa Caselle near Marino and Pozzo Carpino in the municipality of Grottaferrata, or the western side of the lake, at the site of the present-day historic center of Castel Gandolfo, currently the most probable hypothesis appears to be the former, so much so that on the Map of Italy drawn up by the Military Geographical Institute the toponym of Alba Longa is placed side by side with that of Palazzolo.

Following the destruction of Alba, conventionally dated to 673 B.C. and in any case datable to the 6th century B.C., the Alban Hills did not lose a character of sacredness linked to the origins of Rome: the "Via Sacra" passed through Palazzolo, which reached the temple of Latian Jupiter located on the summit of Monte Cavo, connecting with the Via Appia Antica near present-day Ariccia. Along this road is a characteristic rock tomb dug into the peperino for about 40 meters wide. The inner cell is 2.60 meters by 2.26 meters large, and the bas-reliefs depict a triumph: the fasces depicted here were used by archaeologist Giacomo Boni as a model for the fasces used as a symbol by the National Fascist Party. The attribution of the tomb is uncertain, however there are those who thought it might have belonged to someone of the Cornelii Scipiones.

=== From the early Middle Ages to the 14th century ===
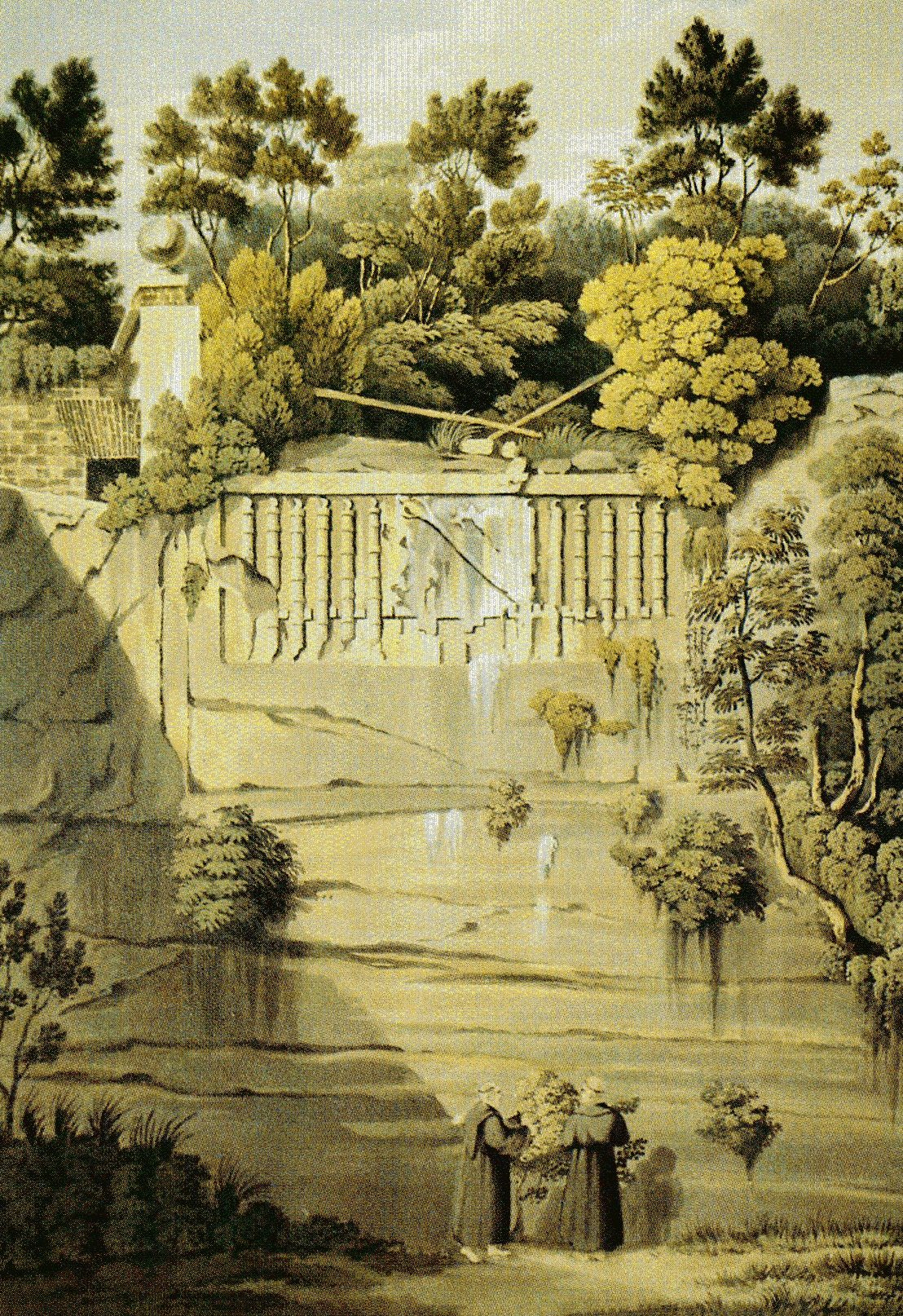
The Palazzolo rock tomb in a lithograph by J. J. Middleton (1812).

The first mention regarding the existence of some sort of hermitage in Palazzolo is said to date from 1050, or at the latest from 1109. At the time of Pope Innocent III (1198-1216) the church belonged to the Cluniac monks of the basilica of San Saba in Rome, and only in 1204 it was granted to a community of hermits. Pope Honorius III in 1220 forced this community to join the Order of St. Augustine, in order to avoid the excessive multiplication of religious orders often bordering on heresy.

Finally, Pope Gregory IX with the papal bull of August 13, 1237 decreed the union of the hermits of Palazzolo with the Cistercian monks of the Abbey of the Three Fountains in Rome: Cardinal Stefano de' Normanni, a relative of the feudal lady of Marino Jacoba of Settesoli, had also committed himself to this. The Cistercian monks, in view of the poor geographical and climatic position in which the Tre Fontane abbey was located, situated in the middle of a malarial valley along the via Laurentina, obtained since 1225 the possibility of moving in the summer to their more salubrious fief of Nemi (a Cistercian possession since 1153) and to the Palazzolo convent.

The importance of the convent grew, as evidenced by the restoration work carried out from 1237 to 1244, to such an extent that it was recognized as an independent abbey from the Abbey of the Three Fountains by the papal bull of January 19, 1244 by Pope Innocent IV: by 1269 the abbey's land holdings extended to the entire southern side of Lake Albano and some land in Marino, Albano Laziale and Tivoli.

By 1310, however, the religious of Palazzolo were so deeply in debt that they had to sell the land located in Albano territory to the Augustinian nuns of the sanctuary of Santa Maria della Rotonda in Albano: in fact, in the preceding years the abbey's economic management had been very bad, to the point that they had to sell the sacred furnishings and liturgical vestments to meet the huge debts they had accumulated. During the period of the Avignon Papacy (1309-1377), the abbey declined and was established as a commenda until Pope Boniface IX by a bull of October 21, 1391 united the convent now abandoned by the monks, scandalized by the conduct of their commendatory abbot Tommaso Pierleoni, to the abbey of Santa Croce in Gerusalemme in Rome, governed by Carthusian monks. The Carthusians also used Palazzolo as a summer resort.

=== From the 15th to the 18th century ===
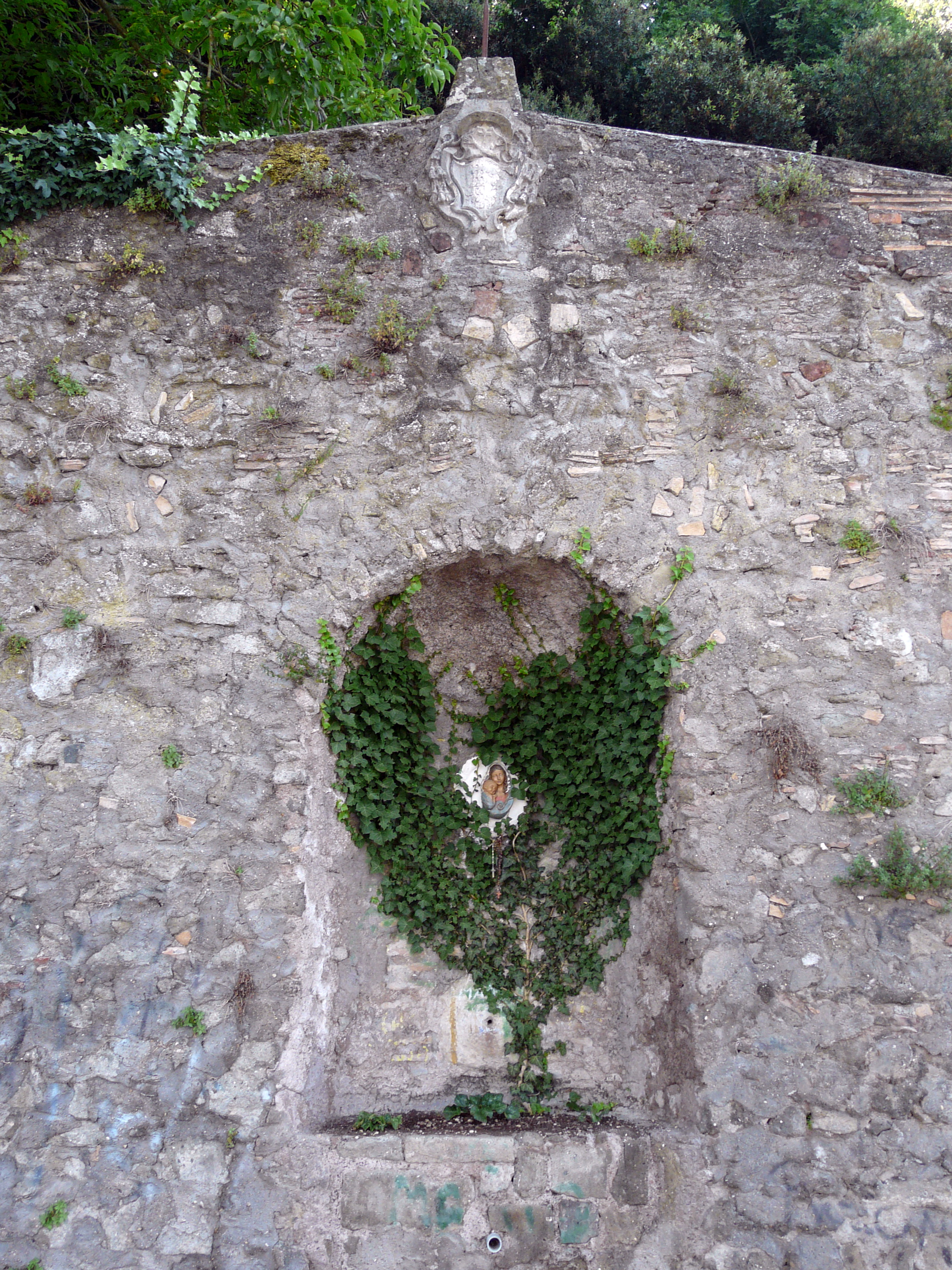
The niche in the forecourt, made around 1662 on the commission of Pope Alexander VII: note the Chigi coat of arms at the top.

The Carthusians donated the convent with all its appurtenances to the Observant Friars Minor in 1449, reserving for themselves, however, the right of summer vacation and ownership of the chestnut grove and vineyard. This co-ownership soon caused some problems, which were resolved by Pope Innocent VIII in a bull of March 23, 1489: although the Carthusians were right, the ownership of the convent remained with the Observant Friars Minor (probably by usucaption).

The Observant Friars Minor thus inhabited the convent throughout the sixteenth century, and in 1626 ceded it to the Friars Minor Conventual, although they regained it in 1640. Meanwhile, Pope Urban VIII with an apostolic approval of August 7, 1629 granted Cardinal Girolamo Colonna a piece of land above the convent, where he had the so-called "villa of the Cardinal" built, probably designed by architect Antonio Del Grande, who had been engaged for the Colonna family in the construction sites of Palazzo Colonna in Rome, the basilica of San Barnaba in Marino, the church of Santa Maria Assunta in Rocca di Papa and the "villa of the Sirena" in Frattocchie.

Pope Alexander VII in 1662 wanted the reconstruction of the road from Castel Gandolfo to Palazzolo by skirting the crater of Lake Albano to the south, then called "via Alessandrina." The design of the road was entrusted to the Observant Friar Minor Giorgio Marziale: this architect was already Gian Lorenzo Bernini's helper as director of works at the buildings commissioned by Alexander VII in the Roman Castles (the pontifical collegiate church of San Tommaso da Villanova in Castel Gandolfo, the collegiate church of Santa Maria Assunta and the sanctuary of Santa Maria di Galloro in Ariccia). Scenic lay-bys with peperino seats were included in the project, as well as numerous interventions at the Palazzolo convent and church, including the niche in the forecourt.

Major restoration work was begun at the convent and church in 1735, at the initiative of Portuguese Cardinal Josè Maria de Fonseca de Evora, who wanted to make Palazzolo the seat of the Portuguese embassy to the Holy See: the work was supervised by architect Gian Domenico Navone, who was also working at the Sforza-Cesarini palace in Genzano di Roma during that same period.

Among the achievements of this period were the roof garden, the hall of San Diego, apartments and rooms sufficient for the reception of "sixty foreigners," the cloister, refectory, and library in addition to the total baroque renovation of the church and sacristy. At the end of the work, in 1738, the total expenses amounted to 79,447 pontifical scudi, expenses that were shouldered by Cardinal de Fonseca.

=== From the 1800s to the 2000s ===
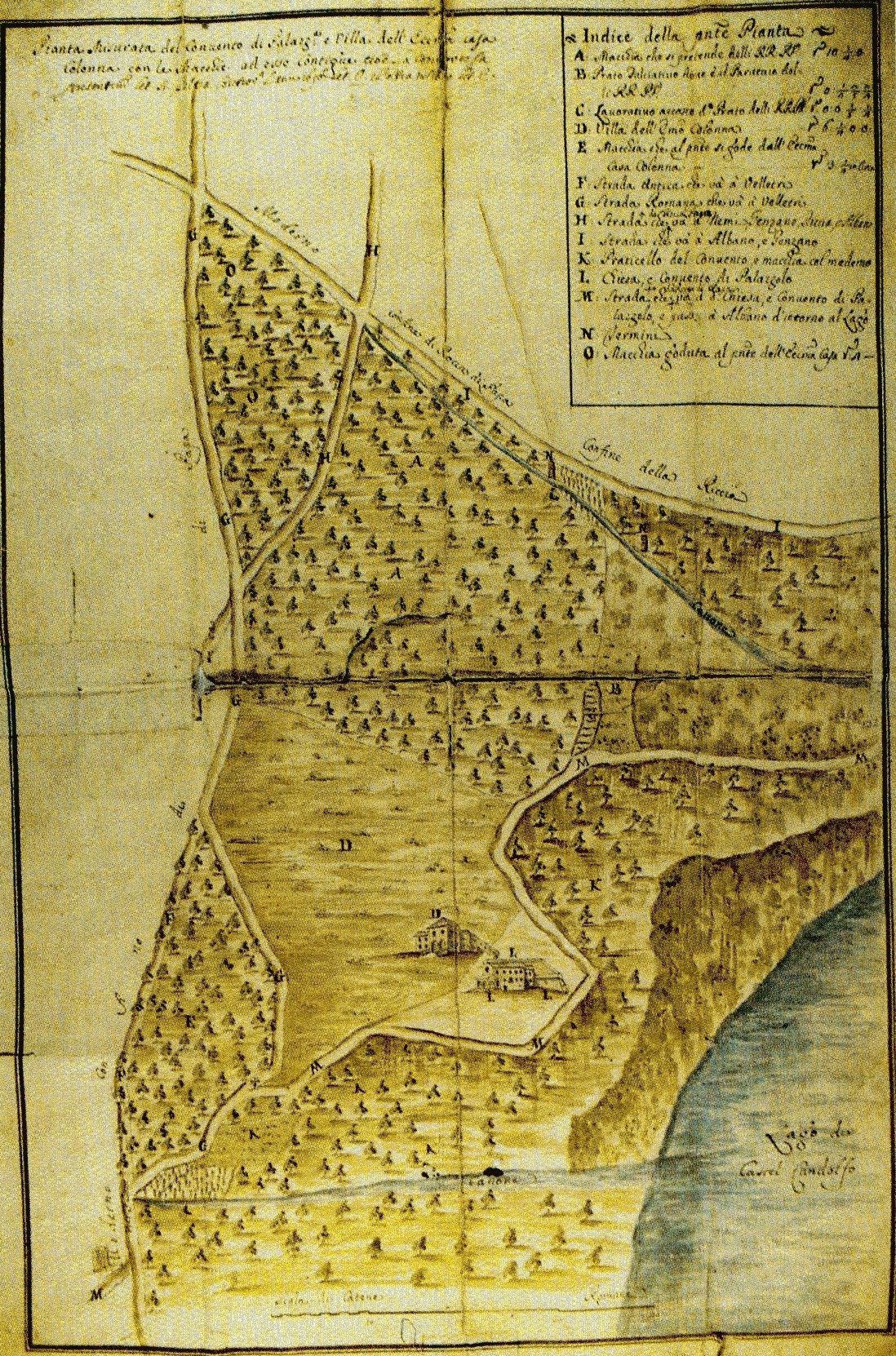
"Measured Plan of the Convent of Palazzola and Villa of the Most Excellent Colonna House with the Shrubs adjoining them," anonymous map from 1727 kept in the central archives of the Friars Minor Observant at the church of San Francesco a Ripa in Rome: the convent, the Cardinal's villa and adjoining properties are noted.

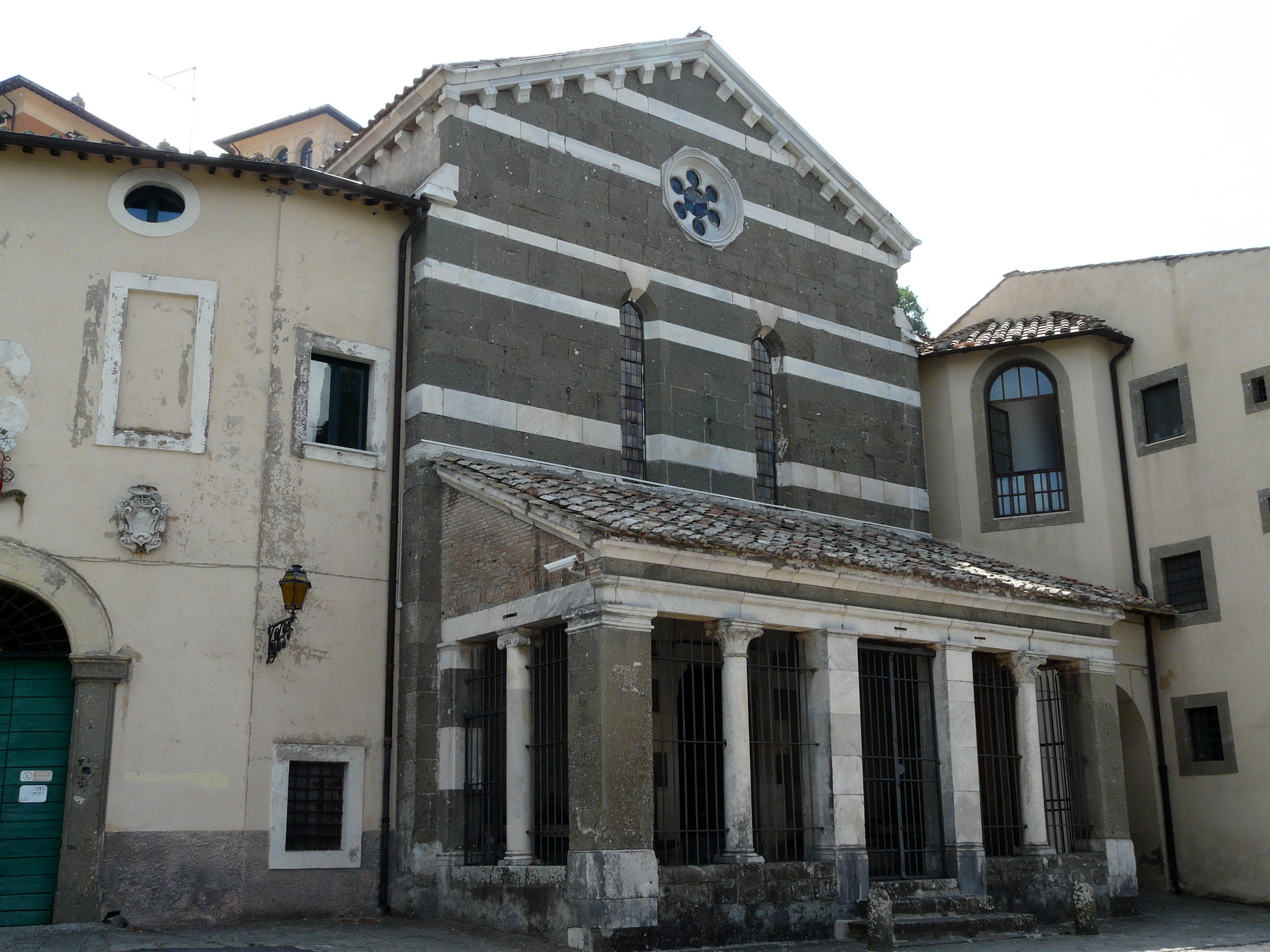
The facade of the church (June 2009).

The convent suffered a first closure during the revolutionary interlude of the Roman Republic (1798-1799), as well as a second, longer one during the period of the Napoleonic occupation of Lazio (1807-1814). In fact, on June 22, 1810, the closure of the convent and the confiscation of all inventoried property was decreed: in the meantime, the State Property provided to sell off much of the convent's furnishings, including the bell tower clock, which was sold off to the Community of Rocca di Papa, the church bells, purchased by the Community of Marino, and above all the valuable eighteenth-century organ, bought for 80 scudi by some Jewish merchants and repurchased by the Community of Genzano di Roma, which placed it in the collegiate church of the Holy Trinity.

The Friars Minor Observant returned to their convent after the Restoration, but after the capture of Rome on September 20, 1870 and the annexation to the Kingdom of Italy they risked going under closure again under the Italian law changing the ecclesiastical property: however, the friars' response to the confiscation decree of June 29, 1873 was an appeal to the Kingdom of Portugal to take the convent under protection, which punctually happened: on June 7, 1880, an agreement was ratified whereby Italy ceded to Portugal the convent and its appurtenances, the caves and the rock mausoleum, in exchange for the convent of Santa Maria in Ara Coeli, which housed the second largest library in Rome, founded by Bishop Fonseca de Évora.

The convent then was used as the residence of the Portuguese ambassador (1896) and as a resort for the students of the Institute of St. Anthony of the Portuguese (1903). With the establishment of the republic in Portugal (October 5, 1910) and the subversion of ecclesiastical property, the friars were permanently driven out of the convent, which was stripped of major works of art before being leased in 1912 to Palermo lawyer Giuseppe Marchesano. It was not until October 14, 1915, that the sale of the convent with its appurtenances and dependencies was ratified for 63,000 Italian liras to Professor Arnaldi, who made a "house of cure and prophylaxis" out of the building. Arnaldi in turn resold it for 260,000 liras on April 6, 1920 to the Venerable English College, which used the premises as a summer residence for the college's students.

Restoration work on the complex began in 1929, with the aim of restoring the church to its original Cistercian appearance by dismantling the 18th-century superstructures: several works of art that had survived the vicissitudes of time were transported to Rome between 1936 and 1937, to the church of Sant'Antonio in Campo Marzio (notably, a Madonna and Child Enthroned by Antoniazzo Romano and the 18th-century portraits of Cardinals Pedro and Josè Maria de Fonseca de Evora). The restorations were completed after World War II.

Beginning in the 1990s there began to be talk of Satanism and black masses allegedly taking place in the caves near the monastic complex and in some luxurious villas in the area: some traces were found in 1994, and the performance of high-priced black masses (even at a price of five million Italian liras) in a villa in the area was revealed in a 1995 article in "Il Messaggero." The phenomenon, restricted to "people with money," was also covered in its time by the "Corriere della Sera," after a number of crime episodes occurred in Frattocchie, Tuscolo, Albano Laziale, Frascati and Nemi.

== Description ==
=== The church ===
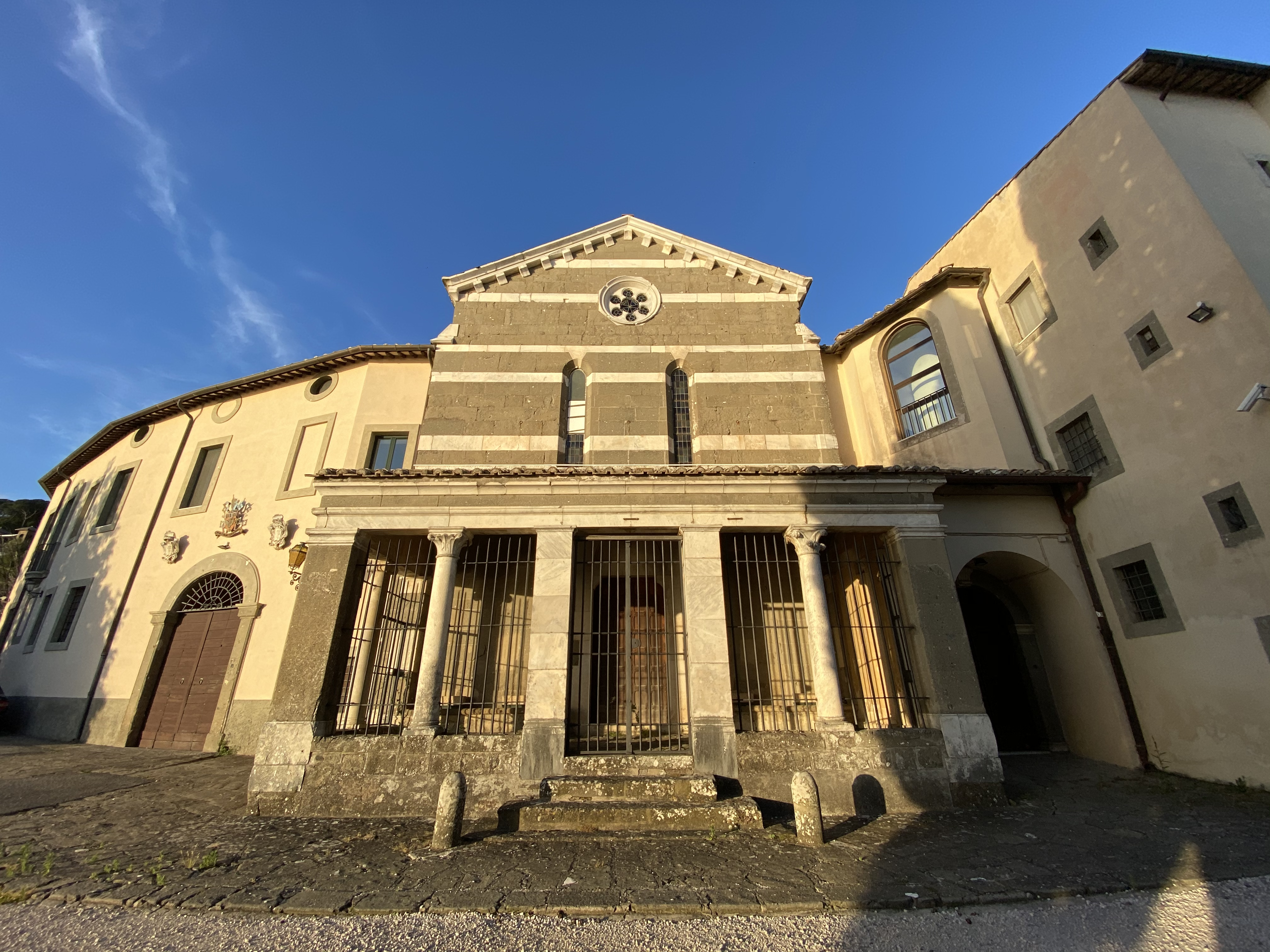
The facade of the church at sunset (June 2020).

==== The entrance portico and facade ====
The entrance portico of the church is made according to Cistercian custom, with ancient columns and bare capitals, in this case all of Ionic order: it is reminiscent of the entrance porticos of the church of San Giorgio in Velabro and the Tre Fontane Abbey in Rome, as it too can be dated to the first half of the 13th century. The portico has five openings, of which the central one represents the entrance. Above the portico, the severe gabled facade is adorned only by a Gothic rose window and two monoforas symmetrically arranged on either side of the main vertical axis.

The appearance of the portico was modified during the interventions commissioned by Cardinal Fonseca in 1735-1738: in fact, two small rooms for the choir loft and organ were built above the portico, an intervention that involved plugging the rose window and the monoforas: in addition, twin bell towers were erected on either side of the portico, one equipped with three bells and the other with the clock. The tops of the bell towers were clad in lead and were adorned with arched spires in the Borrominian style, all of which were looted by the French in 1806 when the bell towers had to be repaired after an earthquake tremor.

The original appearance was only restored to the portico and facade after the twentieth-century restorations, which also added the alternating band articulation of Carrara marble and peperino, unrelated to the original architecture and judged by some experts to be questionable.

==== The nave ====
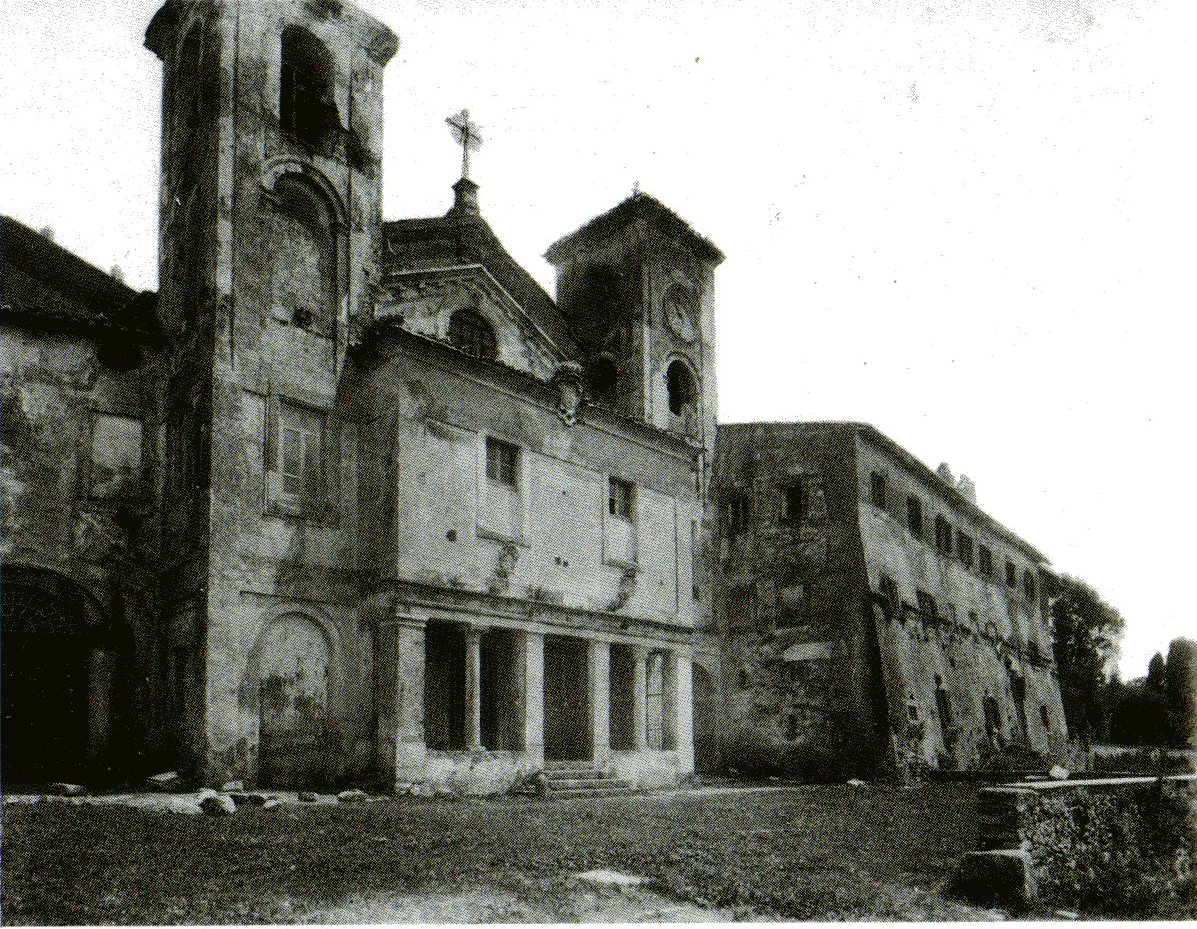
The facade of the church (1915-1919).

The interior of the church consists of a single nave, covered by a cross-ribbed vault, reminiscent of the interior of the Carthusian Monastery of Trisulti: in ancient times there were two side altars, which at the beginning of the 18th century were found to be dedicated to Our Lady and St. James of the Marches, the latter co-founder of the Observant Friars Minor together with St. Bernardine of Siena. Lighting is provided through two large monoforas on the sides.

During the work of 1735-1738 the floor, "with square bricks and marble squares," the plaster, the high altar and the two side altars dedicated one to St. Joseph and the other to the saints Most Holy Anne and Joachim were redone: both were decorated with "pilasters, stucco capitals and gable pediments," framing two paintings by Agostino Masucci. Twentieth-century restorations led to the removal of the side altars and Fonsechian interventions as well as the restoration of the essential Cistercian lines, marked by the alternation of white plaster and gray peperino.

Until the time of the numerous changes of ownership of the complex at the beginning of the twentieth century there existed at the entrance of the church two Carrara marble stoups with the coat of arms of the Colonna family, some eighteenth-century frescoes and a bronze cross belonging to the "holy door" of the basilica of St. John Lateran in Rome, removed and brought to Palazzolo at the behest of Cardinal Girolamo Colonna, who opened the door during the Jubilee of 1675: another similar cross is also preserved in the basilica of St. Barnabas in Marino.

==== The chancel and the choir ====
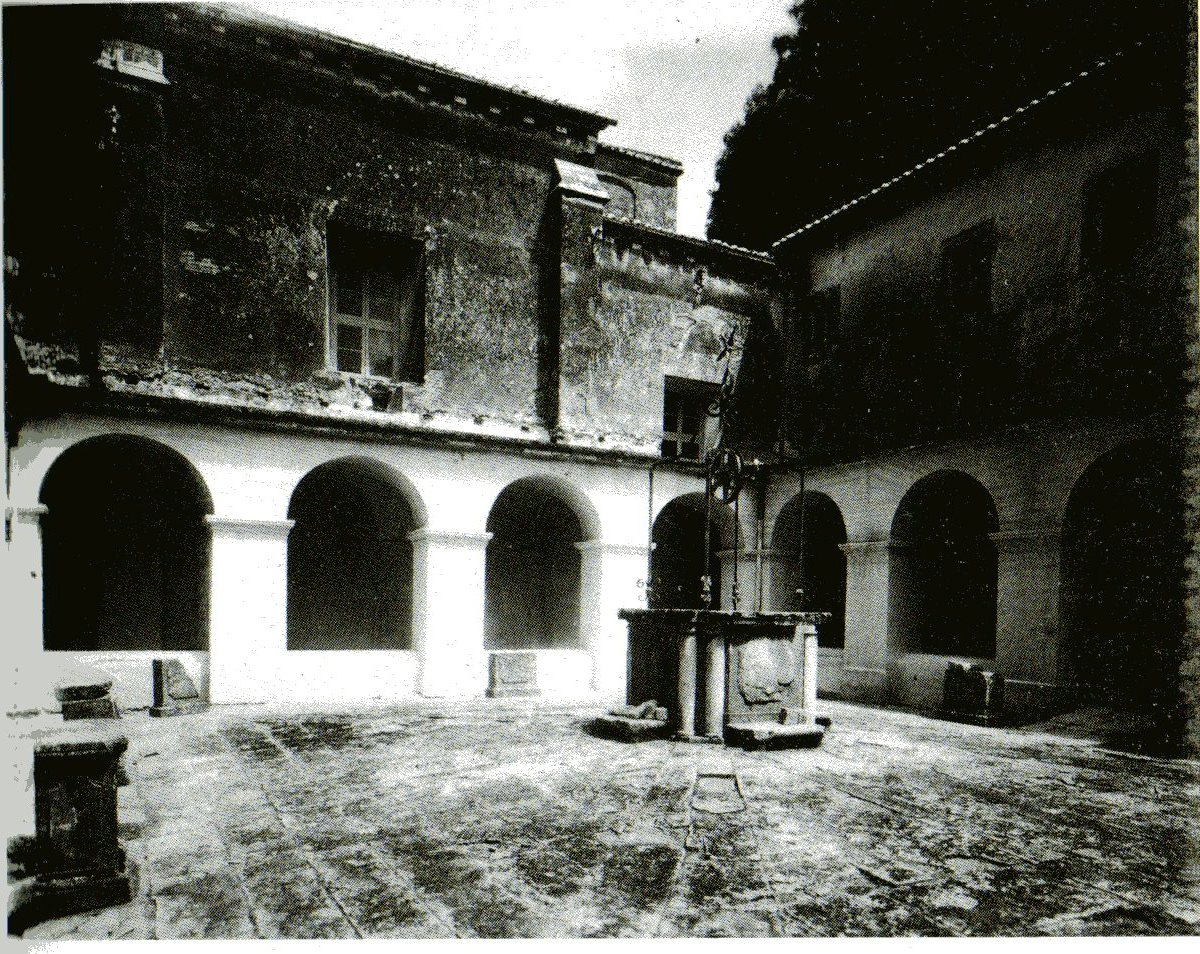
The convent cloister (1915-1919): note the round arches, which replaced the original twin columns in the 18th century.

The chancel was raised two steps above the floor of the nave during eighteenth-century interventions: in the same period, the jambs and tympanum architraves of the two doors opening on both left and right were made, above which were placed two busts depicting St. Francis of Assisi and St. Anthony of Padua. The high altar and ciborium were placed in the center of the chancel, while a second altar was erected behind the back wall above which was placed a panel depicting a Madonna and Child Enthroned attributed to Antoniazzo Romano or his workshop. The panel was framed by a characteristic Baroque stucco frame surrounded by angels' heads.

All this was dismantled by 20th-century restorations, while the Antoniazzo panel was transported to the church of Sant'Antonio in Campo Marzio in Rome. Today the chancel is adorned with a modern polyptych: in the upper part of the back wall, a fresco dated to the 12th or 13th century depicting a Madonna and Child Enthroned between two Pietàs, also of the Antoniazzo school, has been brought to light. The chancel is lit by three monoforas, one on each wall: the side of the altar facing the nave is adorned with a marble lunette depicting the "Mystic Lamb."

In the 16th century, several members of the Colonna family were buried in the choir: in particular, Agnese di Montefeltro, daughter of Federico III da Montefeltro, wife of Fabrizio I Colonna and mother of Vittoria and Ascanio I Colonna, who died in 1523 apparently expressing a wish to be buried in Marino, in the church of San Giovanni, a wish evidently disregarded by her children who wanted her buried together with her eldest son, Federico, who died prematurely at the age of nineteen after an eventful military career.

==== The sacristy and the preparatory room ====
The sacristy is located to the left of the chancel, and consists of two rooms: one is the sacristy proper, the other a preparatory room. The Cistercian origin of the structure is clearly denoted by the girdled cross vaults that cover it: the 18th-century interventions, removed from the rest of the complex during 20th-century restorations, have been preserved in this part.

These rooms once represented the ground floor of the building's original bell tower, which was probably demolished in the eighteenth century with the construction of the twin bell towers adjacent to the entrance portico (now also demolished): this hypothesis was formulated by Alberto Crielesi by observing the "opus quadratum" walling of the rooms. At the beginning of the twentieth century, during the period when the convent was used as a nursing home, the preparatory room was used as a chapel.

=== The convent ===
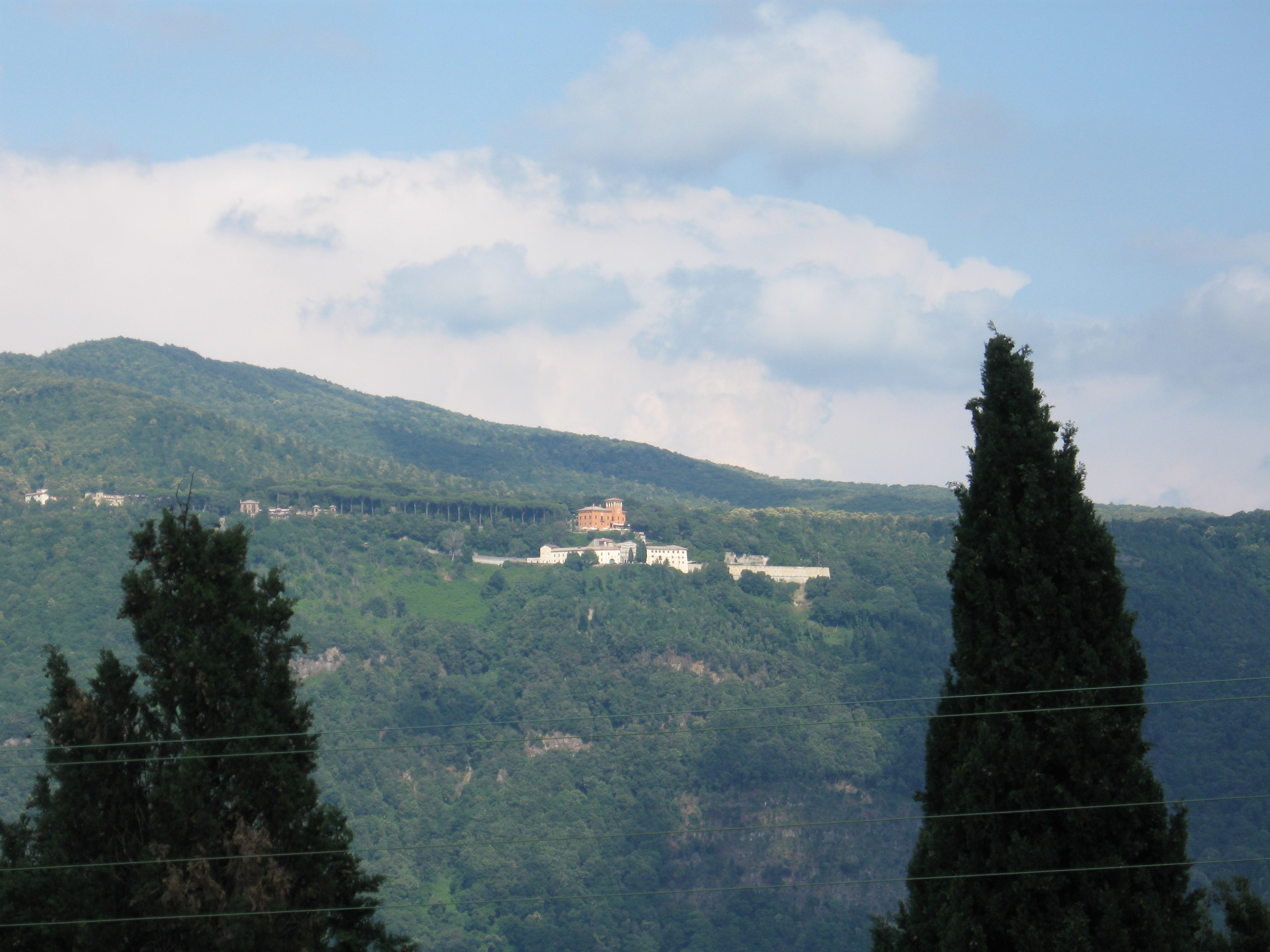
The convent as seen from Castel Gandolfo.

The floor plan and layout of the convent follows that of all Cistercian convents of the time: it is located to the right of the church, and was raised one story to the west (overlooking Lake Albano) probably in the 18th century.

The cloister was originally made of paired columns, but during Fonsecian interventions they were removed and replaced by round arches, an appearance that has remained to this day. The old columns survived in the convent garden until 1810: then they disappeared.

The eighteenth-century interventions consisted of arranging the building so that it could accommodate some sixty foreigners, and of making some "comforts" such as the "billiard room," the refectory equipped with walnut benches and a painting depicting the Wedding at Cana, a small library, a secluded lodge and two apartments of honor, and above all the great hall of St. Didacus of Alcalá, furnished with a large painting of the saint attributed to Agostino Masucci.

Currently, the Venerable English College has equipped the convent with 50 single or double rooms for a total of 65 guests, and still uses the friars' 18th-century refectory. In addition, the complex has been equipped with an outdoor swimming pool.

== See also ==
- Roman Castles
- Rocca di Papa
- Alba Longa
- Albano Laziale

== Bibliography ==
- Ricci, Giovanni Antonio (1787). Memorie storiche dell'antichissima città di Alba Longa e dell'Albano moderno. Rome: Giovanni Zempel. p. 272.
- Lucidi, Emanuele (1796). Memorie storiche dell'antichissimo municipio ora terra dell'Ariccia, e delle sue colonie di Genzano e Nemi. Rome: Tipografia Lazzarini.
- Ratti, Nicola (1797). Storia di Genzano, con note e documenti. Rome: Stamperia Salomoni.
- Nibby, Antonio (1848). Analisi storico-topografico-antiquaria della carta de' dintorni di Roma. Rome: Tipografia delle Belle Arti. p. 546.
- Moroni, Gaetano (1840). Dizionario di erudizione storico-ecclesiastica. Venice: Tipografia Emiliani.
- Torquati, Girolamo (1974). Studi storico-archeologici sulla città e sul territorio di Marino. Marino: Tipografica Renzo Palozzi.
- Tomassetti, Giuseppe; Tomassetti, Francesco (1979) [1910]. La Campagna Romana antica, medioevale e moderna IV. Turin: Olschki. ISBN 8822228812.
- Lugli, Giuseppe (1969). Studi e ricerche su Albano archeologica 1914-1967. Albano Laziale: Comune di Albano Laziale. p. 265.
- Basili, Tito (1971). I Colli Albani. Rome: Azienda Autonoma Turismo Laghi e Castelli Romani.
- Coarelli, Filippo (1981). Guide archeologhe Laterza - Dintorni di Roma. Rome-Bari: Casa editrice Giuseppe Laterza & figli.
- Chiarucci, Pino (1986). Gli insediamenti laziali e quelli albani in particolare in Il Lazio antico dalla protostoria all'età medio-repubblicana, Atti del corso di archeologia tenutosi presso il Museo Civico di Albano nel 1982-1983. Rome: Paleani Editrice.
- Del Nero, Raimondo (1990). La Valle Latina. Frascati: Parco regionale dei Castelli Romani.
- Crielesi, Alberto (1997). Santa Maria "ad Nives" di Palazzolo. Velletri: Edizioni Tra 8&9.
