= Palazzo Chigi of Ariccia =

Coordinates: 41.72154°N 12.67222°E

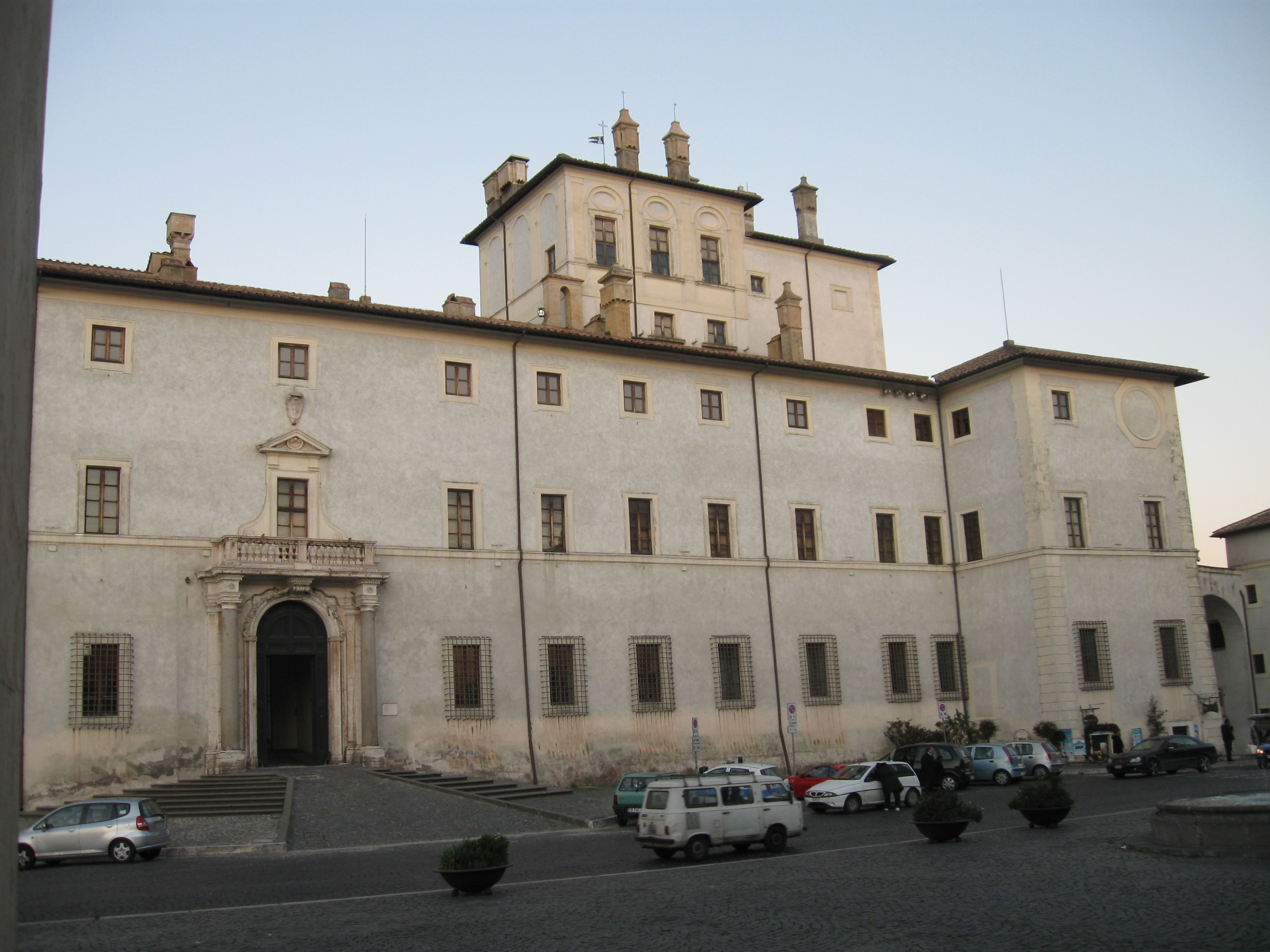
Palazzo Chigi

The Palazzo Chigi of Ariccia was the ducal palace of the Chigi family located in the center of the town of Ariccia, near Rome, Italy.

Originally a 15th-century palace of the Savelli family stood at the site, it was rebuilt during 1664 to 1672, in a Baroque style by the Chigi Family. The work was a collaboration between Gian Lorenzo Bernini and his pupil Carlo Fontana. The sober exterior does not reflect the highly decorated interiors. The palace and Parco Chigi were ceded to the Commune in 1988 by the prince Agostino Chigi Albani della Rovere, and now served as a host of exhibitions and events. It hosts the Museo del Barocco Romano encompassed by some of the remaining Chigi family collections. These include the following paintings:

- Four Seasons by Mario de’ Fiori in collaboration with Carlo Maratti, Bernardino Mei, Giacinto Brandi, Giovanni Maria Morandi, and Filippo Lauri
- Allegory of the Senses by Pier Francesco Mola
- Preparatory sketches (cartoons) for mosaics of the cupola of St Peter's Basilica by Cavalier d’Arpino
- I “feudi Chigi con cani levrieri by Michelangelo Pace also called “il Campidoglio”
- Finti arazzi commissioned by Cardinal Ottoboni from Domenico Paradisi, Michelangelo Ricciolini and Francesco Borgognone for the Palazzo della Cancelleria
- Finti arazzi con giochi di putti by Giovanni Battista Magni “il Modanino”;
- Landscapes by Jos de Momper, Tempestino, and Egidio de Monte
- Pindar and Pan by Salvator Rosa
- Blessed Giovanni Chigi in penitence by Giovanni Battista Gaulli called "Il Baciccio"
- Marine landscape with St Augustine by Jos de Momper and Alessandro Mattia da Farnese.
- Portrait of Pope Clement IX and Cardinal Sigismondo Chigi by Il Baciccio
- Portrait of Cardinal Flavio Chigi by Jacob Ferdinand Voet
- Portrait of Sister Maria Lutugarda by JF Voet
- Portrait of Sister Flavia Virginia by JF Voet
- Portrait of Agostino Chigi by JF Voet
- Portrait of Maria Virginia Borghese by JF Voet
- Serie delle Belle by Anna Caffarelli Minutoli
- Portrait of Maria Virginia Borghese by Giovanni Maria Morandi
- Portrait of Mario Chigi by GM Morandi
- Portrait of venerable Aurelio Chigi by Francesco Vanni
- Portrait of Cardinal Fabio Chigi by Carlo Cesi
- Portrait of Suor Berenice by Francesco Trevisani
- Works by Loreti, Guttembrun, Masucci, and Kobler

The park contains Roman spolia and the remains of buildings used as part of a hunting preserve.
