= Franz Ludwig Catel =

German painter

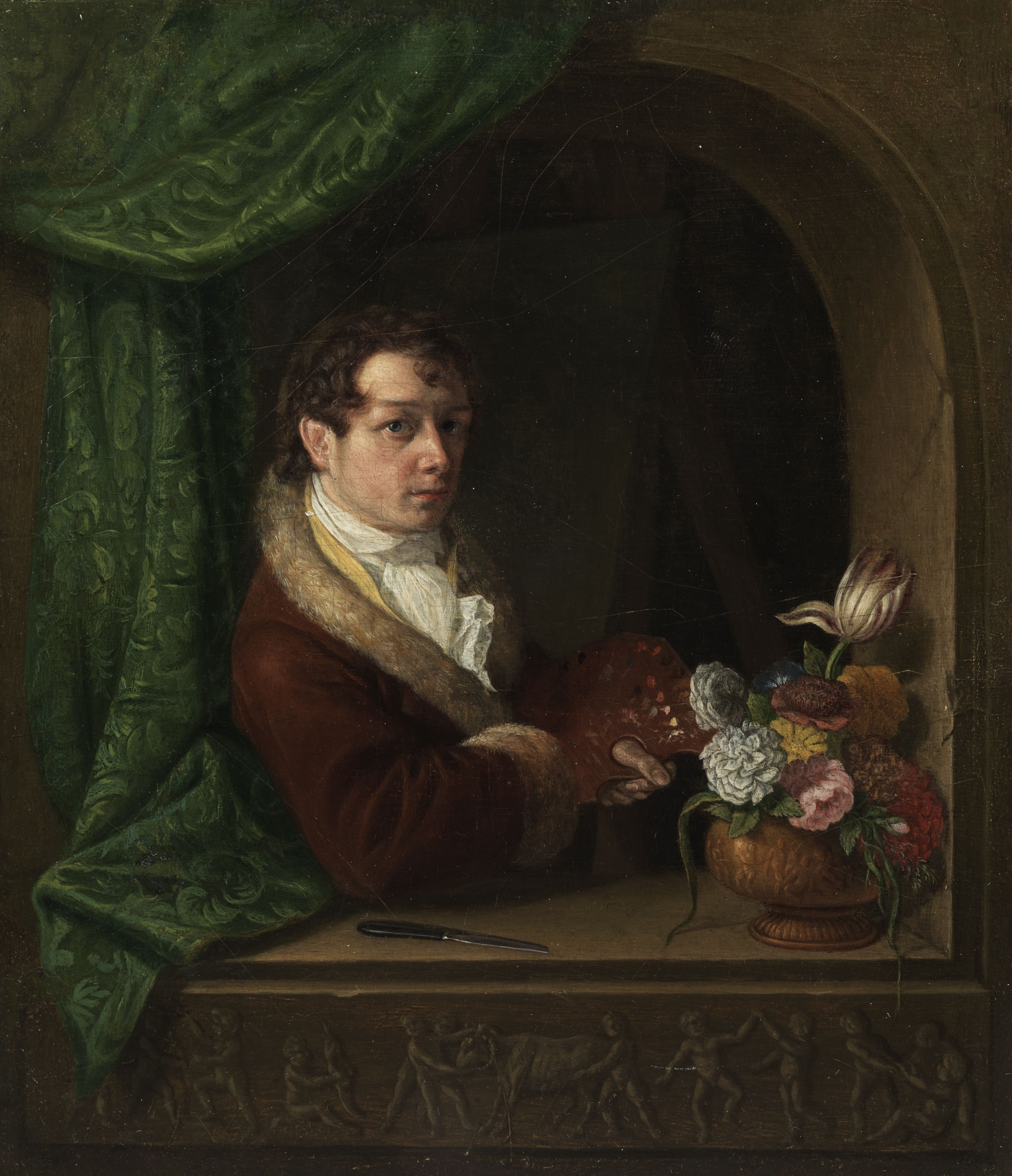
Self-portrait, circa 1810.

Franz Ludwig Catel (22 February 1778 – 19 December 1856) was a German painter. He spent most of his career in Rome.

== Biography ==
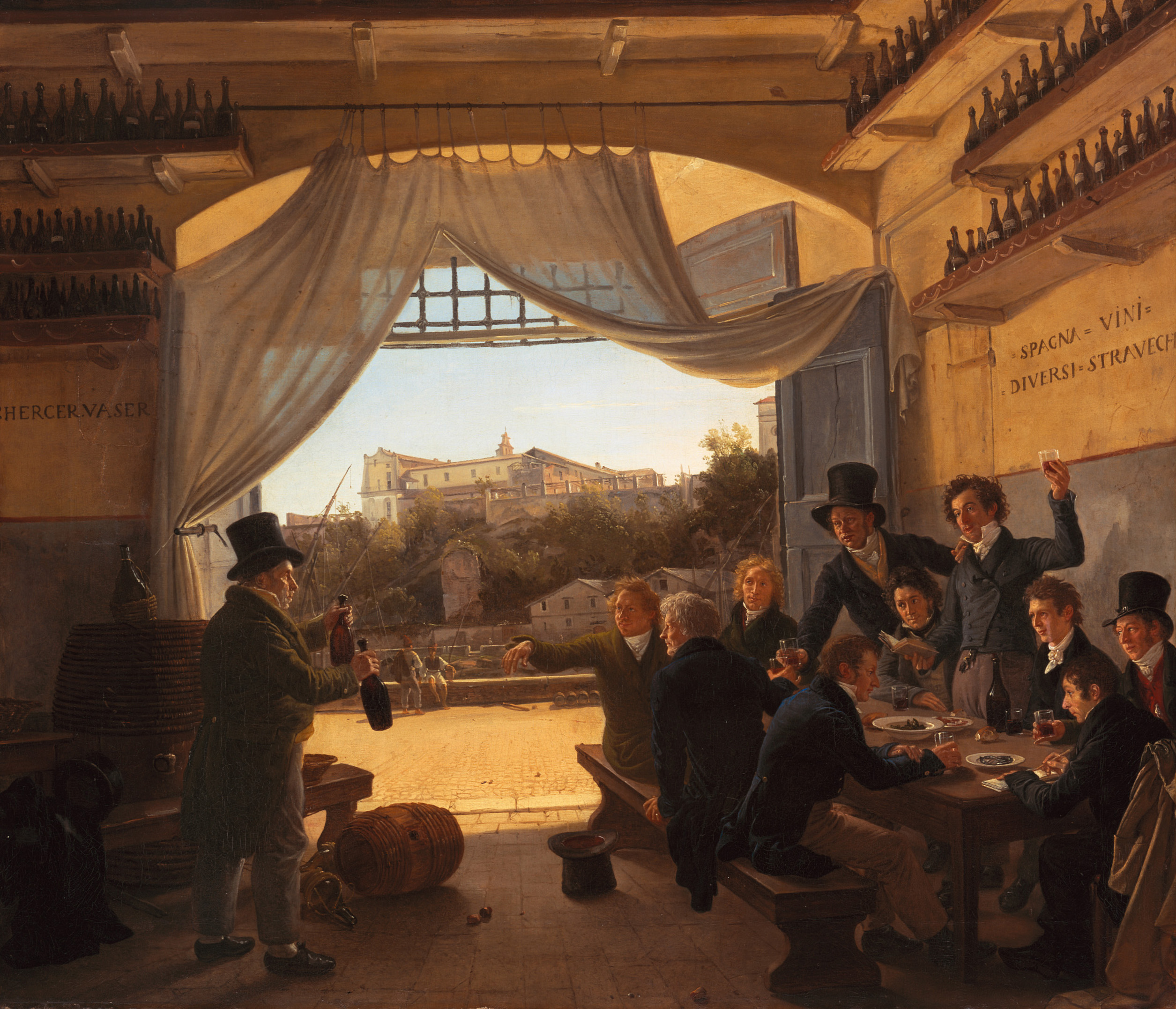
Crown Prince Ludwig in the Spanish Wine Tavern in Rome

Catel was born at Berlin in 1778. He began his artistic career by carving in wood, and then designed book illustrations, including, in 1799, ten plates for Goethe's Hermann and Dorothea. He then worked in Indian ink and water-colours, producing in 1806 a large piece in the latter medium, representing The Death of Nicholas of Bernau, which gained him admission into the Berlin Academy. In 1807 he went to Paris, where he studied oil painting.

The year 1812 found him at Rome, where his education as an artist was much advanced by his connection with Koch, Overbeck, Schadow, and Cornelius.

His inclination led him more especially in the direction of painting landscapes with prominent architectural details or figures in the foreground often moving into the territory of genre painting. He attached himself to the new classic school of landscape, labouring especially to make his perspective tell effectively, and to gain a great mastery over light and shade. His ideas gained much in point of breadth from a visit to Sicily, which he made in company with Prince Golitsuin in 1818.

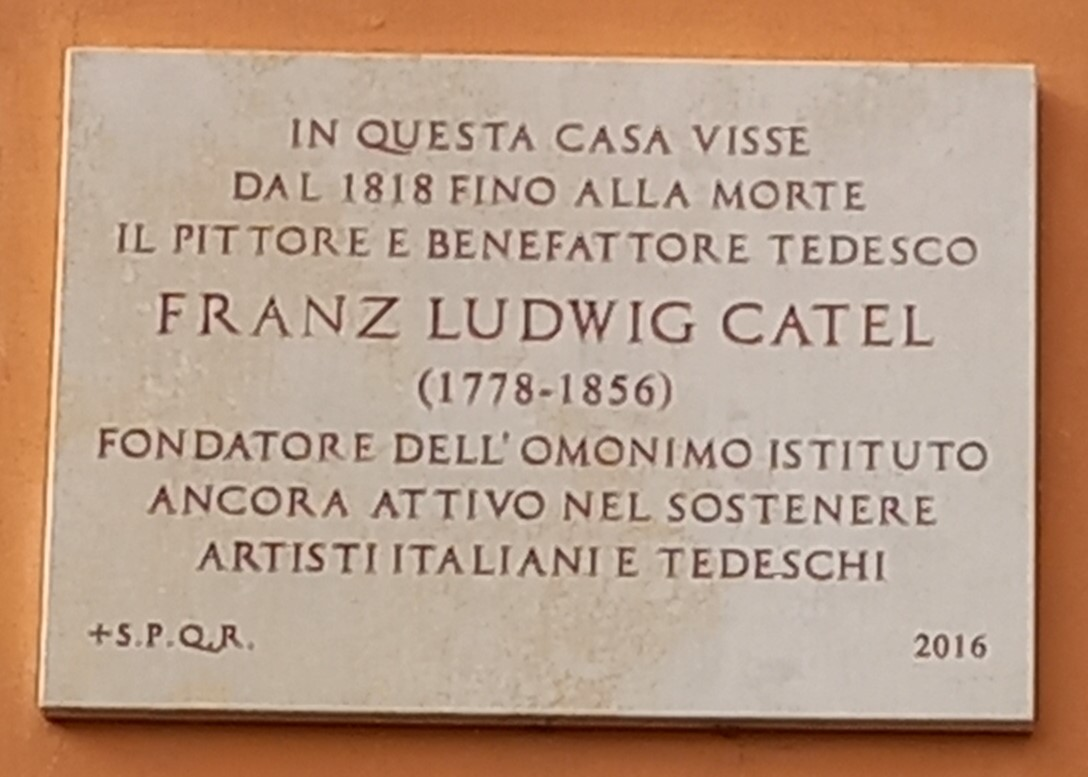
Commemorative plaque in Piazza di Spagna

=== Success ===
In 1824 he painted Crown Prince Ludwig at the Spanish Wine Tavern in Rome (Neue Pinakothek, Munich) a work commissioned by the prince himself, who is shown at an informal gathering of artists, mostly German, with a view of the Aventine Hill visible through an open door. He settled at Macerata in 1830, but returned home on a visit in 1840, on which occasion a professorship was bestowed on him by the King of Prussia.

Catel's landscape subjects included The Moonlight View of the Colonnade of St. Peter's, and The Storm on Mount Etna. In the Berlin Gallery are two Neapolitan views, both painted in 1822, and in the New Pinakothek, Munich, are eight works by him, views in Italy.

The success of his paintings made him prosperous enough to be able to set up and entirely finance a fund for young artists in Rome. He died at Rome in 1856.

== Selected paintings ==
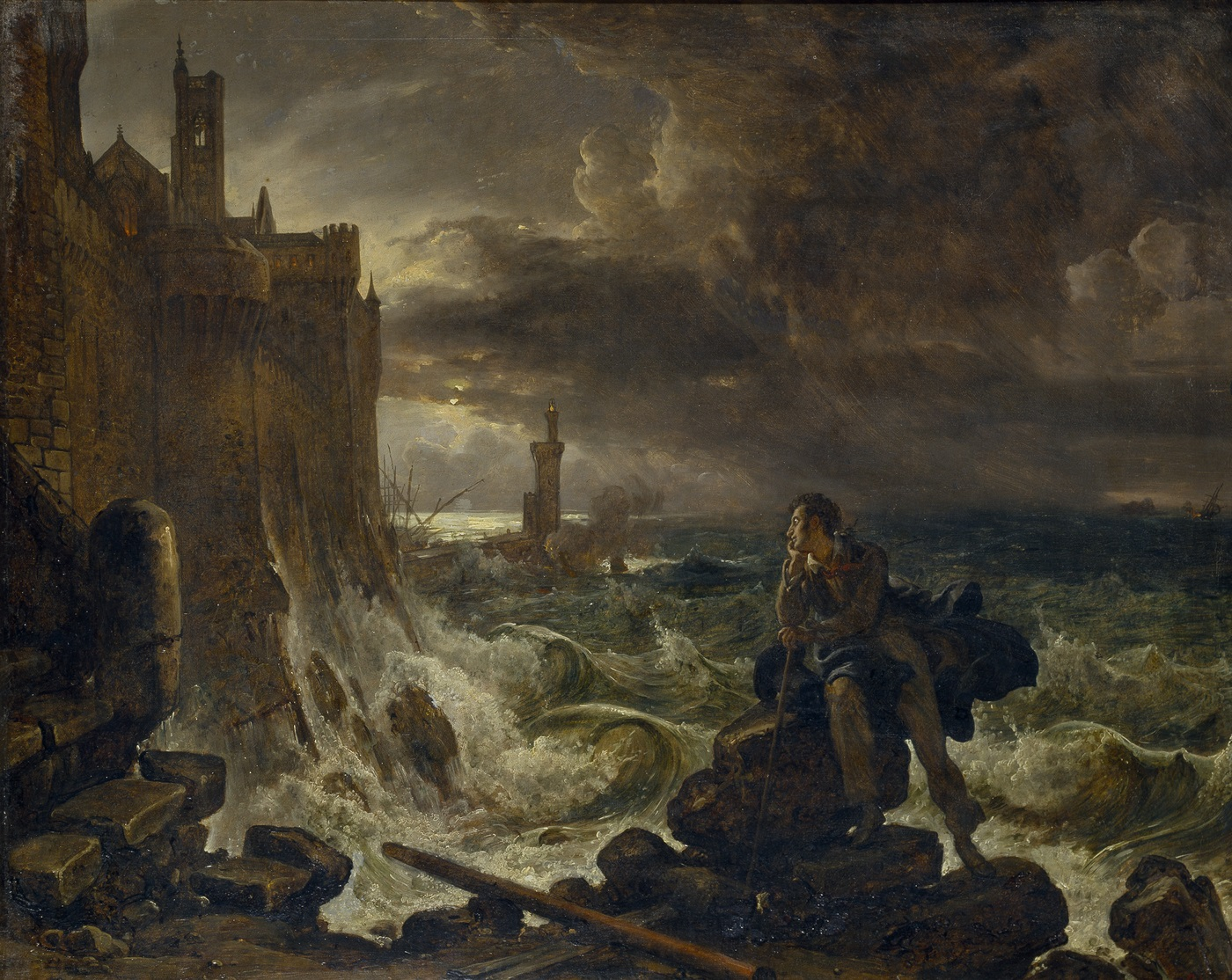
Scene from René by Chateaubriand

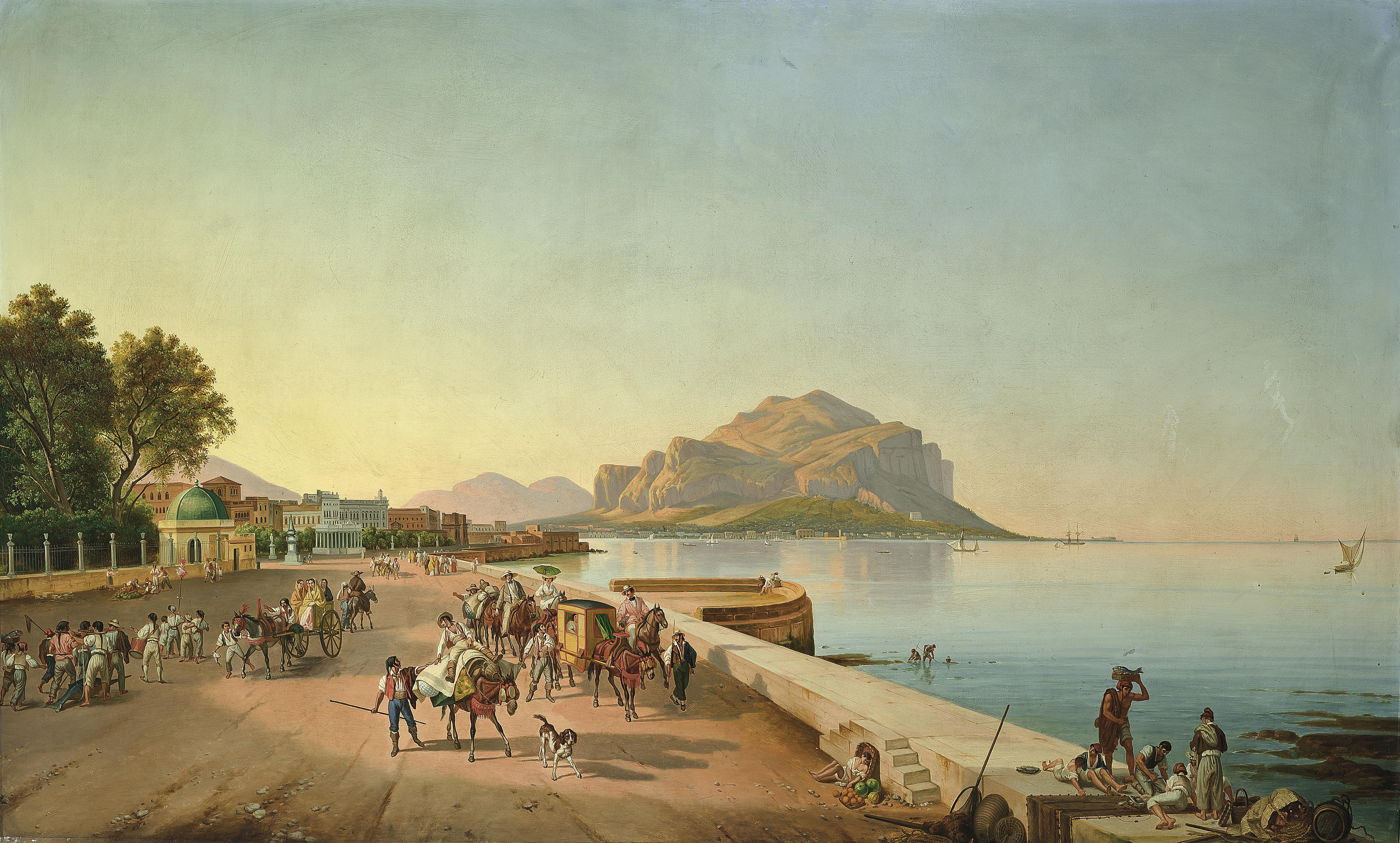
Walk in Palermo

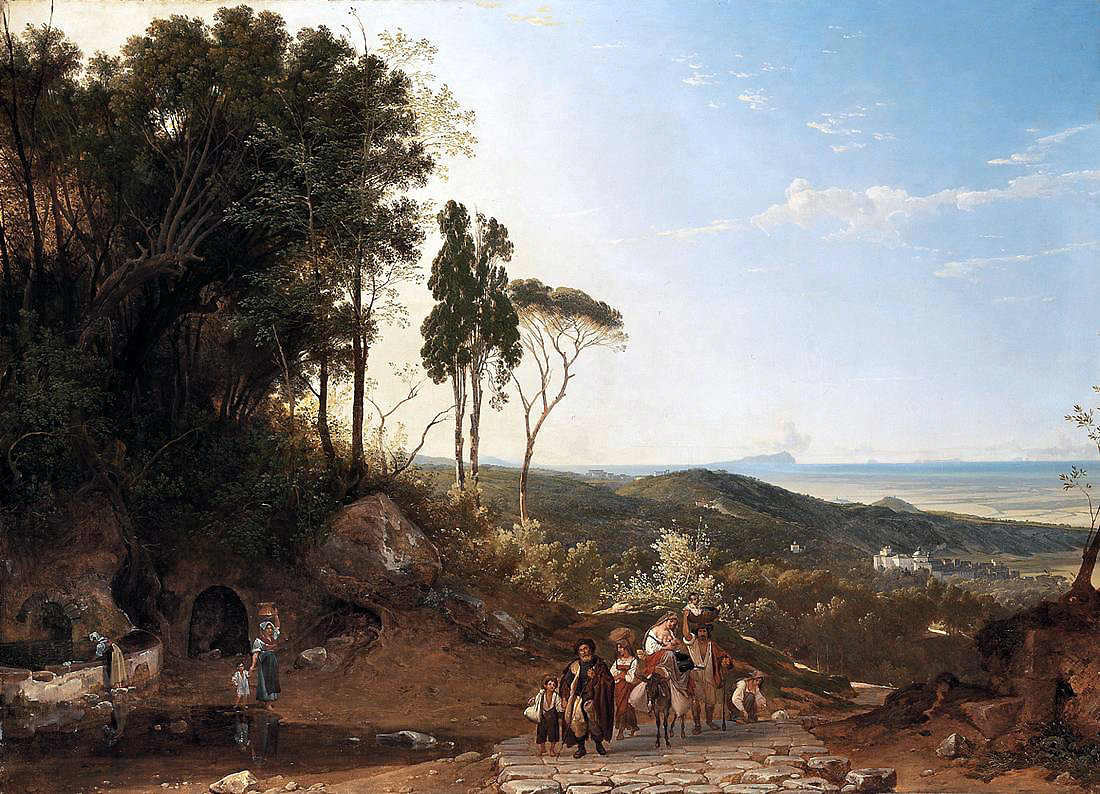
View From Ariccia Toward The Sea

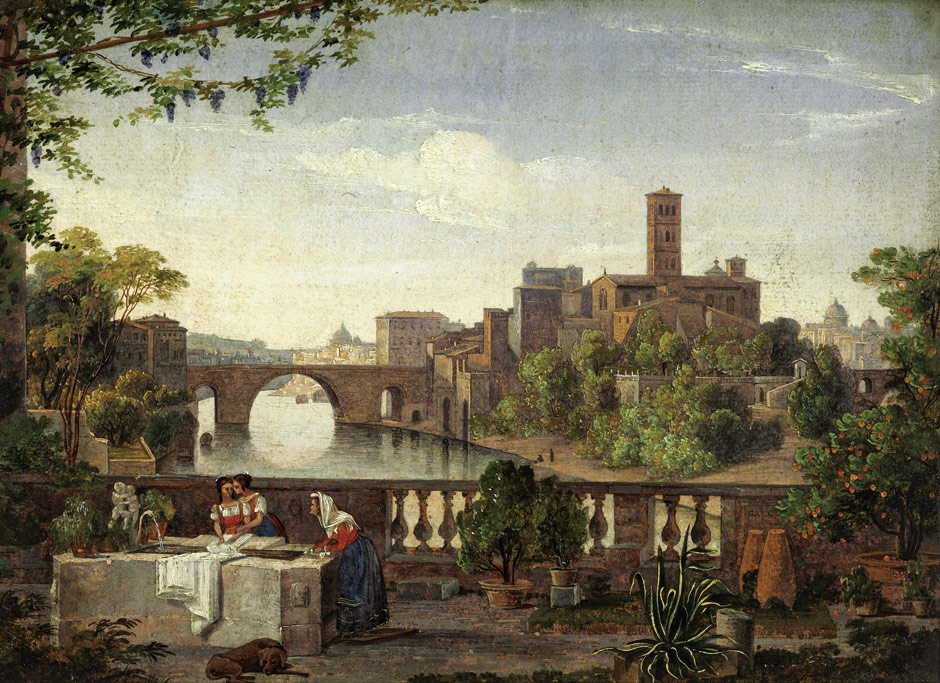
Isle on the Tiber

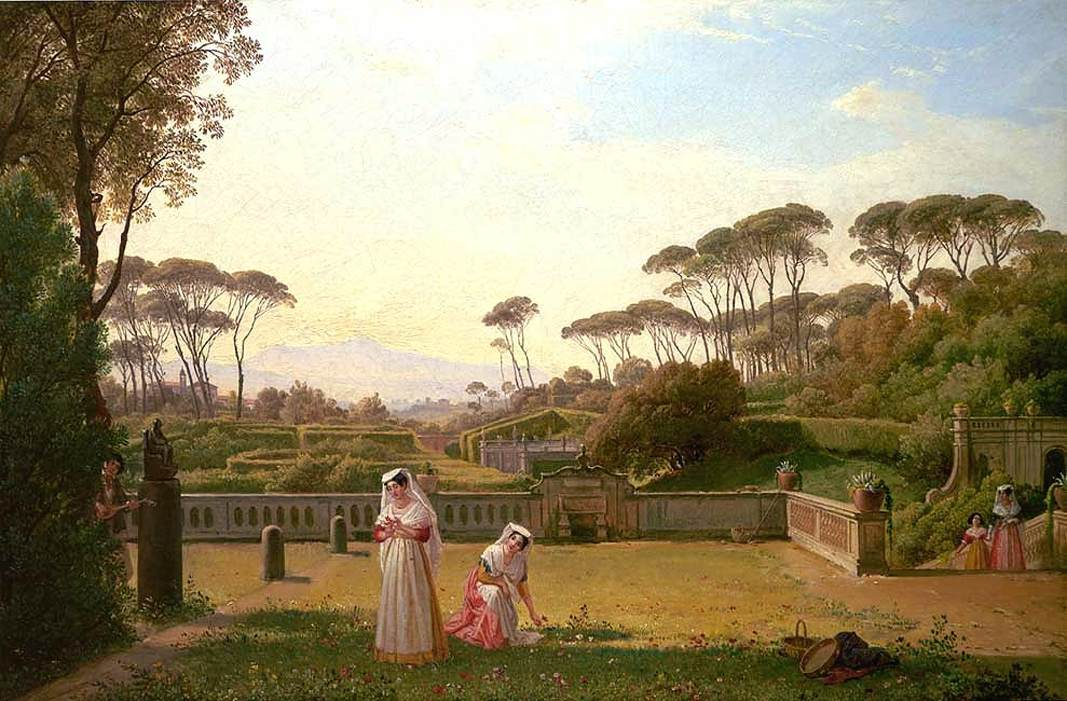
Garden of the Villa Doria Pamphili
in Rome

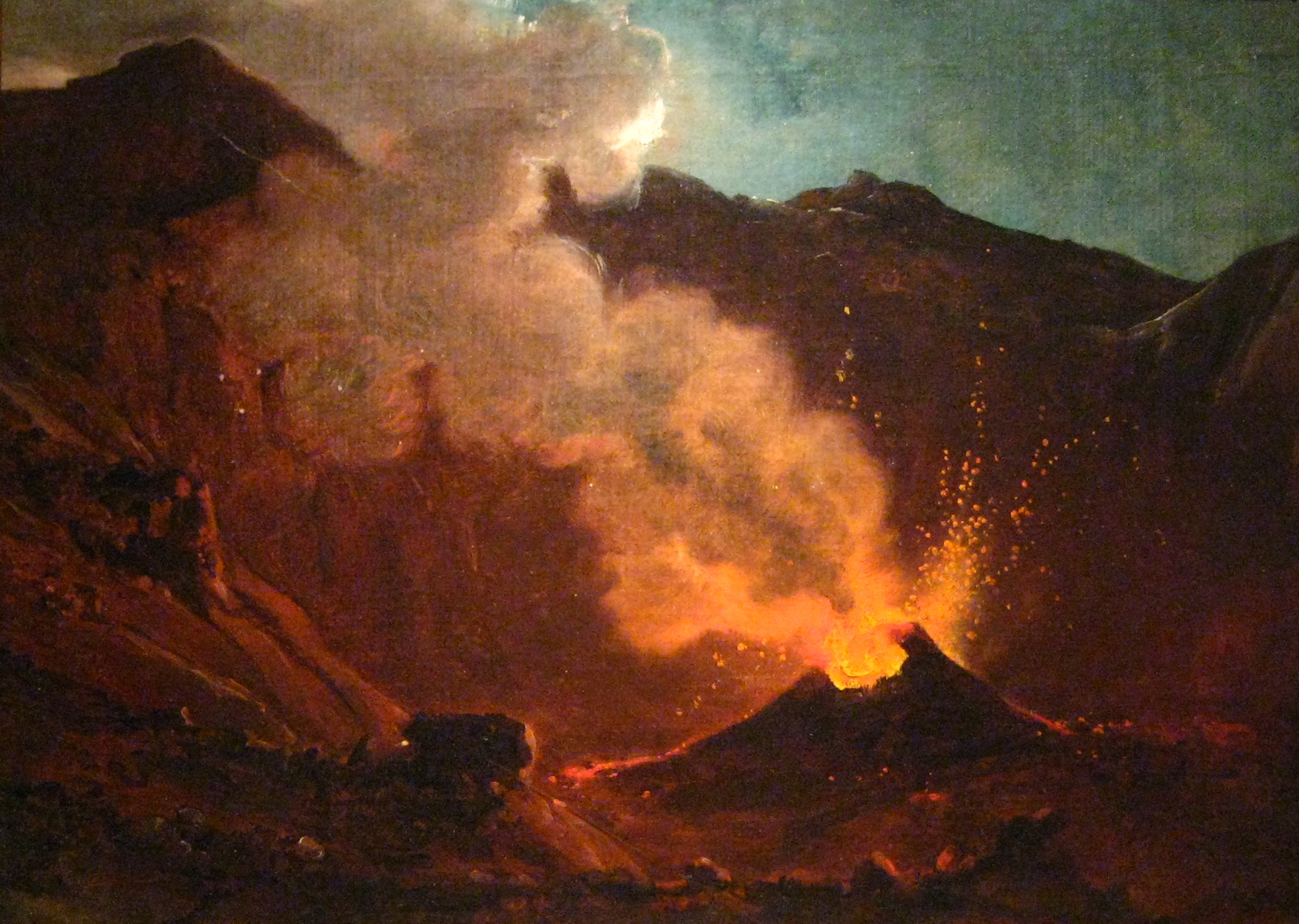
Vesuvius
