= Mikhail Lebedev =

Russian artist

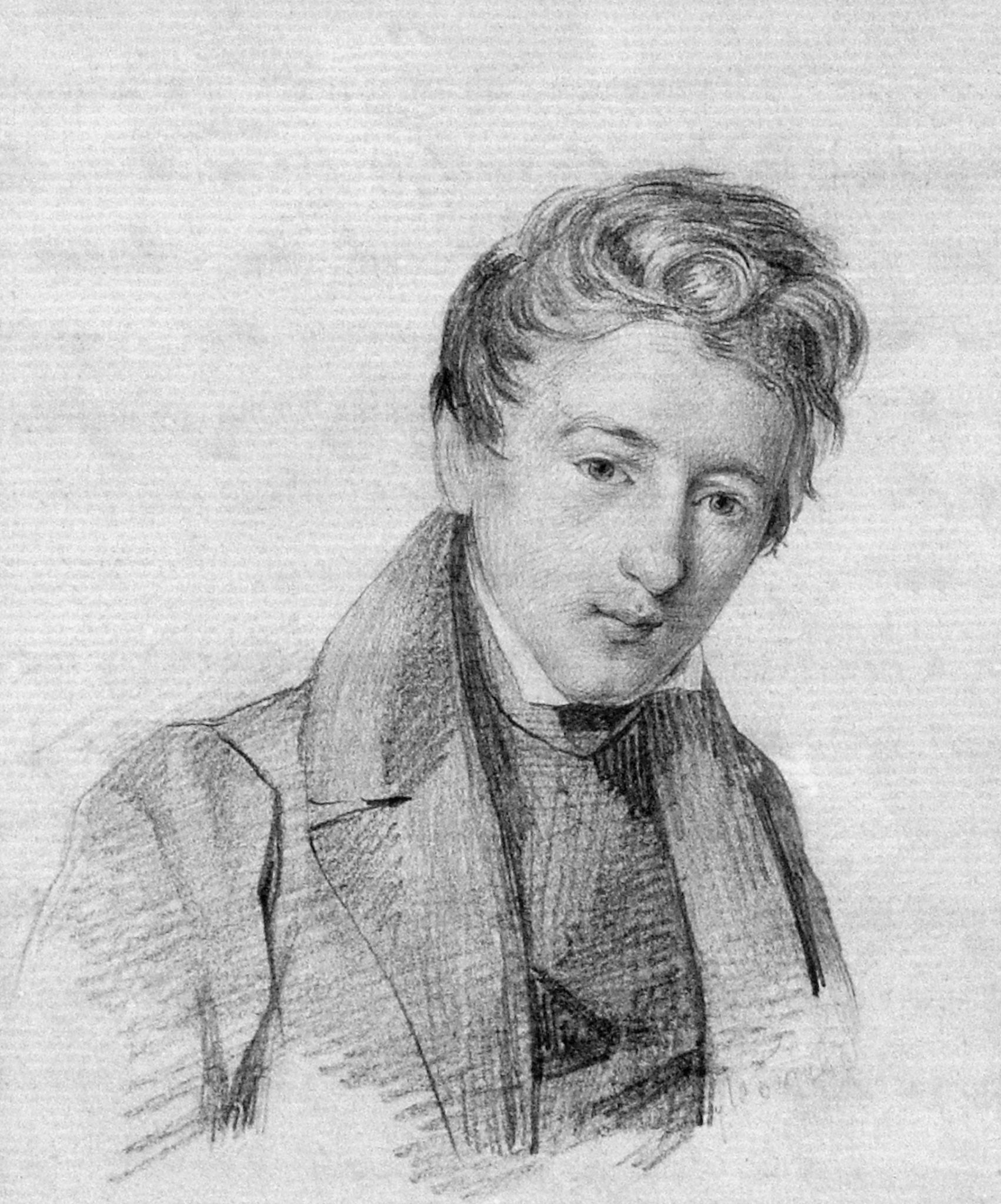
- Portrait drawing by Nikolai Ramazanov, early 1830s, graphite pencil; Tretyakov Gallery, Moscow
- Born: 4 November 1811; Dorpat, Russian Empire
- Died: 13 July 1837 (aged 25); Naples, Kingdom of the Two Sicilies
- Education: Maxim Vorobyov
- Alma mater: Imperial Academy of Arts (1833)
- Known for: Landscape painting
- Awards: Big Gold Medal of the Imperial Academy of Arts (1833)

Mikhail Ivanovich Lebedev (Russian: Михаил Иванович Лебедев; 4 November 1811 – 13 July 1837) was a Russian painter.

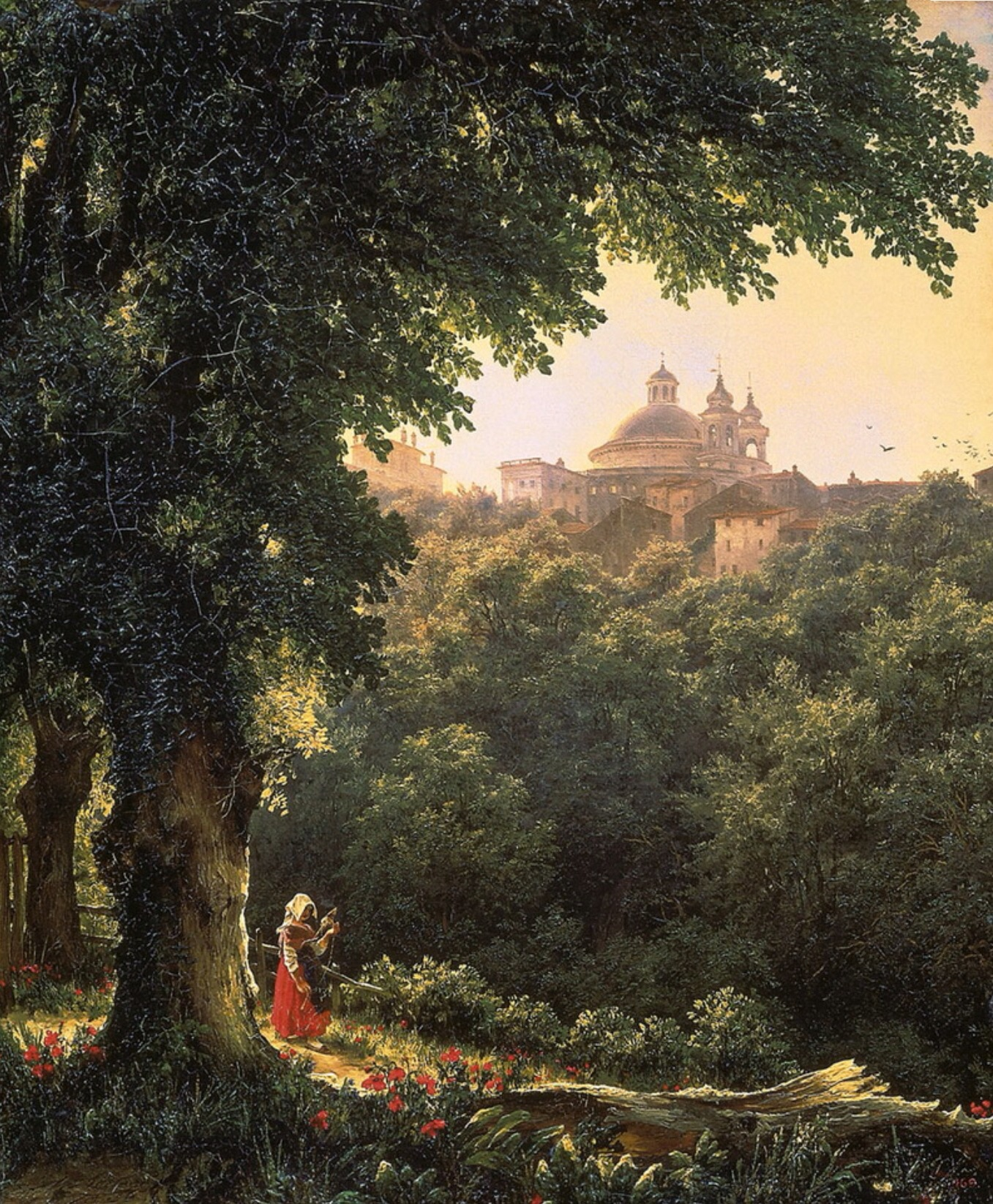
View of Ariccia

He was born in Dorpat into the family of an impoverished serf. His mother and probably also his father were of Estonian origin. In the 1820s, serfdom was abolished in his region and the young Lebedev got an opportunity to study at a nearby school. His artistic endeavours attracted the attention of the Count Pahlen, who sent Lebedev to the Academy at Saint Petersburg with a full scholarship. In the Academy, Lebedev studied under Maxim Vorobiev. In 1833, he got the major gold medal for the painting View of Ladoga.

In 1834, he travelled to Italy on a pension and was met by the Russian artistic colony there, notably the native Karl Brullov. Lebedev loved to paint Italy’s natural landscapes; his landscape paintings are full of coloristic contrasts. Notable paintings derived from this period are Ariccia (near Rome) and View of Castel Gandolfo. Lebedev’s landscapes had an immediate success with the public. In 1837, Lebedev went to work in Naples, where an epidemic of cholera started. The artist became ill and died at the age of twenty-five.
