= Rocca di Papa =

- Comune
- Comune di Rocca di Papa
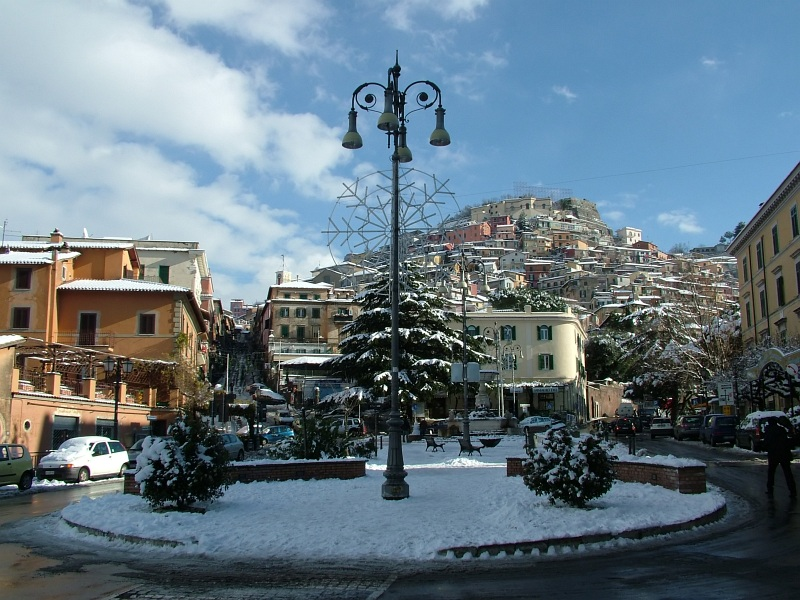
- View of Rocca di Papa

- Coat of arms

- Location within Italy Location within Lazio
- Coordinates: 41°45′40″N 12°42′33″E
- Country: Italy
- Region: Lazio
- Metropolitan city: Rome (RM)
- Frazioni: Pratoni del Vivaro

Government
  - Mayor: Veronica Cimino

Area
  - Total: 40 km^{2} (15 sq mi)
- Elevation: 680 m (2,230 ft)

Population (30 April 2017)
  - Total: 17,166
  - Density: 430/km^{2} (1,100/sq mi)
- Demonym: Roccheggiani
- Time zone: UTC+1 (CET)
  - Summer (DST): UTC+2 (CEST)
- Postal code: 00040
- Dialing code: 06
- Patron saint: Saint Charles Borromeo
- Saint day: 4 November
- Website: Official website

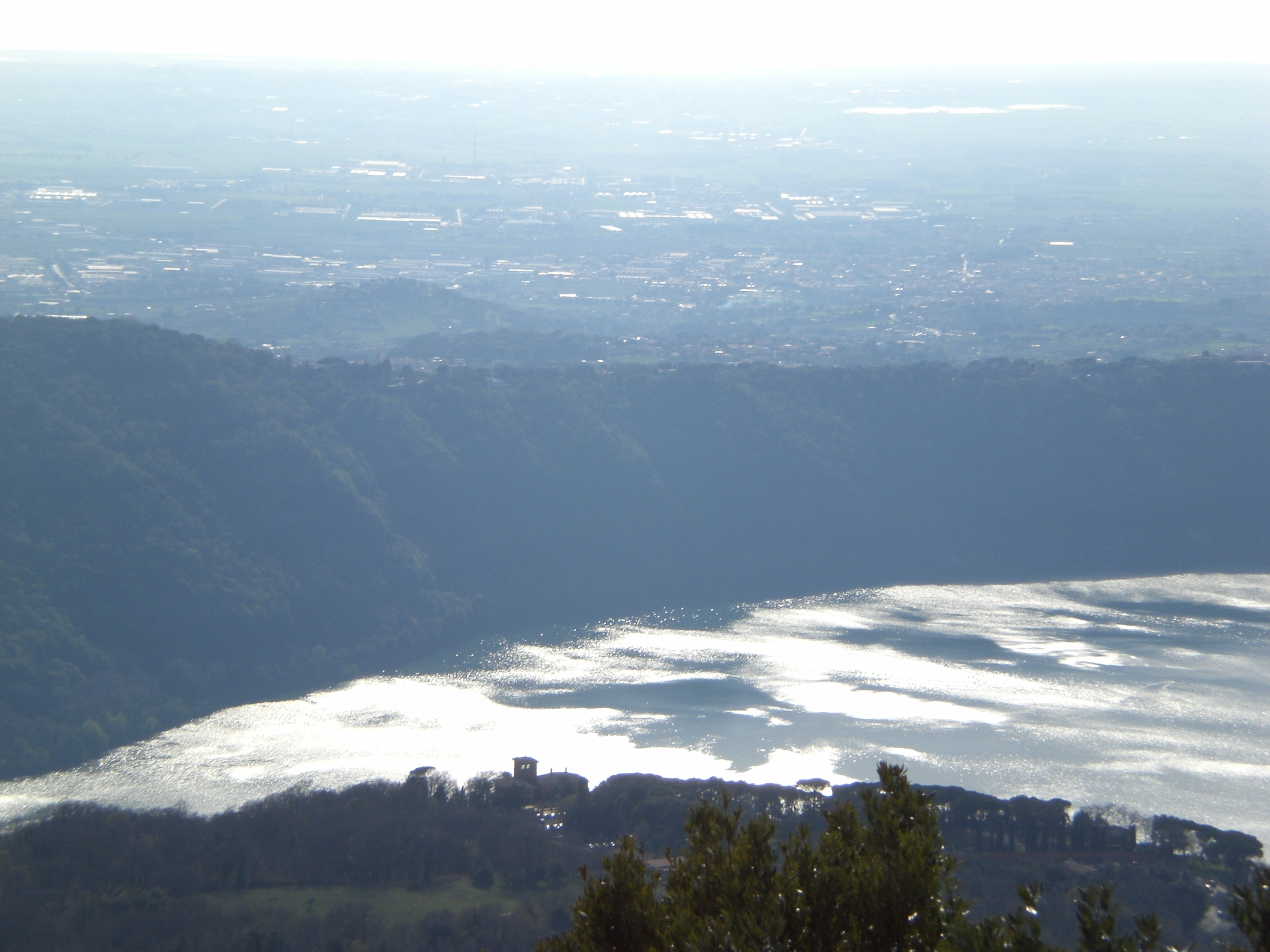
Convent of Palazzola

Rocca di Papa (Roman Castles Romanesco: 'A Rocca) is a small town and comune (municipality) in the Metropolitan City of Rome, Lazio, Italy. It is one of the Castelli Romani about 25 kilometres (16 mi) southeast of Rome on the Alban Hills. It is close to the other communes of Velletri, Rocca Priora, Monte Compatri, Grottaferrata, Albano and Marino. It is the center of the Regional Park known as the "Parco Regionale dei Castelli Romani".

== History ==
The city is built on the location of the Latin city of Cabum.

Documents from 12th century name Rocca di Papa as Castrum Rocce de Papa ("Rock of the Pope Castle"), because Pope Eugene III lived there. In 1541, Pier Luigi Farnese and French troops destroyed the castle. In 1855, the town proclaimed the "Rocca di Papa Republic" against prince Colonna and the Papal States.

In 1889, the "Royal Geodynamic Observatory" was built on the top of Rocca di Papa, near the little Church of the Crucified. Between 1922 and 1935, the scientist Guglielmo Marconi carried out several experiments from this building in radio-transmission, wireless transmission and broadcasting.

In 1944, during World War II, Rocca di Papa was bombed, destroying the town centre. 34 people died in that airstrike, and 35 more died in a second one on 25 May. The city was liberated from the Nazi German occupation on 4 June 1944 by the 85th Infantry Division, of the United States Army.

In June 2019, an accidental explosion at the town hall building killed Mayor Emanuele Crestini and another man, while several others were injured.

== Main sights ==
- Papal Fortress, known since medieval times but restored in the current form during the reign of Pope Paul III.
- Santuario Madonna del Tufo
- Chiesa del Crocefisso
- Church of the Assunta, built in the 18th century. It is dedicated to the Assumption, and was rebuilt after the earthquake of 1806 in larger size.
- Fontana della Barcaccia
- Quartiere dei Bavaresi, built by Bavarian militiamen left here by Emperor Louis IV in 1328.
- Via Sacra (The Sacred Way of Monte Cavo).
- Convent of Palazzolo, located on top of a rock dominating the east shore of Lake Albano. The old Roman buildings (on the site on which some scholars place the ancient Albalonga) was turned into monasteries and a church dedicated to Saint Mary of Palatiolo. In the orchard of the convent is a sepulchral monument of the 2nd century BC with a staircase pyramid. Currently, the Abbey and the church belong to the English College.

== Economy ==
The economy of Rocca di Papa is mostly based on tourism and agriculture, the latter dominated by wine and vine production.

== Culture ==
=== Festivals ===
The most important festival held in Rocca di Papa is the Roast Chestnut Festival (3rd week-end of October), in which it is possible to eat the roast chestnut (the "Rocchicianelle") with wines of Castelli Romani pouring out by stands in the streets of the town.

=== Geophysical Museum ===
The Geophysical Museum shows scientific data about the inside of the Earth. It has preservation tools and scientific documents of the geology, geography and terrestrial physics of the Earth.

=== Astronomic observatory ===
The astronomic observatory "Franco Fuligni", located in the frazione of Vivaro, is a public structure, available to whoever (skygazings, curious, amateur astronomers, groups and students) is interested in astronomy.

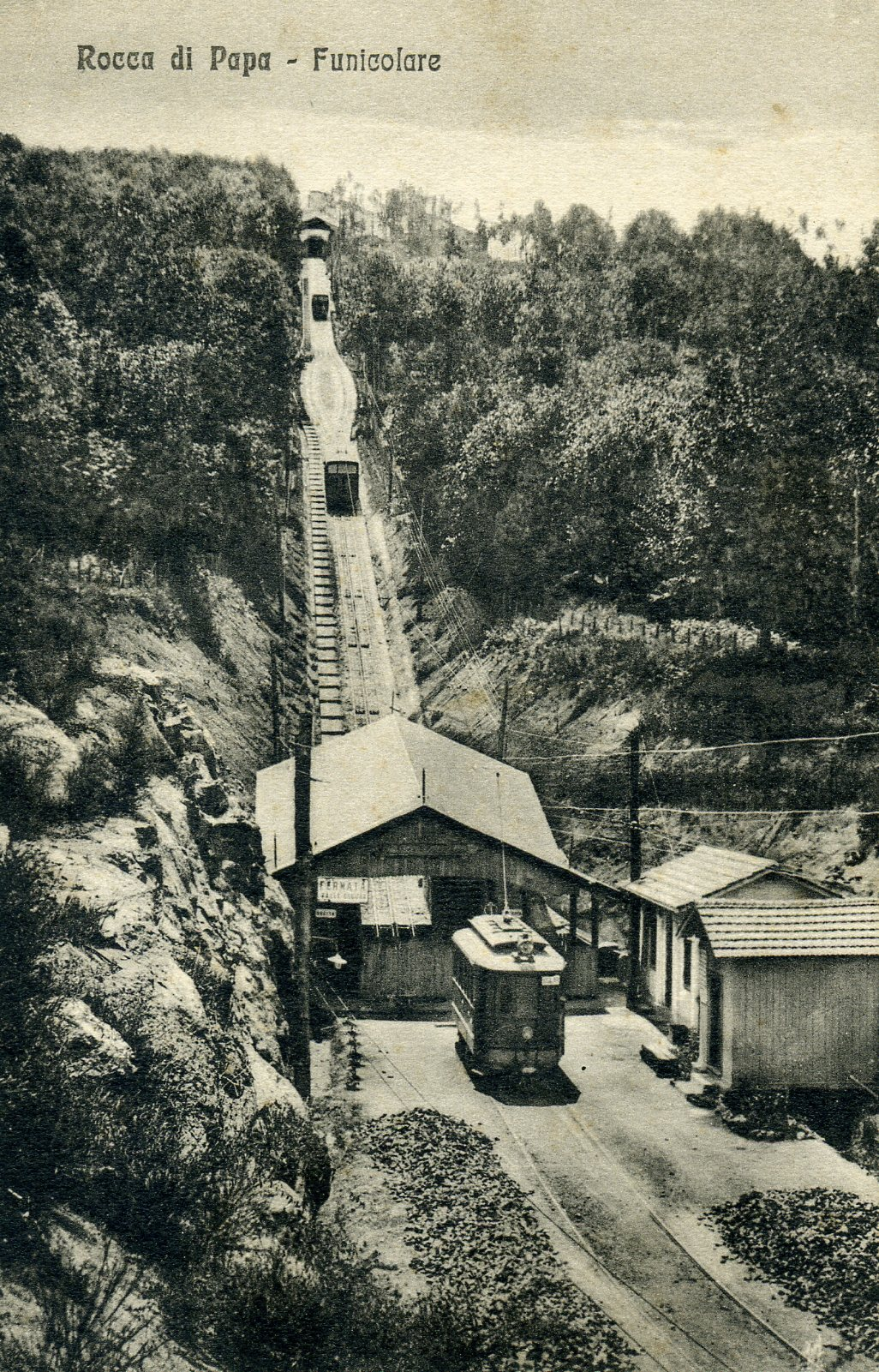
Rocca di Papa funicular 1907, "Valle Oscura" station

== Sports ==
There is the Federal Equestrian Centre of C.O.N.I. – Pratoni del Vivaro. It is situated on a knoll in the center of the communal farm of "Domatore". Since 1960, when the equipment for the horse-riding events was installed for the Olympic Games, it has been the center of equestrian championships and a meeting place for horse-riders. The equipment has been improved and enlarged to form an adequate spot for the preparation of the best horse-riders, offering an excellent track with every kind of difficulty and obstacle.

== Transport ==
The alpine-style funicular of Rocca di Papa was inaugurated on 12 August 1907 (although it had already entered service on 10 October 1906). It connected "Valle Oscura" to "Viale Silvio Spaventa" and worked on the water-ballast counterbalancing principle, which was also regulated according to the number of passengers.

The Valle Oscura funicular was dismantled and on 28 July 1932, a new electric funicular was inaugurated, this connected "Valle Vergine" station (also called Anello) with "Piazza Margherita" (later, Piazza della Repubblica), this remained in service until 15 December 1963 before giving way to new means of transport. The upper station, which became a bus station, still contains a cabin from the electric funicular which was used to transport passengers for thirty years. The lower cabin was partially destroyed during a fire in 2003.

After the regional government of Lazio officially assigned a budget of 6 million euros to the reopening of the funicular, on 29 October 2013, work began on reconstruction of the funicular, half a century after its closure. The project provides for the reconstruction of the funicular on its old site, with associated access works and the construction of an access road to connect the station with the main road between Rocca di Papa and Grottaferrata.

Rocca di Papa was also connected to Rome by the Castelli Romani tramway, dismantled in the 1960s and replaced by a bus service. Direct road connection to Rome is provided by the SS511 Anagnina State Road and by the Via dei Laghi (former SS217 State Road). The nearest railway station is that of Frascati.

== People ==
- Massimo Taparelli (1798–1866) the Marquis d'Azeglio, Italian statesman, novelist and painter
- Wilhelm Achtermann (1799–1884) sculptor
- Rudy La Scala (1954–) singer and composer
- Luise Rinser (1911–2002) writer
- Domenico Tojetti (Rocca di Papa 1807 – San Francisco 1892) painter
- Anita Ekberg (Malmö 1931 – 2015 Rocca di Papa) actress
- Chiara Lubich (Trento 1920 – Rocca di Papa 2008) founder of the ecumenical Focolare movement.

== Twin cities ==
- Landsberg am Lech, Germany
