= Domenico Tojetti =

Italian-American painter

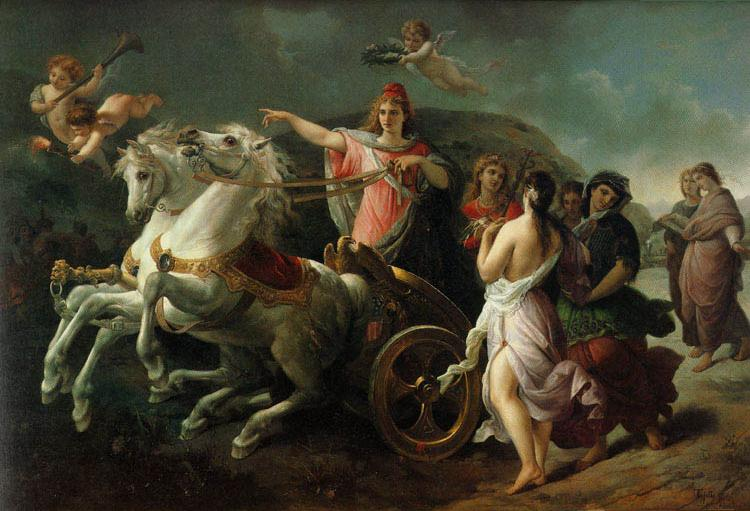
Progress of America.

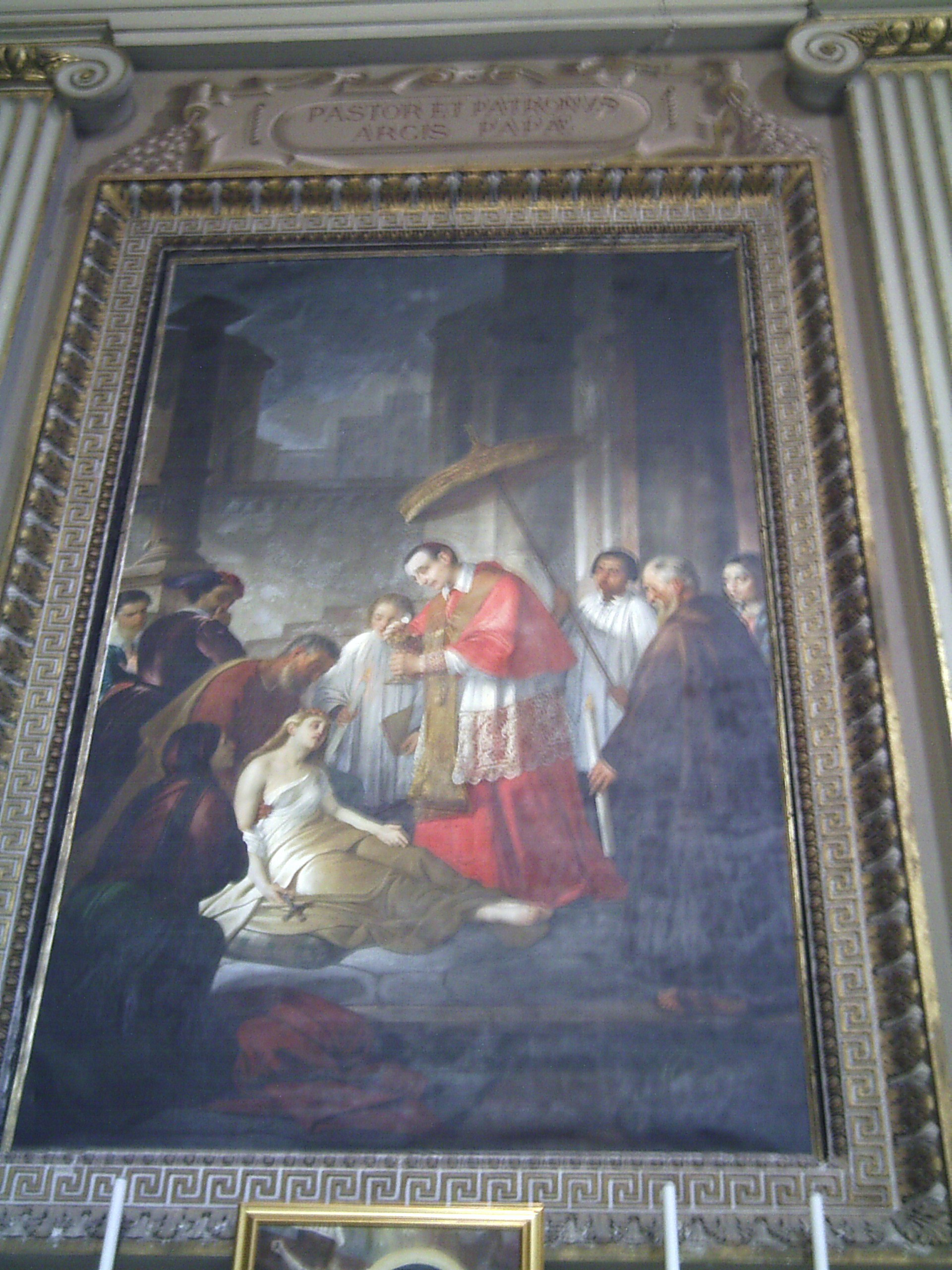
San Carlo Borromeo, Rocca di Papa

Domenico Tojetti (1807–1892) was an Italian American painter.

Born in Rocca di Papa, near Rome, the artist frequented the Roman circle of the Torlonia Princes, providing frescos in the ballroom of Villa Torlonia under the direction of his teacher, Francesco Coghetti.

The artist provided also frescoes in the churches of Rome, including the Basilica di San Paolo fuori le Mura and Sant'Agnese fuori le Mura. In this period he developed friendships with Constantino Brumidi, who moved to the United States in 1852, and with Leonardo Massabò.

Domenico Tojetti had a son in 1849. Virgilio Tojetti was born in Italy. He studied under his father and later in Paris under Gerome and Bouguereau. Virgilio became known for his frescos and genre scene paintings and exhibited widely. He painted murals in the Savoy Hotel, Hoffman House and others in New York City.

In 1867 Tojetti moved with his family to Guatemala, then Mexico, and finally to San Francisco, California, where he produced paintings for churches, public and private buildings.

He died in San Francisco in 1892.
