= Parco Chigi =

Coordinates: 41.725°N 12.671°E

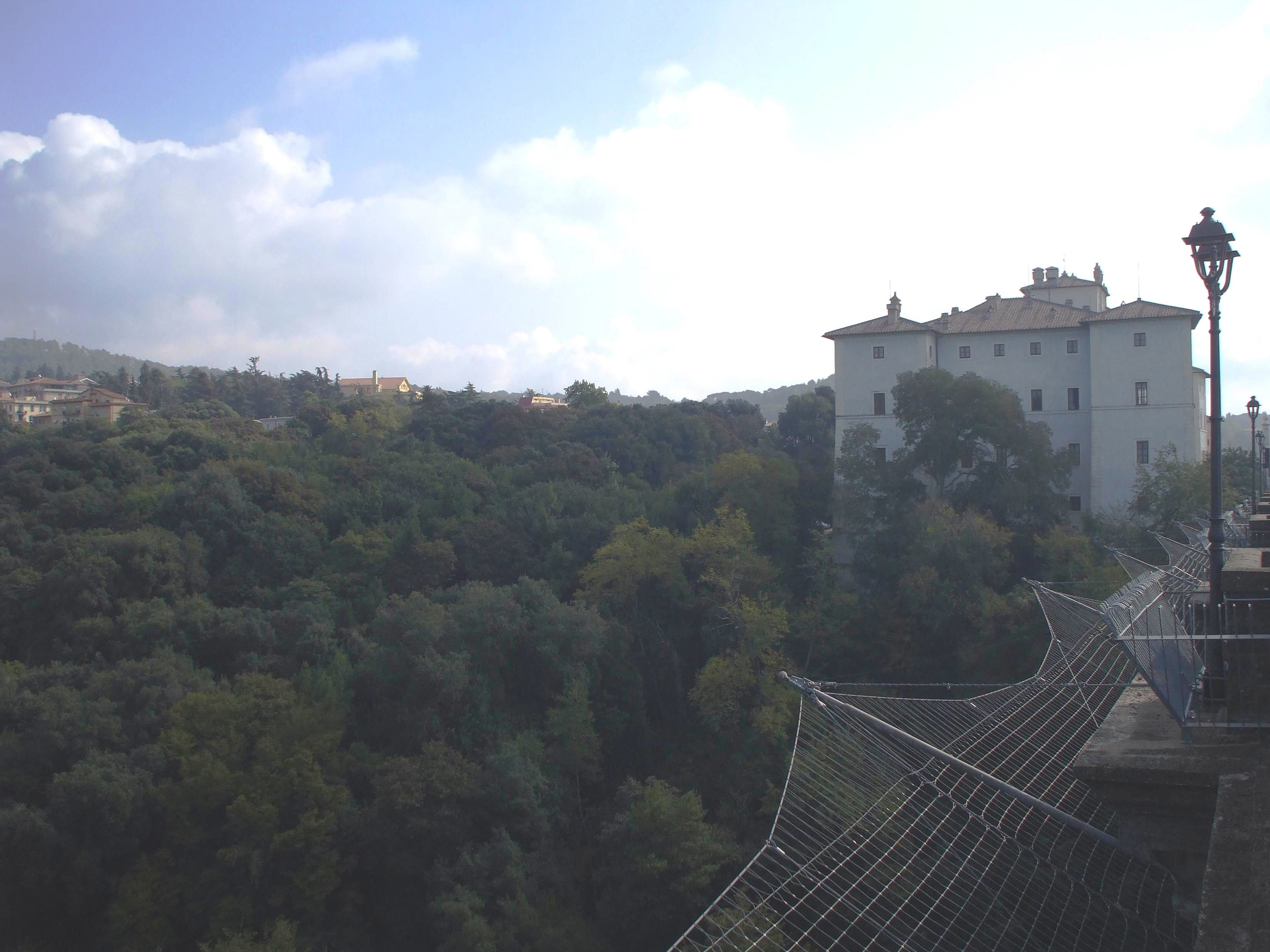
Parco Chigi and Palazzo Chigi viewed from the Ariccia bridge.

Parco Chigi (Chigi Park) of Ariccia is a municipal green space of 28 hectares located in the municipality of Ariccia, in the province of Rome, in the area of the Castelli Romani.

The first center of the park dates back to the sixteenth century; however, the current configuration is due to a series of interventions carried out by the Chigi family, who owned the park between 1661 and 1988. Today, the entire area is a property of the Municipality of Ariccia.

Parco Chigi is annexed to the historic Palazzo Chigi of Ariccia. In regards to the complex of the palace and the park, some well-known architects contributed, such as Gian Lorenzo Bernini and Carlo Fontana.

The park is particularly important within the regional park of the Castelli Romani: in fact, it is one of the few green areas of the Colli Albani in which there has been no penetration of chestnut trees, but the oldest plant species have survived, mostly oaks.

The park has a rich history dating back to ancient times. The wooded area that now makes up the park was known as nemus Aricinum during the Roman era, and was dedicated to the goddess Diana. After the advent of Christianity, the sacred nature of the forest was lost, and it eventually became a hunting reserve during the Renaissance owned by the Savelli family.

In the 17th century, the Chigi family, a prominent Roman noble family, purchased the town of Ariccia and the surrounding area, including the park. They transformed the park into an elegant Baroque garden, featuring statues, fountains, and other ornate features.

Other notable features of the park include the Uccelliera, an aviary built in the 17th century, and the Vignola, a small building originally used as a vineyard. The park also contains a neviera, a structure used for storing snow during the summer months.
