= Emanuele Crestini =

Italian politician (1972–2019)

Emanuele Crestini (24 June 1972 – 20 June 2019) was an Italian politician, who served as the mayor of the municipality of Rocca di Papa from 2016 until his death in 2019.

== Biography ==
Having graduated in Political Science at the Libera Università Maria SS. Assunta in Rome in 2013, Crestini began his political career in 2011, being elected municipal councilor of Rocca di Papa. After graduating, he worked as a merchant.

In 2016, Crestini is a candidate for mayor of Rocca di Papa at the head of a coalition of civic lists, later elected to the ballot (the first in the history of the municipality), defeating the candidate of the Democratic Party.

In 2018, following the docking of the Diciotti ship at the port of Catania with 177 migrants on board, the municipality of Rocca di Papa welcomed a group of migrants into the reception center Mondo Migliore. The affair leads to tensions between citizens willing to welcome refugees and extreme right-wing militants against their arrival; the mayor Crestini proceeds to the reception of the refugees, underlining how the choice of this transfer had been made by the interior minister Matteo Salvini.

On 10 June 2019, following a gas leak, an explosion devastated part of the municipality of Rocca di Papa and neighboring buildings: the explosion injured 16 people, including Crestini, who remained to evacuate the building. Transferred to the Sant'Eugenio Hospital in Rome with burns on 35% of the body, Crestini died on the evening of 20 June 2019, four days before he would have turned 47. On 16 June the municipal delegate, Vincenzo Eleuteri, died of injuries he suffered in the explosion.
