= Ariccia =

- Comune
- Comune di Ariccia
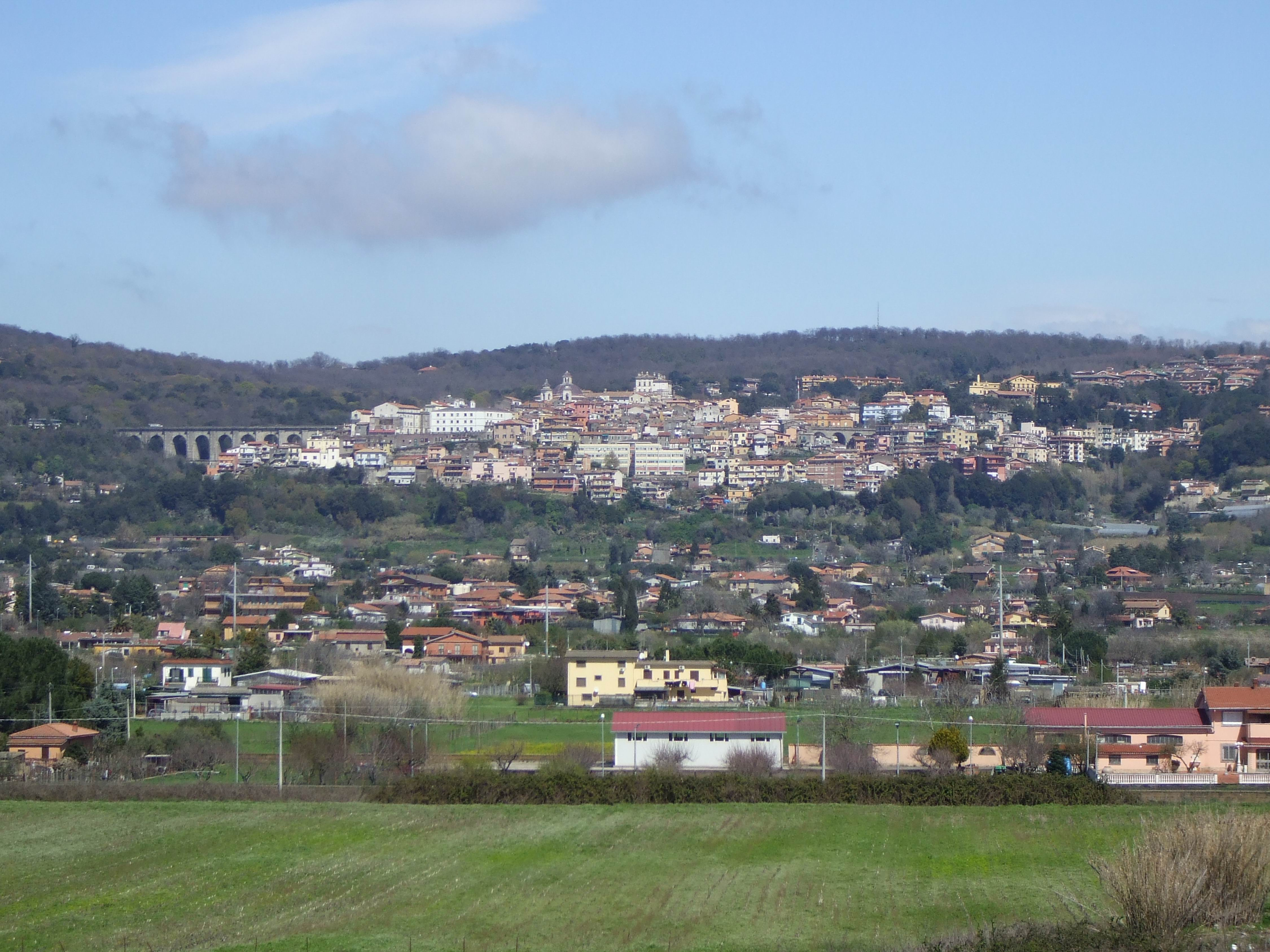
- Ariccia and Vallericcia

- Coat of arms

- Location of Ariccia in Italy Ariccia (Lazio)
- Coordinates: 41°43′12″N 12°40′16″E
- Country: Italy
- Region: Lazio
- Metropolitan city: Rome (RM)
- Frazioni: Cecchina, Fontana di Papa

Government
  - Mayor: Gianuca Staccoli

Area
  - Total: 18 km^{2} (6.9 sq mi)
- Elevation: 412 m (1,352 ft)

Population (31 May 2017)
  - Total: 19,036
  - Density: 1,100/km^{2} (2,700/sq mi)
- Demonym: Ariccini or (dialect) Aricciaroli
- Time zone: UTC+1 (CET)
  - Summer (DST): UTC+2 (CEST)
- Postal code: 00072
- Dialing code: 06
- Patron saint: St. Apollonia
- Saint day: February 9
- Website: Official website

Ariccia (Latin: Aricia) is a town and comune in the Metropolitan City of Rome, Central Italy, 25 kilometres (16 mi) southeast of Rome. It is in the Alban Hills of the Lazio (Latium) region and could be considered an extension of Rome's southeastern suburbs. One of the Castelli Romani towns, Ariccia is located in the regional park known as the "Parco Regionale dei Castelli Romani".

== Overview ==
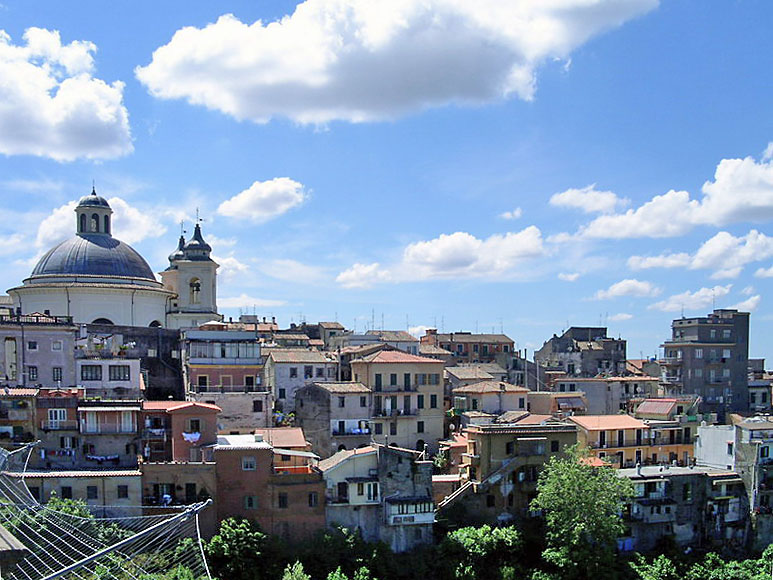
View of the historical centre from the Ariccia bridge.

Ariccia is the center of a region that was extremely important in Roman and pre-Roman mythology and religion because of its association with the goddess Diana and the god Virbius. Legend also recalls that it served as a temporary burial place of the Greek hero Orestes. Ariccia was one of the oldest cities of ancient Latium, and as the leader of the Latin League was a serious contender against Rome during the early days of the Roman Republic.

In modern times, Ariccia has become famous for its porchetta, pork that is slowly roasted with herbs and wild fennel, and it has been known since historical times for its wine. The comune of Ariccia includes the frazioni of Vallericcia and Fontana di Papa. It is bounded by the communes of Albano Laziale, Castel Gandolfo, Genzano di Roma and Marino Laziale.

== History ==
Ancient legend connects the town's name and Aricia, the wife of Hippolytus (Virbius), the Roman forest god who lived in the sacred forests near Aricia. According to a vague reference by Gaius Julius Solinus, Ariccia was founded by Archilocus Siculus ("Archilocus of the Siculi" or Sicels) in very ancient times.

Ruins found in the city confirm the existence of a settlement in the 8th–9th centuries BC. From the end of the 6th century BC until 338 BC, the city was the central member of the Latin League.

In its territory, which then included the Lake of Nemi, was located the sanctuary of Diana Aricina (or Diana Nemorensis) held by the Latin cities in common, and presided over by the Rex Nemorensis. The association with the cult of Diana led to its development as an influential and affluent centre of healing and medicine.

In 508 BC, Lars Porsena king of Clusium (at that time reputed to be one of the most powerful cities of Etruria) departed Rome after ending his war against Rome by peace treaty. Porsena split his forces, and sent part of the Clusian army with his son Aruns to wage war on the Latin city of Aricia. The Aricians sent for assistance from the Latin League, and also from the Greek city of Cumae. When support arrived, the Arician army ventured beyond the walls of the city, and the combined armies met the Clusian forces in battle. According to Livy, the Clusians initially routed the Arician forces, but the Cumaean troops allowed the Clusians to pass by, then attacked from the rear, gaining victory against the Clusians. Livy says the Clusian army was destroyed.

In 495 BC, Aricia was the site of a battle between the Aurunci and Rome, Rome being the victor.

Aricia was definitively conquered by the Romans under Caius Maenius in 338 BC, and became a civitas sine suffragio ("city without the vote"), but was soon given full rights. It received the title of municipium, and expanded towards the valley below, where the Via Appia connected it with Rome. Aricia became, therefore, the first main posting station on the overland journey from Rome towards southern Italy.

Augustus had family connections to Aricia according to Suetonius. This came from the maternal line. This was used as an insult by his enemies, most notably Mark Antony who said that his maternal great-grandfather was originally African, then owned an oil-shop followed by a bakery.

Being rather near to the Imperial capital, and favoured by a fresher climate, Aricia was chosen by many of Rome's patricii as a location for their leisure villas. It also was recognized for the calibre of its wine and foodstuffs. Martial wrote favourably of its leeks and Pliny relished a unique variety of Arician cabbages.

Because of its wealth and its strategic location near the coast, the city was sacked several times during and after the fall of the Roman Empire, by Goths, Vandals and, finally, by the Saracens who destroyed it in 827. The inhabitants subsequently moved to the ancient acropolis and founded a new community.

In 990 the Castrum Ariciensis ("Ariccia's Castle") was a dominion of Guido, count of Tusculum. During the reign of Pope Nicholas II the castle was absorbed by the Papal States, from which it, in turn, passed again to the Earls of Tusculum as a fiefdom (1116). The Roman Church regained Ariccia in 1223 with Pope Honorius III, of the Savelli family, and maintained it until the first half of the 15th century.

The population of Ariccia began to decline, however. After a period under the administration of the castle of Lariano, it passed to the Genzano district, which at that time registered only 100 residents. Around 1400 all the territory became the property of the Monastery of Sant'Anastasio alle Tre Fontane and, after a brief period under the Savelli once more, was sold to the Abbey of Grottaferrata.

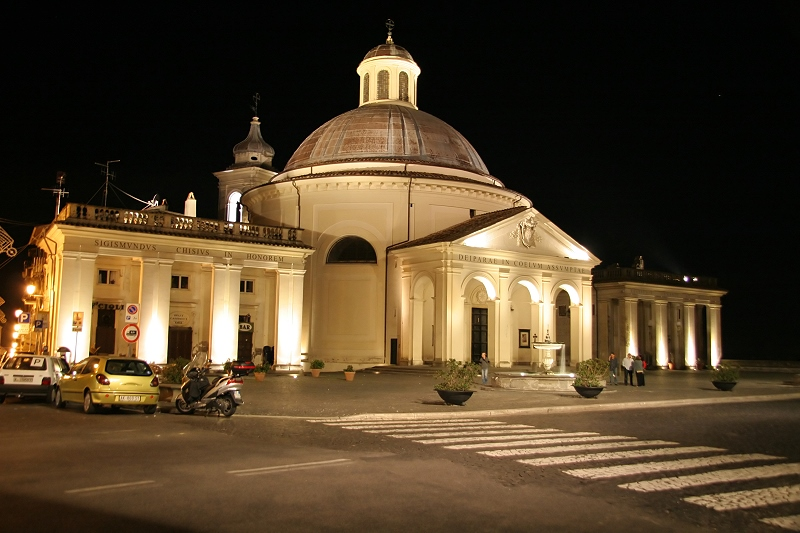
The church of Santa Maria Assunta by Gian Lorenzo Bernini.

Pope Sixtus IV handed Ariccia over to the Savelli, who executed several works to improve its condition, including the draining of the volcanic lake (Lake of Vallericcia) which lay to the west, between the hills and the sea.

Systematic archaeological excavations of the site began around this period. In 1637 Giovanni Argoli, at the request of his patron the Cardinal Lelio Biscia, writes up a description of votive objects and inscriptions found during excavations at Aricia.

In 1661 the city passed to the powerful Chigi family, who rebuilt the splendid Palazzo Savelli Chigi in the main square, in which the invaluable Chigi archives were housed. The Chigi Pope Alexander VII lived for long periods in Ariccia and drastically changed its character, with important contributions from the prominent Baroque sculptor and architect Gian Lorenzo Bernini, designer of the piazza of St Peter's Basilica in Rome. Among Bernini's rich contributions to the character of the town were the piazza and the Collegiata di Santa Maria Assunta which faces the palazzo.

In 1854 Pope Pius IX ordered the construction of a bridge. This bridge bypassed the large wood (now the Parco Chigi) in the valley, which hindered access to Ariccia from Rome along the Via Appia.

Nearly a century later, the bridge—along with much of the city—was destroyed by retreating German troops during World War II. Rebuilt in 1947, it crumbled suddenly in 1967 and was rebuilt again.

In 2015, the Roman Curia's yearly Lenten spiritual exercises were again held at Ariccia, at the Casa Divin Maestro (House of the Divine Master), from 16:00 on the First Sunday of Lent, February 22, 2015, to the morning of Friday, February 27, 2015. The 2015 exercises were to be led by Carmelite Father Bruno Secondin, on the theme from the readings of the Prophet Elijah, "Servants and prophets of the living God"; during the retreat, all audiences are suspended.

== Main sights ==
The most noteworthy sight in Ariccia is the northern entrance from the famous bridge which leads to Bernini's Baroque square. The main monuments include:

- Palazzo Savelli Chigi, whose perfectly restored rooms are renowned as a location for Luchino Visconti's The Leopard and for other historical movies and television programs, was built by Prince Augusto Chigi in 1740.
- Santa Maria Assunta, church by Bernini, whose circular dome was inspired by his restoration of the Pantheon. In the interior, the apse is a notable fresco by Borgognone.
- Fontana delle Tre Cannelle ("Fountain of the three spouts"), once thought to contain the tomb of Simon Magus.

Other monuments include the Porta Romana, also by Bernini, and, two kilometres (1 mi) outside the city, the venerated Sanctuary of the Madonna di Galloro, with facade by Bernini. The latter is the final stop of a religious procession held on 8 December and called "Procession of the Lady", as a young woman is asked to lead it.

The area around Ariccia houses many interesting archaeological finds such as the Villa of the Roman Emperor Vitellius, the remains of the Via Appia Antica, as well as those of the ancient temples on Monte Cavo and in the Lake Nemi basin.

== Culture ==
Ariccia has a long history of welcoming artists and writers who have departed from Rome's heat and bustle for the breezy hillsides and groves overlooking the Tyrrhenian Sea. Horace in one of his Satires notes that in "Escaping from great Rome, I'm welcomed in Ariccia at a reasonable inn."

The forested landscapes of Ariccia, which had given birth to the Latin-Roman cult of Diana, also had a special appeal to later writers and artists, especially those associated with Romanticism. Ariccia appears as a subject in noteworthy paintings by Jean-Baptiste-Camille Corot, George Inness, Ludwig Richter, Alexandre Calame, Friedrich Wilhelm Schirmer, Adrien Manglard, Franz Ludwig Catel, Hermann Winterhalter, Oswald Achenbach, J. M. W. Turner, Mikhail Lebedev, and Richard Wilson. Goethe visited in the 1780s, and Henrik Ibsen wrote his epic verse play Brand in Ariccia in 1865. In Italian Hours (essays collected in 1909), Henry James observed the natural beauty of Ariccia and the pleasantness of the "little piazza". Frazer's wrote The Golden Bough about the sanctuary.

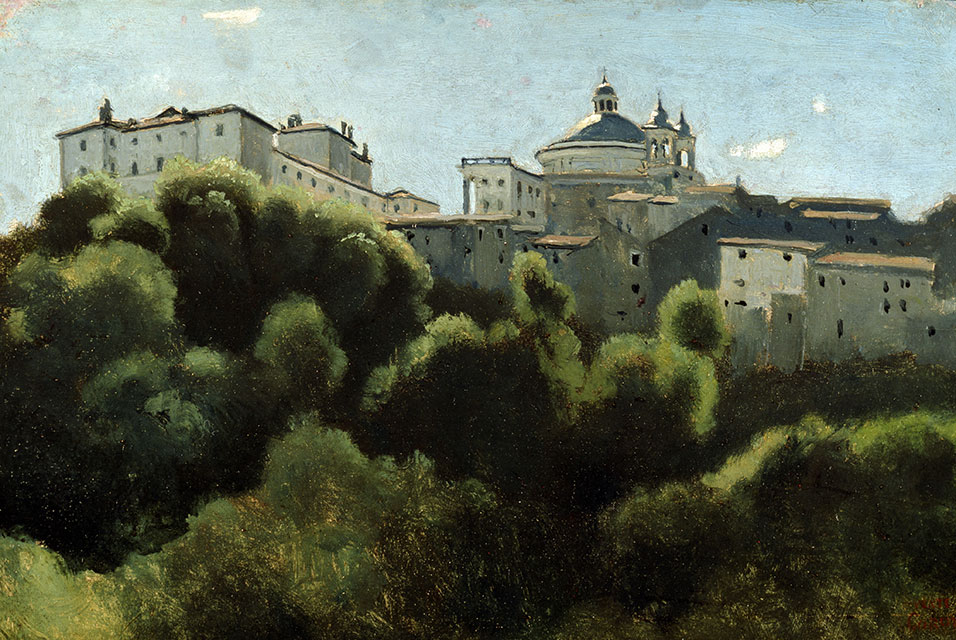
Jean-Baptiste-Camille Corot, Ariccia Palazzo Chigi, 1826–27.

The Locanda Martorelli, the hotel which faced the palace in the Piazza di Corte, was a popular stop between Rome and Naples for those on the Grand Tour, and was frequented by artists and writers such as J.M. William Turner, Corot, Henrik Ibsen, Gogol, D'Azeglio, Richter, Hans Christian Andersen, and Henry Longfellow.

Today, the Palazzo Savelli Chigi often hosts exhibitions drawing from its own extensive collections as well as visiting exhibitions. The Palace is also the site of frequent public musical performances.

Much of the city's greatest art, Roman-era sculpture excavated by archaeologists, has been distributed to the world's collections of classical artwork, so one often sees the name "Ariccia" pinned next to statues of Augustus or Diana that are being displayed far from Latium.

== Education ==
Ariccia is home to Auburn University's only international campus, the Joseph S. Bruno Auburn Abroad in Italy program, which is housed in the Palazzo Savelli Chigi. This year-round program is sponsored by the Auburn University College of Human Sciences and is open to students from any major on the Auburn campus.

== Transportation ==
Public transportation is provided by the region's COTRAL bus lines, with regular bus connections to and from Rome. There is a nearby train service directly to Roma Termini from Albano Laziale, approximately two kilometres (1 mi) from Ariccia's main piazza.

== Twin towns ==
- Cournon-d'Auvergne, France
- Lichtenfels, Germany
- (Scotland) Prestwick, United Kingdom
