= Sanctuary of Santa Maria di Galloro, Ariccia =

Church in Lazio, Italy

Coordinates: 41°43′6.0″N 12°40′43.6″E

The Sanctuary of Santa Maria di Galloro is a church located on the via Appia Nuova, near Ariccia on the road to Genzano di Roma, in the region of Lazio, in Italy.

== History ==
The cult of the Madonna di Galloro, a Madonna delle Grazie, began with the discovery of an image of the Virgin and child painted on a rock in a valley between Monte Cucco and Colle Pardo. The Pope Urban VIII Barberini patronized this popular devotion, and this led to the erection of the sanctuary between 1624 and 1633. It was placed under the feudal control of Benedictine monks of the Vallumbrosan Order, who built an adjacent monastery (1632-1634) under designs of Fra Michele da Bergamo. Between 1661 and 1663, Pope Alexander VII Chigi, whose family had a nearby palace and lands, commissioned a further reconstruction and a facade from Gian Lorenzo Bernini. In 1656, an annual (December 8) procession of the Signorina was institutionalized to celebrate the end of a plague epidemic.

Vacated of monks during the Napoleonic occupation, ultimately the monastery passed to the Jesuit order from 1816 till 1896, and after a few decades of Vallombrosian restoration, again came to be property of the Jesuits who own it today, and utilize it for religious retreats.

== Interior and chapels ==
The interior decoration is not due to Bernini, but was mainly a product of commissions by the Vallombrosians monks, and some by the Jesuits in the 1920-1930s.

- First chapel on right: dedicated to St Francis of Sales, canonized by Pope Alexander VII in 1665. The chapel and altar architecture were designed by Bernini. The altarpiece depicts St Francis of Sales preaches to the Swiss (1663) by Guglielmo Cortese, known as “Il Borgognone”.
- Second chapel on right: dedicated formerly to St Francis of Assisi, but now to St Ignatius of Loyola, the altarpiece is a 19th-century canvas of a Glory of the Saint with the Sanctuary. Other paintings celebrate Vallembrosani and Jesuit saints, including St John Berchmans, canonized by Pope Leo XIII in 1888.
- Third chapel on right was dedicated formerly to Sant'Accasio, but now devoted to the Holy Heart of Jesus. The altarpiece is by A. Mariani.
- Right transept (Savelli) chapel: commissioned by mercenary duke Federico Savelli after his 1638 release from prison, and completed by his grandson. Savelli had become a prisoner at the Battle of Breitenfeld (1631). The angel heads are attributed to François Duquesnoy. The altarpiece, depicting a Holy family with St Francis of Assisi, is attributed to a 17th-century follower of il Ortolano. A St Louis Gonzaga on the wall was painted by E. Bottoni in 1890.
- First chapel on left: dedicated to St Thomas of Villanova, canonized in 1658 by Pope Alexander VII. The chapel was designed by Bernini, and the altarpiece of the Saint fighting Heresy (1663) was painted by Giacinto Gimignani.
- Second chapel on left: dedicated to St Anthony of Padua. The main altarpiece is a 17th-century depiction of the Saint and the Jesus Child.
- Third chapel on left: dedicated formerly to the Pietà, and is now dedicated to St Joseph. The altarpiece was painted in the 19th century by A. Mariani.

The cupola, damaged by earthquakes in 1893 and 1899, was frescoed in 1899 by Arturo Gatti. The spandrels were frescoed in the 17th century and depict Saints from the Vallombrosan order: the founder Giovanni Gualberto, Bernard bishop of Parma, Cardinal Tesauro Beccaria, and Pietro Igneo bishop of Albano.

The presbytery has a tempietto or small temple (1633), attributed to Bernini and commissioned by Cardinal Emmanuele Pio of Savoy, bishop of Albano. The icon of the Madonna di Galloro is ornamented by a gold crown donated by Pope Pius VII in 1816 and three roses donated by Charles the IV of Spain in 1817. An elaborate polychrome marble and precious stone mosaic altar was commissioned in 1867 by cardinal Giacomo Antonelli and Duke Grazioli. The relics of St Clement under the altar were donated by Pope Clement XI in 1716. The stucco statues flanking the entrance to the choir depict St Giovanni Gualberto and San Benedetto of Parma and were sculpted in 1751 by Tomaso Solaci. The ceiling was frescoed in 1910 by Emanuele Sciotti.
