= Basilica of San Barnaba =

Church in Marino, Italy

- Basilica collegiata di San Barnaba apostolo
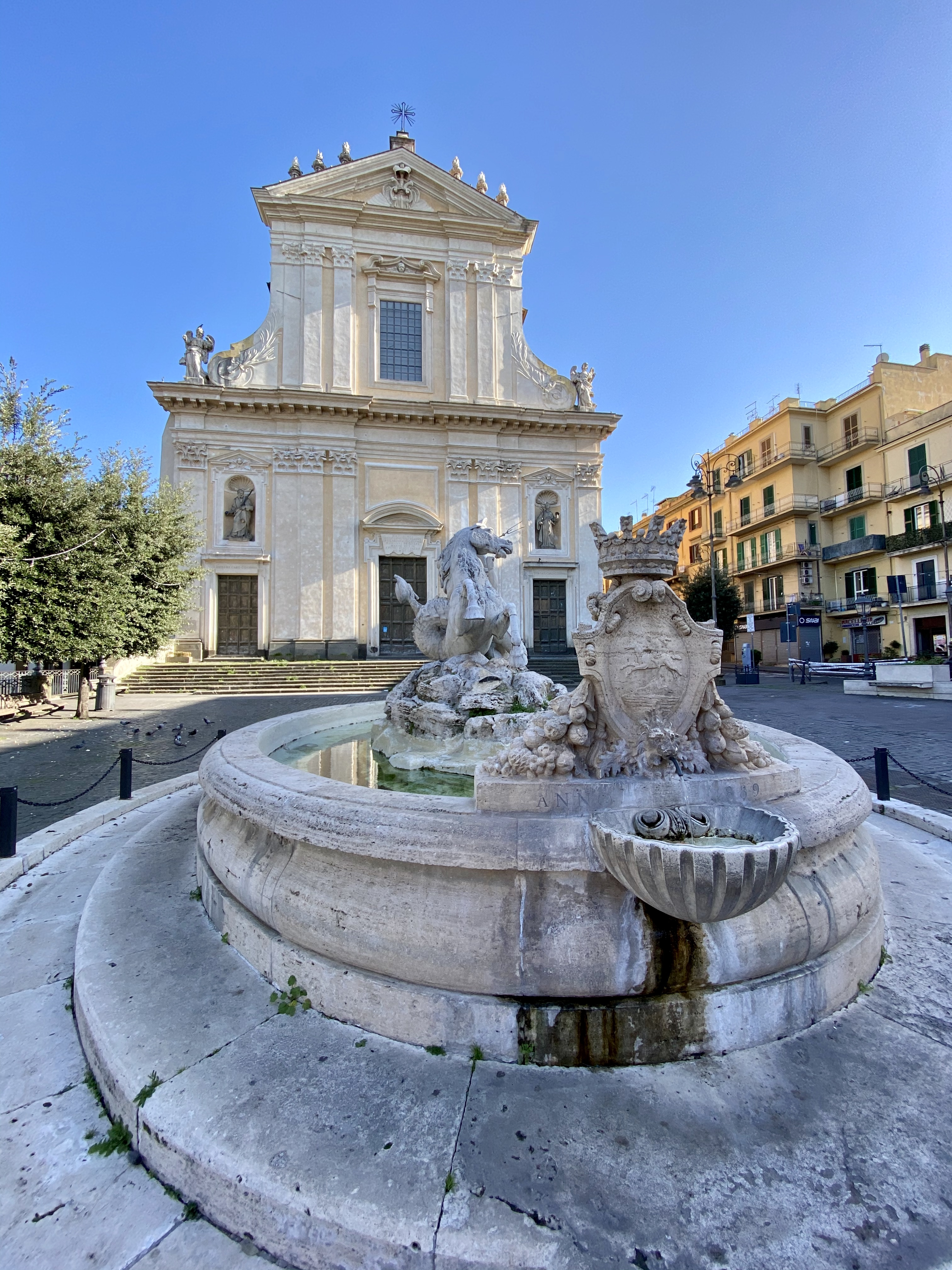
- The main facade and the Triton fountain in St. Barnabas Square

- 41.769975°N 12.659775°E
- Location: Marino
- Denomination: Catholic

History
- Consecrated: 1714

Architecture
- Architect: Antonio Del Grande
- Style: Baroque
- Groundbreaking: 1640
- Completed: 1662

Administration
- Diocese: Diocese of Albano

The collegiate basilica of St. Barnabas (Note: Actually, the full title is Perinsigne Basilica Collegiata a dignità abbaziale con Capitolo Mitrato di San Barnaba Apostolo in Marino. Ugo Onorati, San Barnaba Apostolo nella storia e nelle tradizioni di Marino, Marino, Tipografica Renzo Palozzi, 2004.) is the main place of Catholic worship in the city of Marino, in the metropolitan city of Rome Capital and suburbicarian diocese of Albano.

The basilica, built out of the devotion of the Colonna family, is one of the largest churches in the diocese, as well as one of the most important: it was the seat of the venerable archconfraternity of the Gonfalone of Marino, founded around 1271 by Bonaventure of Bagnoregio; moreover, the chapter of St. Barnabas was the most important in the diocese along with that of the collegiate church of Santa Maria Assunta in Ariccia, as was established in the diocesan synods of 1668 and 1687.

== History ==
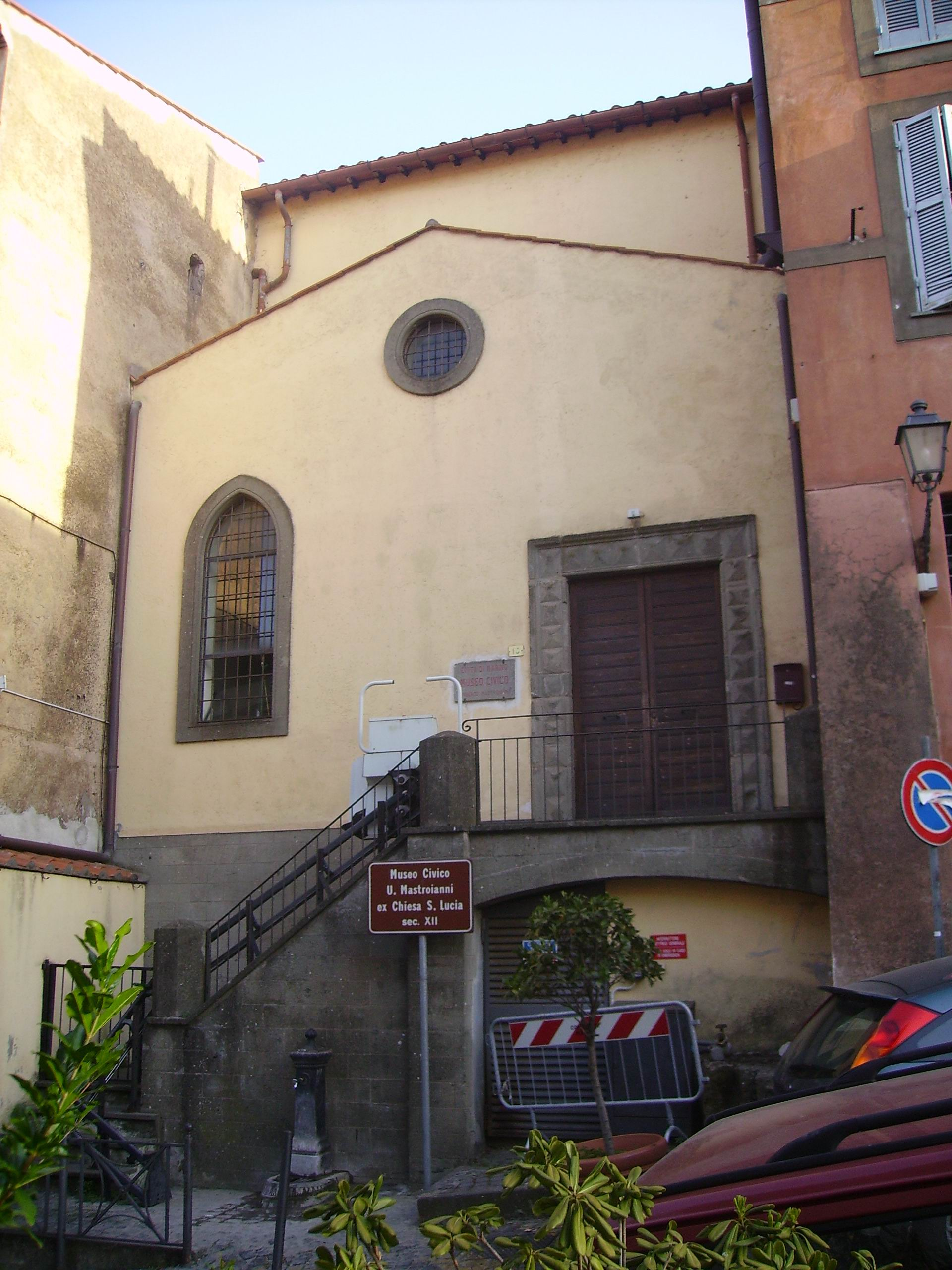
The entrance to the Umberto Mastroianni Civic Museum, in what was once the left aisle of the church of Santa Lucia

=== Legend of St. Barnabas ===
Originally the patron saint of Marino was Saint Lucy, whose feast day is still celebrated in the town on December 13 each year.

A church was dedicated to St. Lucy, located in the lower-medieval part of the town, and erected probably in the 12th century on a Roman cistern, but rebuilt in the early 13th century at the behest of Jacoba of Settesoli. Part of this church, the only example of Gothic architecture in the Roman Castles, houses the Umberto Mastroianni Civic Museum.

St. Barnabas would become the patron saint of Marino following a natural calamity that struck the Marinese countryside: on June 11, 1615, a violent hailstorm devastated the crops of the people of Marino. The following year another hailstorm, on the same day, fell on the Marinese countryside. Finally, in 1617 a third hailstorm ravaged the local fields and vineyards again on June 11. In order to put an end to this scourge, a plenary popular assembly was convened on February 2, 1618, which voted to write a letter to Cardinal Francesco Sforza, cardinal bishop of Albano, asking to be allowed to venerate St. Barnabas, whose feast day falls precisely on June 11, as patron saint "appended to His Divine Majesty." (Note: Ugo Onorati reports the text of the letter: The Community of Marino, most humble orator of Your Most Venerable Reverence, hereby expounds that since Saint Barnabas has been elected Patron Protector under His Divine Majesty, and by ex voto; the feast of the said Saint is to be observed. And therefore we beg that you deign to grant us the right to observe the said feast.) On June 4, 1619, Cardinal Sforza responded affirmatively, (Note: Ugo Onorati (cited work) reports the text of the rescript: Concedimus ut petitur iuxta decretum expediendum, Romae, 4 junii 1619, Sfortia Cardinalis Ep.us Alban…) and from that date the feast of St. Barnabas began to be solemnly celebrated.

=== Foundation ===
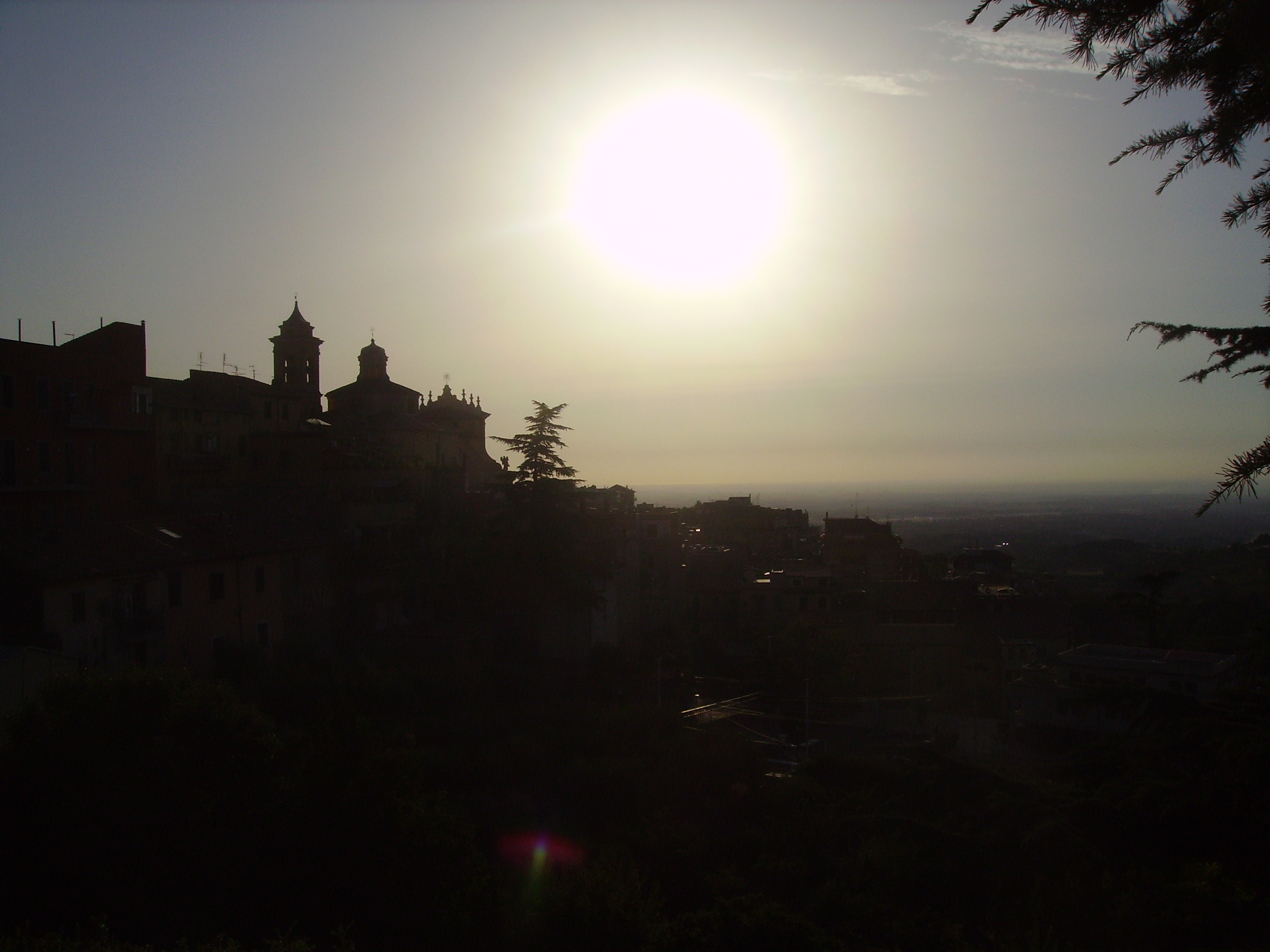
The basilica as seen from Heroes Square at sunset

At the beginning of the 17th century Marino was divided into two parishes: the aforementioned parish of St. Lucy and the parish of St. John the Baptist, the parish church of which was located in what is now the Castelletto district, that is, in the early medieval part of the town, and of which only a few remains remain encompassed by houses. The latter parish was the oldest. Then the duke of Marino Filippo I Colonna and his son, Cardinal Girolamo Colonna, opted for the dissolution of the two parishes and the unification of them into a single parish title whose church was dedicated to St. Barnabas. This choice, endorsed by the ecclesiastical authority, was also inspired by reasons of public reason, since it seems that quarrels and fights were constantly breaking out between the residents of the two parishes.

Thus, on Oct. 28, 1636, Monsignor Giovanni Battista Altieri, vicar general of the suburbicarian see of Albano, by an act of visitation abolished the two Marinese parishes of Santa Lucia and San Giovanni Battista, amalgamating their rents and benefices into the constituting parish of San Barnaba. Duke Filippo I Colonna immediately allocated some funds to start the construction work, from which, however, the official treasurers of the Community of Marino drew, committing an almost sacrilegious crime, taking advantage of that money to "stroll to the taverns" of Rome. Despite the theft, the foundation stone of the new parish church was solemnly laid on June 10, 1640 with the blessing of Cardinal Girolamo Colonna and in the presence of Duke Filippo I Colonna and other members of the Colonna household.

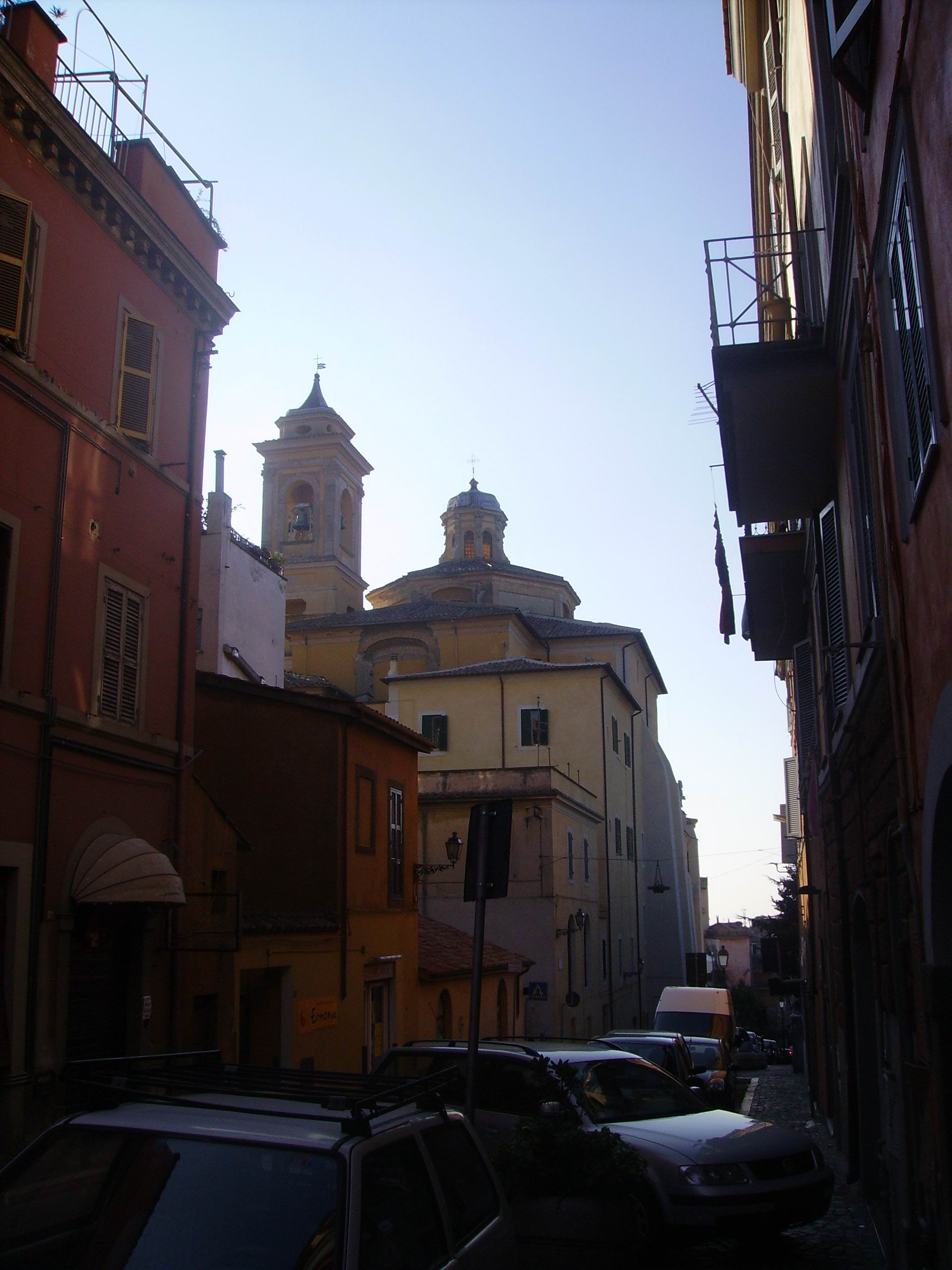
The left flank of the basilica from Via Giuseppe Garibaldi

Pope Urban VIII on December 3, 1643 issued the bull Exclesa merita Sanctorum, by which he not only confirmed the suppression of the two ancient Marinese parishes in favor of the new parish church under construction, but also elevated the latter to the title of perinsigne collegiate church and to the nullius abbey dignity, thus endowed with a chapter of twelve canons plus six benefactors with the right to the choral habit presided over by an archpriest abbot parish priest with the privilege of cappa magna: the archpriest abbot parish priest was also to be assisted by two "perpetual coadjutors" for the care of the souls of the parishioners. The privileges of canons and abbot parish priest were expanded in the following centuries by the Pontiffs: in 1748 Pope Benedict XIV granted the abbot parish priest the use of the pontifical habit and the canons the use of the rochet and the purple mozzetta; on August 12, 1828, on the other hand, Pope Leo XII authorized the canons to wear the cappa magna, as a reward for the fidelity of the Marinese clergy to the Holy See during the events of the French occupation; (Note: Moroni 1847, volume XLII, p. 41 quotes from the Breve of Leo XII the reason for granting the cappa magna: Ob eorum in adversis retroactorum temporum vicissitudinibus erga ipsum et Sedem Apostolicam probatam fidelitatem ac devotionem.) finally, on November 17, 1843, Pope Gregory XVI granted both the abbot parish priest and the canons the use of the silk purple collar.

On June 5, 1642 the chamberlain's officer of the feud of Marino informed Duke Filippo I Colonna that all the pillars of the erected church and the vaults of the eight chapels had been put in place. Some measurements of the building: length to the facade, 58.75 meters; width to the transept, 24 meters; height of the dome to the lantern, 36 meters. Up to that date 12,000 scudi had been spent on the construction, and as many scudi would be spent later, until 1655, totaling about 30,000 scudi. (Note: Just to make a few comparisons with some more or less contemporary churches in the Roman Castles, the Cathedral of St. Peter of Frascati, erected between 1599 and 1636, cost the local community and the suburbicarian see of Frascati a total of just under 40,000 scudi given the following dimensions: length 42.30 meters; width of the facade 34.10 meters; height to the roof 21.80 meters. The Collegiate Church of the Assumption in Ariccia, on the other hand, erected between 1661 and 1665, cost Cardinal Flavio Chigi and his brother Agostino 84,000 scudi for a simple circular plan surmounted by the famous dome, designed by Gian Lorenzo Bernini.)

Work on the church, which lasted fifteen years, was supposedly completed in 1655: however, the consecration of the place of worship could not proceed due to the devastating plague that afflicted Marino and the Ager Romanus in 1656. The plague exterminated many of the people of Marino, leaving the fiefdom devastated, which had to be repopulated with vassals of the Colonna house from Abruzzo: the population of Marino, estimated before the plagues at about 2,000 inhabitants, was reduced in a few months to a few hundred people.

=== 17th century ===
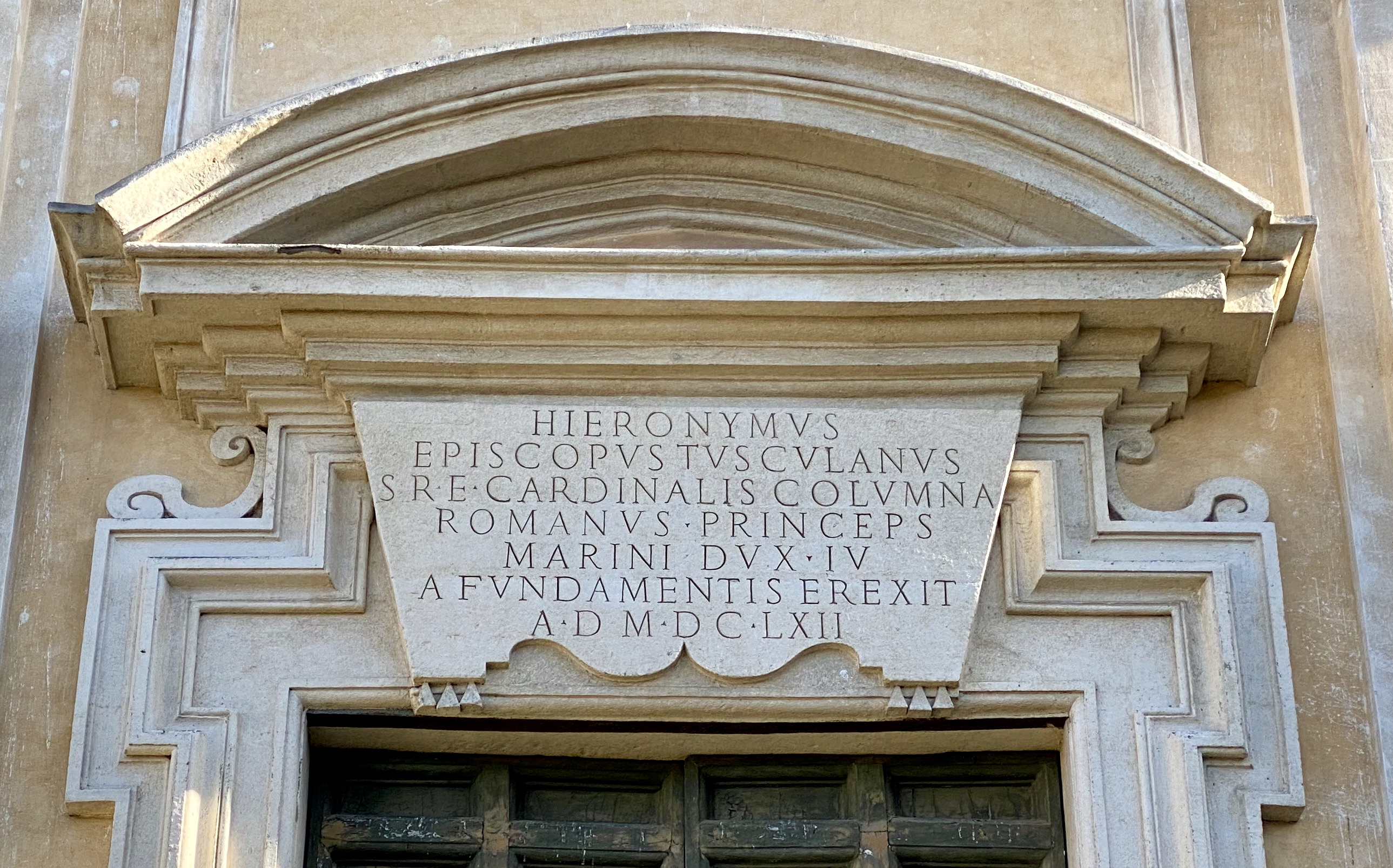
The plaque celebrating the foundation of the basilica, placed above the main door on St. Barnabas Square

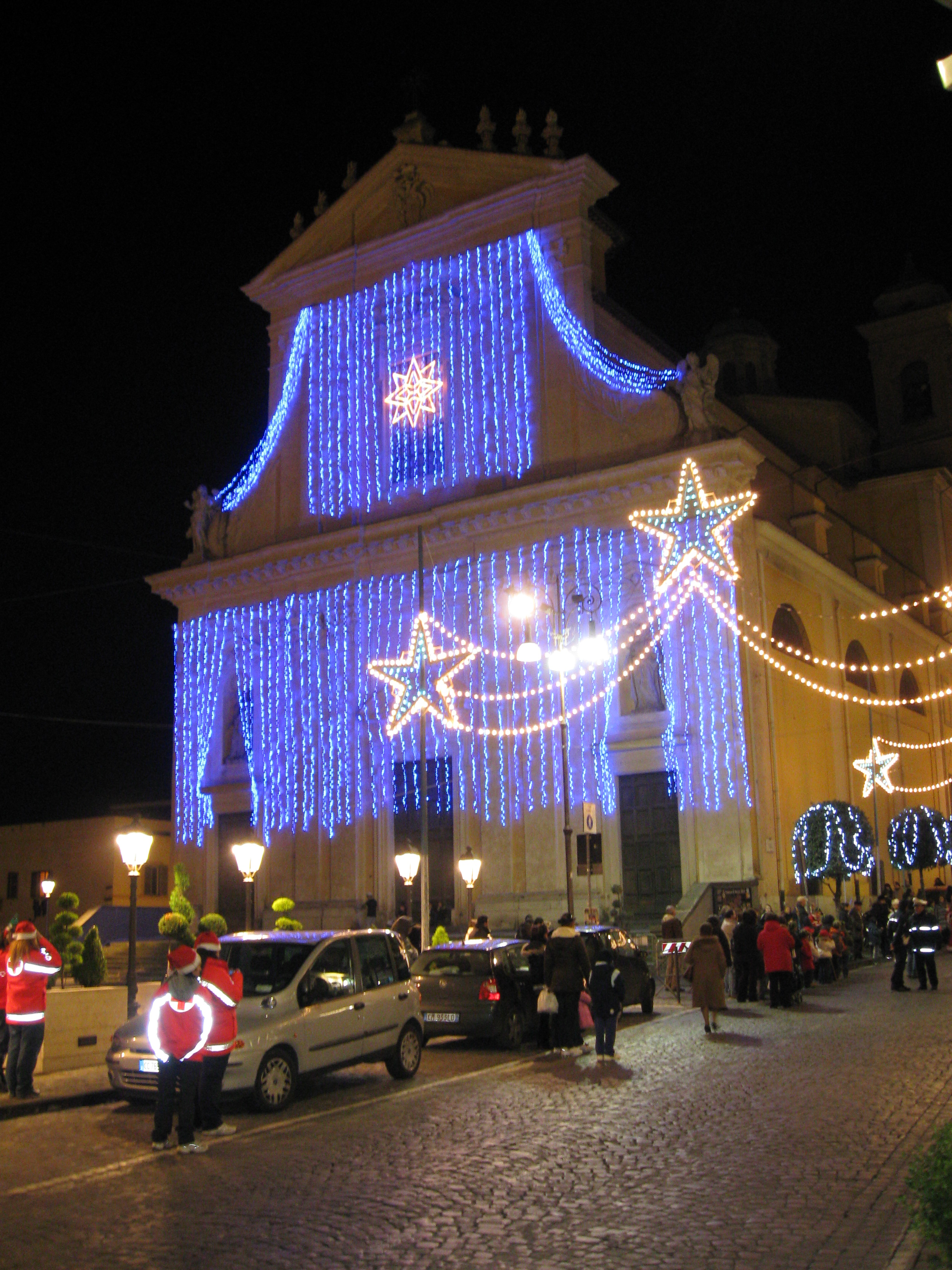
The facade of the basilica on St. Barnabas Square during Christmas 2008

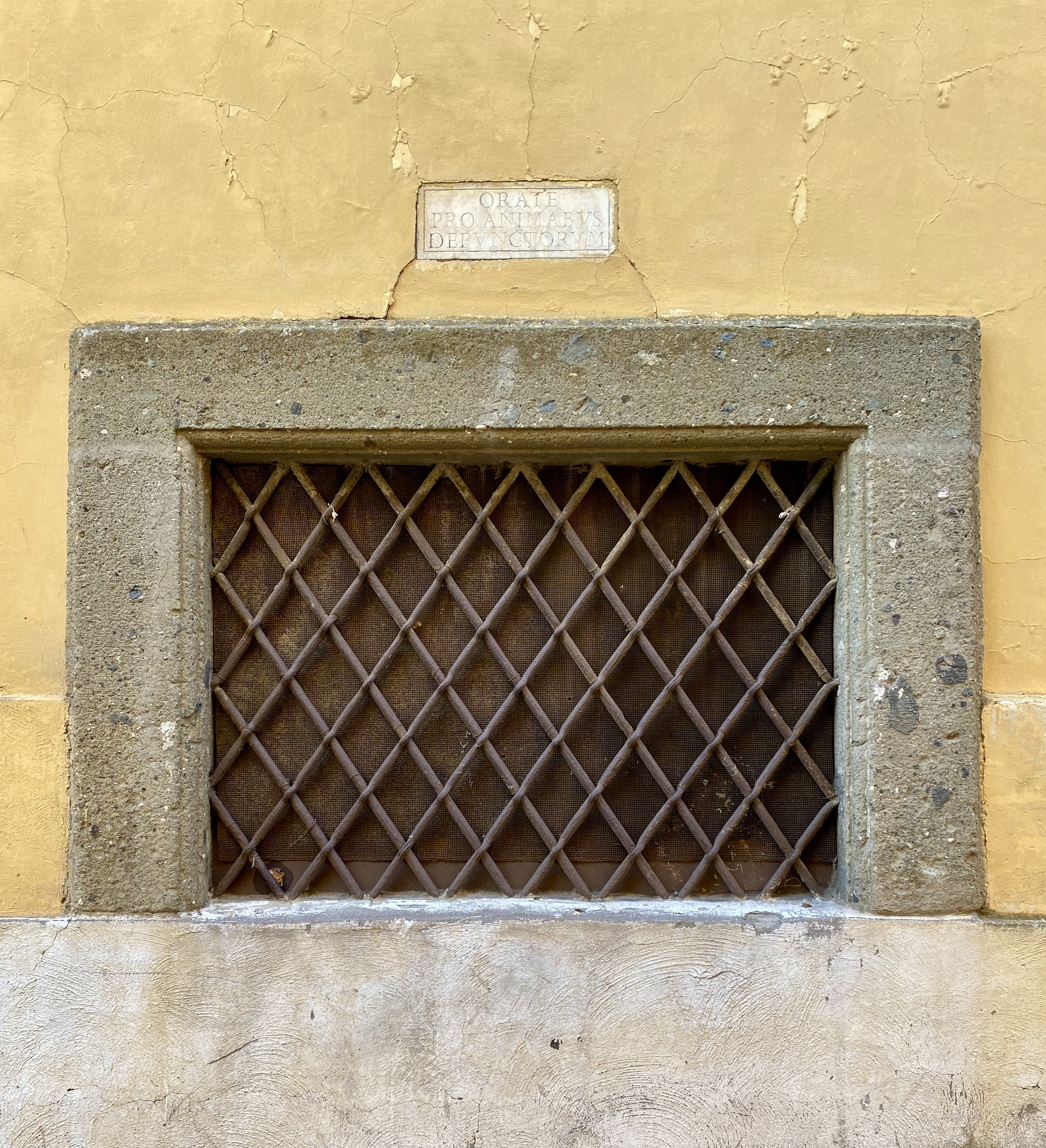
The large window of the former cemetery, in Corso Trieste, located below the basilica

The first sung mass was celebrated in the new Collegiate Church only on October 22, 1662, by Monsignor Carlo Tarugi, vicar general of the suburbicarian see of Albano and the first abbot parish priest, Don Agostino Gagliardi. In fact, the plaque affixed by Cardinal Girolamo Colonna on the counterfacade dates from that date, recalling how the church is under the perpetual iuspatronatus of the Colonna family. However, the official consecration of the Collegiate Church was celebrated only on May 14, 1713 by the archbishop of Naples Monsignor Antonio Sanfelice.

On December 10, 1662, the image of Our Lady of the Rosary nuncupatam de Populo was moved from the old church of Santa Lucia to the new collegiate church.

=== 18th century ===
After the events of the Roman Republic (1798-1799), in which Marino had actively participated, (Note: See French Revolution in the Roman Castles and Velletri. (Italian)) in 1799 the Neapolitan liberation troops encamped in the Roman Castles and also in Marino, celebrating a solemn mass in suffrage of their fallen precisely in the Collegiate Church of St. Barnabas.

=== 19th century ===
The elevation to a minor basilica dates back to 1851, at the behest of Pope Pius IX, without prejudice to the city's aggregation to the suburbicarian see of Albano, which had already been confirmed by Gregory XVI when he elevated Marino to the rank of city in 1835.

After 1870 in Marino the anti-clericalism of the majority republican part of the population erupted, which fiercely opposed the parish community with events such as the Carnevalone. In 1899 the then abbot parish priest thus also wanted to show his hostility toward the republicans and toward unified Italy itself by forbidding the entry of the Italian flag into the basilica, on the occasion of a mass in suffrage for those who died in the battle of Adwa.

=== 20th century ===
==== From the turn of the century to World War II ====
The 1902 earthquake caused some deep cracks in the basilica's structure, so the civil engineers of Rome in 1909 completed some much-needed consolidation work by reinforcing the architraves of the two side aisles with round arches, strengthening the pillars and renovating the floor and plaster.

In the early twentieth century, the parish was ruled by abbot parish priest Attilio Pandozzi, a priest openly aligned with the strong anti-clerical majority, who went so far as to write a pamphlet against the Catholic Church and the Pope; therefore, he was suspended a divinis and removed from the parish. The cardinal bishop of the suburbicarian diocese of Albano Antonio Agliardi, in order to rebuild a "disheartened and scattered" community after the parenthesis of the "unfortunate apostate parish priest," chose Fr. Guglielmo Grassi (1868-1954), a priest originally from Genzano di Roma, who would remain at the head of the parish until his death in 1954. In 1937 he would be appointed bishop of Damietta by Pope Pius XII, however, he would continue his work as pastor in Marino. Monsignor Grassi is credited with the founding of the congregation of the Little Disciples of Jesus, the creation of a kindergarten for parents in need during World War I, the opening of the Vittoria Colonna hall-theater, the encouragement of theatrical activity, the founding of the St. Barnabas Parish Oratory in the 1920s, the fruitful collaboration with the Servant of God Zaccaria Negroni that led to the growth of the parish oratory and the founding of the congregation of the Little Disciples of Jesus and the St. Lucy Printing House.

On the night of Friday, Nov. 17, and Saturday, Nov. 18, 1911, the venerated image of Our Lady of the People kept in the second chapel on the right side of the basilica was subjected to a sacrilegious theft: thieves entered through a small side door in the choir and took away much of the most precious ornaments and votive offerings. The perpetrators of the theft were identified almost immediately as three anarchists: two Marinese, Tullo Ostilio Ciaglia and Enrico Testa, and an outsider, Proietti Giovanni. They were sentenced to three years in prison. A second sacrilegious theft occurred a few years later, in 1914, and the thieves penetrated the basilica again through the same little door, which had been left unattended due to "the insipience of the Clergy." The valuables that had survived the first robbery were stolen: the perpetrators were not identified this time.

During World War II, on February 2, 1944 at about 12:30 p.m., a number of North American B-25 Mitchell bombers of the 15th United States Army Air Forces, weighing 1360 kilograms of bombs each, bombed the historic center of Marino. On this occasion, the basilica was spared; numerous evacuees took refuge in the basilica's basement, in the Vittoria Colonna hall-theater and in the church of the Coroncina, at which some municipal offices were also located, without a seat after the bombing of Palazzo Colonna. At the Coroncina were also located the post office and the San Barnaba Cooperative Credit Bank, and at one time also a food warehouse.

On May 31, 1944, four Anglo-American air raids hit the basilica: the roof -already falling in- and an arch supporting the dome were broken through, causing severe damage to the paintings in the interior.

==== From World War II to the end of the century ====
The first restoration work to the bombed basilica was urgently resolved by the pro tempore municipal administration as early as August 1944. The broken arch that supported the dome was reconstructed and the two paintings of the Martyrdom of St. Barnabas attributed to Bartolomeo Gennari preserved on the back wall of the presbytery and the Martyrdom of St. Bartholomew by Guercino preserved in the left transept were restored. The icon of the Madonna del Popolo was also restored: the restoration was carried out by Professor Giuseppe Grassi, brother of the abbot parish priest Guglielmo Grassi, completely free of charge, while it would have cost over £80,000. On August 25, 1948, Our Lady of the People triumphantly returned to her altar. On Feb. 2, 1948, the City of Marino inaugurated the four travertine steles placed in the altar of the Crucifix and Our Lady of Sorrows -second bay to the left- on which are inscribed the names of the 325 Marinese who fell in the Second World War.

In 1950, the cardinal bishop of the suburbicarian diocese of Albano Giuseppe Pizzardo appointed Fr. Giovanni Eleuterio Lovrovich perpetual coadjutor vicar to the abbot parish priest Guglielmo Grassi with right of succession. Fr. Giovanni, a native of Šibenik in Dalmatia who fled from there because of Yugoslav persecution of Italians, succeeded Monsignor Grassi upon the latter's death on Sept. 14, 1954: he remained parish priest until 1989. He was actively engaged -along with the Servant of God Zaccaria Negroni, who had become a Christian Democrat senator- in the expansion of the San Barnaba Parish Oratory, which under his pastoral management came to look as it does today; he was the author of historical works, such as a valuable monograph on Jacoba of Settesoli (1976) and the important work of local historiography Lo vedi ecco Marino, written together with Franco Negroni (1981). Under him the Monsignor Guglielmo Grassi auditorium was inaugurated on the premises of the former Coroncina church, and theatrical activity was given a strong and positive boost.

On August 31, 1962, Pope John XXIII made a surprise visit to Marino, coming from the Papal Palace in Castel Gandolfo to visit Monsignor Alberto Canestri, his fellow student and resident of Marino. The Pope withdrew in prayer to the basilica for a few minutes: this was the last papal visit received by the city of Marino.

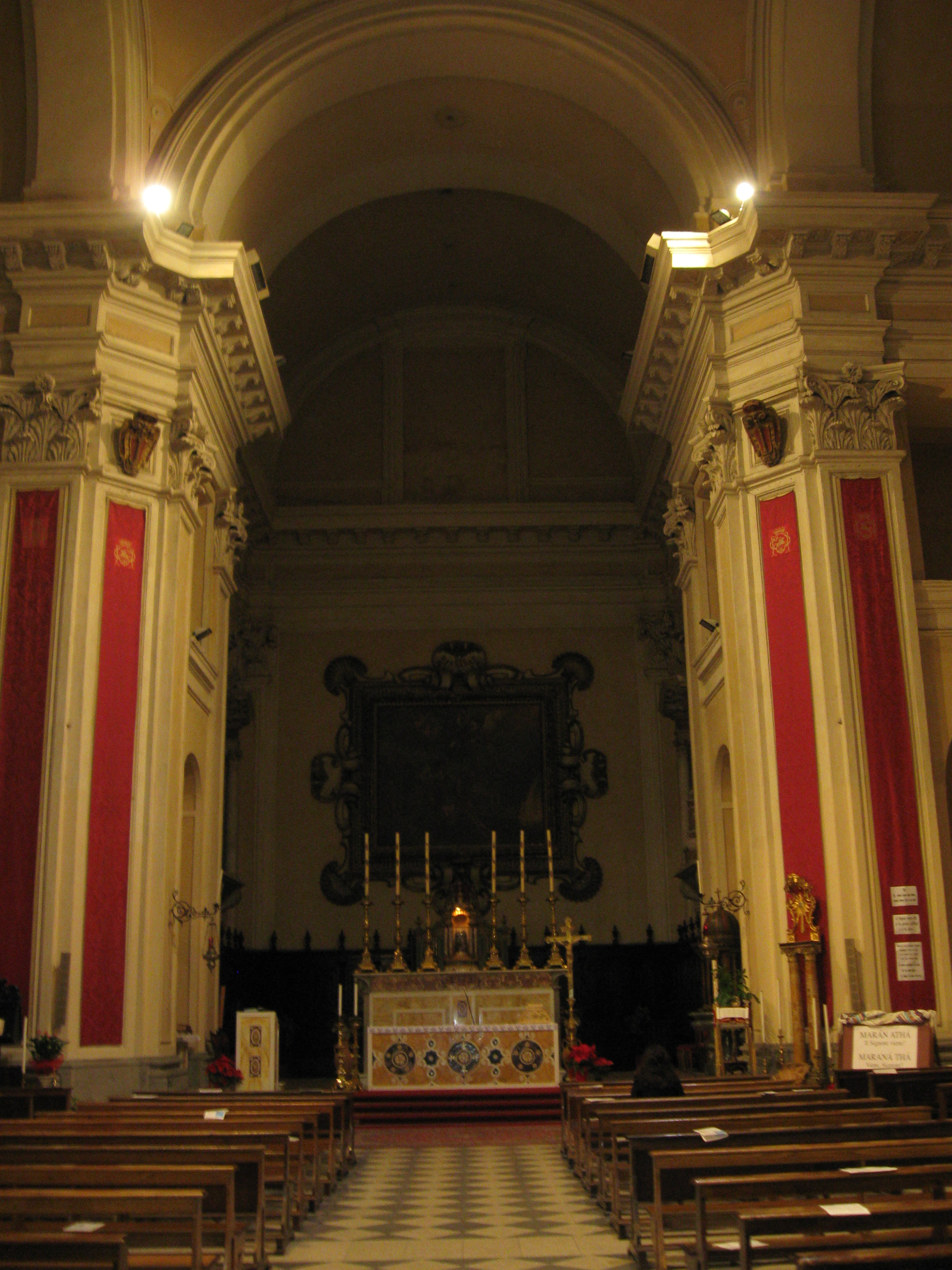
The interior of the basilica in December 2008

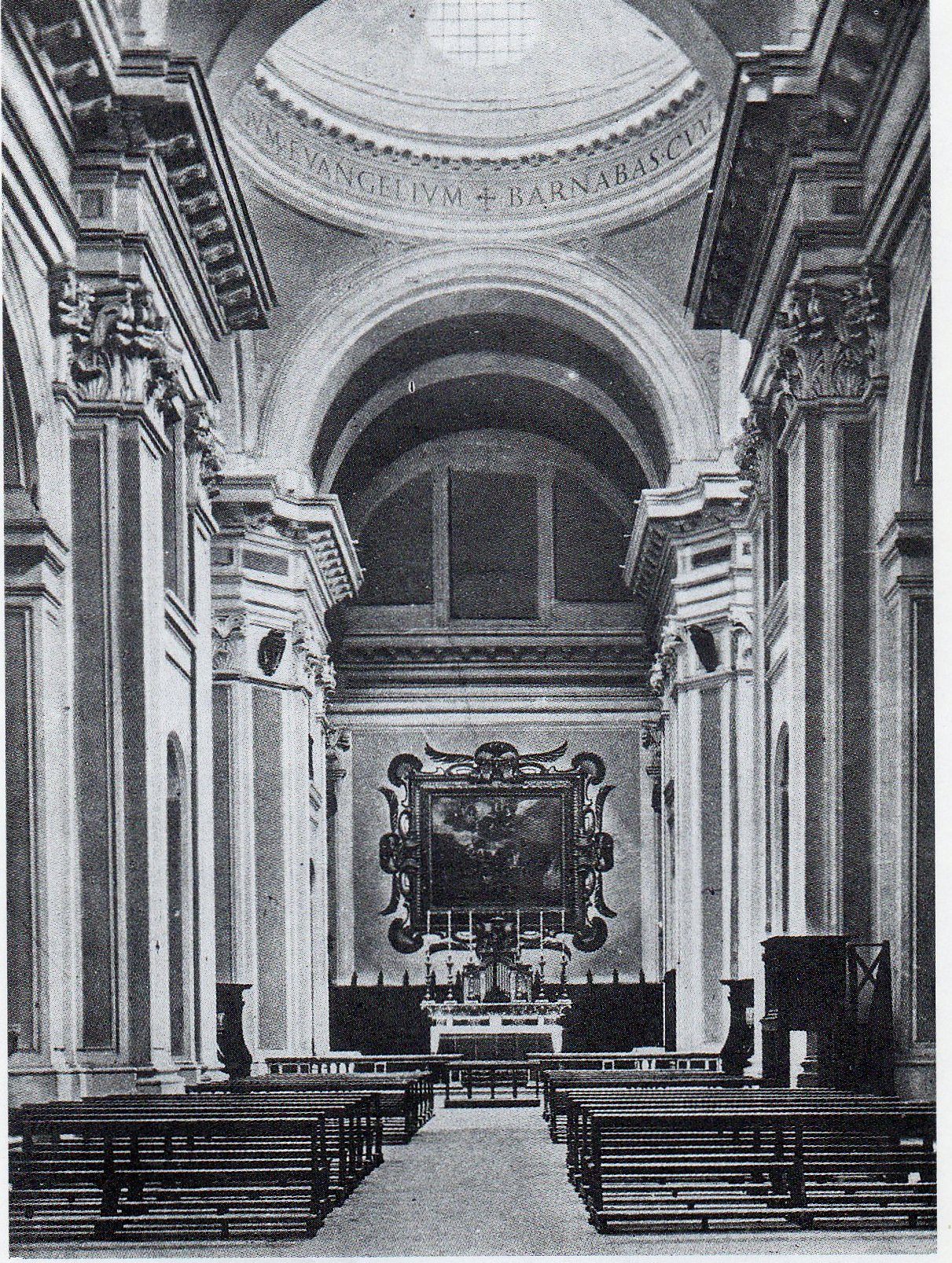
The interior of the basilica in the 1930s

In 1962, the Episcopal Curia sponsored a series of works of arrangement and renovation of the side chapels: the aforementioned altar of the Crucifix and of Our Lady of Sorrows, the altar of the Sacred Heart -third bay on the left-, enriched with a painting depicting the late abbot parish priest Guglielmo Grassi leading the people to the Sacred Heart of Jesus Christ, were rearranged, and the crypt -first bay on the right-, where the Servant of God Barbara Costantini, Monsignor Guglielmo Grassi and the vicar general of the suburbicarian diocese of Albano Giovanni Battista Trovalusci were buried. In 1970 the gilded wooden statue of St. Lucy, kept in the first bay on the left and exposed to adoration for Dec. 13, was restored. Between 1978 and 1979 major work was done in the basilica, especially in the area of the presbytery, which was brought up to standard according to the new provisions of the Second Vatican Council.

Unfortunately, during the 1980s the basilica was the object of at least three sacrilegious thefts: the icon of Our Lady of the People -the one that is worshipped is a modern copy-, the silver reliquary of the arm of St. Barnabas and a Bernini-style crucifix disappeared. There is no information about the fate of these objects.

After Monsignor Giovanni Lovrovich left the parish, Fr. Elio Abri was called to lead the parish in 1989. Then, in 1997 Bishop Dante Bernini of Albano entrusted the parish to Fr Aldo Anfuso, previously founder of St. Boniface Parish in Pomezia. Under Fr. Aldo's pastoral leadership, the educational activity given by the St. Barnabas Parish Oratory regained vigor, the Monsignor Guglielmo Grassi auditorium was restored with a resumption of the theatrical activity that had been so important in Marino, and the groundwork was laid for the restoration of the adjacent Vittoria Colonna hall-theater.

In the 1990s major restoration work was conducted on the main facade of the basilica; in 2006 the plaster of the monumental eastern wall, on Via Giuseppe Garibaldi, was completely refreshed.

=== 21st century ===
On Sept. 30, 2008, Monsignor Aldo Anfuso, who was transferred to lead the parish of the collegiate church of Santa Maria Assunta and the sanctuary of Santa Maria di Galloro in Ariccia after eleven years of pastoral work in Marino, was officially greeted with a Holy Mass in the basilica. On Oct. 6, Monsignor Pietro Massari, the parish priest of Ariccia, took his place and was officially invested with the leadership of the parish by Bishop of Albano Monsignor Marcello Semeraro on Dec. 8, 2008.

On Dec. 11, 2008, a delegation of Sierra Leonean dignitaries, consisting of Makeni Bishop Monsignor Giorgio Biguzzi, Makeni Mayor Alhaji Andrew Kanu, and the president of the Northern Province as well as minister of Internal Affairs of the current government was received in the basilica, after a reception at Palazzo Colonna by the civil authority, by the newly installed abbot parish priest of the Basilica of San Barnaba Monsignor Pietro Massari, who is in charge of the mission of the Suburbicarian Diocese of Albano in the territory of the Diocese of Makeni.

== Description ==
The village church remembers, though larger, our churches of the Lombardy countryside: but a firm vein of beauty pervades its bulk [...] Inside, there is no awe: ahead of the high altar, in the Epistle horn, the statue of the Virgin, familiarly dear, haloed and gilded, on the processional sedan-chair: it will advance among the people: "Progreditur quasi aurora consurgens." In the Evangel horn, the showcase with the shield of Lepanto: Marcantonio Colonna must have had some Marinese around, "Scutum ex Turcarum spoliis reportatum," because the shield is rather half than one.

— Carlo Emilio Gadda, La festa dell'uva a Marino, in Il castello di Udine (1934), pp. 145–146.

The interior of the basilica, as spacious and unadorned as it is well-proportioned, was designed by Antonio Del Grande, a trusted architect of the Colonna family, who also worked on the parish church of Santa Maria Assunta in Rocca di Papa and the Palazzo Colonna in Rome. The builders engaged in the construction were Giovanni Maria Longhi, Vincenzo della Greca and Paolo Andreotti, with Fabrizio Vannutelli supervising the work.

=== Exterior ===
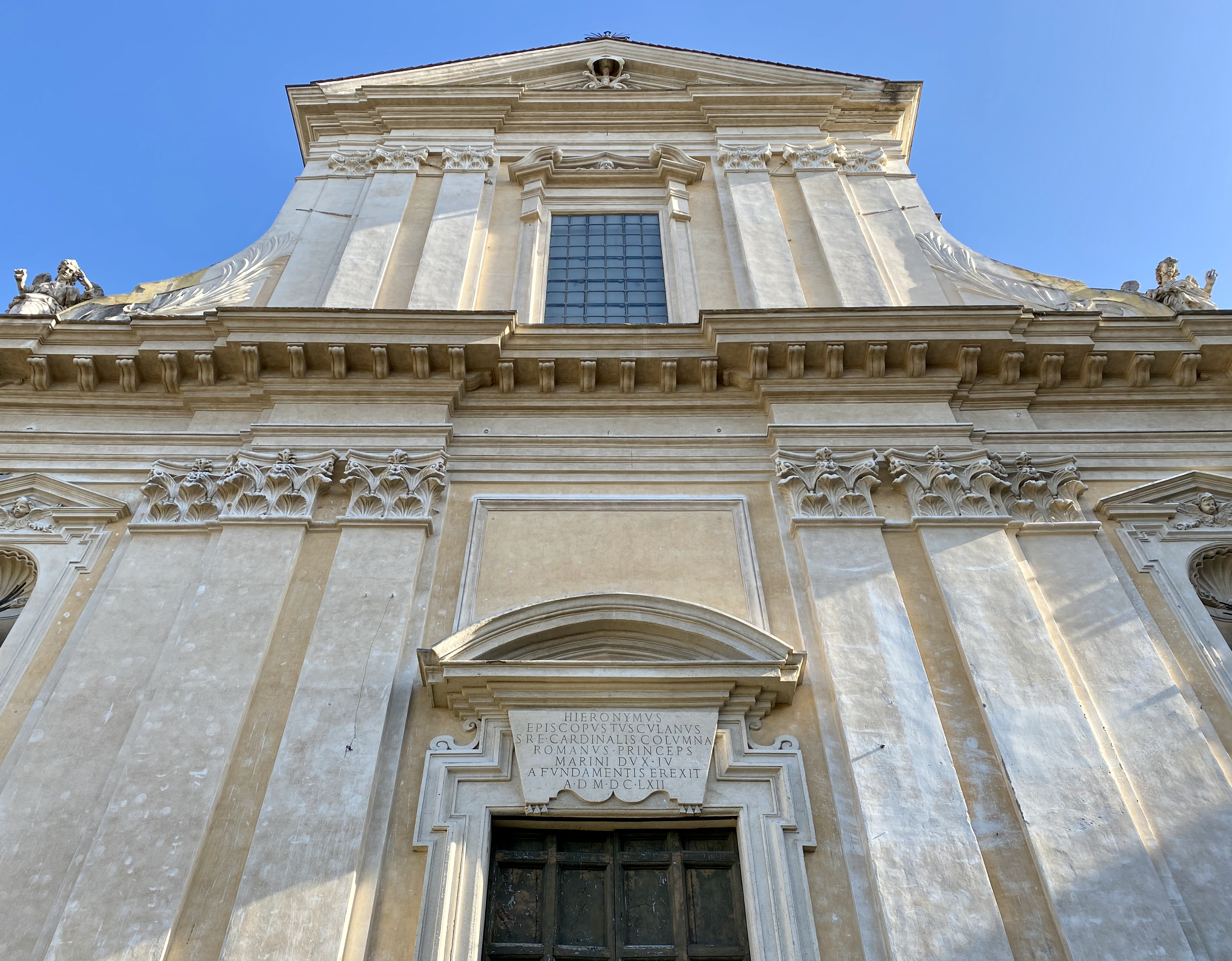
Detail of the facade of the basilica

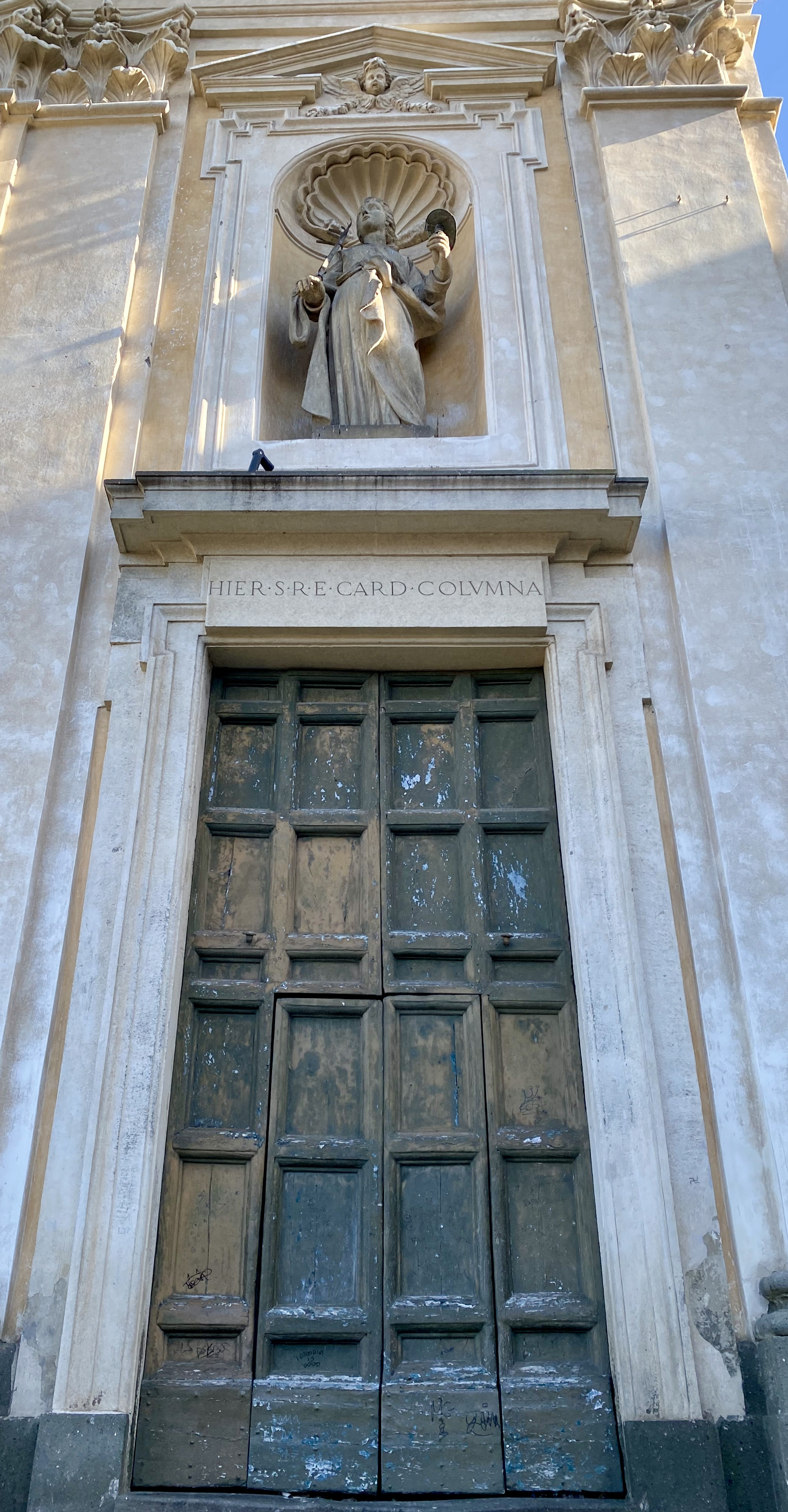
The right side door and the niche with the statue of St. Lucy, on the main facade of the basilica

The facade of the basilica was built between 1652 and 1653, more than ten years after the beginning of the construction: due to this delay in construction, the head of art was dismissed from his post and replaced, on August 28, 1651, by a certain Giacomo Alto fu Giovanni Battista, from Asti. The facade is horizontally divided into a lower and an upper part, while vertically it is tripartite with six giant lesenes of Corinthian order.

Three doors open on the facade: the following inscription appears on the two side doors:

HIER S.R.E. CARD COLUMNA
Girolamo Colonna cardinal of the Holy Roman Church

On the large central entrance portal is the following plaque:

D.O.M.
HIERONIMUS S.R.E.
CARDINALIS COLUMNA
EPISCOPUS TUSCULANUS
DUX IV MARINI ET PALIANI
A FUNDAMENTIS EREXIT
A.D. MDCLXII
"To God, Most Excellent and Greatest
Girolamo Colonna cardinal
of the Holy Roman Church
bishop of Frascati
fourth duke of Marino and Paliano
built from the foundations
in the year of our Lord 1662."

Above the two side doors are two niches surmounted by triangular cornices occupied by two painted peperino statues about two meters high: on the left is Saint Barnabas, patron saint of the city, holding the palm of martyrdom, while on the right is Saint Lucy, co-patron saint of the city, also holding a palm of martyrdom as well as a saucer containing the eyes that were gouged out of her during her martyrdom.

Above the niches, next to the volutes on the upper part of the facade, are two other painted peperino statues, the same height as the other two described above, depicting two angels.

In the tympanum is placed the coat of arms of Cardinal Girolamo Colonna, namely, a column, the heraldic symbol of the Colonna family, surmounted by a cardinal's galero. Above the pediment, in addition to an iron cross, are six peperino torches.

=== Interior ===
The main abbey collegiate and parish church is dedicated to the apostle St. Barnabas protector of the city, a magnificent building of excellent architecture, erected from the foundations with majestic and regular facade [...]

— Gaetano Moroni, Dizionario di erudizione storico-ecclesiastica

The interior has a basilica plan with three naves, 58.75 meters long and 24 meters wide at the transept, 36 meters high at the dome lantern. The nave is covered by a lunetted barrel vault, while the two side naves, located to the left and right of the main nave, are covered by barrel vaults arranged orthogonally to the vault at the main nave. Natural lighting is provided in the nave by six lunettes, three on each side, while in the dome by the lantern windows. The total expenditure for the work was between 12,000 and 24,000 pontifical scudi.

==== The counterfacade ====
On the inside of the facade, above the main entrance door, is a commemorative plaque that reads:

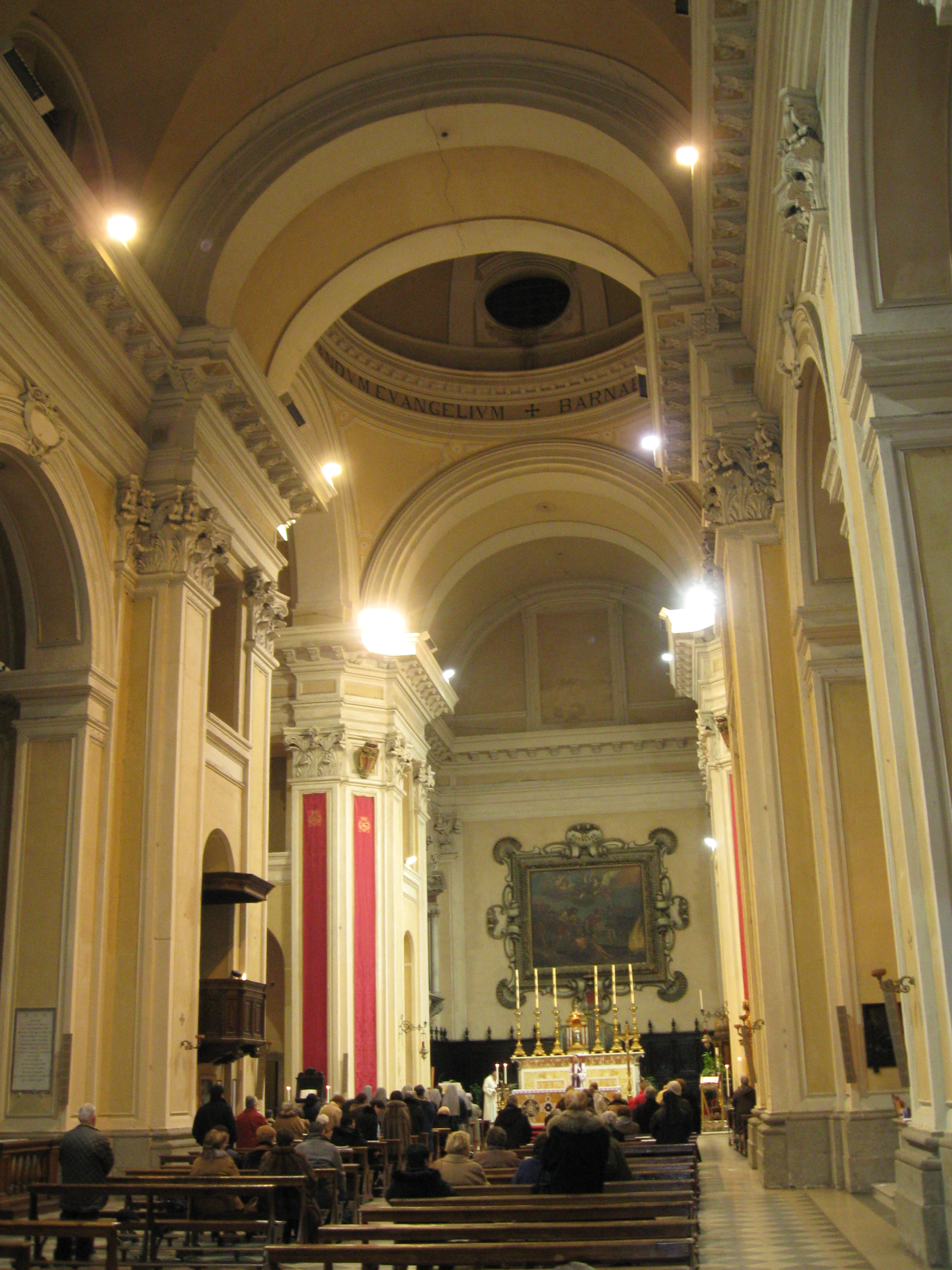
The central nave of the basilica (from right)

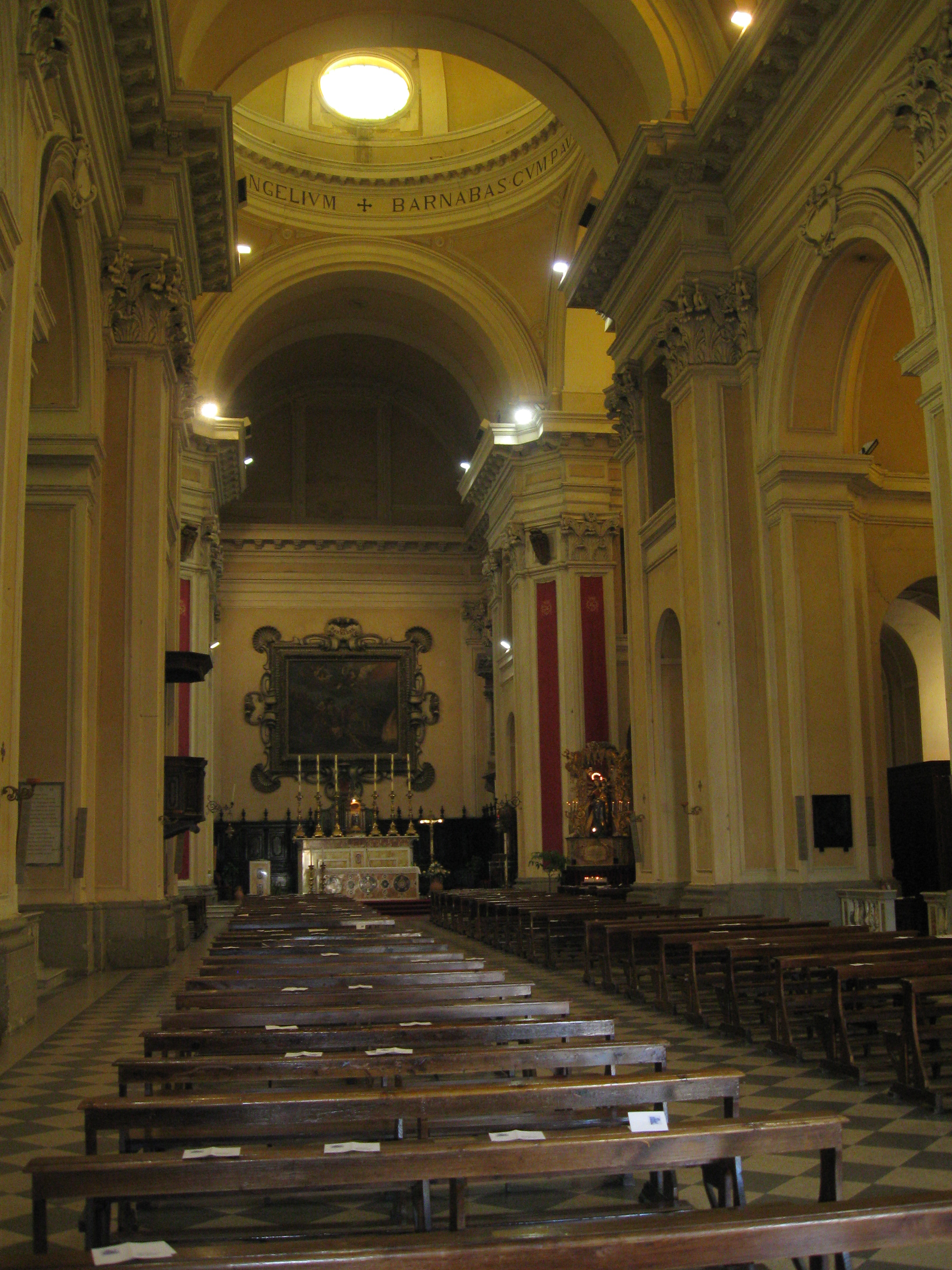
The central nave of the basilica (from left)

D.O.M.
HIERONIMUS S.R.E. CARDINALIS COLUMNA
PALIANI ET MARINENSIUM DUX ET PRINCEPS
COLUMNENSIUM ROMANORUM PRINCIPUM
PIETATEM ET VETUSTISSIMAM MAGNIFICENTIAM SECTANDO
AEQUATA RUPE
TEMPLUM HOC DIVO BARNABAE DICATUM
FUNDAMENTIS EREXIT ABBATIAM
CAPITOLUM CANONICATUS CAETERAQUE
OMNIA AUCTORITATE PONTIFICIA INSTITUIT
ET SUB PERPETUO FAMILIAE SUAE
IURESPATRONATU DONAVIT
ANNO IUBILAEI MDCL
"To the Most Excellent and Great God
Girolamo Colonna cardinal of the Holy Roman Church
duke of Marino and prince of Paliano
imitating the piety and most ancient magnificence
of the Colonna princes of Rome
leveled the cliff
erected from the foundations
this temple dedicated to Saint Barnabas
instituted the abbey the chapter of canons and other things
all under papal authority
and under the perpetual patronage
of his family he donated
in the jubilee year of 1650."

On either side of the large entrance portal, on the other hand, are two other plaques, one in Latin affixed in 1909 in celebration of the consolidation and repaving of the basilica made necessary after the damage following the 1902 earthquake, and financed by Pope Pius X, the Municipality of Marino and its citizens and Prince Marcantonio Colonna, the other in Italian affixed in 1962, to correspond to the third centenary of the consecration of the church, in memory of the unexpected visit of Pope John XXIII on August 31, 1962. The two plaques read as follows:

AN. DOMINI MCMIX
TEMPLUM HOC
PARIETUM LABE FATISCENS
AD PRISTINAM FIRMITATEM REVOCATUM EST
NOVO PAVIMENTO NOVO ADDITO CULTU
MUNIFICENTIA ET LIBERALITATE PII PP. X
ET EX COLLATIONI AERARII PUBLICII
M. ANTONII COLUMNAE
CIVIUM QUE MARINENSIUM
AUCTORE ATQUE AUDITORE
ANTONIO CARD. AGLIARDI EP. ALBANEN.
"In the year of our Lord 1909
this church
since the collapse of the crumbling walls
was foiled by the restoration of the original solidity
was again restored to worship with a new floor
thanks to the generosity and liberality of Pope Pius X
the contribution of the public treasury
of Marcantonio Colonna
and the citizens of Marino
with the encouragement and consideration
of the cardinal bishop of Albano Antonio Agliardi."

==== Right aisle ====
===== First bay =====
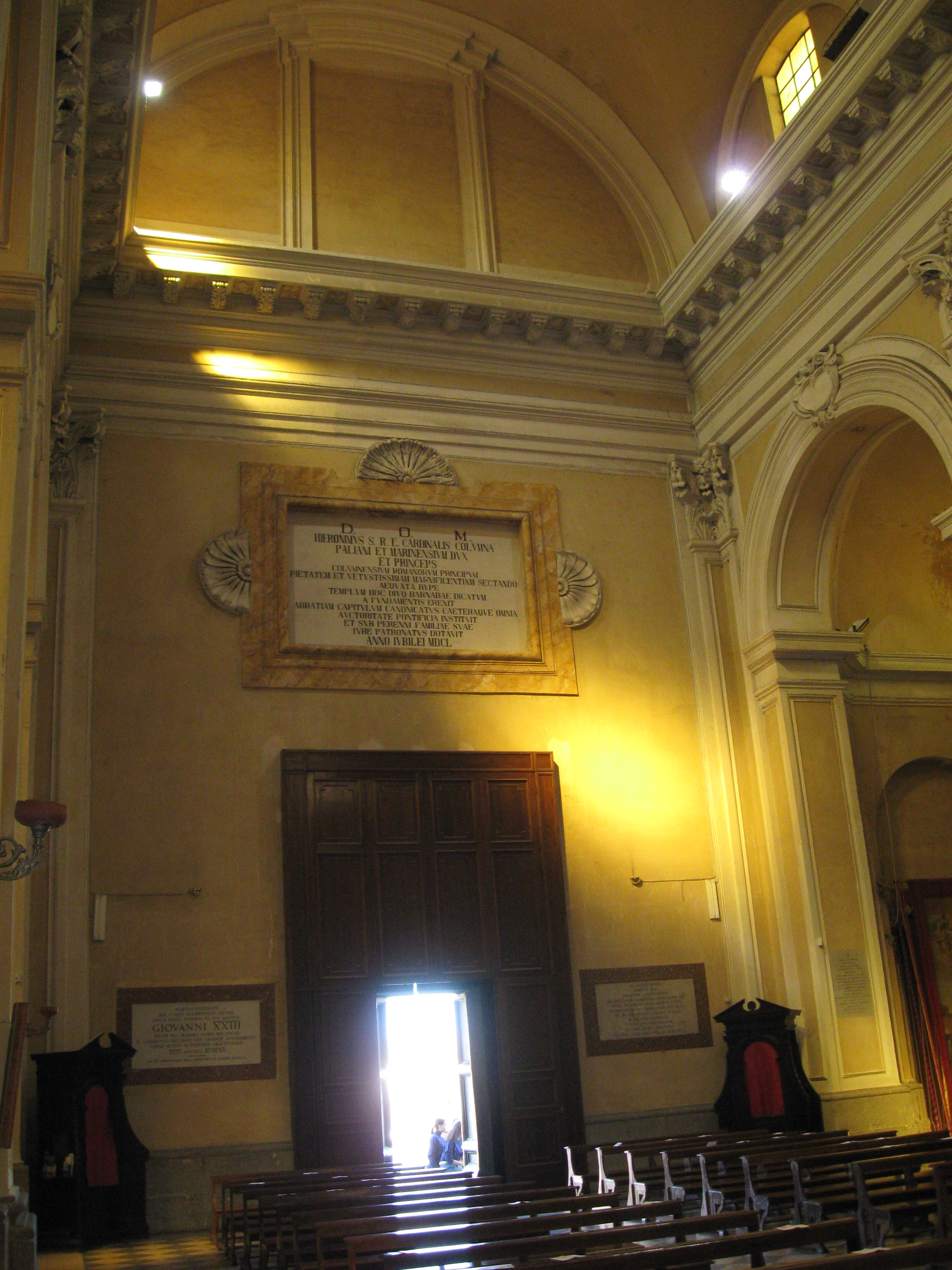
The counterfacade

The first bay of the right aisle houses no altar in particular, except for a wooden statue of St. Anthony of Padua and a large anonymous canvas depicting the "Vision of St. Anthony of Padua."

On the first pillar of the church, above a white marble stoup, a bronze cross belonging to the holy door of the basilica of St. John Lateran in Rome opened in the Jubilee of 1650 by Cardinal Girolamo Colonna, and donated to the basilica by the cardinal himself, is preserved and set in the wall. Another similar cross was donated by the same cardinal to the convent of Santa Maria ad Nives di Palazzolo on Lake Albano in the municipality of Rocca di Papa, at which Cardinal Colonna had a villa built. The relic is accompanied by the following description:

CRUX PORTAE SANCTAE
LATERANENSIS BASILICAE
ANNO IUBILAEI MDCXX[V]
QUAM APERUIT
HIERONIMUS S.R.E. CARDINALIS
COLUMNA ARCHIPRESBITER
ET A LATERE LEGATUS
SANTISS. D. INNOCENTII PAPAE X
SEQUENTI IUBILEI
ANNO MCDL
"Cross of the holy door
of the lateran basilica
of the jubilee year of 1625
which was opened
by the cardinal of the Holy Roman Church
Girolamo Colonna archpriest
and legate a latere
of His Holiness Pope Innocent X
in the following jubilee
of the year 1650."

This part of the basilica also gives access to the underground crypt, restored in the 1960s by the episcopal curia of the suburbicarian diocese of Albano to house the remains of Msgr. Guglielmo Grassi, abbot parish priest of the basilica from 1908 to 1954 and from 1937 titular bishop of Damietta in Egypt, Monsignor Giovanni Battista Trovalusci, vicar general of the suburbicarian diocese of Albano from 1934 to 1961, and the Servant of God Barbara Costantini (1700-1773). Monsignor Trovalusci's granite and iron sarcophagus in the shape of a cross is a work by architect Sandro Benedetti, while Monsignor Grassi's is a simple marble parallelepiped. Other ordinary people are also buried in the crypt, including four French and Belgian Papal Zouaves stationed in Rome who died at Marino Hospital in the 1860s.

===== Second bay =====
The second bay of the right aisle houses the altar of St. Anthony the Great or St. Joseph, and was maintained by the Confraternity of Charity, whose coat of arms (a red cross potent with the Latin word "charitas" in gold letters) stands out in the pediment.

The marble statue of St. Anthony the Great is the work of sculptor Ercole Ferrata, while the underlying painting of St. Joseph with the Child Jesus was painted in 1871 by painter Anna Maria Meucci.

Near the altar is a plaque commemorating the burial place of the Servant of God Barbara Costantini before her transfer to the underground crypt. On the second pillar of the basilica is set into the wall a plaque celebrating abbot parish priest Guglielmo Grassi, placed on September 14, 1956. The bronze medallion depicting the Genzano parish priest is the work of medallist and engraver Tommaso Peccini. The text of the plaque is as follows:

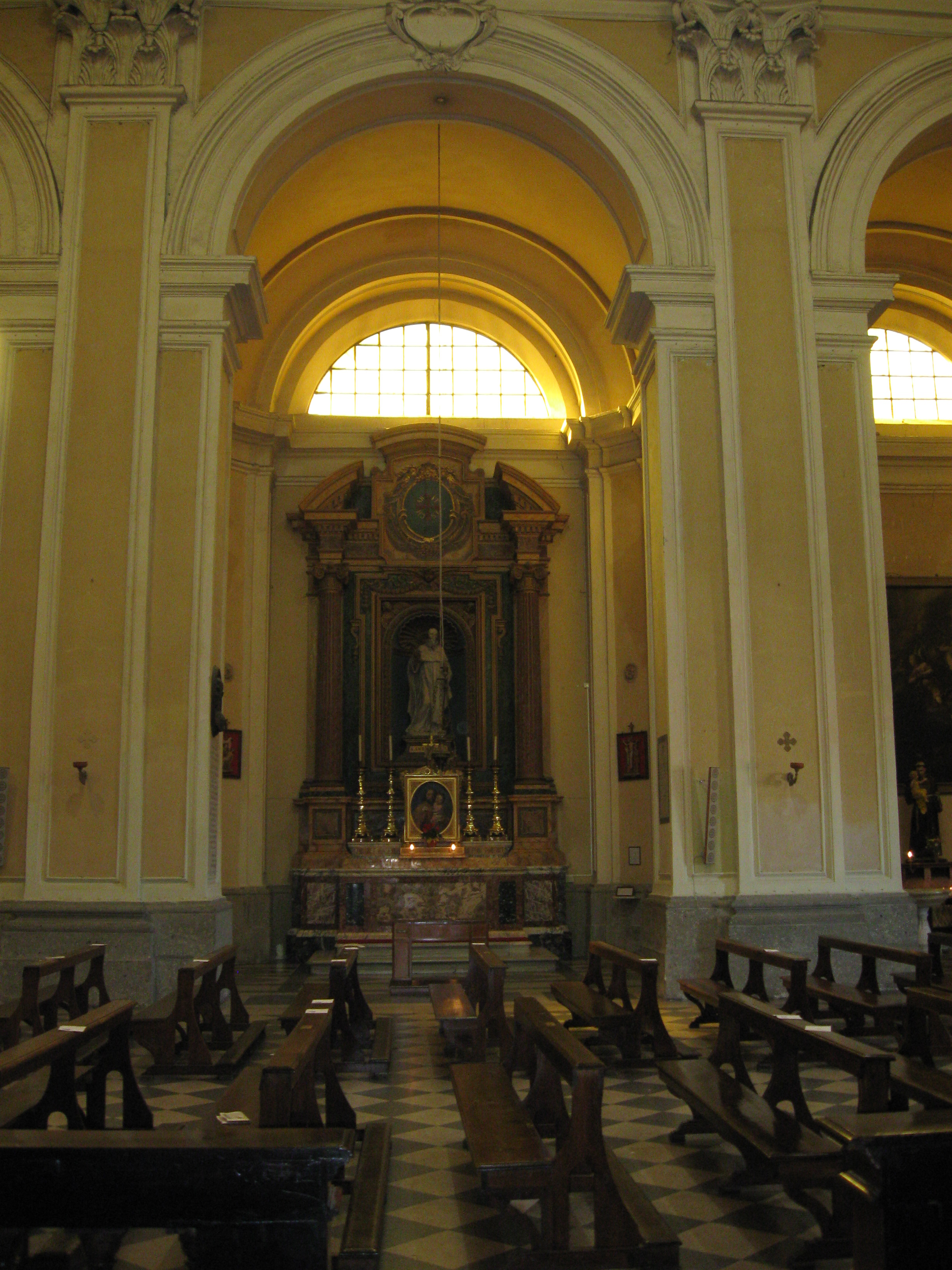
The second bay of the right aisle with the altar of St. Anthony or St. Joseph

"HE WILL RISE
FROM THE CRYPT WHERE REST
HIS MORTAL REMAINS
GUGLIELMO GRASSI
TIT. BISHOP OF DAMIATA
ABBOT OF MARINO
MCMVIII TO MCMLIV
UNITED WITH ENLIGHTENED ZEAL
THE EPISCOPAL DIGNITY
TO THE OFFICE OF PARISH PRIEST
HIS VICE SPIRIT
IN THE RELIGIOUS FAMILIES
FOUNDED BY HIM
TO SERVE
THE CLERGY IN THE CARE OF SOULS
LIVES HIS MEMORY
IN THE HEARTS OF THE PEOPLE
IN BENEDICTION
ON THE II ANNIVERSARY
OF THE PIOUS PASSING
XIV SEPTEMBER MCMLVI"

===== Third bay =====
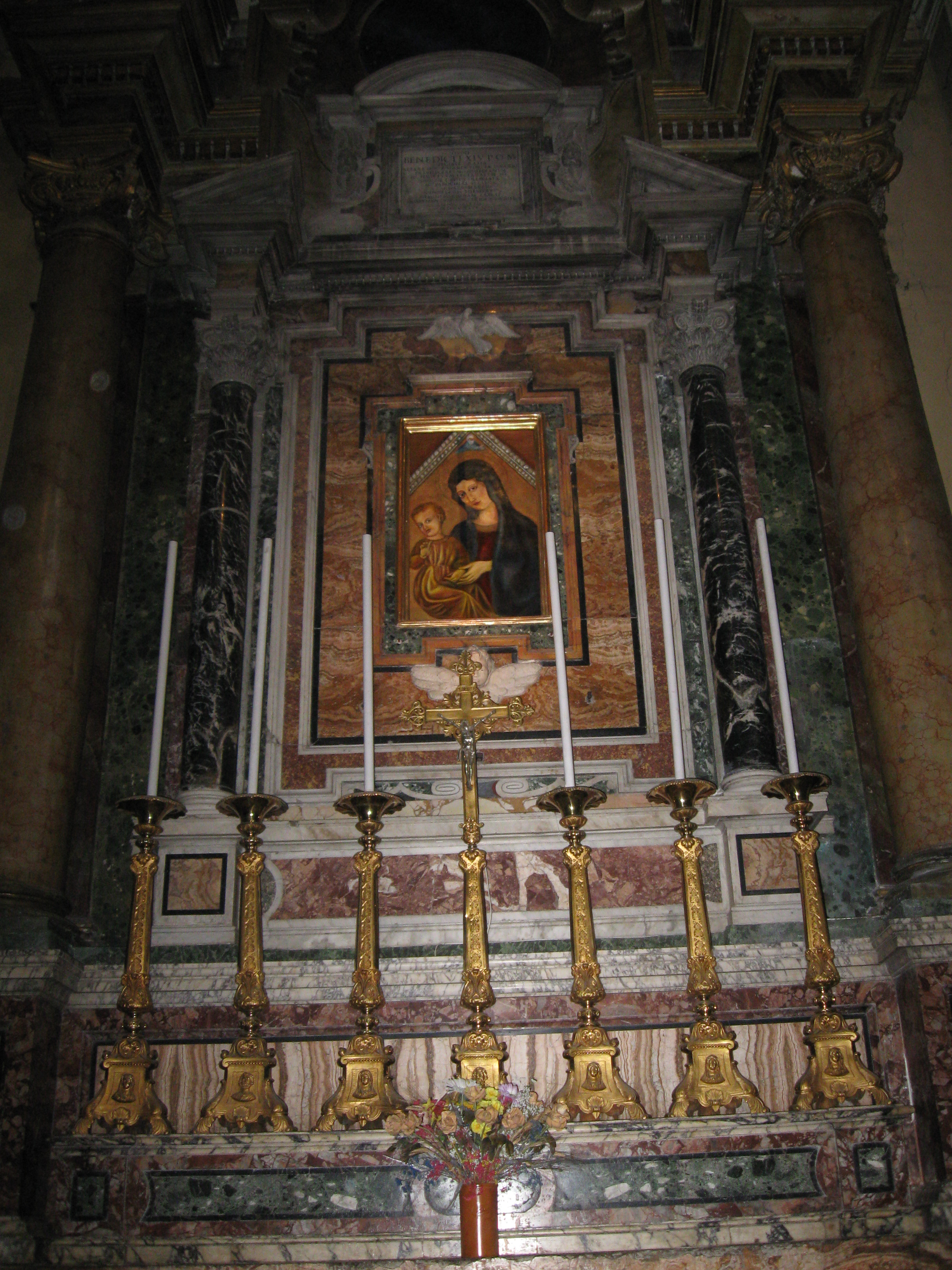
The altar of Our Lady of the People

The third bay of the right aisle houses the altar of Our Lady of the People, named after a miraculous icon of the Virgin Mary venerated by the people as Our Lady of the People. Although tradition attributes the icon to St. Luke the Evangelist, the earliest known document on the subject is a notarial act from 1280 in which it is said that the image was transported to Rome by a member of the Colonna family who had traveled to Constantinople. Pope Martin V in the first half of the fifteenth century had the icon brought to Marino to the collegiate church of Santa Lucia, where an altar was erected for it made of ancient marble, spoliated perhaps from the temple of Diana in Aricia. The icon was solemnly moved to the new basilica of San Barnaba on December 10, 1662, and placed in an altar made from the spoliation of the marbles of the old collegiate church: of particular note are the two columns of ancient yellow marble. Our Lady of the People was invoked by the people of Marino on a variety of occasions, to intercede on occasions of plagues, famine, hail, and drought. All of the icon's ornaments and votive offerings were stolen in the two sacrilegious thefts of 1911 and 1914: in the first case three anarchists were identified and convicted as the culprits, while the perpetrators of the second theft are unknown.

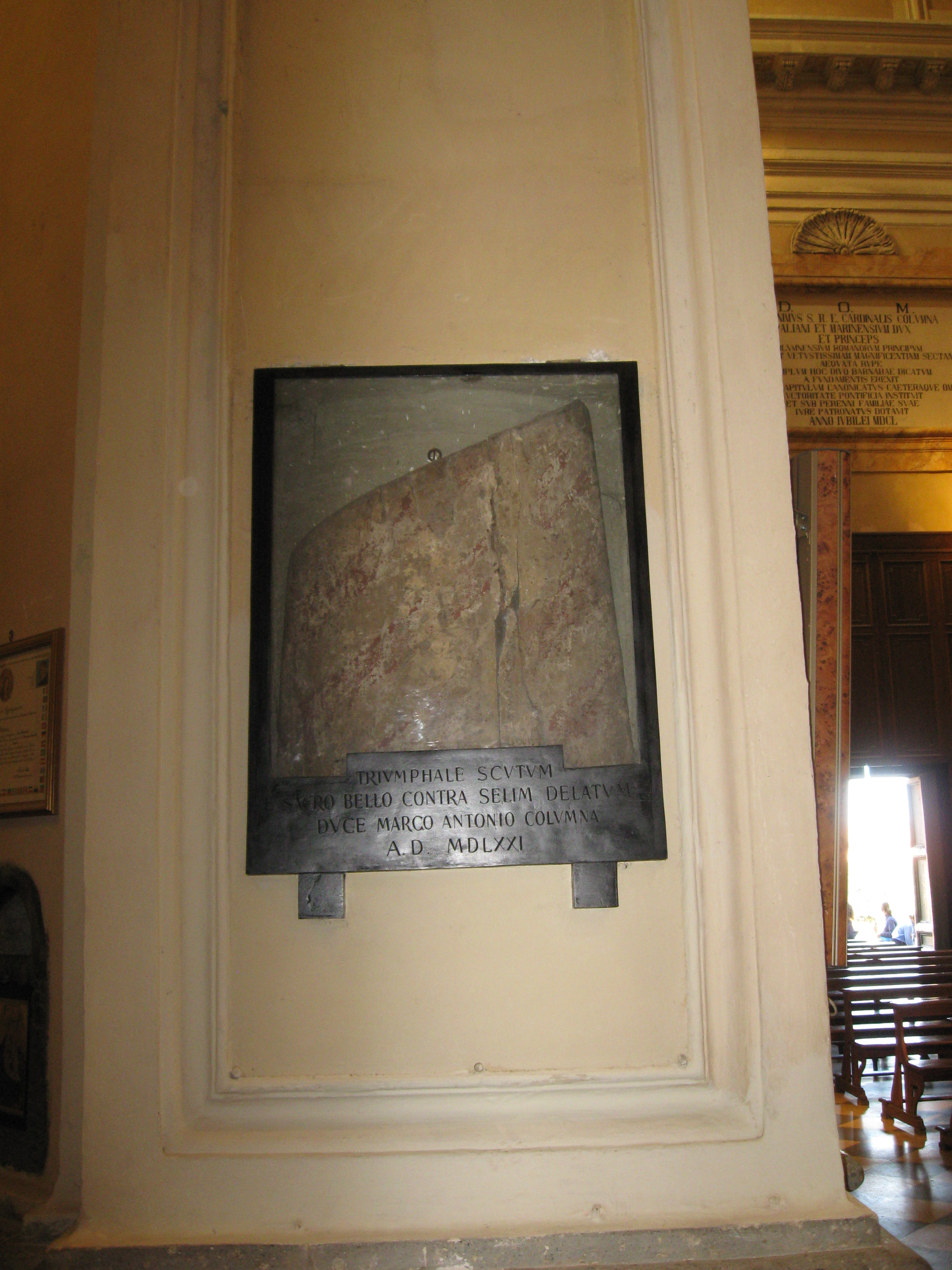
The shield of Lepanto before restoration presented in 2020

Surrounding the altar is a sequence of eighteenth-century stucco panels by an anonymous artist inside which are painted evangelical and biblical episodes: some of the scenes are badly damaged.

In the second pillar is set into the wall the shrine that houses an Ottoman shield, brought back to Marino after the 1571 battle of Lepanto against the Ottoman Empire won by the Confederate fleet of the Holy League, in which Marino's lord Marcantonio II Colonna was the admiral of the papal contingent. Engraved on the shrine are the following words:

TRIUMPHALE SCUTUM
SACRO BELLO CONTRA SELIM DELATO
DUCE MARCO ANTONIO COLUMNA
A.D. MDLXXI
"Shield triumphantly
brought back from the holy war against Selim
by commander Marcantonio Colonna
in the year of our Lord 1571."

The artifact has undergone recent restoration, presented to the public on June 11, 2020, during which it was possible to ascertain that the shield was not taken from the Turkish fleet, as was erroneously and widely believed, but is a pavise belonging to a Marinese soldier who participated in the battle of Lepanto, and later donated the shield to the local church.

On the opposite wall, that is, on the third pillar, a bronze plaque by Nino Lodi commemorating the 1929 Concordat between the Catholic Church and the Italian state is set into the wall.

Next to it is a plaque affixed by the Marinese clergy in memory of the cholera outbreak of 1837, which decimated many neighboring municipalities while sparing Marino:

MAGNAE VIRGINI DEI GENITRICI MARIAE
DE POPOLO NUNCUPATAE
ABBAS ET CANONICI HUIUS BASILICAE
QUOD
ANNO MDCCCXXXVII
CHOLERICA PESTILITATE
CIRCUM QUAQUE GRASSANTE
EXORATA PRAESENTI OPE ADFUERIT
ET MORBUS EX EORUM FINIBUS
PLANE DEPULERIT
VOTUM LIBENTES MERITO SACRAVER.[UNT]
ΧΑΡΙΣΤΗΕΡΙΑ IN ANNOS SINGULOS
DIE A FESTO ILLIUS OCTAVO
"To the great Virgin Mary mother of God
called "of the People"
the abbot and canons of this basilica
since
in the year 1837
while cholera
was hastily advancing everywhere in the surroundings
prayed fervently was immediately present at the work
and the epidemic from our borders
totally expelled
offered celebrants to consecrate to the merit
one mass a year
on the eighth day from the feast of this day"

The marble altar balustrade was made in 1946 by Marinese owner Tito Bellucci in memory of his wife Elena.

==== Left aisle ====
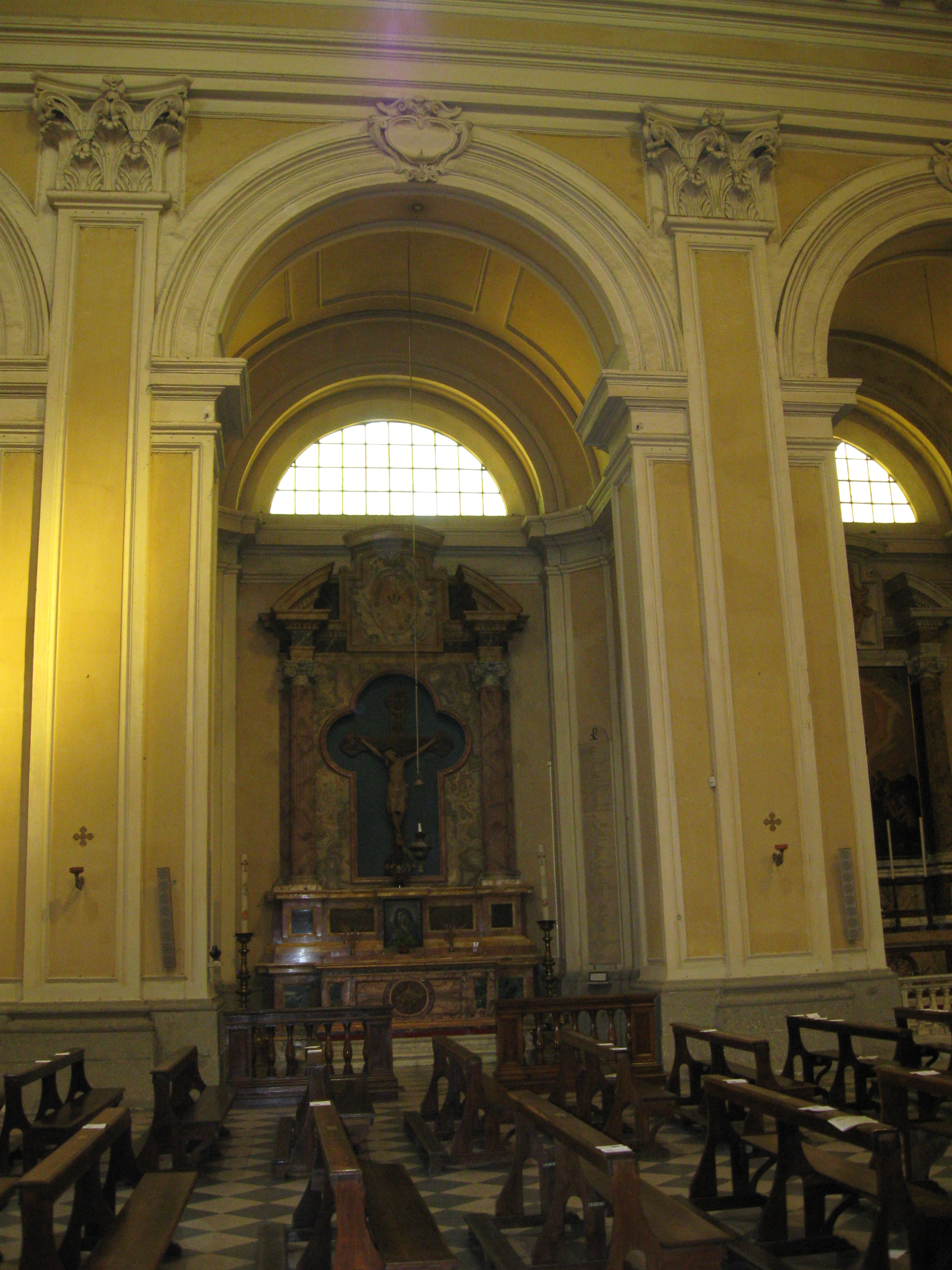
The altar of the Crucifix (second bay)

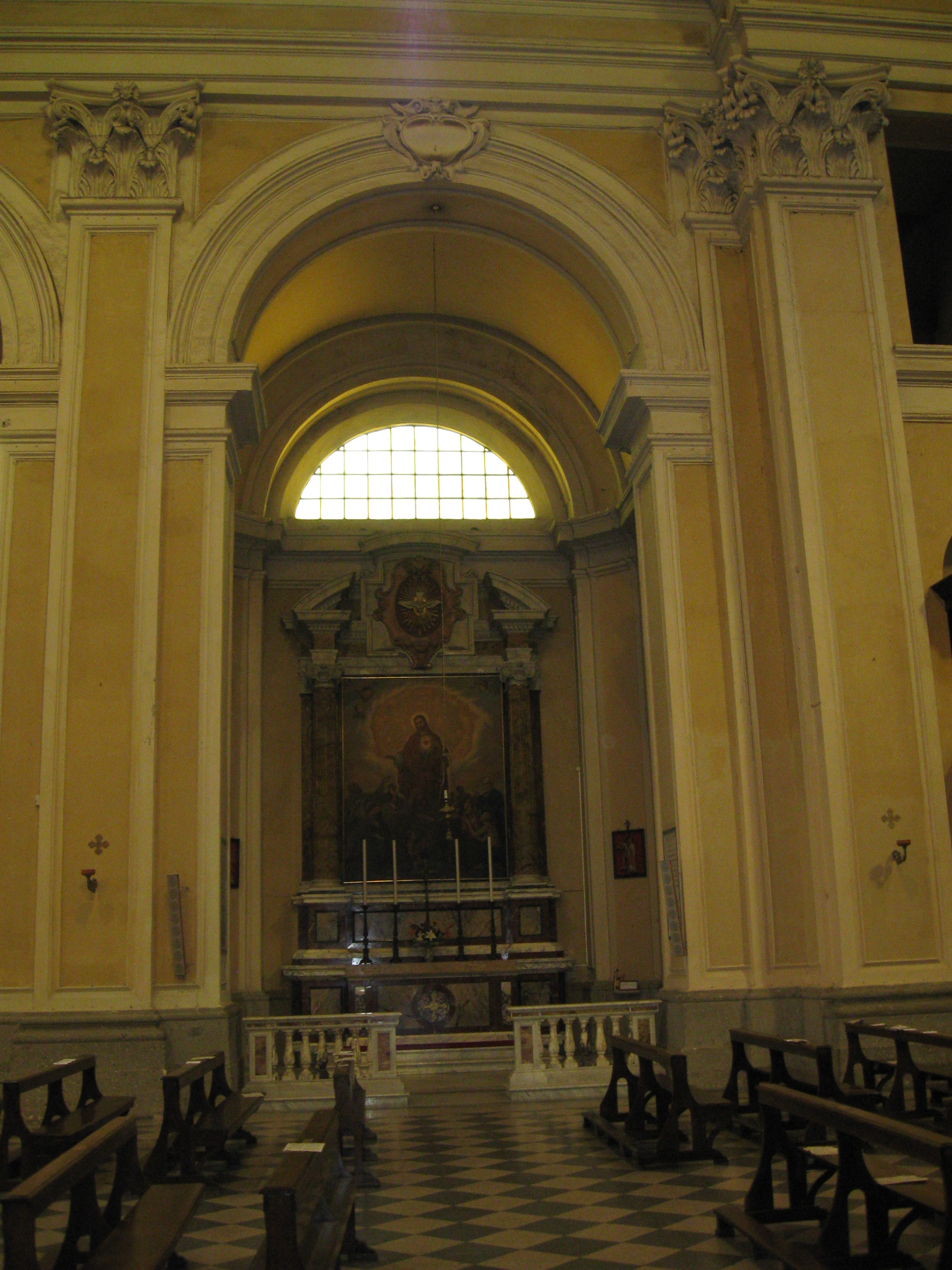
The altar of the Sacred Heart (third bay)

===== First bay =====
The first bay of the left aisle, like the parallel bay in the right aisle, houses no altar but only an anonymous gilded wooden statue depicting St. Lucy, the co-patron saint of the city, which is venerated during the co-patron feast of St. Lucy (Dec. 13). Behind the statue is a large canvas depicting the Assumption of the Virgin Mary, the work of Pier Leone Ghezzi formerly located in the Coroncina oratory below the church, which was converted in the 1920s to an auditorium.

===== Second bay =====
The second bay of the left aisle is occupied by the altar of the Crucifix or of Our Lady of Sorrows, which takes its name from a large wooden crucifix that can be attributed to a 14th-century Umbrian school. At the foot of the crucifix is a small "Our Lady of Sorrows" by Carlo Maratta.

Walled to the four pillars of the chapel are many marble plaques commemorating the names of those who died in the Anglo-American air raids of February 2 and 17, 1944, and in the subsequent air raids. (Note: See Marino's Fallen in the Second World War, Marino during the Second World War and The Roman Castles during the Second World War (Italian))

===== Third bay =====
The third bay of the left aisle houses the altar of the Sacred Heart, restored in 1952 on the occasion of the 50th anniversary of the priestly ordination of Giovanni Battista Trovalusci, at the time vicar general of the suburbicarian diocese of Albano. The large altar painting is a work by Giuseppe Ciotti made in 1966, depicting suffering humanity resorting to the Sacred Heart of Jesus under the guidance precisely of Monsignor Trovalusci.

Set at the second pillar is a marble tombstone commemorating the sub-officer of the Papal Gendarmerie Domenico Terribili, who was awarded the Order of St. Sylvester and died on Jan. 10, 1859, with the following inscription:

HEIC IN PACE CHRISTI QUIESCIT
DOMINICUS TERRIBILIS
SUBCENTURIO EMERITUS
IN COHORTE TRANQUILLITATI
PUBLICAE TUENDAE
OB RES PRECLARE GESTAS
ADLECTUS INTER EQUITES
S. SILVESTRI P. M.
RELIGIONE IN DEUM
FIDE IN PONTIFICES
MAXIMNOS EXIMIA
DECES IDIB. IANUARIIS
AN. MDCCCLIX AN. N. P. M. LII
HECTOR POSUIT
PATRI OPTIMI BENEMERENTI
"Here rests in the peace of Christ
Domenico Terribili
sub-officer emeritus
in the battalion that the public
tranquility must maintain
for renowned achievements
ascribed among the knights
of St. Sylvester
for religion in God
and faith in the popes
greatly noble
January 10
1850 at the age of 52
Ettore laid
to the meritorious father"

==== The transept ====
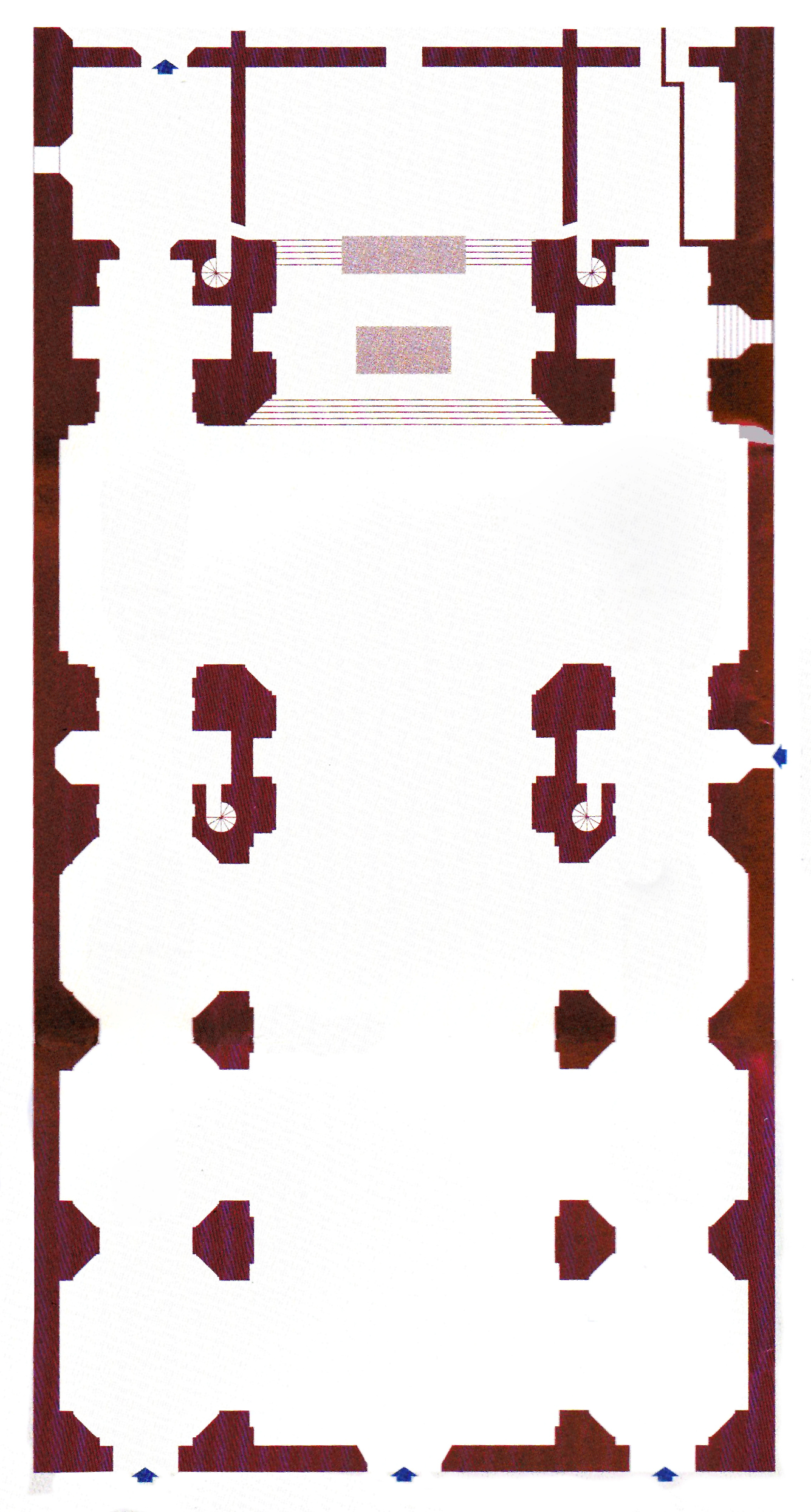
Floor plan of the basilica

===== Right transept =====
The right transept houses the altar of the Blessed Sacrament, or Our Lady of Mount Carmel, built by Giovanni Battista Mochi using ancient colored marbles such as antique yellow marble, black marble and serpentine marble. The altarpiece is an anonymous large painting depicting Our Lady of Mount Carmel, the Child Jesus and Saints Teresa of Avila and John of the Cross. The tabernacle is a modern work by Luigi Gozzi.

===== Left transept =====
In the left transept is the altar of St. Bartholomew, a privilegiatum altar built by Giulio Galantini of Marina and his family in the second half of the 17th century using ancient colored marbles: the inlaid altar frontal is noteworthy.

The altarpiece is a "Martyrdom of St. Bartholomew" by Giacinto Campana, a contemporary copy of the original by Giovanni Francesco Barbieri painted and preserved in the church of San Martino in Siena between 1635/1636, probably made on commission by Cardinal Girolamo Colonna. A second copy, dated 1774, by the painter Annunziata Verchiani is kept in the Church of the Visitation in Viterbo.

==== The dome ====
The dome is pavilion-shaped on the outside, while inside it is rounded: the lantern is located 31 meters high. Along the base of the dome itself is the following inscription on the inside:

AD APOSTOLICUM MUNUS MARTYRII CORONAM ADIUNXIT + BARNABAS CUM PAULO APOSTOLUS GENTIUM

— Inscription at the base of the dome of the basilica.

The last restorations to the dome structure were carried out after World War II, after an Anglo-American air raid in May 1944 had partially weakened the four huge supporting pillars.

==== The chancel and the summer choir ====
In the chancel, on the back wall behind the tabernacle, stands a large painting depicting the Martyrdom of St. Barnabas, attributed to Bartolomeo Gennari (1594-1661), a pupil of Guercino's workshop (1591-1666), if not to Guercino himself. Also valuable is the picture's frame, beneath which is the Latin inscription Divo Barnabae ("To Saint Barnabas").

Also behind the tabernacle, on the right and left walls are two marble niches, the work of 17th-century Roman marble workers Carlo Spagna and Gabriele Renzi. In the right niche is a monument to Cardinal Girolamo Colonna, by sculptor Alessandro Algardi (1595-1654), in which the cardinal appears praying and kneeling on a prie-dieu bearing the Colonna coat of arms carved on it. The cardinal, according to scholar Carlo Bartolomeo Piazza, is said to be buried in the basilica, but it is conventionally acknowledged that, despite his original intention to be buried in Marino, Cardinal Colonna was later buried at the basilica of St. John Lateran in Rome. Under the niche, the following inscription is affixed:

D.O.M.
MORE CARTHUSIANO
UT IUCUNDAM REDDERET MORTEM
ET PROPRIAM REQUIEM OCULIS PROPONERET
ANIMO COMPOSITO ET IMMORTALI
SIBI VIVENS POSUIT
TOTIUS PRAEDICTI ORDINIS PROTECTOR
HIERONIMUS CARDINALIS COLUMNA
A.D. MDCLII

The tabernacle is made of fine peach-flower marble and dates from the 17th century: it consists of a silver canopy supported by four Corinthian columns. The silver-plated metal ciborium kept inside is a modern work by sculptor Tommaso Merendoni.

The baptismal font, located to the right of the high altar in a niche, on the other hand, is the work of 17th-century Roman artists, made of black marble and wooden columns.

==== The winter choir ====
In the winter choir chapel, there are some noteworthy works preserved: a St. Francis of Assisi attributed to Girolamo Muziano (1528-1592) or Giovan Battista Caracciolo (1578-1635), then a Humanity of Christ by Cherubino Alberti based on a design by Michelangelo Buonarroti, two ovals on two opposing walls depicting St. Peter and St. Paul, attributed to Guido Reni. There is also a St. Roch, a copy of the painting preserved at the church of Santa Maria delle Grazie and attributed to Domenichino or Mattia Farnese (1631-1681), a painting originally intended for the chapel of St. Roch in the village of the same name, which was razed to the ground in 1944. Also valuable are the ceiling frescoes, depicting the Glory of the Holy Spirit on a fake, broken-down ceiling, and the walnut choir stalls, dating from 1747.

== The parish ==
The parish of the basilica of San Barnaba is the most important in the municipality of Marino and the deanery of the same name, and its parish priest since 1731 has held the title of mitred abbot nullius diocesios. The parish is also of great importance in the diocese: it is the only basilica in the territory besides the cathedral basilica of San Pancrazio in Albano Laziale, and its chapter, as already mentioned, was recognized first in importance and antiquity along with that of the collegiate church of Santa Maria Assunta in Ariccia following the diocesan synods of 1668, 1687, and 1847.

The parish, whose deanery is populated by nearly 40,720 people as of 2007, covers part of the historic center of Marino (occupying the Santa Lucia district, the Castelletto district, the Acquasanta district, the Vascarelle district, the Civitella district and the Villa Desideri district) and in some localities of the municipal territory (Monte Crescenzo, Campofattore, Pascolari di Castel Gandolfo, Castagnole).

Until a few years ago, the localities of Palazzolo, which administratively is included in the municipality of Rocca di Papa, and Pozzo Carpino, which is an exclave of the municipality of Grottaferrata, were also included in the parish territory. The autonomy of the other parishes in the historic center, where there are churches that were founded with a conventual function, is rather recent: the church of Santa Maria delle Grazie was constituted as a parish only in 1954, while the church of Santissima Trinità was founded in the late 1950s.

Also included in the parish territory are the sanctuary of Santa Maria dell'Acquasanta and the church of St. Anthony of Padua in the Castelletto district. In the same building as the basilica, the Oratory of the Gonfalone and the former Oratory of the Coroncina are located.

== See also ==
- Marino, Lazio
- Roman Catholic Suburbicarian Diocese of Albano
- Metropolitan City of Rome Capital
- Colonna family

== Bibliography ==
- Giuseppe Tomassetti (1976) [1908]. Luisa Chiumenti e Fernando Bilancia (ed.). La Campagna Romana. Vol. IV. Città di Castello: Banco di Roma.
- Onorati, Ugo (1992). San Barnaba Apostolo nella storia e nelle tradizioni di Marino. Marino: Pro-Loco di Marino.
- Antonia Lucarelli (1997). Memorie marinesi. Biblioteca G. Torquati.
- Gaetano Moroni (1840). Dizionario di erudizione storico-ecclesiastica. Venezia: Tipografia Emiliani.
- Zaccaria Negroni (1971). Marino sotto le bombe (3 ed.). Marino: Tipografica Santa Lucia.
- Zaccaria Negroni (1999). L'ingegner sorriso. Marino: Edizioni Santa Lucia.
- Vittorio Rufo e altri (1991). Marino - Immagini di una città. Roma: Fratelli Palombi.
- Girolamo Torquati (1863). Della prodigiosa figura di Maria Santissima del Rosario che si venera in Marino nella Basilica di San Barnaba. Roma.
