= Santa Maria Assunta, Ariccia =

Church in Lazio, Italy

Coordinates: 41°43′15.8″N 12°40′18.16″E

Santa Maria Assunta
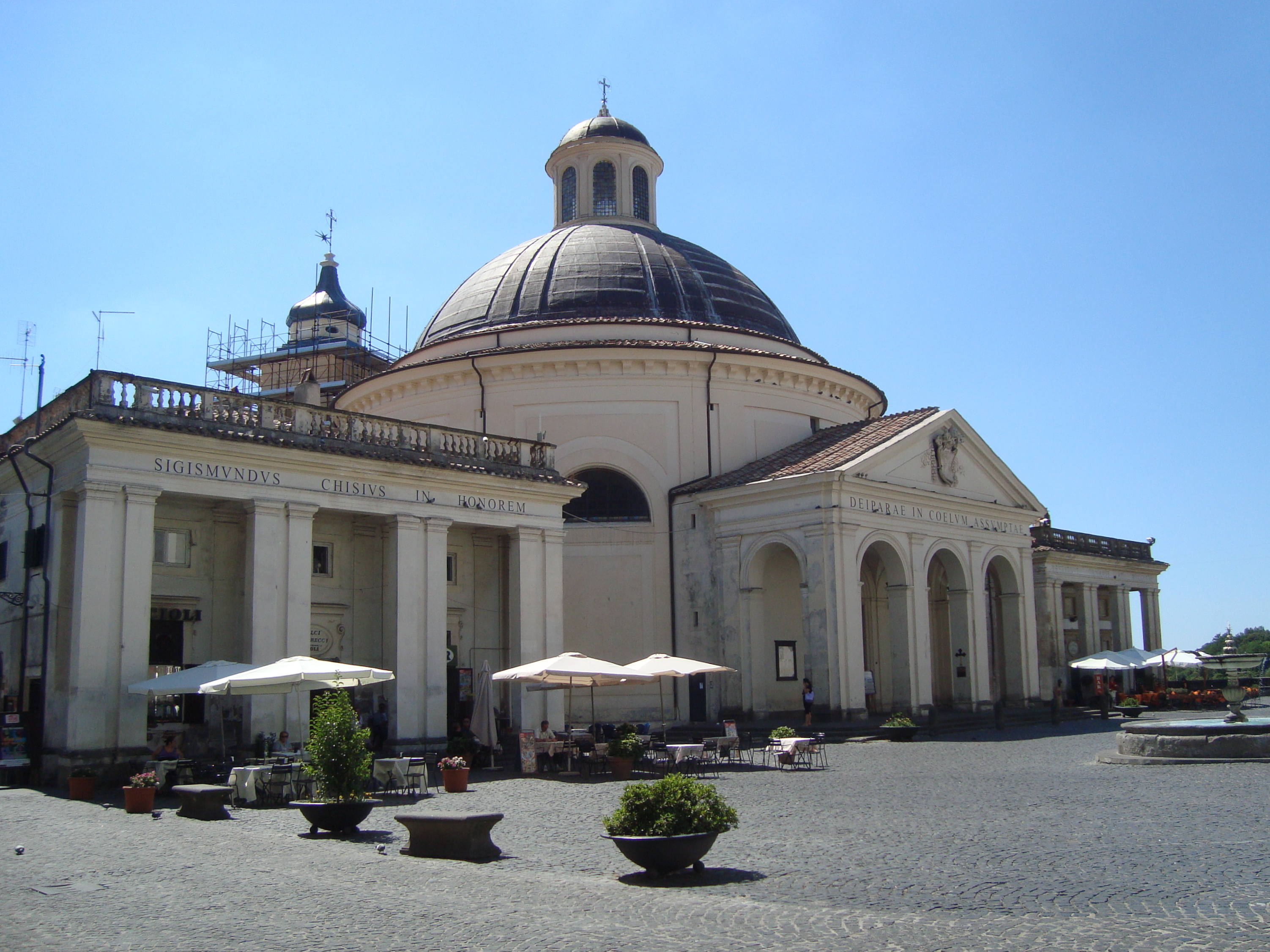
- Facade of church
- Click on the map for a fullscreen view
- Location: Ariccia
- Country: Italy
- Denomination: Catholic

History
- Status: parish church
- Consecrated: 1664

Architecture
- Functional status: Active
- Architect: Gian Lorenzo Bernini
- Architectural type: Church
- Style: baroque

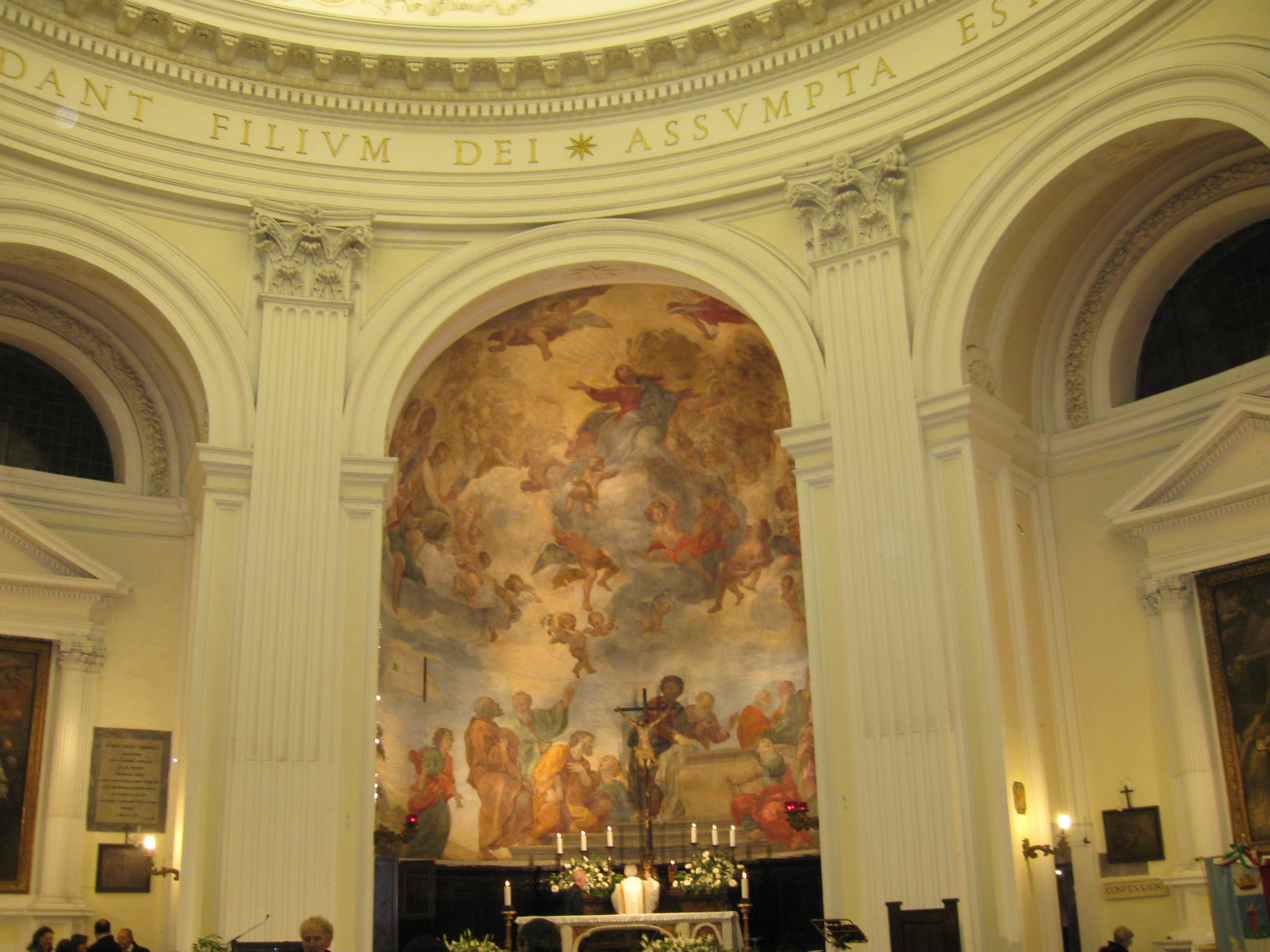
Apse frescoed with Assumption of Madonna

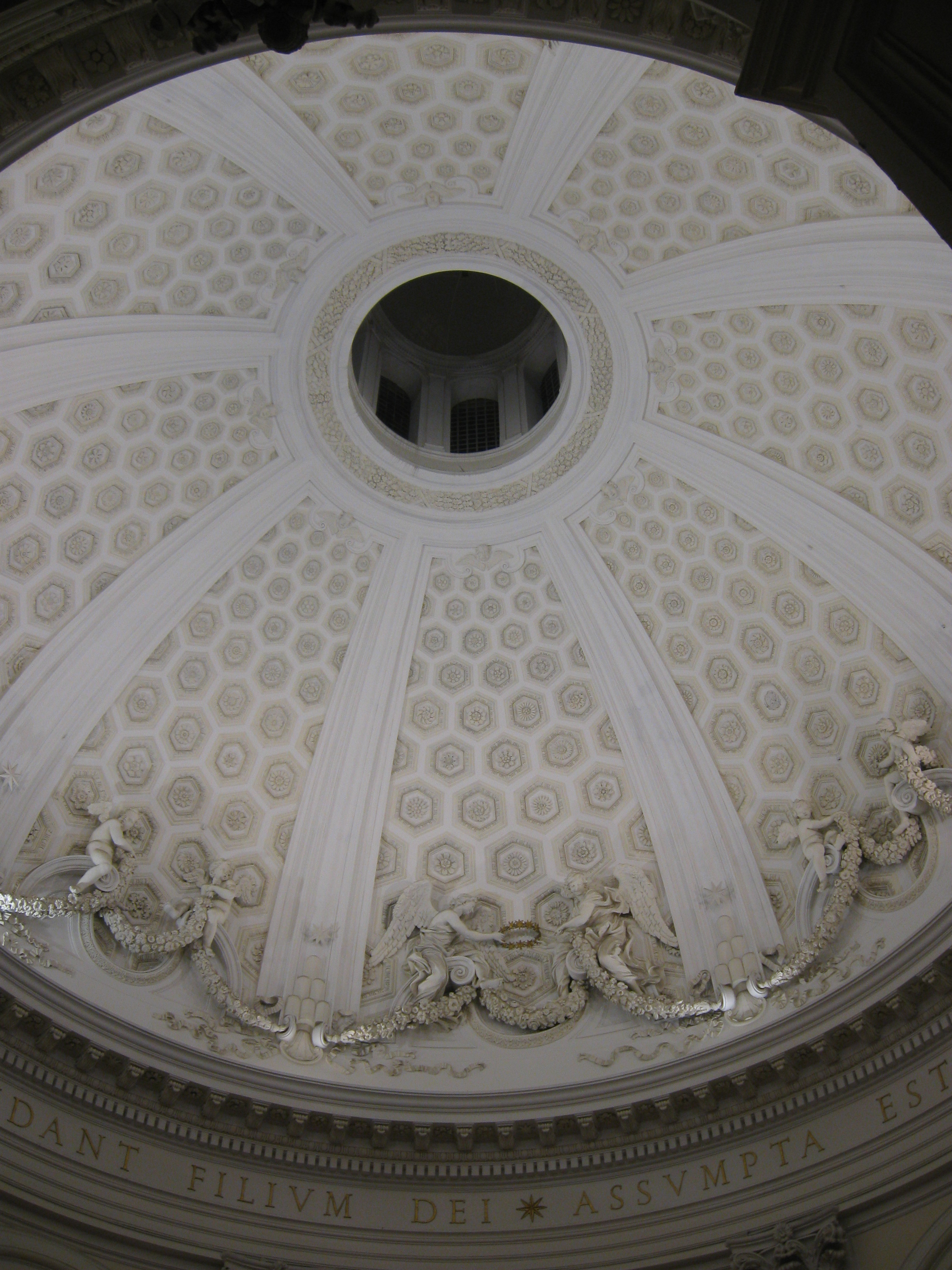
Cupola

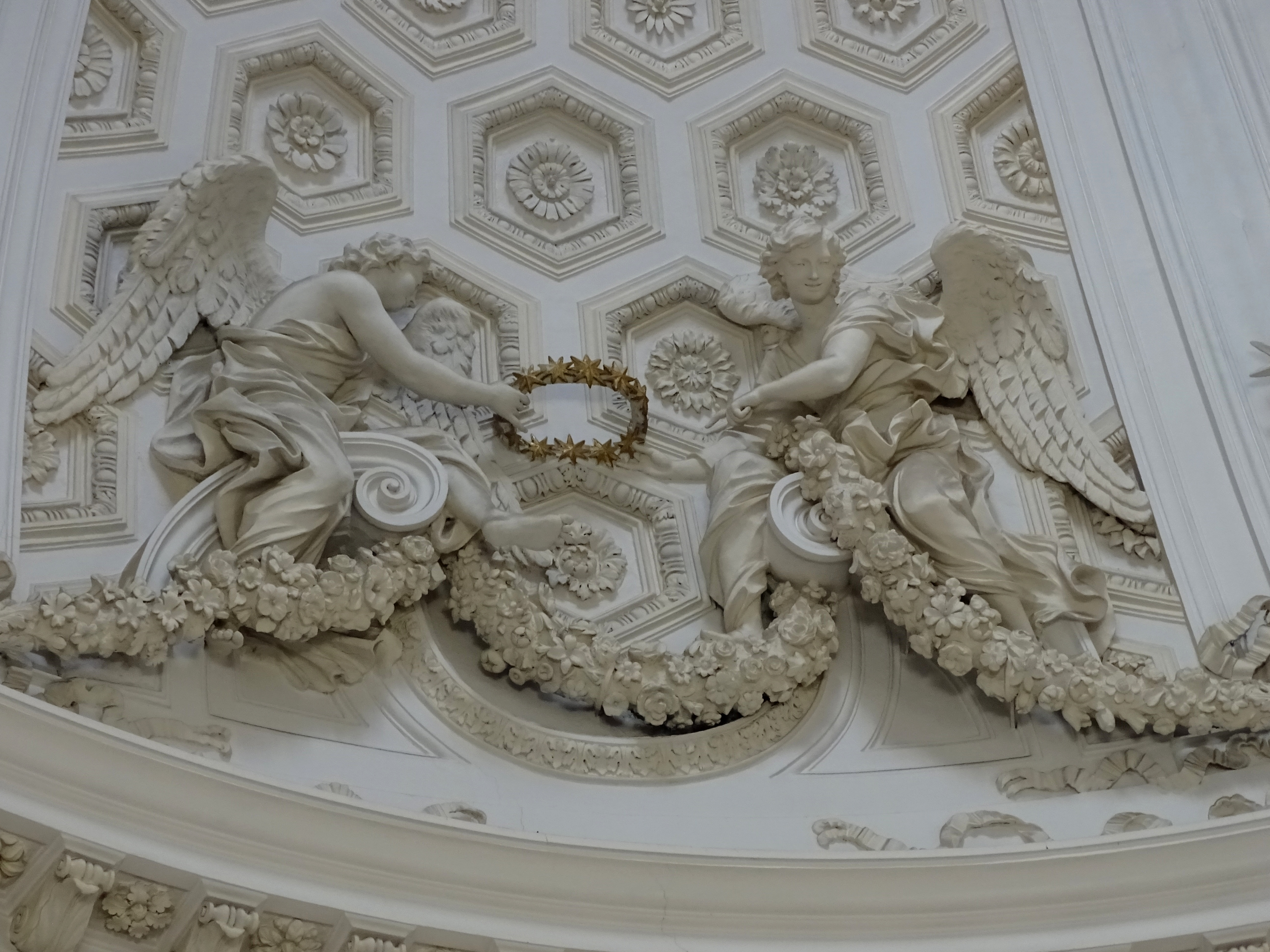
Detail of base of cupola

Santa Maria Assunta is a Roman Catholic parish church designed in 1661–1665 by Gianlorenzo Bernini; and located in the center of the town of Ariccia, Italy, where it stands across a piazza from the Palazzo Chigi Ariccia, once belonging to the family of Pope Alexander VII, Bernini's patrons in the construction of this church.

== Architecture ==
A collegiate church had existed in Ariccia since perhaps the 6th century, and it was based around the former church of San Nicola di Bari in town. That church was rebuilt and rededicated over the centuries. But interested in erecting a prominent church across from their palace in town, also undergoing restructuring by Bernini, the Chigi family commissioned the designs of Santa Maria Assunta from the architect. Construction began circa 1661 and led to consecration on 16 May 1664.

== Exterior ==
While the exterior is austere and has a portico and dome that recall the Pantheon in Rome; the interior, including the ceiling of the dome, is highly decorated in a Baroque fashion. The entrance portico has three arches flanked by walls with decorative Doric pilasters. Originally the portico cornice had the script stating Beatae Mariae Virgini Dei Matri in Caelum Assumptae (Blessed Mary Virgin Assumption as Heavenly Mother), along with a coat of arms of Pope Alexander VII. The circular church appears to have stood independently at the site upon construction.

The two flanking wings that encircle the church were built in 1771 under the patronage of Prince Sigismondo Chigi; they were not part of Bernini's design. This reconstruction altered the cornice to read Deiparae in Coelum Assumptae Mother of God in Heaven after Assumption. Inside the portico, above the door, is a star in a circle with the inscription of Stella matutina ora pro nobis (Morning Star pray for us). The buildings at the wings have two-story rectangular porticos with entrances flanked by double pilasters. In the piazza in the front are two fountains. In 1778, a rededication included lateral altars in the church dedicated to the Holy Trinity and St Augustine of Ippona. Further reconstruction was performed in the last century to the structures, repairing damage done by bombardments during World War II, and repairing damage to exterior stucco.

== Interior ==
The pavement mosaic was designed by Bernini with the Chigi heraldic symbol in the center; the stone was replaced in 1956, changing from brick and Peperino stone to two colors of marble. The cupola of the dome was decorated by Bernini's studio, but at the base the Angels that sustain the garlands were sculpted by Antonio Raggi. The apse was frescoed with an Assumption of the Madonna. The church has six lateral altars. On the left, the altarpieces are:

- Saint Antony Abbot by Giacinto Gimignani
- Holy Family by Ludovico Gimignani
- St Thomas of Villanova in agony by Raffaele Vanni

On the right, the altarpieces are:

- Saint Francesco di Sales by Emilio Taruffi
- Saint Augustine by Bernardino Mei
- St Roch by Alessandro Mattia da Farnese.

== See also ==
- List of works by Gian Lorenzo Bernini
- Basilica of San Barnaba
