= Jacoba of Settesoli =

Follower of Francis of Assisi

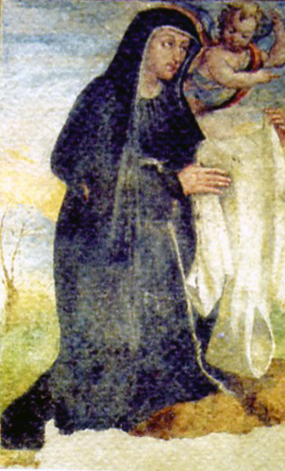
Jacobina Settesoli, painting on canvas.

Blessed Jacoba of Settesoli (Italian: Giacoma de Settesoli; 1190–1273? was a follower of the Italian saint Francis of Assisi. She is also called Jacqueline Marie de Settesoli, or Brother Jacoba, as Francis had named her.

== Life ==
Jacoba dei Settesoli was born in Rome and married into the noble Frangipani family. She was a young widow when she heard of the holy man, Francis of Assisi. Desiring to meet the penitent in order to seek his spiritual advice, she got her wish when Francis and his small band came to Rome to obtain papal approval of the Franciscan Rule of life. Having heard Francis preach, she sought his guidance on how to be charitable.

Francis advised her not to abandon her family, so she did not join the Franciscan convent. Instead, she turned the administration of her affairs over to her two sons and spent the rest of her life in the practice of good works. Though some scholars suggest that Jacopa joined the Third Order of Saint Francis, this is an anachronism. She may have led a similar life to that prescribed in the Rule for Franciscan Tertiaries, but the formal foundation of a third order was inaccurately attributed to St. Francis after his death by Pope Nicholas IV, and did not really occur until 1289.

When he travelled to Rome, Francis would stay as her guest. She gave some of her family's property in Trastevere, Rome to Francis and the brothers to use as a hospice for lepers and she provided for their needs. Francis and Lady Jacoba became friends.

At his request, she was present with him at his death. As Francis lay dying, he wanted to taste once more his favorite almond treat and asked “Brother” Jacoba to bring him some. Even before word had reached her, she had already prepared the almond pastries for Francis. The arrival of Lady Jacoba, who had come with her two sons and a great retinue to bid Francis farewell, caused some consternation, since women were forbidden to enter the friary. But Francis in gratitude to this Roman noblewoman, made an exception, and “Brother Jacoba”, as Francis had named her on account of her fortitude, remained to the last. Francis died on the evening of Saturday, 3 October 1226.

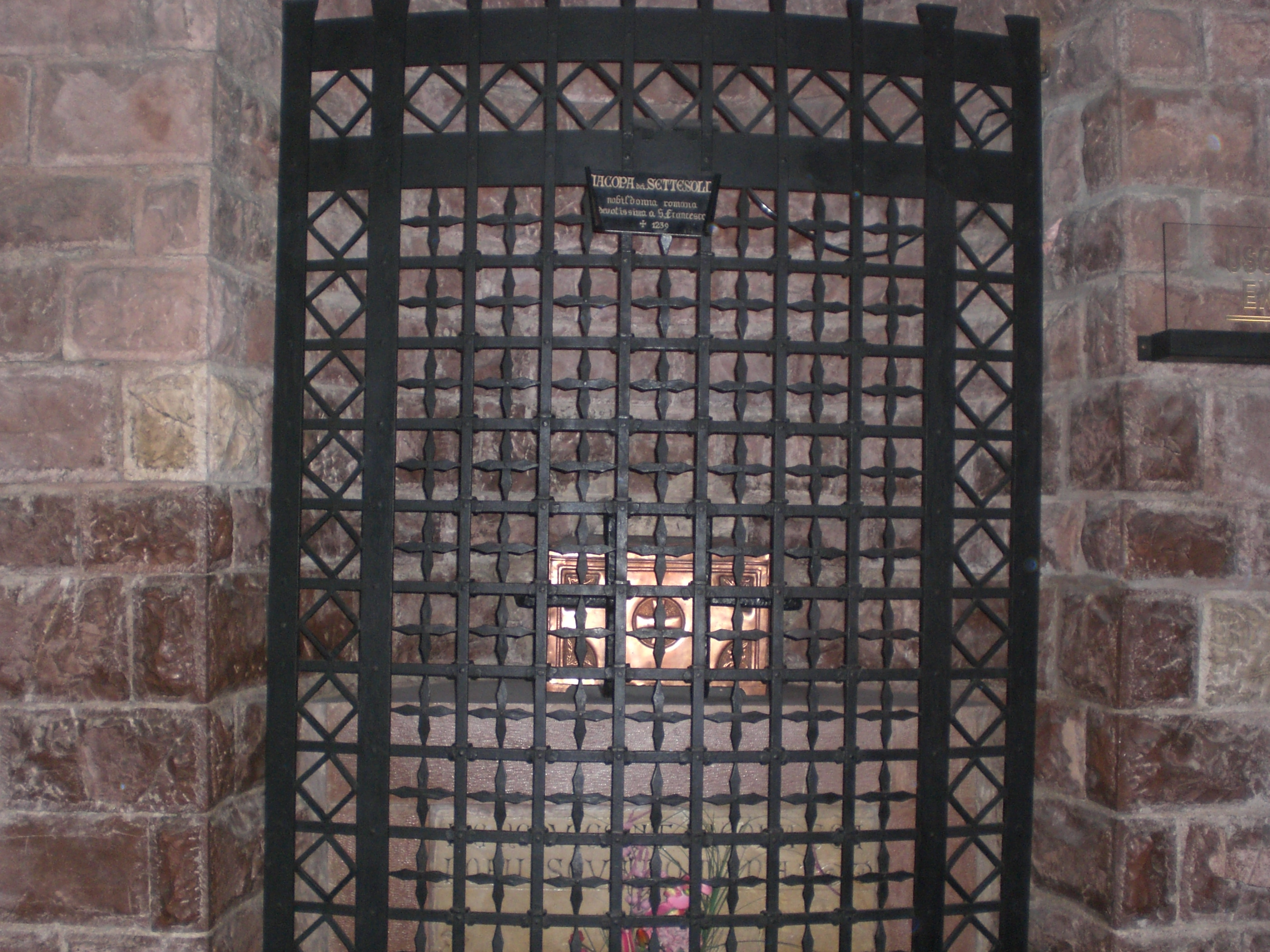
Grave of Jacoba of Settesoli.

The date of her death in Assisi may be February 8, 1239, although some believed she lived until 1273?. She was buried in the Lower Church of the Basilica of Saint Francis, but on August 13, 1932 she was re-interred in the crypt of the Basilica of San Francesco d'Assisi, near those of Francis and his loyal brothers, Leo, Rufino, Masseo, and Angelo. Lady Jacoba's feast day is 8 February.

Her handmade linens and the garment and shoes Lady Jacoba made for Francis are on display in the Lower Basilica along with other of Francis' artifacts.

== Legacy ==
There is a tradition among Franciscan communities to commemorate the Transitus (i.e. "passing" or death) of St. Francis. In some, there has developed the custom of distributing small almond confections (cookies, scones, etc.), recalling Bl. Jacoba's attendance at his death.
