= Lapis Lacedaemonius =

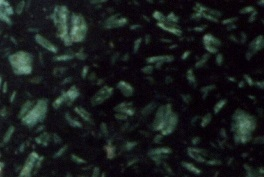
Lapis Lacedaemonius

Lapis Lacedaemonius (Latin: stone from Lacedaemon), also known as Spartan basalt, is a form of andesite or volcanic rock known today only from a single source in the village of Krokees on the Peloponnese in Greece. In addition, ancient sources mention a quarry of lapis Lacedaemonius in Taygetus. The stone has a dark green colour, speckled with elements shifting from yellow to light green. Occasionally, the speckles have crystallised in a way that creates rosette-like patterns. It is rated as having a hardness of six or higher on the Mohs scale of mineral hardness. It appears in comparatively small blocks. It is known in Italian as porfido verde antico and in German as Krokeischer Stein.

The stone is known to have been processed by Neanderthals. In slightly more recent times, lapis Lacedaemonius has been used for making Minoan sealstones and vases, both Minoan and Mycenean. It also was used as an element in decorative elements created with opus sectile technique (with examples known from Ostia Antica and Nemi) during Roman times, as well as in several churches in Rome (e.g. Santa Prassede) and in the pavement of St. Peter's Square. Its use is mentioned by Pausanias. During the Middle Ages it was employed in mosaics in e.g. Palermo, Constantinople, and Santiago de Compostela. Furthermore, Roman and Byzantine decorative stones frequently were reused up until the eighteenth century. For example, in St. Mark's Basilica, Venice and also as far away from the Mediterranean Sea as in Westminster Abbey, London.

The stone from Krokees comes from a lava dome approximately 230 million years old. Its light spots are plagioclase, which over time has turned into albite and epidote. In places, iron minerals have oxidized into hematite, giving it a reddish tone. Geologically similar rock, equally exploited during antiquity, may be found on Samothrace.
