= Historic centre of Albano Laziale =

Part of the Italian municipality of Albano Laziale

The historic centre of Albano Laziale corresponds to the territory of the first municipal decentralization district of the municipality of the same name of Albano Laziale, in the province of Rome, Lazio.

Albano was founded in the early Middle Ages on the site occupied in the imperial age by the Castra Albana, the Italic encampment of the Legio II Parthica: during the Middle Ages the city experienced troubled military and proprietary vicissitudes, disputed between the Apostolic Camera and the Savelli family. It was sacked by the Saracens in the ninth century, besieged in 1108, and razed to the ground in 1168 and 1436: since the thirteenth century, it was permanently subjected to the rule of the Savelli family, who graced the city with the title of principality. A period of splendor for the city began with the acquisition of the fiefdom by the Apostolic Camera in 1697, and the city's commercial life revived considerably in the late eighteenth century with the reopening of the Via Appia Nuova.

The historic centre of Albano Laziale is home to the municipal palace. The Albano territory also includes the administrative hamlets of Cecchina (second district) and Pavona (third district). It is also a suburbicarian diocese attested since the fourth century, the seat of the magistrate's court and the general direction of the ASL RMH.

== History ==
=== Ancient age ===
==== From the first human settlements to the republican age ====
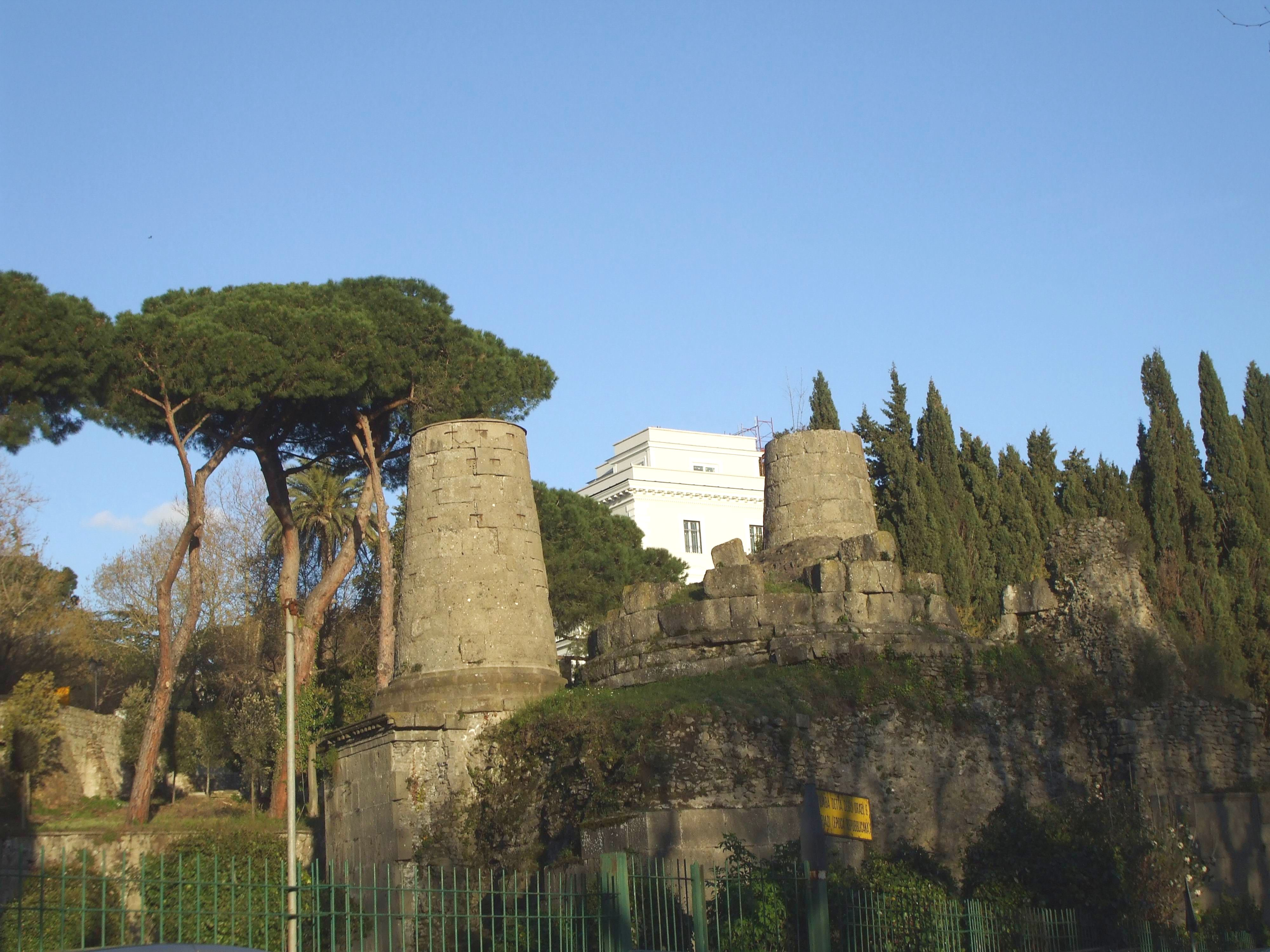
The so-called tomb "of the Horatii and Curiatii," one of the symbols of Albano. About 5.40 meters long on each side, the podium is about 3 meters high, while the four side cones (only one of which is still whole) are just over 2 meters high: their diameter is about 1.50 meters, while of the central cone only the diameter, about 3 meters, can be calculated.

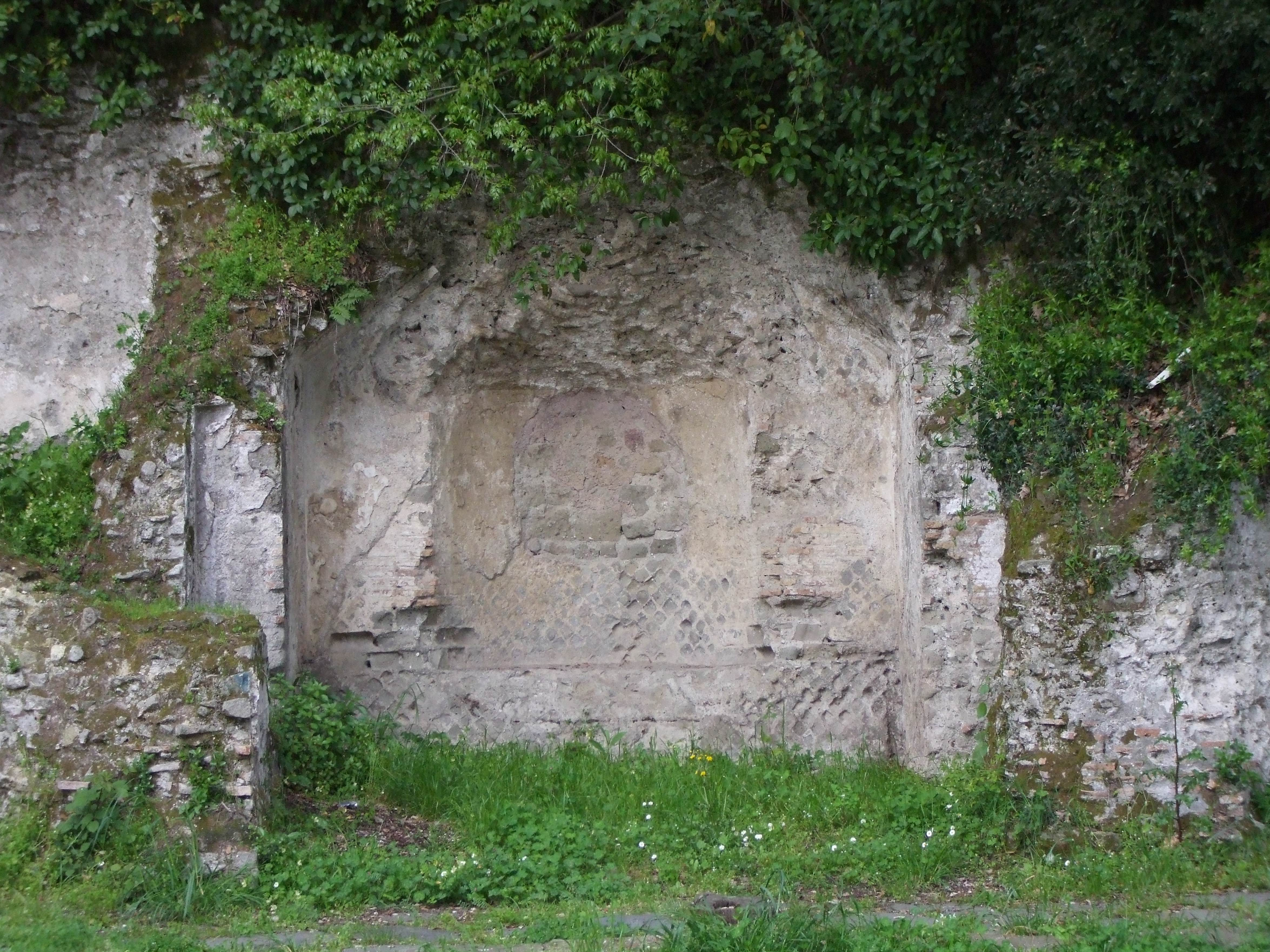
A niche from the villa of Gnaeus Pompeius Magnus in the public park of Villa Doria.

The Albano territory, together with the entire area of the Alban Hills, was subject, between about 600,000 and 20,000 years ago, to the activity of the Latium Volcano: this caused the creation of a volcanic terrain, composed largely of peperino and, to a lesser extent, tuff. The first human settlements attested in the Albano territory date back to the Iron Age, that is, to the Latium periods I and II A (1000 BC-830 B.C. circa); these are surface finds discovered in two localities (Tor Paluzzi and Colle dei Cappuccini) probable sites of as many human settlements.

In the later Latian period II B (c. 830 B.C.-770 B.C.) the first finds that can be linked to the birth of Alba Longa are attested. According to the account of Dionysius of Halicarnassus, the city would have been founded by Aeneas' son Ascanius thirty years after the founding of Lavinium, "near a mountain and a lake, occupying the space between the two." Although the archaeologist Antonio Nibby placed the site of the city on the eastern side of Lake Albano, between the localities of Costa Caselle near Marino and Pozzo Carpino in the municipality of Grottaferrata, at the foot of Monte Cavo, the most substantial archaeological remains have been found on the southern side of the lake, between the Colle dei Cappuccini and the convent of Santa Maria ad Nives of Palazzolo in the municipality of Rocca di Papa.

In the Albano territory in the locality of Selvotta and in the neighboring territory of Ariccia at the disused peperino quarries, several necropolises have also been found that can be linked to the development of Alba Longa. A new human settlement flourished at Castel Savello, attested by some burials found in the Valle Pozzo below; the settlement of Tor Paluzzi continued to exist, albeit scaled down. In the Latium III period (770 BC-730 B.C. circa) there were no substantial changes in material culture nor in the continuity of the settlements; the most important finding of this period concerns the growing hegemony of Alba Longa, which can be seen from the finds in the Via Virgilio necropolis.

The Latium IV A period (c. 730 B.C.-640 B.C.) probably saw the introduction of viticulture in Lazio: during this period Alba Longa was destroyed by Tullus Hostilius, its population deported to Rome and the Latin League subjected to Roman rule. The Alban Hills still retained some religious importance, due to the existence of the important shrines of Latian Jupiter on Monte Cavo, Diana Aricina near present-day Nemi, and Juno Sospita in Lanuvio, as well as the permanence of the surviving Albano priestly congregations in Bovillae, which from then on boasted of having succeeded Alba Longa as the Latin religious capital. After the ouster of Rome's last king Tarquinius Superbus in 510 B.C., he fled to Chiusi's lucumo Porsenna, who in 505 B.C. sent half of the Chiusi army commanded by his son Aruns against Aricia; in front of the city walls, roughly near the present church of Santa Maria della Stella on the outskirts of Albano, thus took place the Battle of Aricia, which saw the Aricines and their Cuman allies triumph over the Etruscans, who after signing peace with Rome had wanted to try to extend their rule over Aricia as well. The tomb of Aruns, who was killed in battle, has been identified by some historians with the tomb popularly attributed to the Horatii and Curiatii.

The Albano territory was traversed beginning in 312 B.C. by the Via Appia Antica, the regina viarum, commissioned by the censor Appius Claudius Caecus as a direct link between Rome and Capua. Later the road was improved (the twenty-kilometer stretch between Rome and Bovillae was paved in saxum quadratum in 293) and extended to Benevento and then to Brindisi, the gateway to Greece. Among the personalities who had villas in the Albano area in the Republican age were Gnaeus Pompeius Magnus, Quintus Aurelius, Lucius Albucius Iustus, Marcus Junius Brutus, and Publius Clodius Pulcher. Other anonymous villas have been found near the southern shore of Lake Albano and at the Albano Laziale railway station.

==== The Imperial Age ====
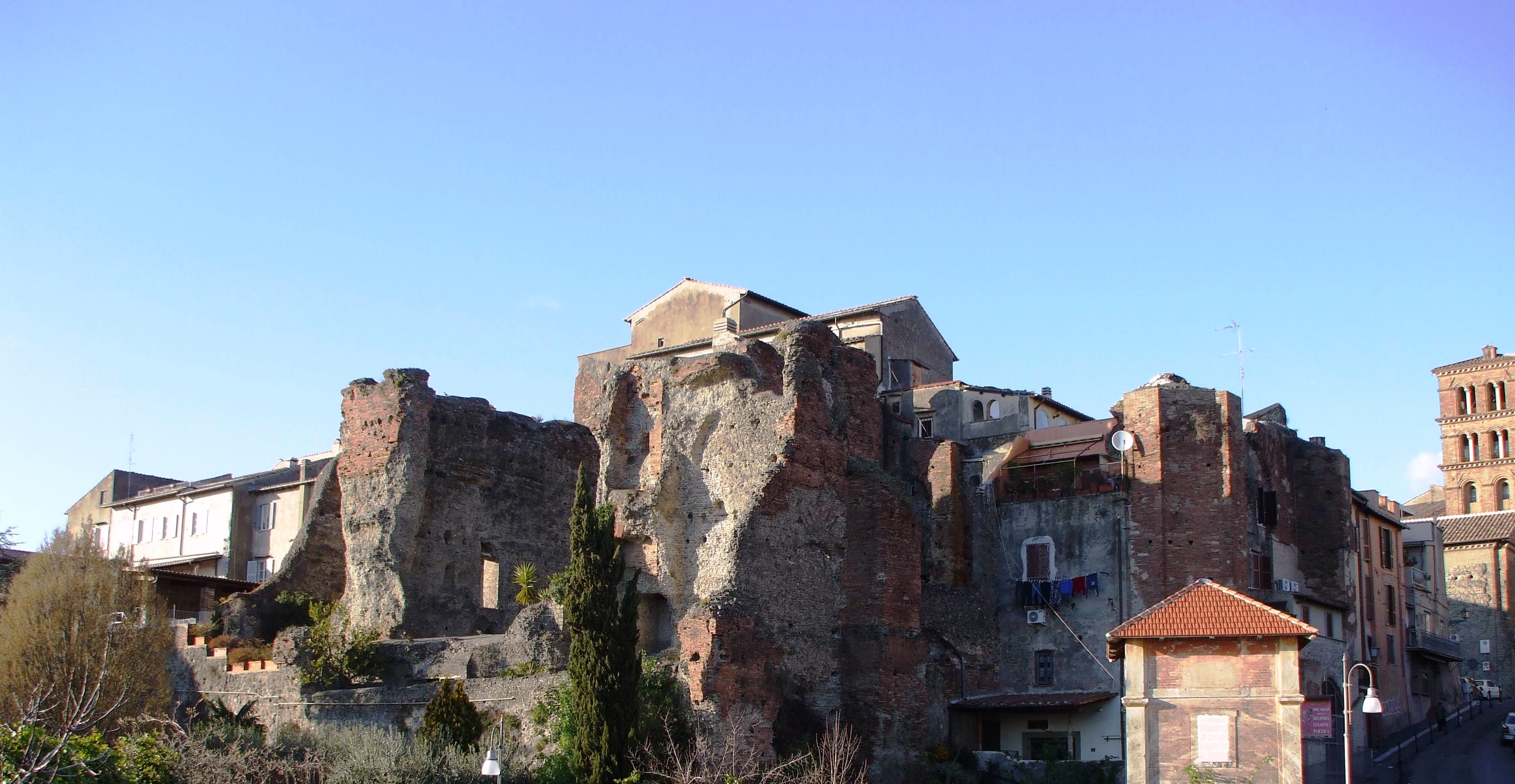
Baths of Caracalla, also nicknamed "of Cellomaio."

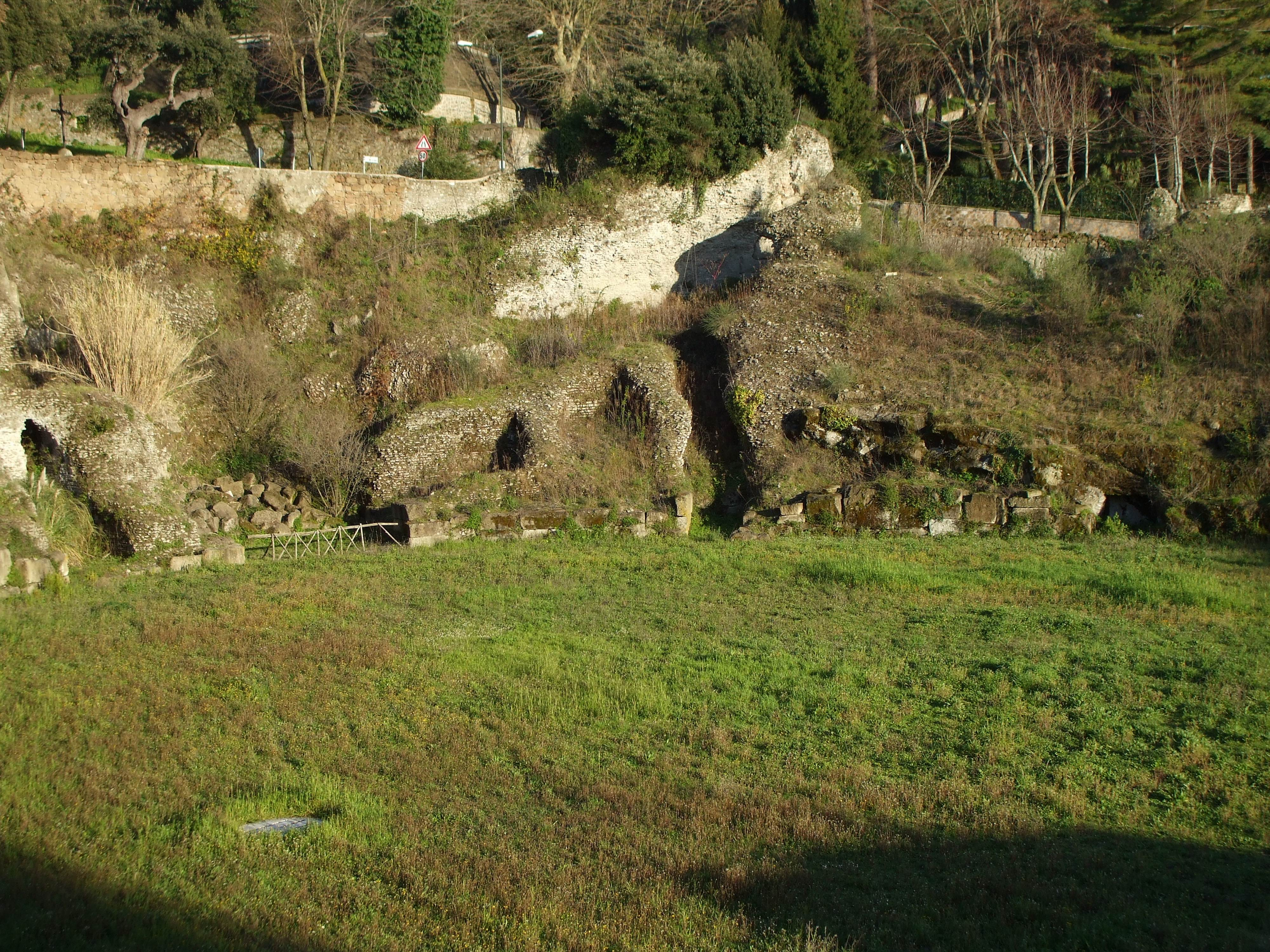
The Roman amphitheater.

In the imperial age were built the villas of Lucius Anneus Seneca or Publius Papinius Statius: however, the most imposing building constructed during this period was the "Albanum Caesarum," the colossal villa of Domitian at Castel Gandolfo, commissioned by Emperor Titus Flavius Domitian (81-96): the palace proper occupied a large part of the present Villa Barberini, in the extra-territorial complex of the Palace of Castel Gandolfo, but the properties attached to the villa covered much of the territory of the present municipalities of Albano and Castel Gandolfo, extending around the shores of Lake Albano also into the municipal territories of Marino, Rocca di Papa and Ariccia for a total of about thirteen or fourteen square kilometers.

After Domitian, his successors abandoned the villa, which was replaced as a suburban imperial residence by the more famous Hadrian's Villa in Tivoli. Septimius Severus (193-211) decided because of this decentralization to install within the imperial grounds abutting the Appian Way the Legio II Parthica, a Roman legion loyal to the emperor and charged with guarding and patrolling Rome. Thus was established the Castra Albana, the fortified city that became the residence of the legion and occupied exactly the area of the present-day municipality of Albano.

A series of buildings such as the amphitheater, the Baths of Caracalla, four gates (two remain visible today, including the Praetorian gate) and two internal buildings for use as praetorium, as well as communal dwellings, were built as a function of the Castra: the remains of all these make Albano today one of the urban centers of Lazio richest in Roman memories besides Rome itself.

The Legio II Parthica occupied the castra of Albano at least until the middle of the third century. Later, the Liber Pontificalis states that Emperor Constantine I (306-337), during the pontificate of Pope Sylvester I (314-335), founded a cathedral of St. John the Baptist in Albano, providing it with liturgical furnishings and substantial property in the Albano territory, including abandoned castra.

Christianity had already been announced in the Albano territory probably even by St. Peter and St. Paul: certainly the presence of Christian communities is quite ancient, as evidenced by the catacombs of St. Senator near the church of Santa Maria della Stella: dating from the fourth or fifth century, they were kept in use until the ninth century.

Other ancient evidences of the Christian presence in Albano are a Christian oratory located within the remains of the Republican villa in the public park of Villa Doria, and a Christian oratory discovered within the "vomitoria" of the Roman amphitheater in Via San Francesco d'Assisi.

=== Middle Ages ===
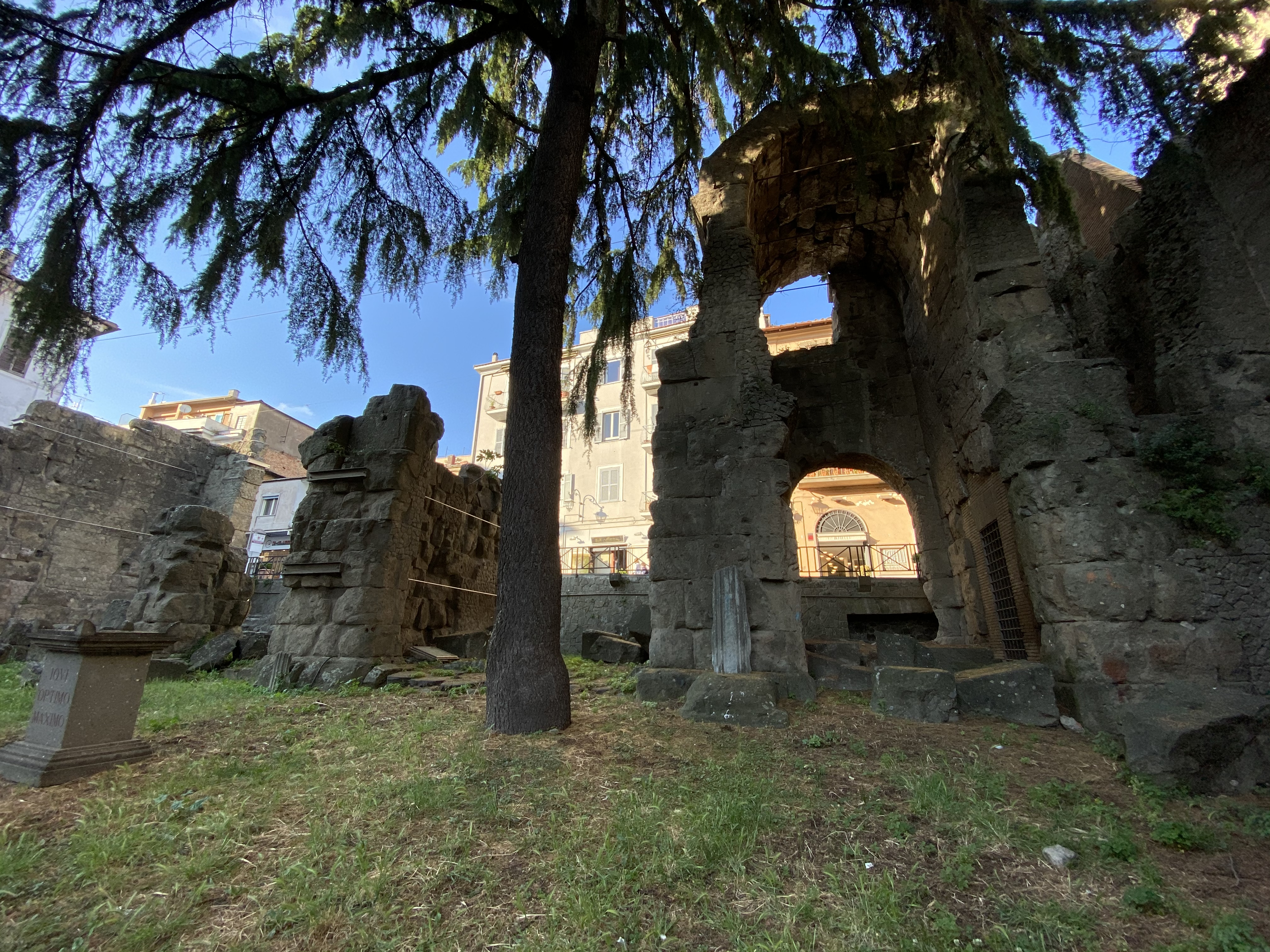
The Porta Praetoria of the Castra Albana.

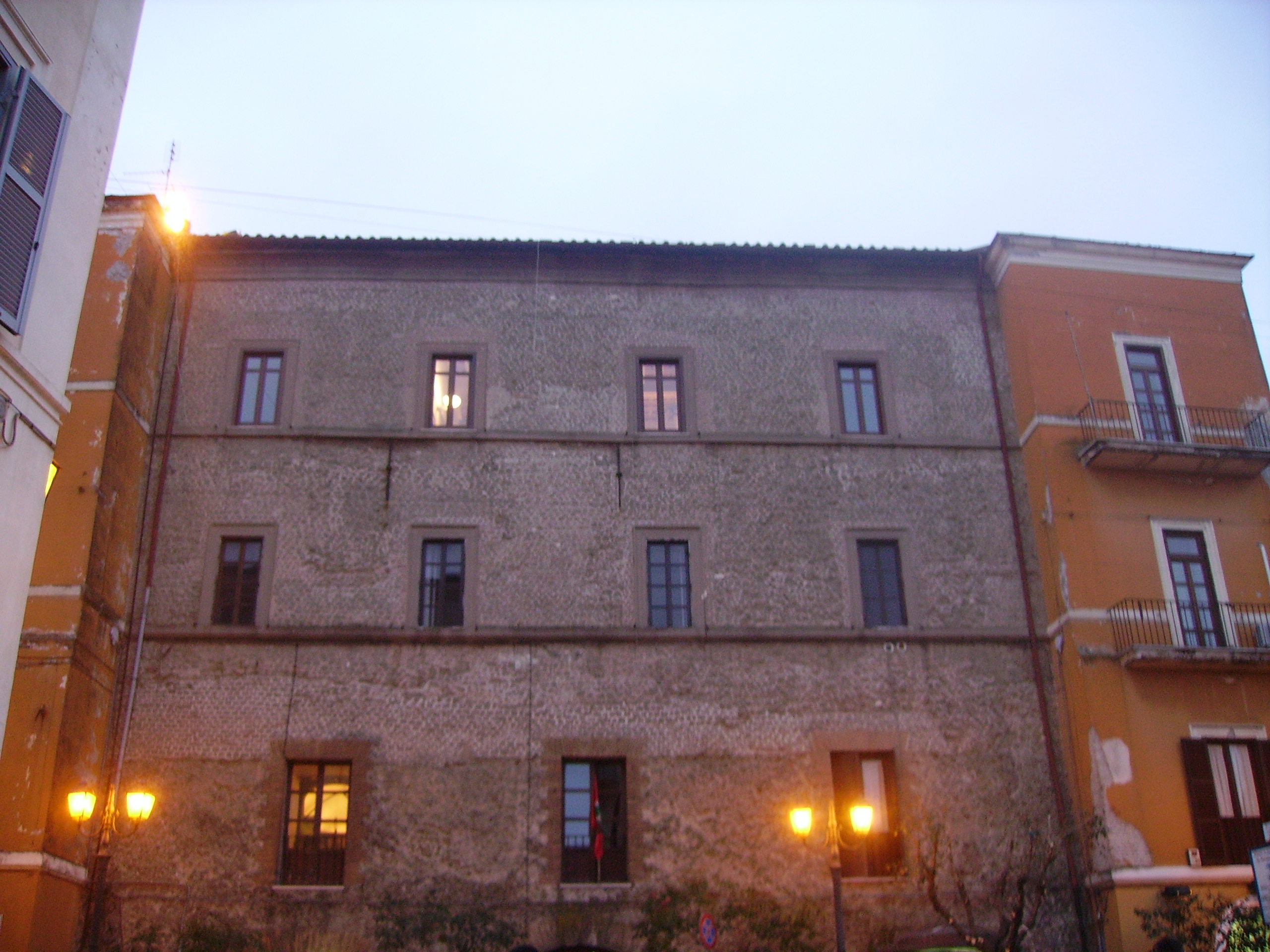
The facade of Palazzo Savelli on St. Peter's Square: the two quadrangular side towers are highlighted.

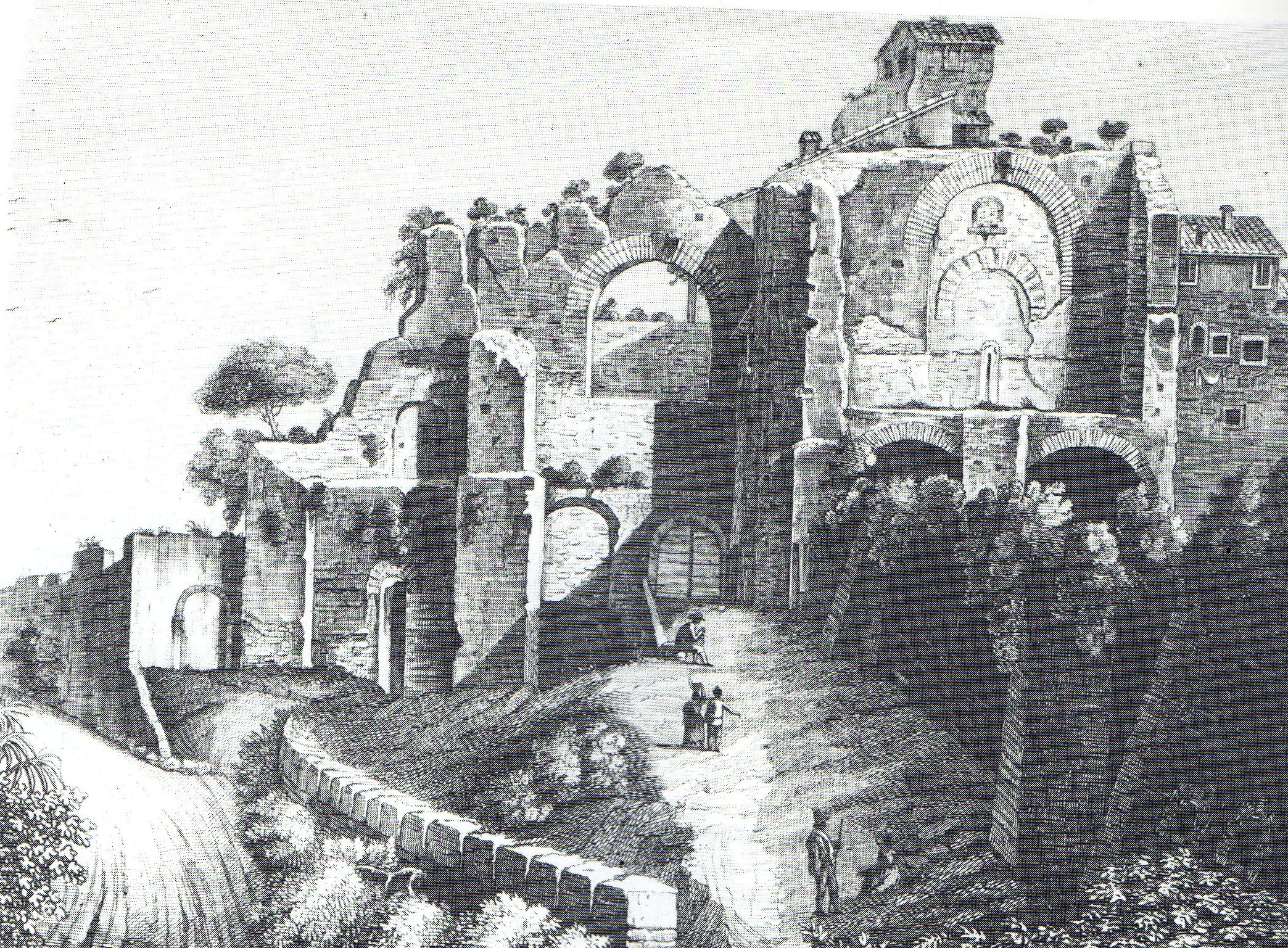
The Baths of Caracalla at Cellomaio in an anonymous 18th-century engraving.

==== From the fall of the Roman Empire to the 12th century ====
The court historian of the Byzantine emperor Justinian, Procopius of Caesarea, reports that during the Gothic War (535-554) Albano was a πολισματα ("polismata"), i.e., a fortified place occasionally defended by permanent troops.

Around the 8th century, Marian worship probably began at the sanctuary of Santa Maria della Rotonda, although the first consecration of the shrine is dated to 1060. By the 6th century, on the other hand, the church of St. Paul had already been built, carved out of a hall of the Baths of Caracalla.

In August 846 the Ager Romanus was devastated by a raid of Saracens, who went so far as to sack the basilica of St. Peter in the Vatican and the basilica of St. Paul outside the walls, before falling back along the Appian Way "amid indescribable ruins": Albano and Aricia were sacked. The Mohammedans plundered Latium and Campania from their fortified position on the Garigliano until they were repulsed by a Christian confederate army in 916.

Otto I of Saxony in 964 donated Albano, Ariccia and three other surrounding castles to Virginio Savelli: however, this donation is believed by some historians to be a forgery later made by the Savelli themselves to justify a usurpation of ecclesiastical rights over Albano. For that matter, the practice was also common among other Roman baronial families to legitimize their purchase of other fiefs in the Ager Romanus.

When Pope Paschal II moved to Benevento in 1108 to settle some territorial issues in the Terra di Lavoro, he thought it best to entrust the tranquility of Latium to Ptolemy of the Counts of Tusculum, who was not slow to rebel against papal authority. The pope was forced to rush to Rome, and probably suffered victoriously a siege at Albano, though to reward the people of Albano for their sufferings he dispensed them from paying taxes on chivalry and milling: this privilege is preserved in an inscription placed in the cathedral of San Pancrazio, and studied by the eighteenth-century historian Giovanni Antonio Ricci. Paschal II preserved the loyalty of the people of Albano even in 1116, when he was forced to flee to Albano because of the revolt of the Roman noble family of Pierleoni.

Frederick I "Barbarossa" of the Holy Roman Empire sent an army to Latium commanded by Rainald of Dassel, archbishop of Cologne, to help Raino of the Counts of Tusculum, a fierce Ghibelline besieged by the anti-imperial Romans in Tusculum: Romans and Imperials thus fought the Battle of Monte Porzio (May 29, 1167), fought near Tusculum in the present-day municipality of Monte Porzio Catone. The Romans had the largest army they had fielded in centuries, and were numerically superior to the Imperials by twenty to one: nevertheless, they still lost the battle. Albano, Tusculum, Tivoli and other "small towns" in Latium were not slow to side with the imperials, a circumstance that was not forgotten by the Romans: after the retreat of the imperial army, Albano was razed to the ground by the Romans in 1168, and Tusculum suffered the same fate in 1191.

==== From the 13th century to the destruction of 1436 ====
In 1203 Pope Innocent III gave the cardinal bishops of the suburbicarian diocese of Albano the possession of the palatium and some churches in the Albano territory, so that they would not be ruined given the desolation of the ancient city: on August 9, 1217, Cardinal Paio Galvão obtained from Pope Honorius III the confirmation of the bishop's power over the "Civitatem Albanensem cum Burgo, Thermis Monte, qui dicitur Sol[is] et Luna, Palatio" and their adjacencies and dependencies. However, the Savellis succeeded in having the fief invested by Frederick II of Swabia in 1221, and it is probable that from this time they maintained firm control of it, despite yet another confirmation of the bishop's rights over Albano promulgated in 1278 by Pope Nicholas III.

Cardinal Giacomo Savelli, since 1285 Pope Honorius IV, founded the Abbey of St. Paul in 1282, entrusting it to the Guglielmini fathers and endowing it with substantial properties in the Albano territory and around Lake Albano (such as the picturesque hermitage of Sant'Angelo in Lacu). In the thirteenth century, also thanks to the seigniory of the Savelli family, there are signs of a rebirth of the city: in addition to the foundation of the abbey, one of the first "guardianìe" of the Franciscan Order is attested in Albano, active at the then falling cathedral of San Pancrazio, and in 1316 the sanctuary of Santa Maria della Rotonda was consecrated for the second time, at the work of Augustinian nuns. In addition, the city was provided with a fortification system, as the dating of Palazzo Savelli to this era would attest.

During the war between Pope Eugene IV and the Colonna family, in October 1434 the papal commander Orsino Orsini pressed the rebel army led by the mercenary captain Antonio da Pontedera as far as below the Borghetto di Grottaferrata, Marino and Albano, the first and last castles hospitable to the rebel because they were owned by the Savelli family, allies of the Colonna family who instead ruled Marino: Cardinal Giovanni Maria Vitelleschi, commander-in-chief of the papal army, reconquered Rome (from which the pope had been driven out) on October 25, and on March 31, 1436 arrived at the Borghetto di Grottaferrata, which was destroyed: Then, the cardinal passed by Marino without assaulting it and raided the Savelli fiefdoms along the Appian Way, namely Castel Gandolfo, Albano and Castel Savello, razing them to the ground: passing through Rocca Priora he then broke the delay and attacked the Colonna family directly in the Valle Latina. The war ended with the conquest of Palestrina on August 18, 1436, and its savage destruction by Cardinal Vitelleschi.

=== Modern Age ===
==== From Eugenius IV to Innocent XII ====
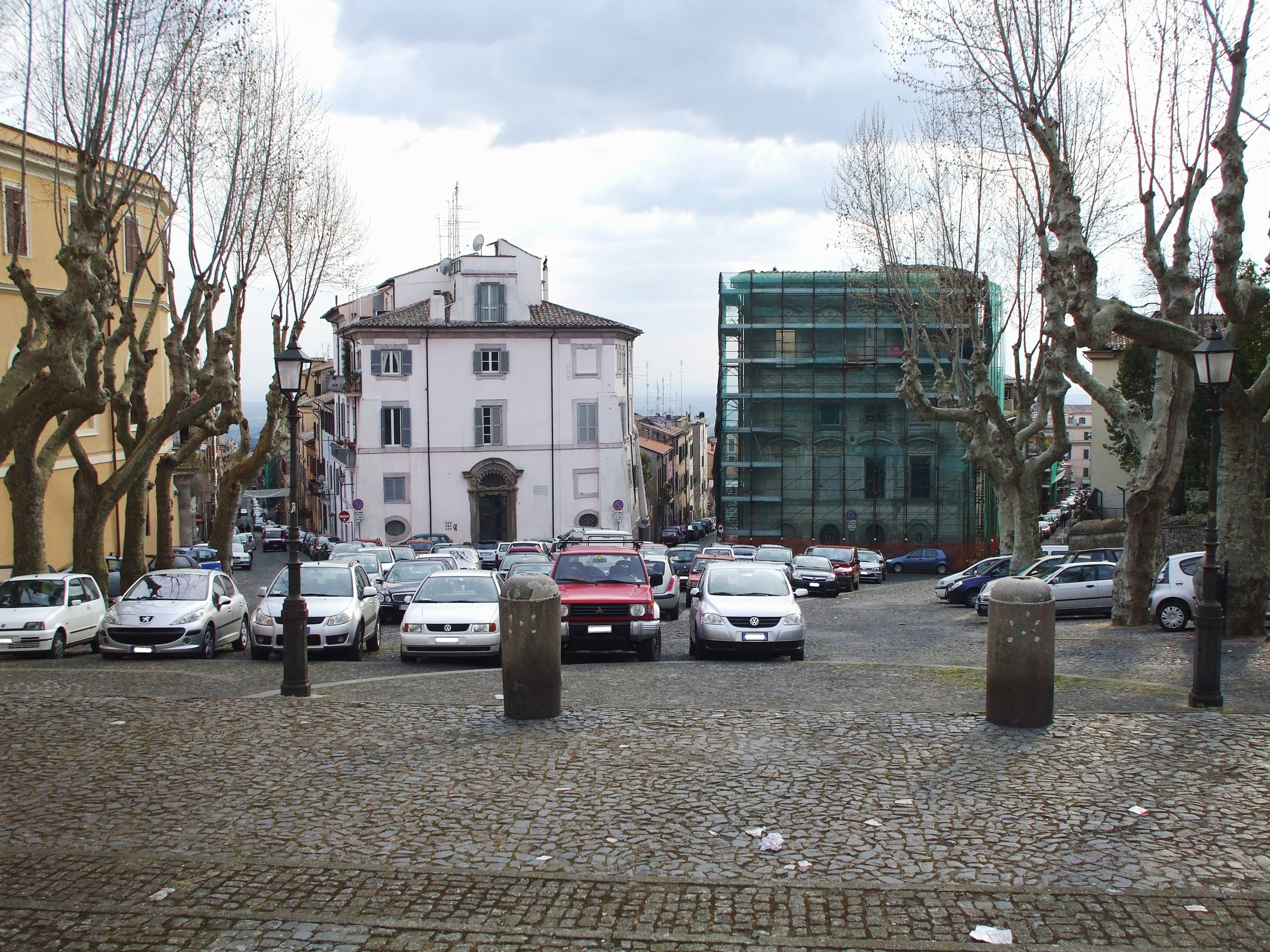
Piazza San Paolo: the "trident."

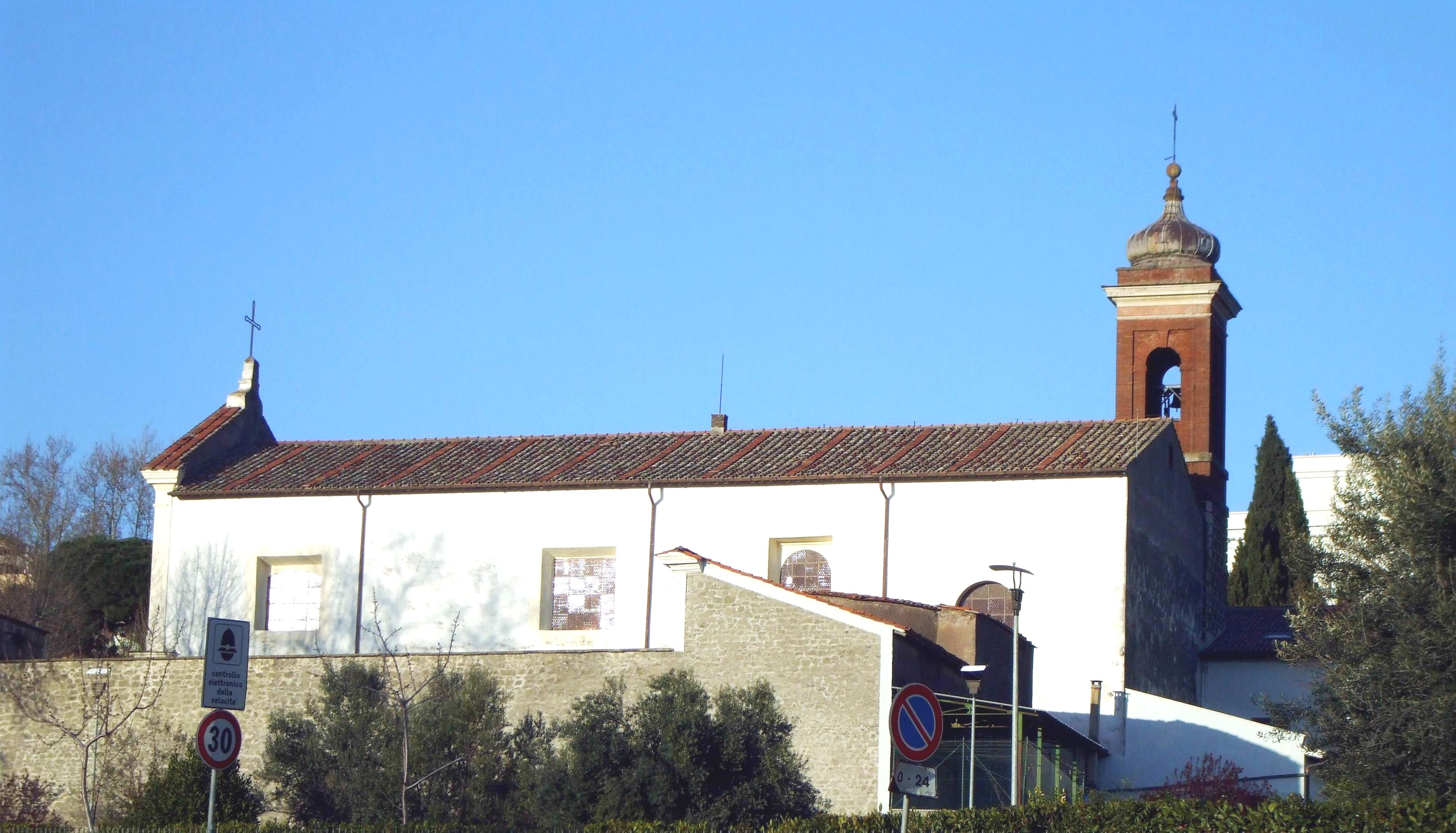
The church of Santa Maria della Stella.

After the destruction of Albano, Eugene IV granted to the Hieronymite fathers the sanctuary of Santa Maria della Rotonda and the abbey of San Paolo (1444), and confiscated among the goods of the Apostolic Camera the fiefdom: this state of affairs remained until 1448, when with the death of the pontiff the Savelli family returned to rule Albano.

Pope Pius II wanted to visit the archaeological ruins visible in Albano in the properties of the Abbey of St. Paul during his trip to the Alban Hills in 1462: other stops were Genzano di Roma, the convent of Santa Maria ad Nives of Palazzolo and Monte Cavo.

During the war between Pope Sixtus IV and Ferdinand I of Naples in 1482 the Alban Hills were the main scene of clashes: on June 5 the Neapolitans had occupied the Borghetto di Grottaferrata and from that position began to plunder the Ager Romanus together with troops mobilized by the Colonna and Savelli families. On July 16 the Neapolitan commander-in-chief Alfonso II, Duke of Calabria, decided to "discharge" the Colonna allies and occupied Marino, and probably at the same time Albano was also occupied, where a soldiers' bivouac was set up at the Abbey of St. Paul until the Neapolitan retreat that followed the Battle of Campomorto (August 21, 1482).

The city was again embroiled in another local conflict between Sixtus IV and the Orsini on one side and the Colonna and Savelli on the other and occupied by the papal commander Paolo Orsini in 1483. The peace, signed on January 2, 1485, by the newly elected Pope Innocent VIII, established a return to the status quo ante bellum.

Pope Alexander VI, taking advantage of the descent into Italy of the French army sent by Louis XI of France, ordered the banishment, excommunication, and seizure of the property of his adversary families of Colonna, Savelli, and Estouteville, and donated the seized fiefs along with other ecclesiastical fiefs to his own nephews Rodrigo and Giovanni Borgia, aged two and three respectively, with the Papal Brief "Coelestis altitudinis potentiae" of October 1, 1501. Albano belonged to Rodrigo, for whom due to his minor age a procurator was appointed in the person of Cardinal Archbishop of Cosenza Francesco Borgia. The Savellis did not return to the possession of their fiefs until 1503, the year of the death of Alexander VI and the ascension to the papacy of Pope Pius III.

A period of relative growth for Albano followed: in 1560 the first restorations since time immemorial were made to the cathedral of San Pancrazio, in 1565 the church of Santa Maria della Stella was founded with the adjoining convent of the Carmelite fathers, in 1591 the cathedral rents and the subdivision of the city into parishes were reordered, in 1615 the church of St. Bonaventure and the convent of the Friars Minor Capuchin were founded, in 1628 the bishop's seminary and in 1631 the convent of the Poor Clare nuns on what is now Piazza Pia. In 1605 the Savelli family granted new statutes to the fiefdom.

In the mid-seventeenth century, the "trident of streets" of Albano Laziale was drawn on the lands of the abbey of San Paolo, around which rose the new district of Borgo San Paolo, which was populated with monumental buildings such as Palazzo Rospigliosi (1667) and especially Palazzo Pamphilj (1708–1717).

The Savelli's economic situation, however, was not good: in 1662 they were forced to sell the fief of Ariccia to the Chigi for 358,000 pontifical scudi, and in 1697 the Savelli's creditors appealed to Pope Innocent XII to force Prince Giulio Savelli to pay his debts. Chroniclers relate that the pope summoned the prince, who responded with bravado, heedless of threats of imprisonment or beheading for default (he jokingly said that in the latter case he would get a bronze head): Thus the sale by auction of the fiefdom of Albano, worth 440,000 pontifical scudi, was carried out, and it was shortly confiscated by the Apostolic Camera.

The ancient Savelli lineage of Albano died out with Giulio.

==== The rule of the Apostolic Camera: 1697-1798 ====
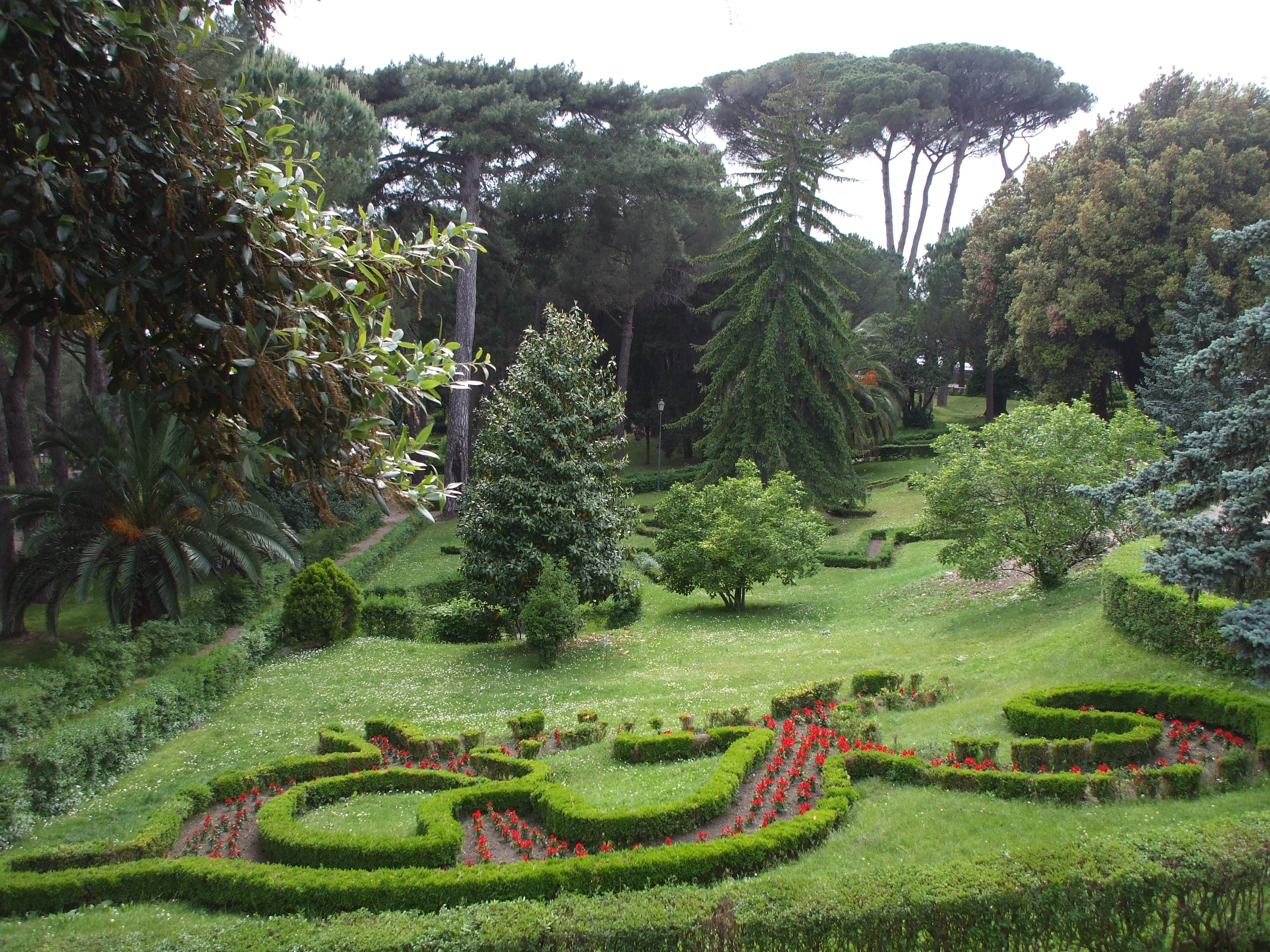
A glimpse of the current public park of Villa Doria.

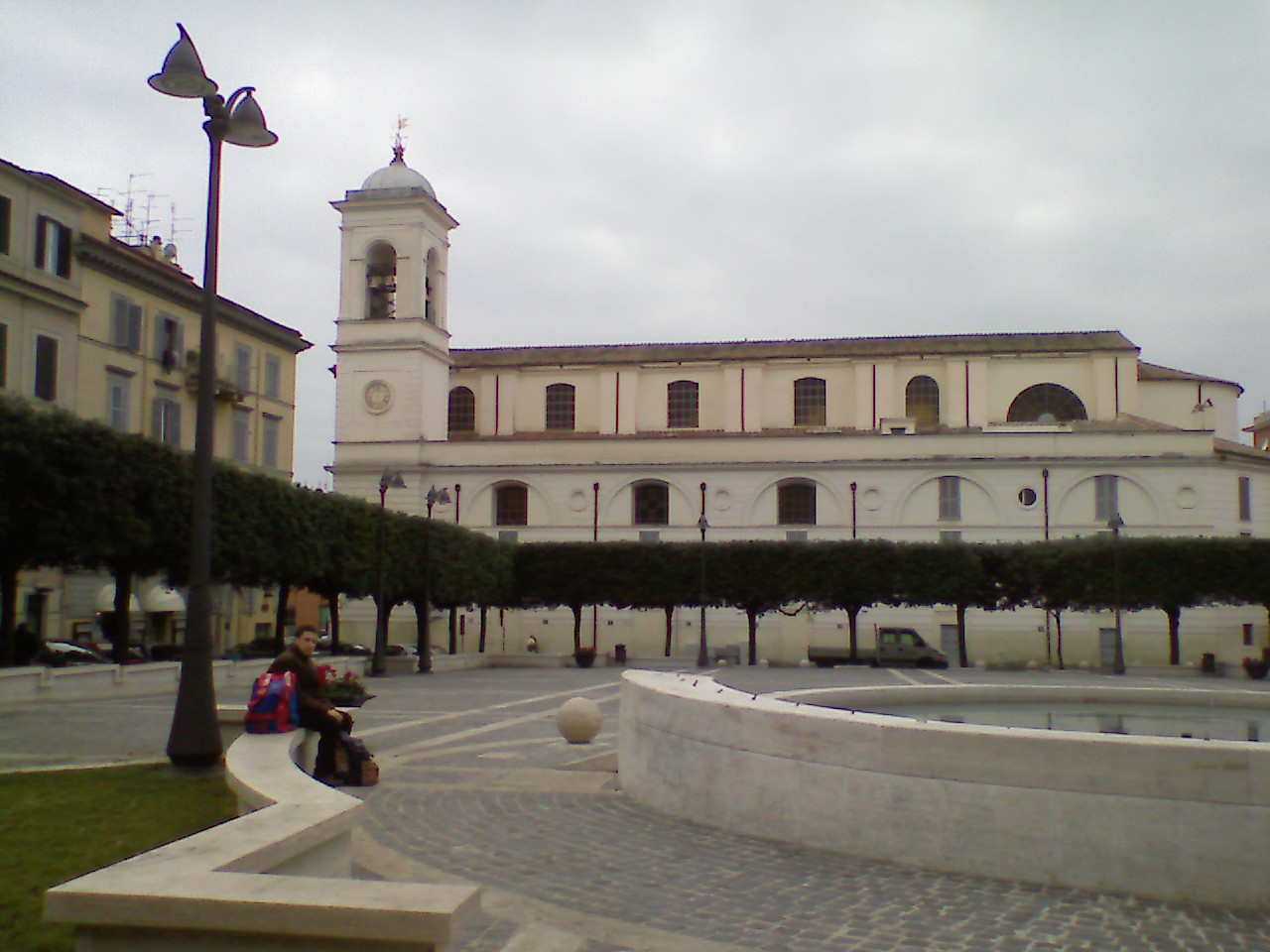
Piazza Pia: in the background, the cathedral of San Pancrazio.

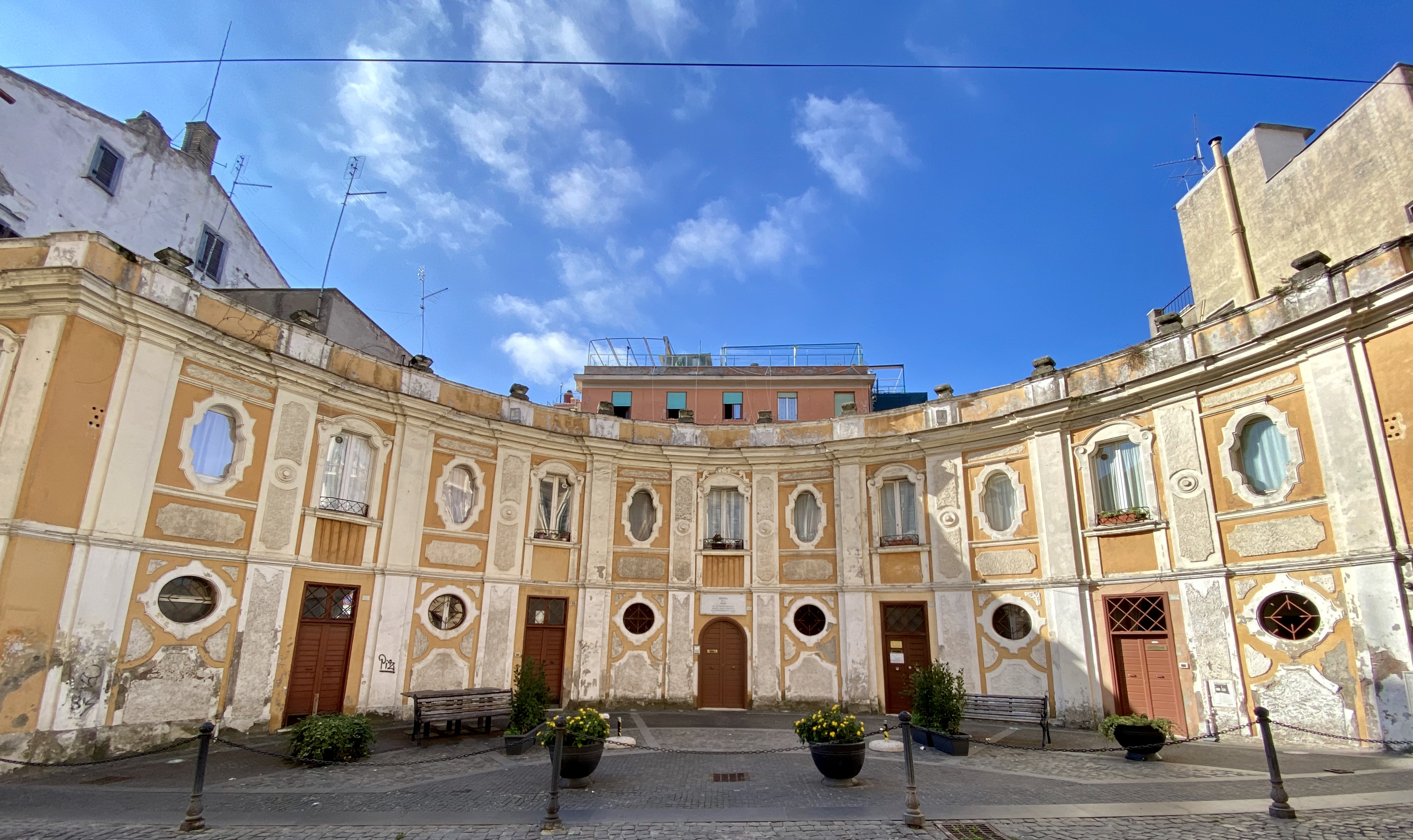
The Exedra of Peace on Alcide De Gasperi Street, in front of the Bishop's Palace.

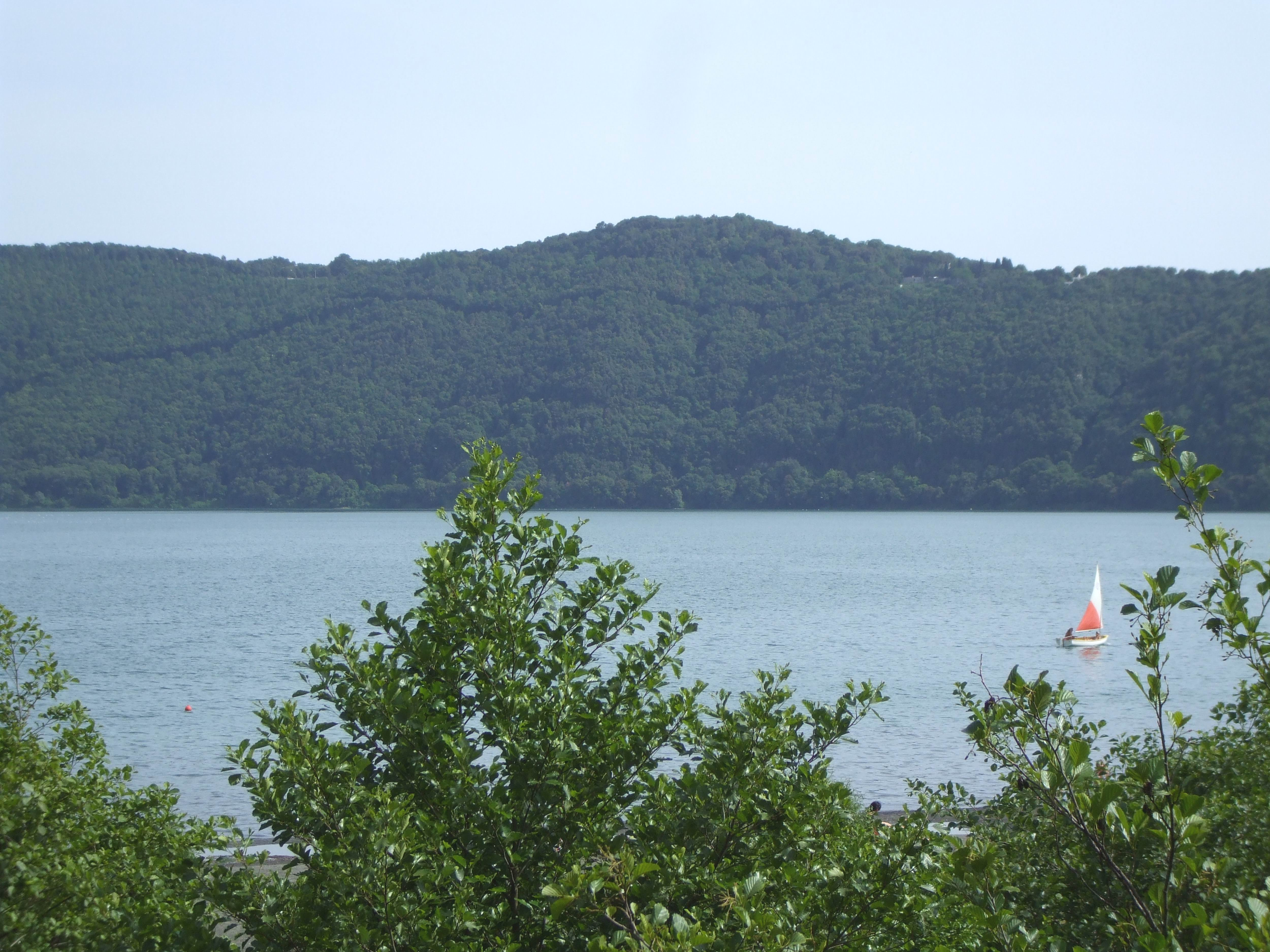
Capuchin Hill from Lake Albano.

The period beginning with the acquisition of the city to the direct rule of the Catholic Church is recognized as the happiest in Albano's history. Palazzo Savelli was converted back to the residence of the papal governor but also of illustrious guests of the pope, including James Francis Edward Stuart, pretender to the Kingdom of Great Britain in exile in Rome, and his son Henry Benedict Stuart, Duke of York, created cardinal bishop of the suburbicarian diocese of Frascati.

In the early eighteenth century there arose Villa Doria, Villa Altieri, Palazzo Corsini, and Palazzo Lercari, donated by the founding cardinal of the same name as a residence to the cardinal bishops of Albano in 1757: from the end of the eighteenth century the titular cardinal bishops would stay in their see for up to six months a year. The cathedral of San Pancrazio was restored between 1719 and 1722, an intervention that outlined the current late Baroque facade. In 1747 an Albano female religious order was established, founded in 1724 by Sister Maria Maggiori, the Oblate Sisters of Jesus and Mary, who occupied the present convent located in the Cellomaio district from 1735.

Perhaps the most important event of the modern age in Albano was the reopening of the Via Appia Nuova, begun by Pope Pius VI in 1777 and completed by 1780.

Pius VI, in order to meet the war expenses and the huge economic demands (36 million Italian lire and 100 works of art) made by Napoleon Bonaparte to the Papal States first with the Armistice of Bologna and then with the Treaty of Tolentino (Feb. 19, 1797) in 1795 thought of selling Albano: the Prince of Piombino Antonio Maria Boncompagni-Ludovisi, the Banco di Santo Spirito and the Santo Monte di Pietà participated in the auction, making an offer of 300,000 pontifical scudi: in the end, however, the Pope preferred to take out a loan from some Genoese bankers.

==== The Roman Republic and the Napoleonic occupation: 1798-1814 ====
On February 9, 1798, Rome was occupied by the French revolutionary army commanded by General Louis Alexandre Berthier: on February 15 at the Roman Forum the Roman Republic was solemnly proclaimed. On the Alban Hills, Albano, Frascati and Velletri proclaimed themselves "sister republics" on February 18, and Marino in early March.

The Albano municipal republican government was very active in the first months of the Roman republican period: on Feb. 18 it declared abolished "all the attributes, powers, faculties and rights which by the vile and fierce Oligarchy of the dead Government had been assigned and ascribed to its appointed Ministers," places of asylum in churches, all "exemptions and jurisdictions" which obstructed the law; on February 19, the tree of liberty was planted in what is now Antonio Gramsci Square, the affiliation of the Albano Republic with the Roman Republic was proclaimed; on February 22, the millstone tax, which had risen in 1798 to 55 baiocchi, was abolished. However, problems soon began: as early as the first day of its existence the republican government took care to prohibit the export out of the municipality of foodstuffs, while between February 21 and 22 the municipal government was forced to mortgage some former public property to support the population.

On February 20, 1798, the inhabitants of Trastevere rose up against the French and the Roman Republic, and the reactionary uprising quickly spread outside the capital: Albano, Velletri, Castel Gandolfo, Nemi and Lanuvio rose up, Ariccia and Genzano di Roma kept calm, while Marino and Frascati remained on the side of the French. The reactionaries began an attempted march on Rome on February 28: there were about 2,000 of them, and they clashed with the French army commanded by General Joachim Murat on the Appian Way in Marino territory, between Frattocchie and Due Santi: the so-called Battle of Frattocchie ended in a French victory. Murat occupied and sacked Castel Gandolfo, and then marched on Albano, which offered an attempt at resistance before surrendering and being sacked by the French. On March 1, 1798, Murat returned to Rome, "received with supreme applause and accompanied by the universal cheers of the people": he brought with him "the spoils of the slain rebels," namely "copper basins, cauldrons, frying pans, rolls of cloth, blankets, sheets, chickens and donkeys," which made the triumphal entry "a comic and pitiful scene at the same time".

After the reactionary attempt, the Albano Republic continued its existence as if nothing had happened: on March 13 seven companies of the "National Guard" were formed, consisting of nine men each; on March 14 the problems of grain supply continued, so much so that on March 27 "bulletins" had to be instituted; that is, ration cards. The municipal government saw to the establishment of prices for the most widely consumed goods, and on March 26 a "general requisition of oil" was carried out hidden by the owners to sell it at a higher price outside the municipality.

At the same time, Albano revolutionaries were also concerned with the necessary restoration of St. Pancras Cathedral. Further work on the cathedral, and especially on the crumbling bell tower, was carried out during the Napoleonic occupation, between 1806 and 1809. On the other hand, the French did not hesitate to strip even the venerated Marian image of Our Lady of the Rotunda of its accumulated valuables (as also happened at other Marian shrines in the area, most notably the sanctuary of St. Mary of Galloro).

=== Contemporary age ===
==== From the "first Restoration" to the end of the 19th century ====
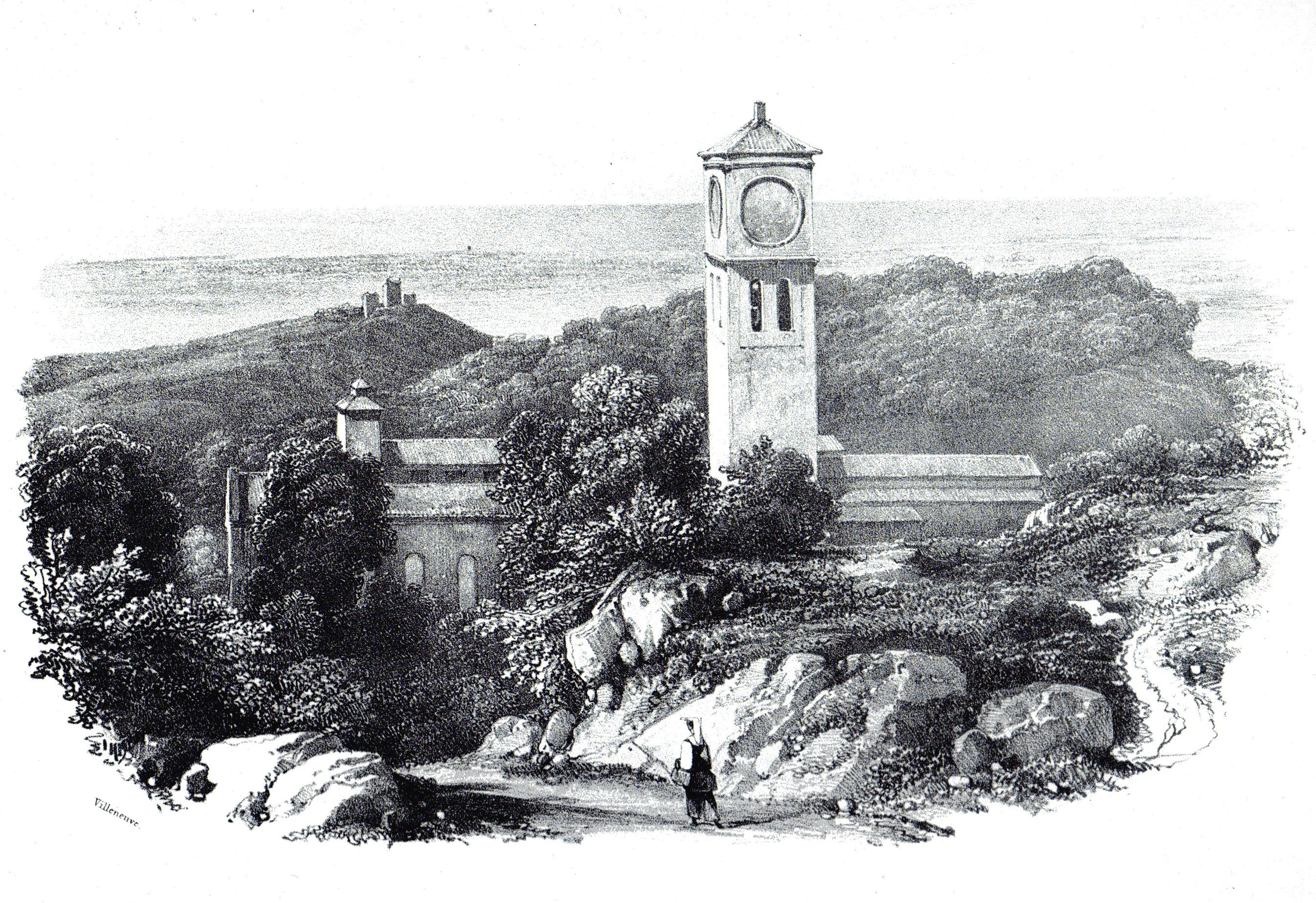
In the foreground, the bell tower of the church of San Paolo, and in the background an improbable view of the ruins of Castel Savello in a 19th-century engraving by Villeneuve preserved at the Albano Laziale Civic Museum.

Two telluric movements were recorded in Albano and the Albano area in 1829 (without serious damage to persons or property, so much so that salvation was attributed to the Madonna della Rotonda) and in 1850 (the seismic swarm, after the main tremor of December 4, continued for eight months): but the main calamity that struck Albano in the nineteenth century was the cholera epidemic of 1867. Among the illustrious victims was Cardinal Bishop Lodovico Altieri, who rushed to the city to take charge of the situation. Albano was, from the nineteenth century onwards, due to its geographical location close to Rome and the direct connection represented by the Appian Way, an important resort for the nobility (often deposed sovereigns) and the Roman middle and upper middle classes: Albano's other distinguished guests have included Wilhelm II of Germany, Margherita of Savoy, Manuel II of Portugal, Maria Luisa of Bourbon-Spain, Charles IV of Spain, Charles Emmanuel IV of Savoy, Giuseppe Garibaldi and, in more recent times, Farouk of Egypt.

After the capture of Rome on September 20, 1870, and the annexation of Lazio to the Kingdom of Italy, Bernardino Silvestroni was elected the first mayor after the unification in Albano. In 1884 running water was brought to the city, and in the circumstance the "Cisternoni" from the Roman era were reactivated, which remained in use until 1912.

In the last years of the nineteenth century, the peasants' struggle against the semi-feudal exploitation of landowners also began in the Roman Castles, less intense than in northern Italy but certainly stronger than the passive acceptance of exploitation present in southern Italy. In 1882 the Società Operaia Mutuo Soccorso (Workers' Mutual Aid Society) was founded in Albano, with 135 registered members; already in 1889 demonstrations for universal suffrage were being organized in the city, while the Italian Socialist Party was being organized locally, so much so that in 1896 the first Roman Socialist convention was held in Marino, with the participation of local sections from Rome and the Castles.

==== The 20th century ====
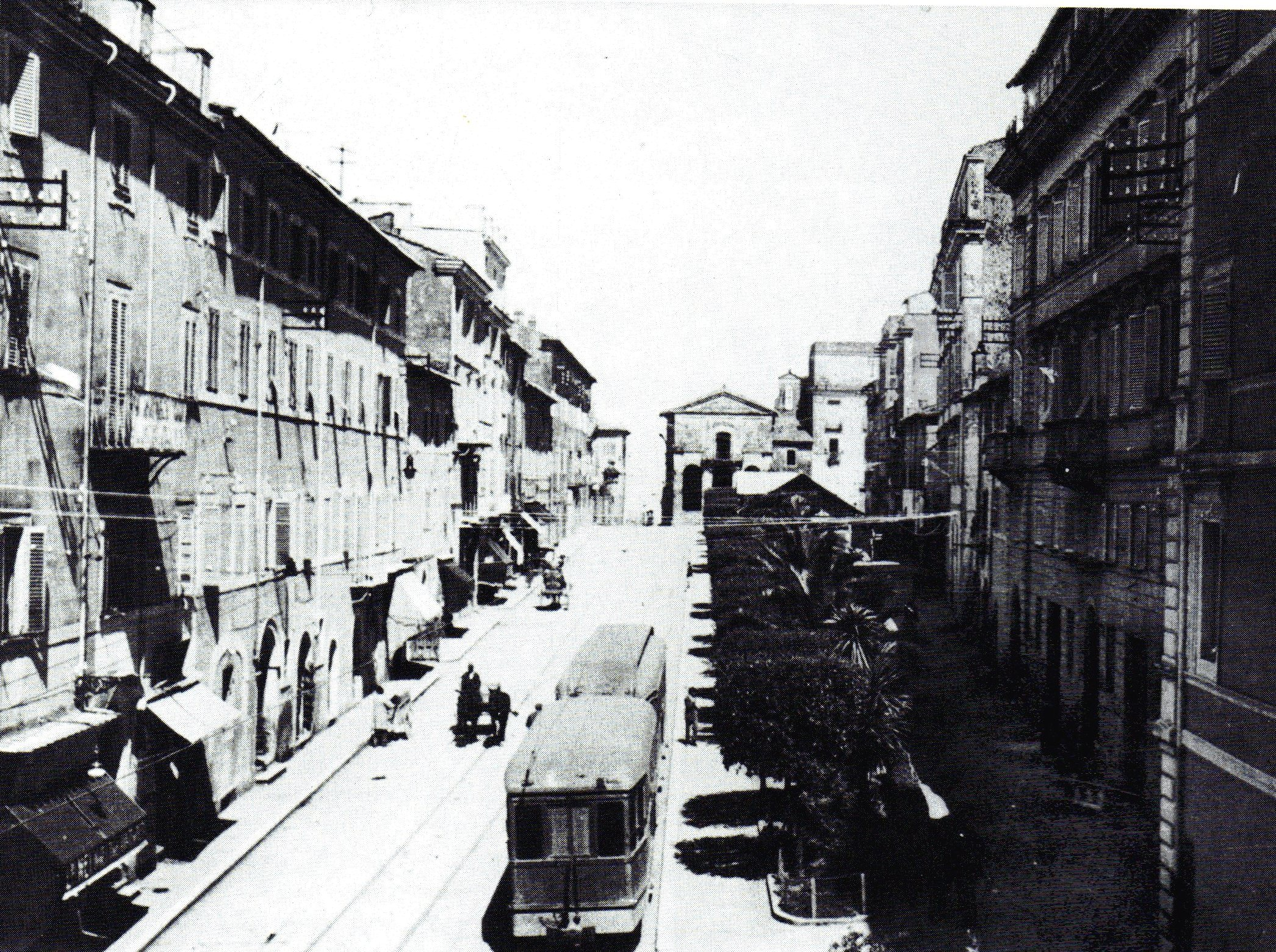
The present-day Corso Giacomo Matteotti in a photo postcard dated after the opening of the Tramways of the Roman Castles (1906) but before the demolition of the church of San Rocco (in the background) and Palazzo Doria for the opening of Piazza Giuseppe Mazzini (1951).

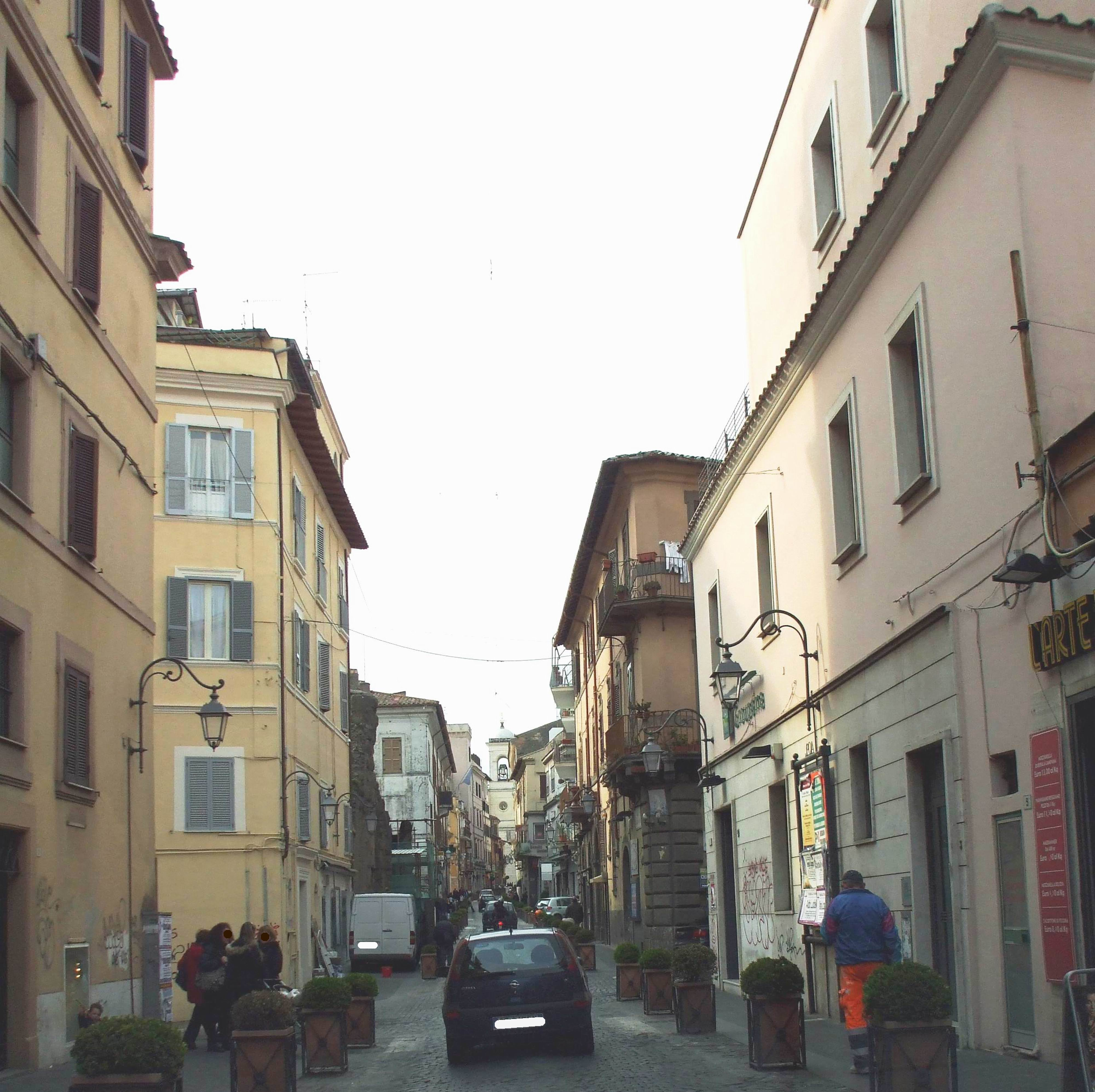
Alcide De Gasperi street. In the background, the cathedral of San Pancrazio.

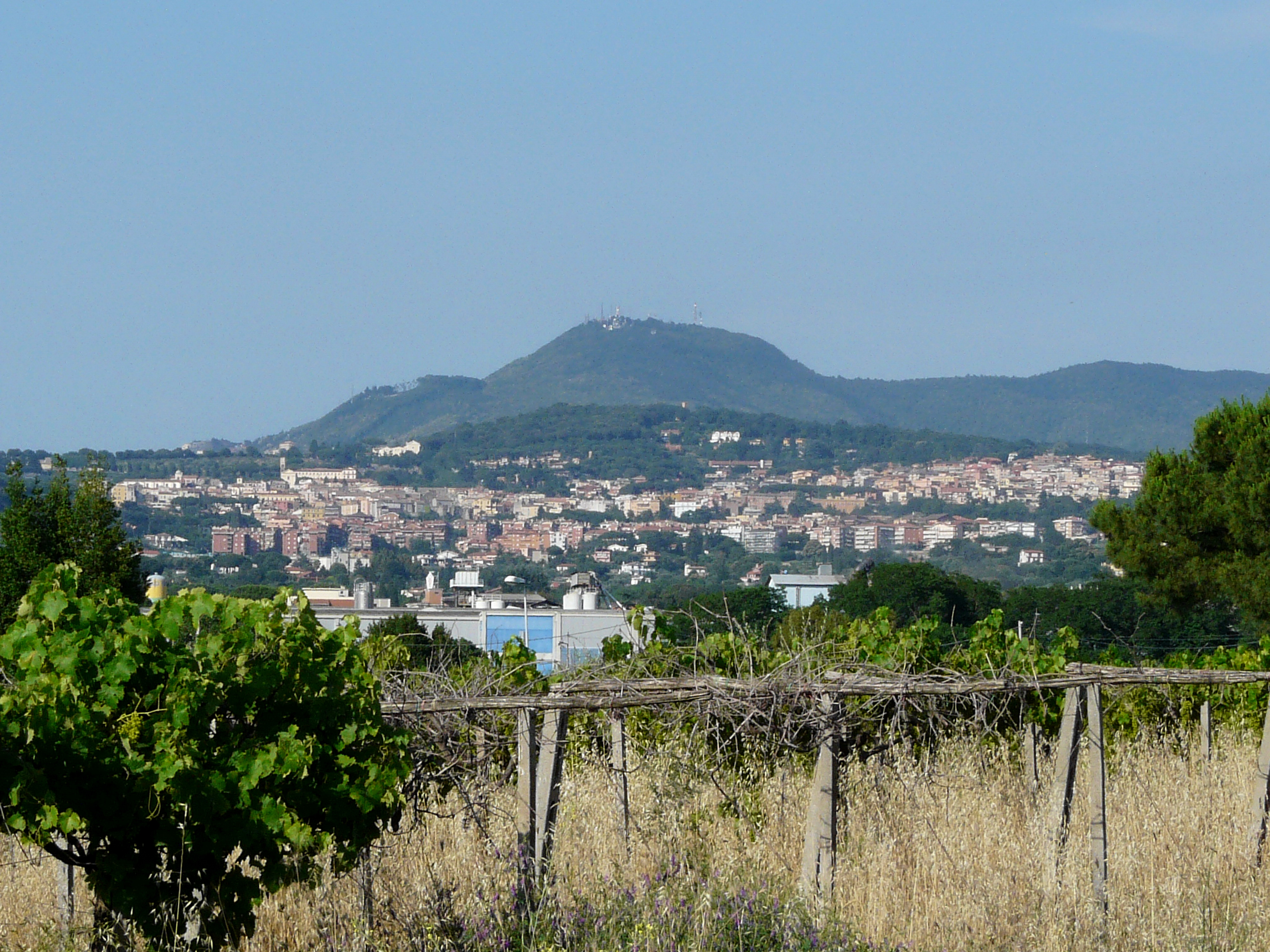
The center of Albano seen from Cecchina and, in the background, Monte Cavo.

===== From the turn of the century to the fascist dictatorship =====
In 1897 the peasants of Albano organized one of the first land invasions in Lazio, occupying some land in Santa Palomba and Cancelliera: in the latter locality, 50 hectares were occupied by the peasants in 1903. The main exponents of Albano's socialism were two ex-Republicans, Luigi Sabatini (who was mayor) and Augusto Bianchi.

In September 1917 the local congress of peasant leagues was held in Albano, but in 1918 the Spanish flu spread, against the spread of which the socialist junta took effective solutions. When World War I ended, the peasant struggle centered against the use of prisoners of war, which had already been used in the archaeological excavation of the Roman amphitheater in Albano Laziale led by archaeologist Giuseppe Lugli: two Albano landowners were accused of using them on one of their estates in Solforate, near Pomezia. In addition to prisoners of war, another source of cheap labor for the owners were foreign seasonal workers, mainly from Abruzzo and the rest of Lazio: it is estimated that in the three municipalities of Frascati, Marino and Albano alone they numbered 3,000 at harvest time.

The "red biennium" began with the occupation of three olive groves belonging to the Ferrajoli in different parts of the territory on March 27, 1919: on April 1 a property belonging to the Doria Landi Pamphili family in Madonnella was invaded, on April 2 a property belonging to the Gelosi family. On April 10, coinciding with the general strike called in Rome, the peasants occupied some properties belonging to the Ferrajoli and Galli families, and the socialist mayor Luigi Sabatini indirectly gave his support to the peasants in their struggle for land redistribution. In 1919 there was also an awakening of Castellan Catholic circles in support of the landowners: the clashes between Populars and Socialists that occurred in Albano during a rally of Popular deputy candidates Francesco Boncompagni Ludovisi and Luigi Capri Cruciani, which ended with a five-year-old child, a fifteen-year-old peasant and an adult carter injured, were emblematic.

In the Italian political and administrative elections of 1921 in Albano, the Socialist Dante Malintoppi won, whose robust junta remained in office until the dissolution imposed by the Fascist dictatorship in 1923. Fascism had difficulty establishing itself in the Roman Castles, and often had to make use of characters "recycled" from the Socialist or Republican party: for this reason it was no less violent, and even in Albano it demonstrated its contradictions. The political and administrative elections of 1924 (the first after the enactment of the Acerbo law) gave a predictable victory to the National Fascist Party in all localities of the Castles (in Genzano di Roma, where Fascism was particularly violent, it had gone from 378 Republican votes in 1921 to 7 in 1924), although they reserved some surprises (in Rocca di Papa, for example, Popular and Social-Communists had together 1,000 votes, more than the Fascists).

===== From World War II to the end of the century =====
World War II hit the Roman Castles hard: on September 9, 1943, German soldiers and Italian soldiers of the "Piacenza" division had a firefight in what is now the public park of Villa Doria. Nineteen dead Italians and the German occupation of Albano were the outcome of this clash, a consequence of the Armistice of Cassibile on September 3, announced by the Badoglio proclamation of September 8, 1943.

After the Anglo-American landing at Anzio (January 22, 1944) the Alban Hills were hard hit by crossfire: the first bombardments hit Albano on January 27, but the most devastating wave hit the city on February 1, with the destruction even of the convent of the Poor Clare nuns in Piazza Pia. On Feb. 10, many displaced people from Albano were hit by the bombing of Propaganda Fide, which occurred within the extra-territorial zone of the Palace of Castel Gandolfo.

The post-World War II period was marked by a rebirth for the city and its territory: the populous hamlets of Cecchina and Pavona were developed, and the city's cultural life intensified with the opening in the 1970s of the Albano Laziale Civic Museum. In the 1960s the city established itself as an important school hub: after the scientific high school run by the Giuseppini Fathers, the state high school Ugo Foscolo and the state professional institute Nicola Garrone opened.

==== The 2000s ====
On Saturday, February 25, 2006, on the sidelines of a procession organized by the radical right-wing movement Tricolour Flame, the center of Albano was the scene of clashes between some militants of Tricolour Flame and other militants of various anti-fascist forces who had rushed from Rome and other localities of the Roman Castles to contest the holding of the procession, which ended with a rally: two people were slightly injured. Similar incidents occurred on the sidelines of Tricolour Flame's national demonstration held in Albano from Sept. 13 to 16, 2007.

== Monuments and places of interest ==
=== Religious architecture ===
==== Cathedral of St. Pancras ====
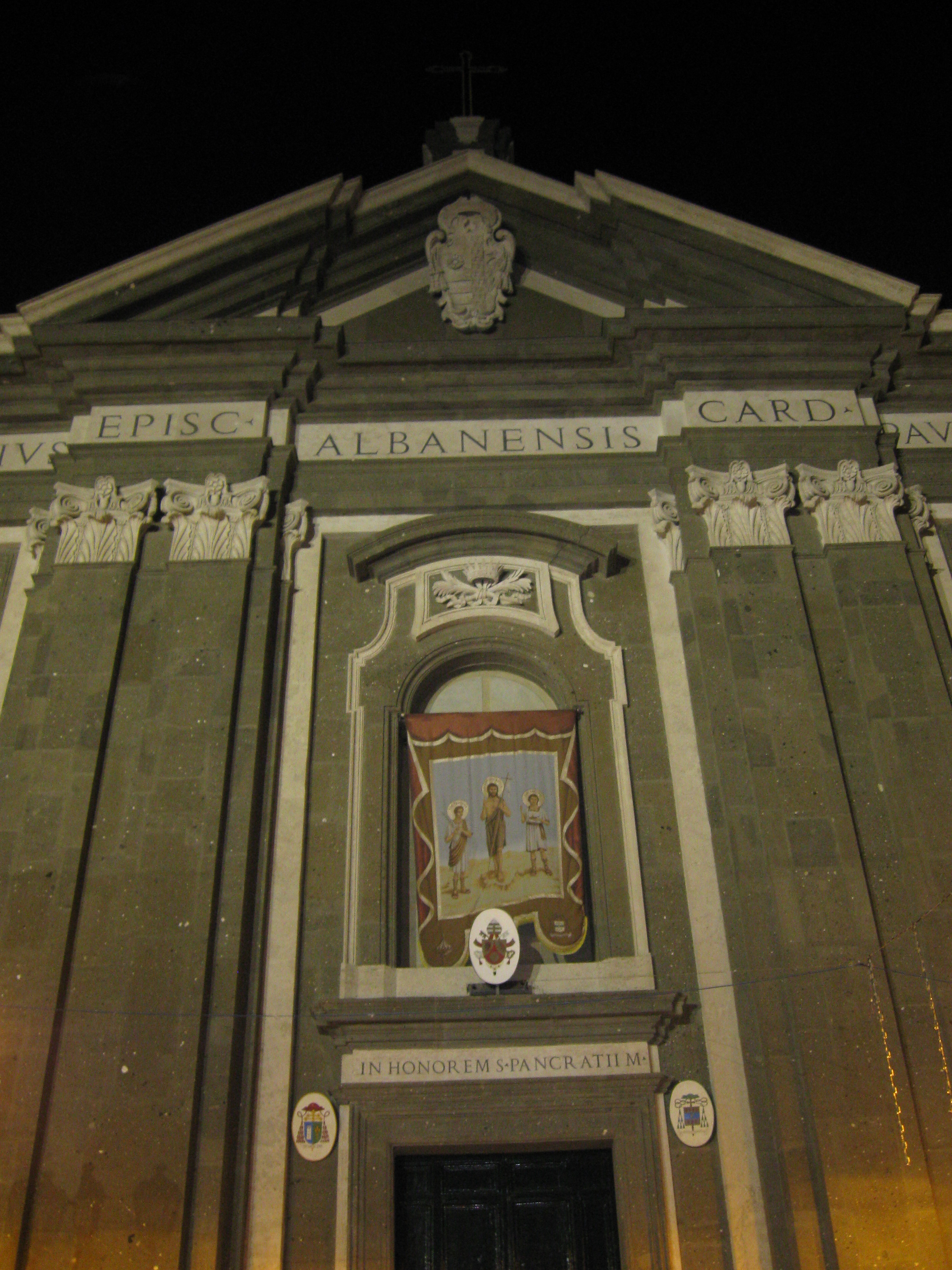
The cathedral basilica of St. Pancras.

The cathedral basilica of St. Pancras is the main place of Catholic worship in the city and the cathedral of the suburbicarian diocese of Albano. The first evidence of the existence of a cathedral in Albano, named after St. John the Baptist, dates back to the pontificate of Pope Sylvester I (314-335).

The building itself was rebuilt by Pope Leo III (795-816) because it was in danger of collapsing due to its age: the conspicuous remnants of ancient columns and masonry brought to light inside the present cathedral date back to this phase.

Other restoration work on the cathedral was due to Cardinal Bishop Michele Bonelli in the late sixteenth century, Cardinal Bishop Flavio Chigi in 1687, and, above all, Cardinal Bishops Ferdinando d'Adda and Fabrizio Paolucci between 1719 and 1722: the latter in particular commissioned architect Carlo Buratti to build the façade.

Further work on the structure was carried out during the period of the Roman Republic (1798–1799), and between 1806 and 1808 work had to be done on the crumbling bell tower: between 1821 and 1826 work was done to reopen to worship the right aisle toward Piazza Pia, which had until then been used as a cemetery.

The restorations that gave the cathedral its current appearance were those of 1854-1858 and 1912-1913.

Restoration work on the interior and exterior of the structure took place in 2007-2008, culminating in the rededication of the high altar by Pope Benedict XVI on Sept. 21, 2008.

The church has a basilica plan with three naves and is neoclassical in style after the 19th-century restorations: six side chapels furnished with paintings from the 17th and 18th centuries open onto the aisles: among other works of art, the 20th-century frescoes of the apse stand out, under which there is a crypt inside which some architectural ornaments of the ancient Leonine basilica are preserved.

==== Church of St. Peter ====
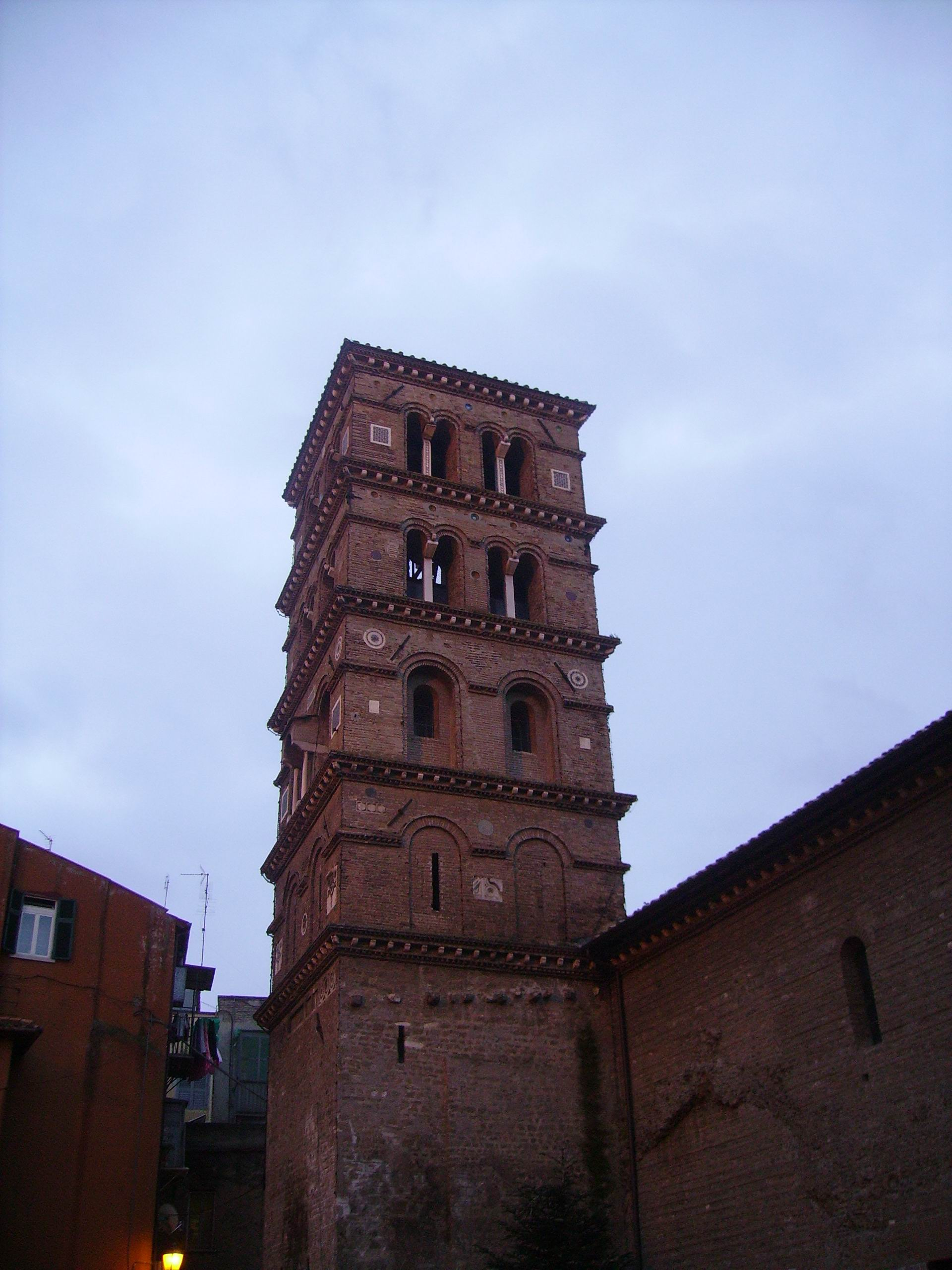
The Romanesque bell tower of the church of St. Peter the Apostle.

The church of St. Peter the Apostle is one of the oldest Catholic places of worship in the city: carved out of a room in the Baths of Caracalla overlooking the Via Appia Antica, it was probably founded in the time of Pope Hormisdas (514-523).

The bell tower, one of the symbols of the city of Albano, was built according to the style of Romanesque architecture around the 12th century, while in the 13th century, the pictorial decoration of the interior of the church was carried out, which has partially survived today.

In 1440 the church, because of its proximity to the Savelli palace, was chosen by the Savelli family as their family chapel: some princely burials were performed there, and until 1697 the Savelli family maintained the juspatronage over the church. Inside, in addition to the aforementioned frescoes and princely tombs, a 16th-century altarpiece and two tapestries dating from 1771 and 1851 are on display. Roman architectural parts are embedded in several parts of the structure, such as the entablature placed on the eastern door and the marble components of the western door, as well as a 3rd-century sarcophagus placed inside the church.

==== Church and Convent of St. PauI ====
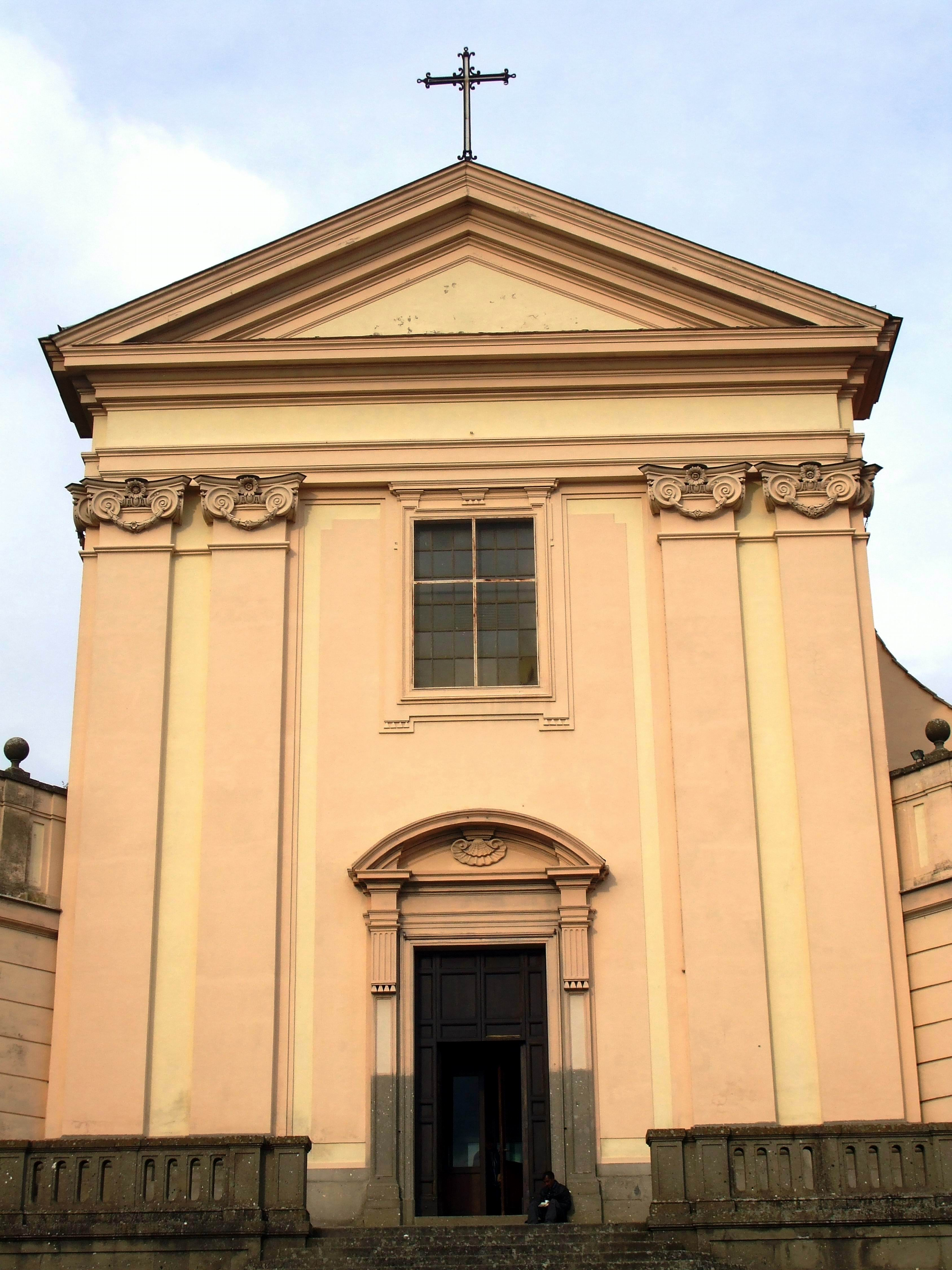
St. Paul's Church.

The church of San Paolo, since 1999 also known as the sanctuary of San Gaspare del Bufalo, has been one of the most important places of worship in Albano, linked to the foundation of the abbey of the same name ruled by Guglielmini fathers and commissioned in 1282 by Cardinal Giacomo Savelli, who became Pope Honorius IV from 1285. The abbey was endowed with substantial land holdings in and around Albano, including the hermitage of Sant'Angelo in Lacu on Lake Albano, and later established in commendam in favor of the Savellis.

The Guglielmini were succeeded in 1444 by the Hieronymite fathers, who remained in the church until the closure of the convents decreed during the Napoleonic occupation (1807–1814).

In the mid-seventeenth century the commendatory abbot Cardinal Paolo Savelli promoted the creation of the "trident of streets" of Albano, which paved the way for the urbanization of the so-called San Paolo suburb.

In 1769 Cardinal Marcantonio Colonna had some restoration work done to the decaying church, while in 1821 the Hieronymites were succeeded in the management of the church and convent by the Missionaries of the Precious Blood, who after the death of their founder St. Gaspar del Bufalo moved part of his body to a side altar, a fact that still attracts numerous pilgrims from all over the world to Albano.

The adjacent convent was completely destroyed during World War II, and was rebuilt in 1952: it currently also houses the bishop's seminary and a vocational training center.

In the one-nave interior, in addition to the relics of St. Gaspar, one can admire the 18th-century fresco on the vault and other 18th-century paintings, including an anonymous copy of Pietro da Cortona's "Baptism of St. Paul" preserved at the church of Santa Maria Immacolata on Via Veneto in Rome.

==== Church and convent of Santa Maria delle Grazie ====
The church of Santa Maria delle Grazie is a Catholic place of worship in Albano, already mentioned according to some scholars in 1203 under the name of Santa Maria Minore: in any case, the church was entrusted in 1560 to the Friars Minor Conventual, who formerly had the custody of the nearby cathedral of San Pancrazio, by Cardinal Bishop Giovanni Gerolamo Morone.

The current appearance of the church is strongly influenced by later interventions in neoclassical style. Inside, some paintings from the 17th century can be admired.

==== Church and convent of Santa Maria della Stella ====
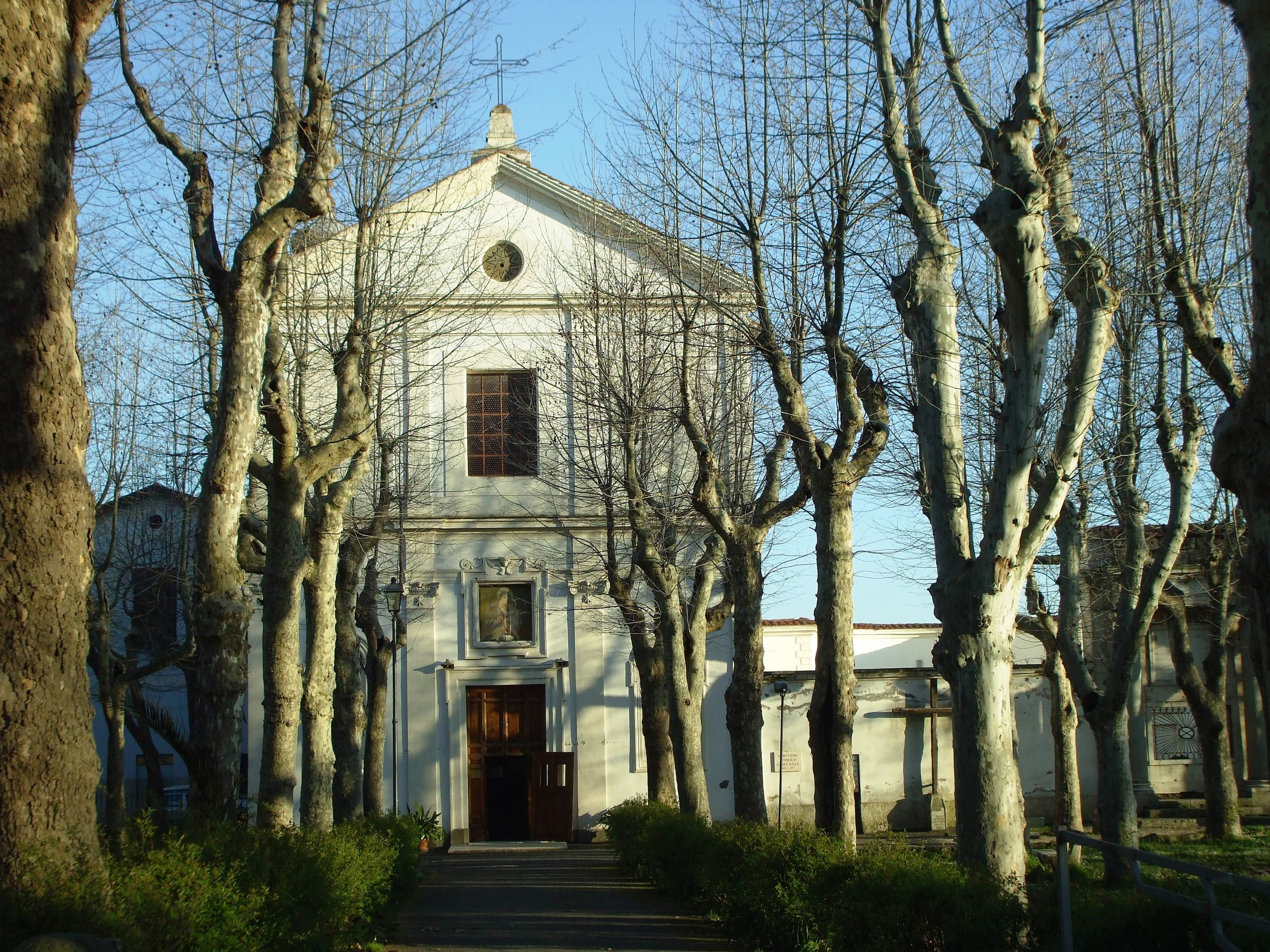
The church of Santa Maria della Stella.

The church of Santa Maria della Stella is one of Albano's most historically rich places of worship, due to the presence underground of the adjacent former convent of the Carmelite fathers of the San Senatore catacombs.

The catacombs were carved out of a disused pozzolan quarry as early as the fourth or fifth century and remained in use until about the ninth century: the church and convent were founded on the site of an ancient hermitage in 1565 at the behest of Fabrizio and Cristoforo Savelli.

The church, which collapsed in 1676, was restored by the last Prince Giulio Savelli and later by Cardinal Niccolò Coscia around the middle of the 18th century.

In 1826 the municipality placed next to the church the municipal cemetery, hitherto located in the right aisle of the cathedral of San Pancrazio: this cemetery, replaced after the annexation of Lazio to the Kingdom of Italy in 1870 with the present municipal cemetery, is also known as the "plague cemetery" because it was the final resting place for the victims of the 1867 cholera epidemic. Other restorations to the church were carried out in 1957 and 1987.

Inside, in late Baroque one-nave style, it is possible to admire the sacred image of the Madonna, which can be dated to the 14th century, and some paintings from the 18th century.

==== Church and convent of St. Bonaventure ====
The church of St. Bonaventure, also called St. Francis of Assisi, is a place of worship in Albano adjacent to the convent of Friars Minor Capuchin. The convent was founded in 1619 at the behest of Princess Flaminia Colonna Gonzaga, and the church was consecrated in 1635 by Cardinal Giulio Savelli.

Inside the one-nave interior in late Baroque style, the altarpiece by the Dutch painter Gerard van Honthorst is especially noteworthy. Next to the convent is a large wooded area largely owned by the municipality, located at the top of the Capuchin Hill (615 m above sea level), from which there is a panoramic view of Lake Albano on one side and the city and coastal plain below on the other.

==== Church and Convent of the Immaculate Conception ====
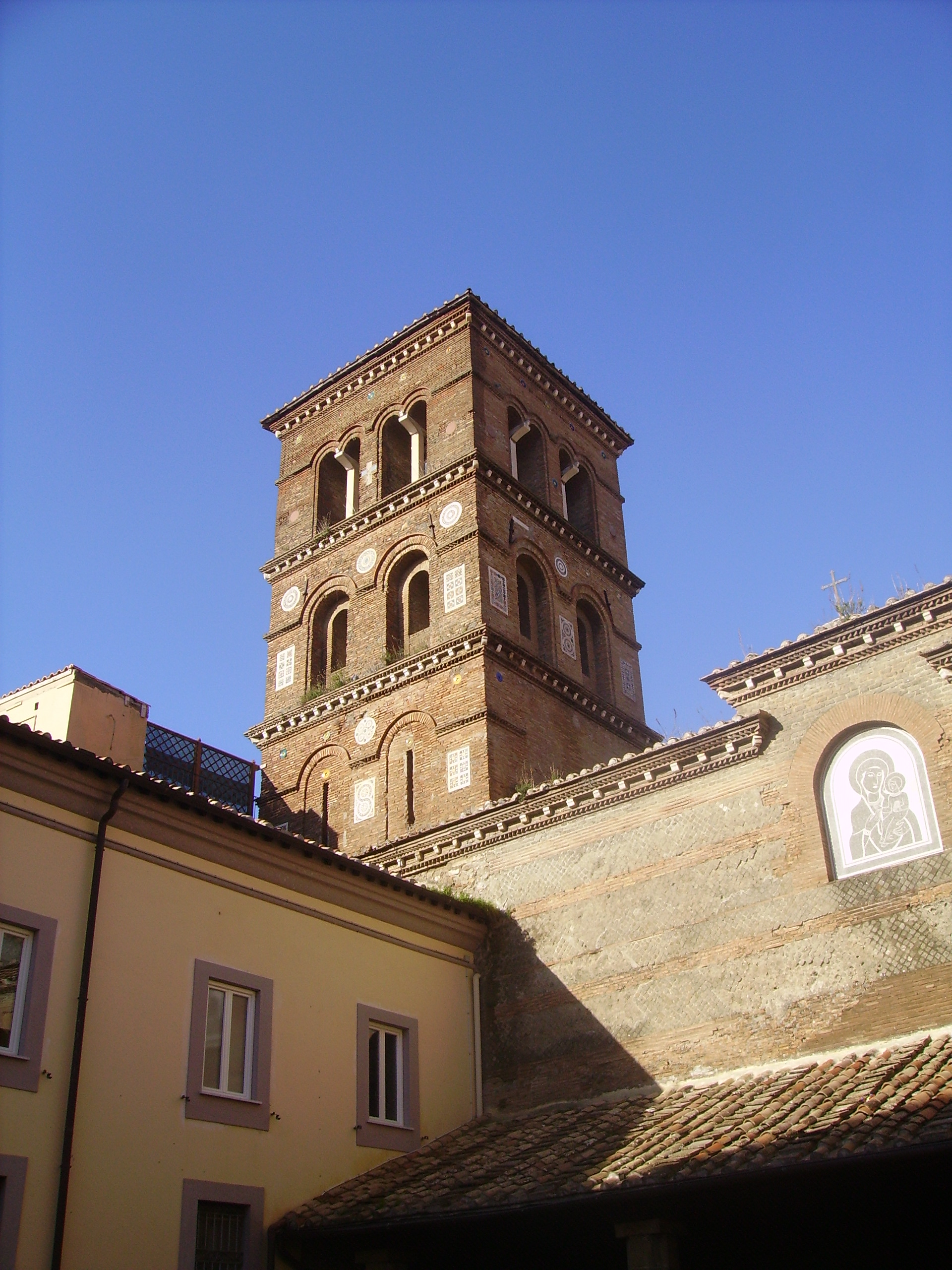
The Romanesque bell tower of the sanctuary of Santa Maria della Rotonda.

The Church of the Immaculate Conception, better known as the Church of the Poor Clares or, popularly, of the "buried alive," is a place of Catholic worship attached to the convent of the Poor Clare nuns of strict observance, founded in 1631 at the behest of Princess Caterina Savelli and already authorized by Pope Urban VIII in a papal bull of August 8, 1625.

The convent, with an elevation on Piazza Pia but included in the perimeter of the Pontifical Villa of Castel Gandolfo, was, in spite of this, razed to the ground by the Anglo-American aerial bombardment of February 1, 1944 and, later, rebuilt. Sixteen nuns died in the bombing.

Today it is included in the perimeter of the extraterritorial zone of the Pontifical Villas of Castel Gandolfo.

==== Sanctuary of Santa Maria della Rotonda ====
The sanctuary of Santa Maria della Rotonda is the oldest place of worship in the city and in the entire suburbicarian diocese of Albano: in fact, it stands inside a Roman nymphaeum built in the Domitian age (81-96) as part of Domitian's villa at Castel Gandolfo. Consecrated to church use probably around the 8th century, the first official consecration dates back to 1060. The Marian shrine was managed at this time by the Basilian monks of the Abbey of St. Mary of Grottaferrata, but by the time of the second consecration in 1316, the management of the place of worship was already in the hands of Augustinian nuns. The shrine was assigned to the Hieronymite fathers of the basilica of Saints Boniface and Alexius on the Aventine in Rome in 1444, and under this ownership it remained until purchased by Cardinal-Bishop Giovanni Battista Pallotta in 1663: the bishop's seminary was installed at the shrine in 1667, assigned from 1708 to 1801 to the Scolopian fathers.

The current appearance of the building is due to the drastic restorations of 1935-1938, which removed all traces not only of seventeenth-century tampering but also of fourteenth-century and early medieval interventions: in the interior, which has a central plan with a dome pierced in the center in imitation of the Pantheon in Rome, albeit on a smaller scale, in addition to the Marian image datable to around the 8th century, some pictorial cycles from the 14th century and, in the portico, the original mosaic floor from the Domitian age are preserved.

=== Civil architecture ===
==== Savelli Palace ====
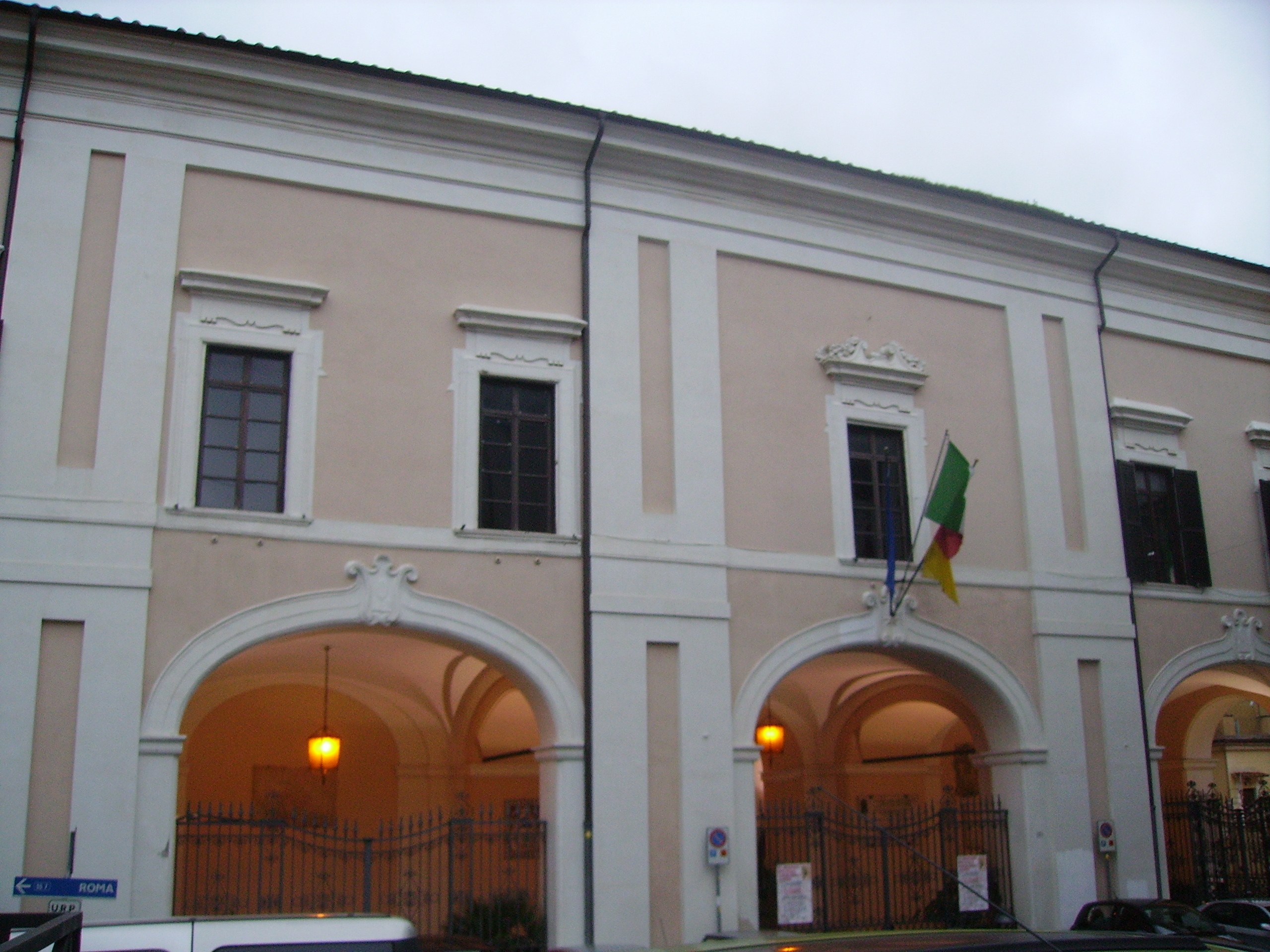
Savelli Palace.

Palazzo Savelli is the most important historical palace in the city, currently used as a municipal residence together with the adjacent Palazzo Camerario. In Roman times there were some thermal baths in the area of the palace, according to what can be deduced from several aquarian fistulas of the Domitian age found on the site: around the 13th century it was structured by Luca Savelli or his son Giacomo as a fortification along the Via Appia Antica. The ancient military function is recalled, in addition to the two quadrangular towers overlooking St. Peter's Square, by the wall technique in peperino blocks with thick mortar bed.

Finally, between the sixteenth and seventeenth centuries, the castle underwent its transformation into the noble residence of the Savelli family: after the acquisition of the fief by the Apostolic Camera in 1697, the adjacent Palazzo Camerale overlooking Corso Alcide de Gasperi, connected to the main body by an overpass, was added to the palace, and the building was repurposed as the residence of distinguished guests. It became the municipal seat of Albano in 1870, and the interiors were refurbished in the 1930s by painter Aldo Albani.

Inside the palace are the premises of the former magistrate's court on the ground floor, used as a venue for temporary exhibitions and conferences, the grand staircase leading to the main floor, where there is the frescoed hall of honor now used as the seat of the city council. In the portico on the ground floor are preserved some decorations from the demolished Porta Romana, along with other modern tombstones and inscriptions.

==== Rospigliosi Palace ====
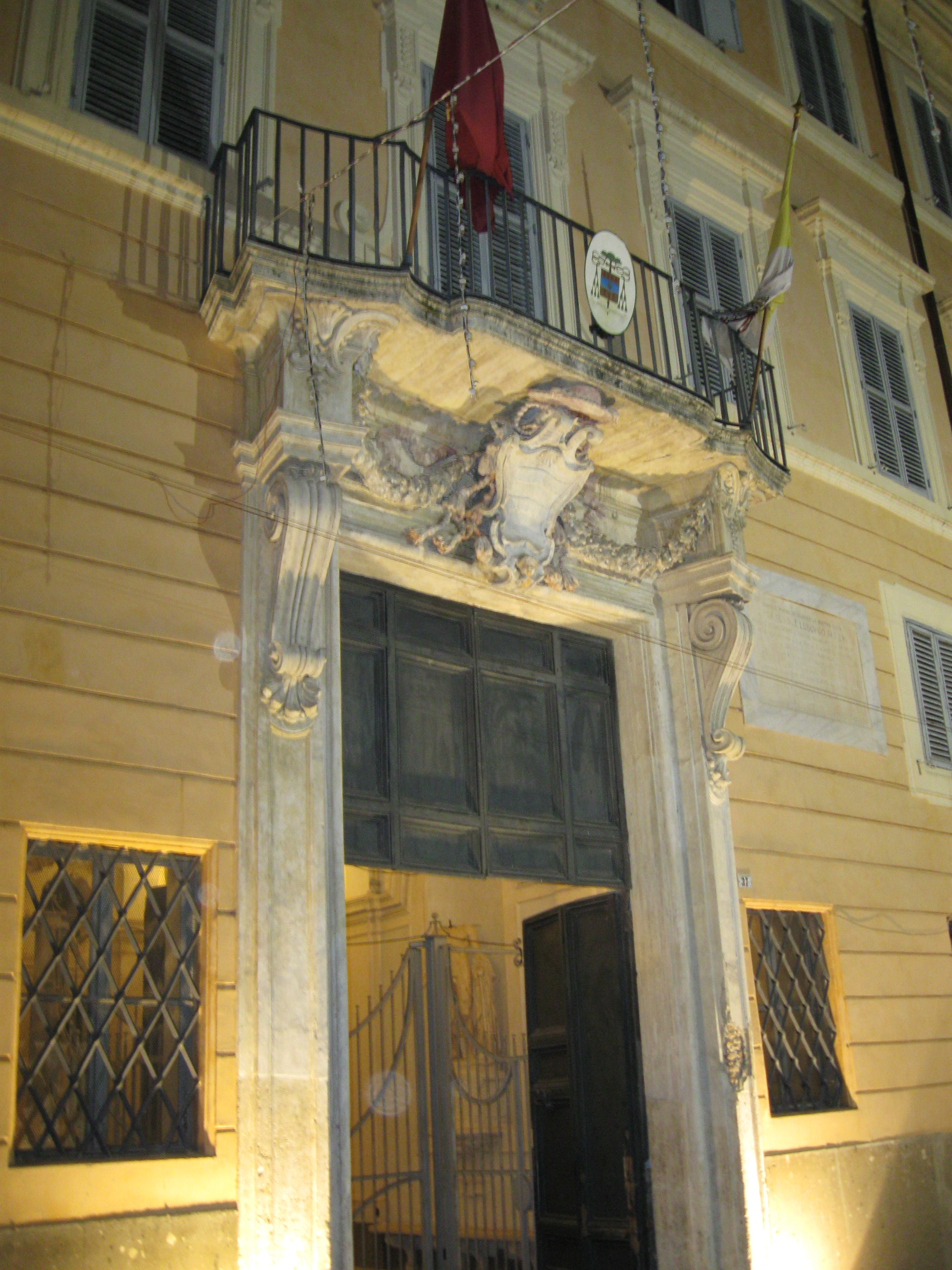
The portal of the bishop's palace.

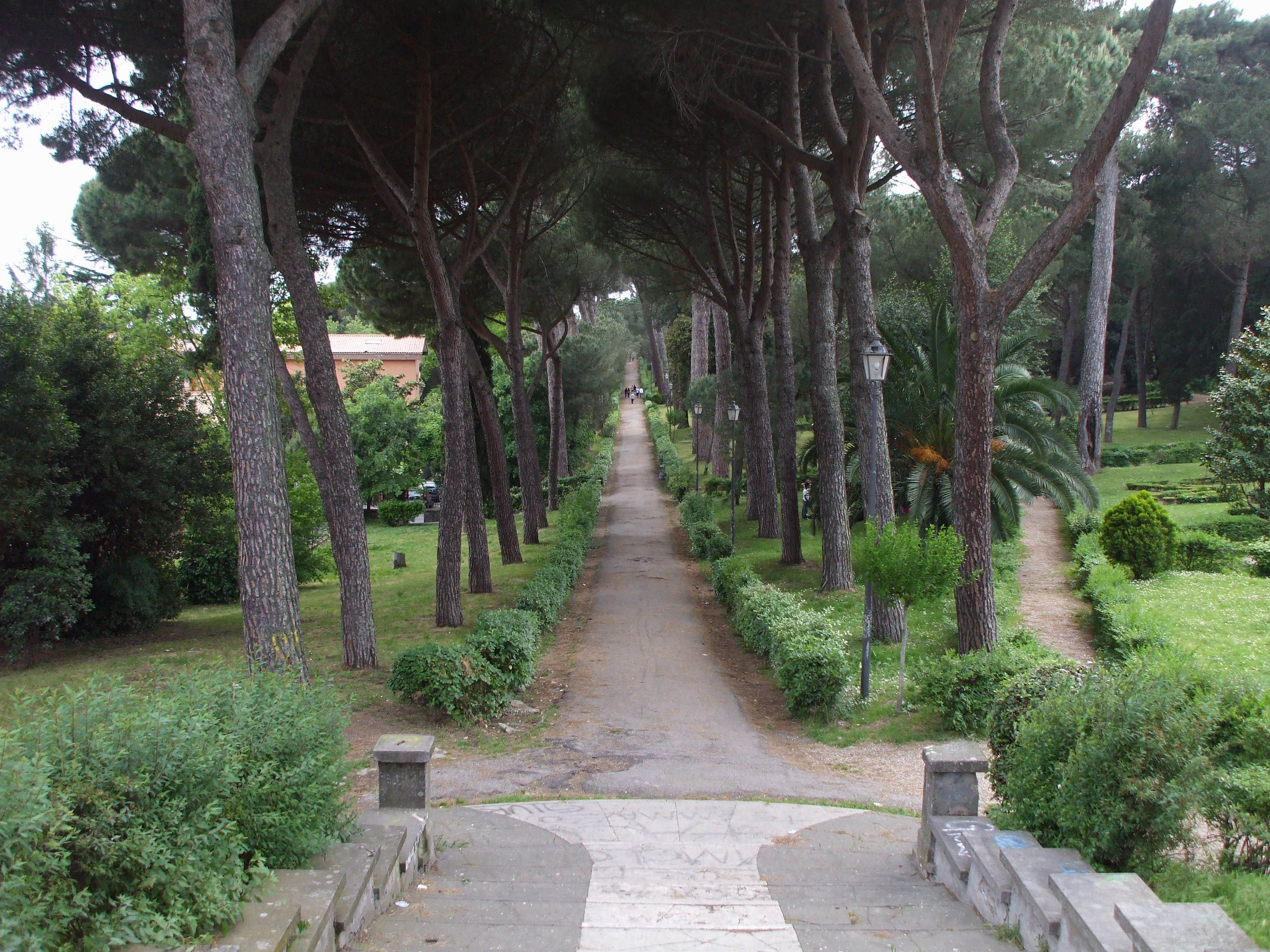
The lower avenue of the Villa Doria public park.

Palazzo Rospigliosi is a historic palace built by the Rospigliosi family in 1667 in the building of Borgo San Paolo, on today's Via San Leonardo Murialdo. Since the 1930s, the Giuseppini del Murialdo fathers have been installed in the building, who founded a scientific high school and today maintain there, in addition to the scientific one, an elementary school, a secondary school, and a classical high school.

==== Pamphilj Palace ====
Palazzo Pamphilj, also called the Nazarene College, is one of Albano's largest and most architecturally significant historical palaces: the genesis of its construction was examined in a 1988 study by the Accademia degli Incolti as exemplifying an eighteenth-century patrician building in the Ager Romanus.

The palace was built between 1708 and 1717 at the behest of Cardinal Benedetto Pamphilj on the site of two pre-existing holiday cottages, the Maculani and Bottini casinos. After ups and downs in 1764 the palace was sold to the Scolopian fathers of the Nazarene College in Rome, who adapted it as a summer resort for their pupils: the work that fundamentally gave the palace its present appearance was carried out in 1777.

The Scolopi continued to use the palace until 1944 when the City of Albano signed an agreement with the religious to install 52 families of homeless evacuees from World War II in the palace: the palace was thus "violated," according to scholars Marco Silvestri and Enzo d'Ambrosio, to make apartments inside it. Currently, the building, abandoned by the evacuees, is in total disrepair.

==== Bishop's Palace ====
The Bishop's Palace, also called the Lercari Palace, was founded by Cardinal Nicolò Maria Lercari in the first half of the 18th century: the palace hosted Pope Benedict XIII during his trip for the apostolic visit to Benevento in 1727.

It was donated to the diocesan chancery as an episcopal residence upon the cardinal's death in 1757, since until then the city lacked a residence for its cardinal-bishop, who was exempt from the residency requirement imposed on all other bishops by the Council of Trent. Cardinal bishop Francesco Scipione Maria Borghese undertook extensive work on the building, which housed the cardinal bishops for six months of the year: today the diocesan offices and the bishop are permanently based there.

==== Corsini Palace ====
Palazzo Corsini is a historic palace in Albano built along the Via Appia in the present-day Borgo Garibaldi around the first half of the eighteenth century by the Corsini family together with its large Italian garden: in 1817 the palace was renovated by Charles IV of Spain, the ousted Spanish monarch, while in 1844 it was restored and nicknamed "royal inn" by architect Pietro Antonio Giorni. Today it houses the general management of the Local Health Authority RMH.

==== Villa Doria ====
The Villa Doria public park, better known simply as Villa Doria is the largest green area in downtown Albano. The palace and villa were built in the early eighteenth century by Cardinal Bishop Fabrizio Paolucci together with the chapel of San Giobbe, furnished with a painting by Carlo Maratta, and later became the property of the Doria family. The palace was completely destroyed during World War II, while the villa was the scene of the Battle of Villa Doria between Italians and Germans on September 9, 1943, which ended with the death of twenty-six Italian soldiers. The rubble of the palace was cleared in 1951 to make way for the current Giuseppe Mazzini Square. The villa is a public park, and within the green perimeter are the remains of a Roman villa attributed to Gnaeus Pompeius Magnus.

==== Villa Altieri ====
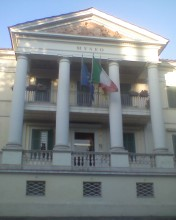
Villa Ferrajoli.

Villa Altieri is a villa built on the Appian Way at the entrance to Albano in the early eighteenth century by Cardinal Lorenzo Altieri on the site of a farmhouse owned by the Savelli family: work was completed by 1720.

Today the palace with its majestic portal on the Appian Way, formerly owned by the Oblates of St. Francis de Sales, houses a restaurant. The villa, on the other hand, is a public park adjacent to the "Giovanni Pascoli" state middle school.

==== Villa Ferrajoli ====
The public park of Villa Ferrajoli, better known simply as Villa Ferrajoli, is a villa built in the early nineteenth century by Domenico Benucci in front of Palazzo Corsini. The villa and the mansion were purchased in 1845 by Marquis Giuseppe Ferrajoli, who enlarged and arranged the complex in neoclassical style. The mansion was purchased by the City of Albano in 1948: the villa was stripped of many parts on which the modern Villa Ferrajoli neighborhood was built. In 1970 the state professional institute "Nicola Garrone" was placed in the building, and in 1974 it became a suitable home for the Albano civic museum, on the initiative of its director Pino Chiarucci.

==== Villa Venosa-Boncompagni ====
Villa Venosa-Boncompagni was built in 1857 by the Boncompagni family in what is now Borgo Garibaldi on the Appian Way: the garden was renowned, filled with native and tropical plants kept inside twelve large greenhouses. Today the palace and villa are decayed and used for civilian housing.

=== Military architecture ===
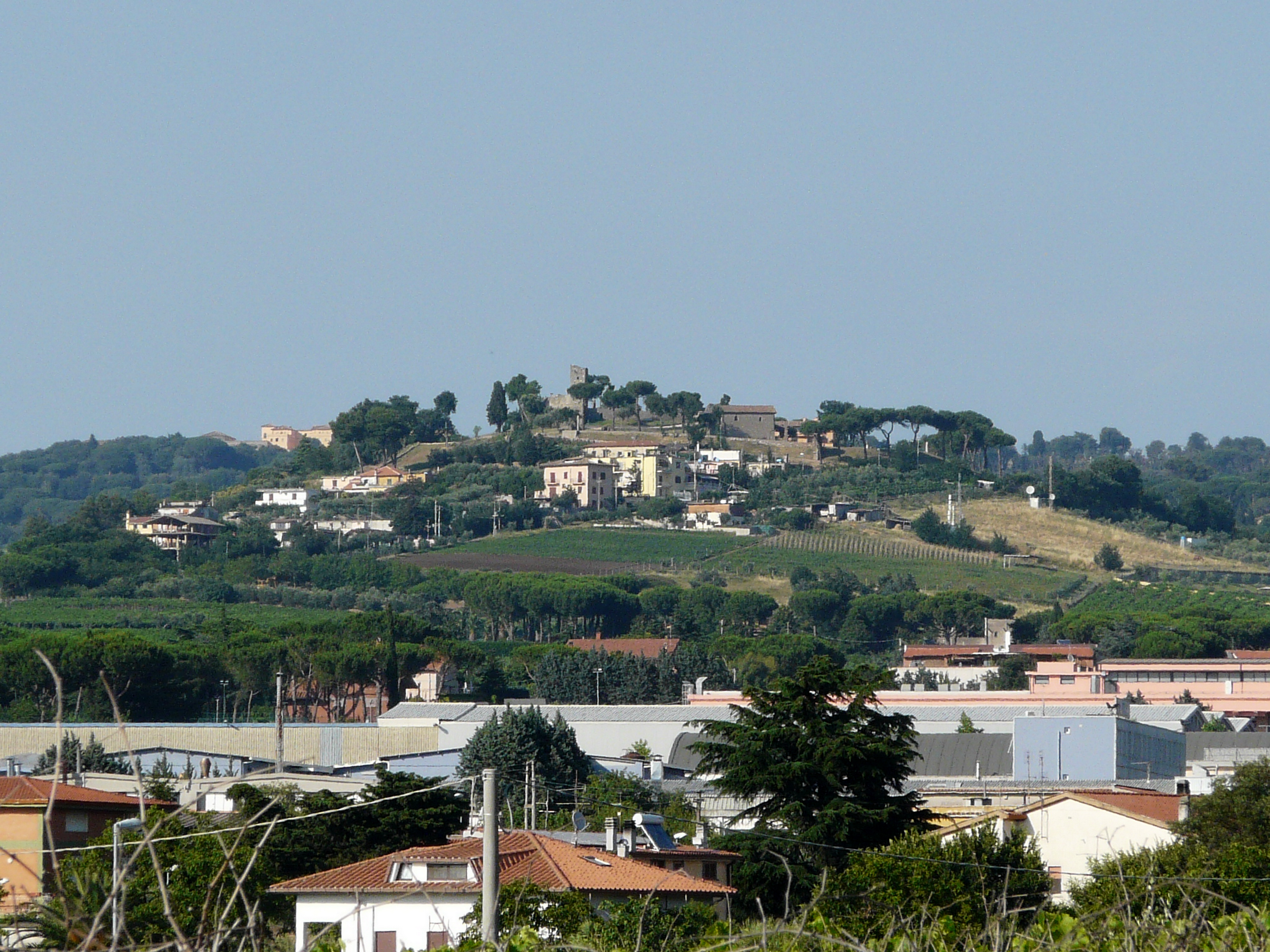
Savello Castle.

In the Middle Ages Albano was surrounded by walls, as in the 11th century it was a stronghold of Pope Paschal II on two occasions, in 1108 and again in 1116, and in the 13th century the Savelli family took care of fortifying the city by building the present Savelli palace and probably transforming the Roman amphitheater into a fortress called "palatium," mentioned in 1203 and 1217.

All the fortifications were dismantled in 1436 when the city was razed to the ground by Cardinal Giovanni Maria Vitelleschi: to this day, therefore, it is impossible to follow the layout of the medieval walls.

However, it is possible instead to identify at least three gates: the Porta San Paolo, which opens in Piazza San Paolo near the church of the same name, the only one still standing, and two gates demolished in recent times, the Porta dei Cappuccini, a medieval entrance that opened halfway along the present Via San Francesco d'Assisi, demolished in the last thirty years of the 19th century to widen the street, and the Porta Romana, the most valuable from an artistic point of view, rebuilt under the pontificate of Pope Clement XI in 1713: demolished in 1906 to allow the Tranvie dei Castelli Romani tramway line to pass through, despite the protests of Professor Giuseppe Del Pinto, who succeeded in having the monumental components of the gate saved, now placed in the atrium of Palazzo Savelli.

=== Archaeological remains ===
==== Villas of the Republican age ====
Among the villas that arose in the Albano area in the Republican age, the most important and the best preserved is that of Gnaeus Pompeius Magnus, located conventionally (and according to some archaeologists wrongly) on the site of the present public park of Villa Doria: not far from it on the Appian Way at the entrance to the city is a Roman tomb popularly known as Pompey's tomb, an attribution considered probable by archaeologists. Among other remarkable villas or estates to be mentioned are those owned by Quintus Aurelius (of unknown location, according to some historians placed near the mouth of the modern Albano bypass road on the Appian Way coming from Rome), by Lucius Albusius Iustus (of unknown location), of Marcus Junius Brutus (of unknown location), of Publius Clodius Pulcher (most likely located on the Appian Way near the locality of Herculaneum in the municipality of Castel Gandolfo), in addition to the anonymous villas found near the southern shore of Lake Albano and the Albano Laziale railway station.

==== Villas of the imperial age ====
In the imperial age new villas sprang up in the Albano area, such as that of Lucius Anneus Seneca located on the southern shore of Lake Albano, and that of Publius Papinius Statius, located in an unidentified place. In addition, the republican villa of Gnaeus Pompeius Magnus was converted after Augustus (27 BC-17) into an imperial estate, and remained so until the Flavian age: in Hadrian's time, it was estranged from the imperial estate. However, it returned to the imperial possessions in the fourth century.

However, the largest residential complex that occupied the territory of the center of Albano in the imperial age was Domitian's villa at Castel Gandolfo: covering a total area of 13 or 14 square kilometers, traversed by a dense network of roads and served by at least three aqueducts, the "manorial" part of the estate stretched over three hills, between Castel Gandolfo and Albano Laziale, roughly occupying the site of the present Villa Barberini, in the extra-territorial area of the Pontifical Villa of Castel Gandolfo. Divided into three terraces, this part housed the cisterns, thermal baths, some nymphaeums and a terrace on Lake Albano, and the theater on the first shelf above, the cryptoporticus, hippodrome and palace on the second shelf, scattered constructions on the third, towards the Via Appia Antica.

==== The "Castra Albana" ====
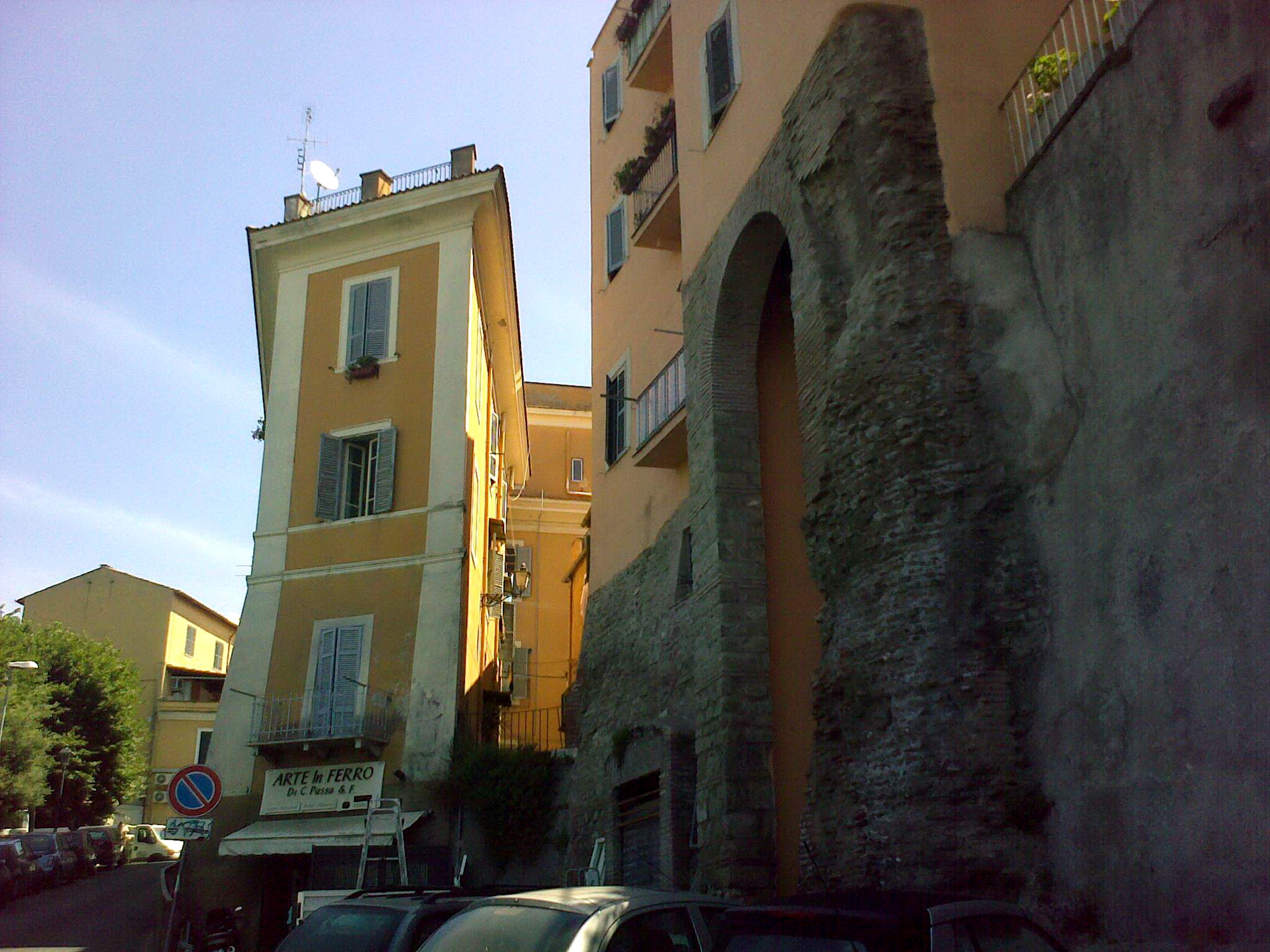
Via don Carlo Gnocchi: modern constructions founded on the Baths of Caracalla.

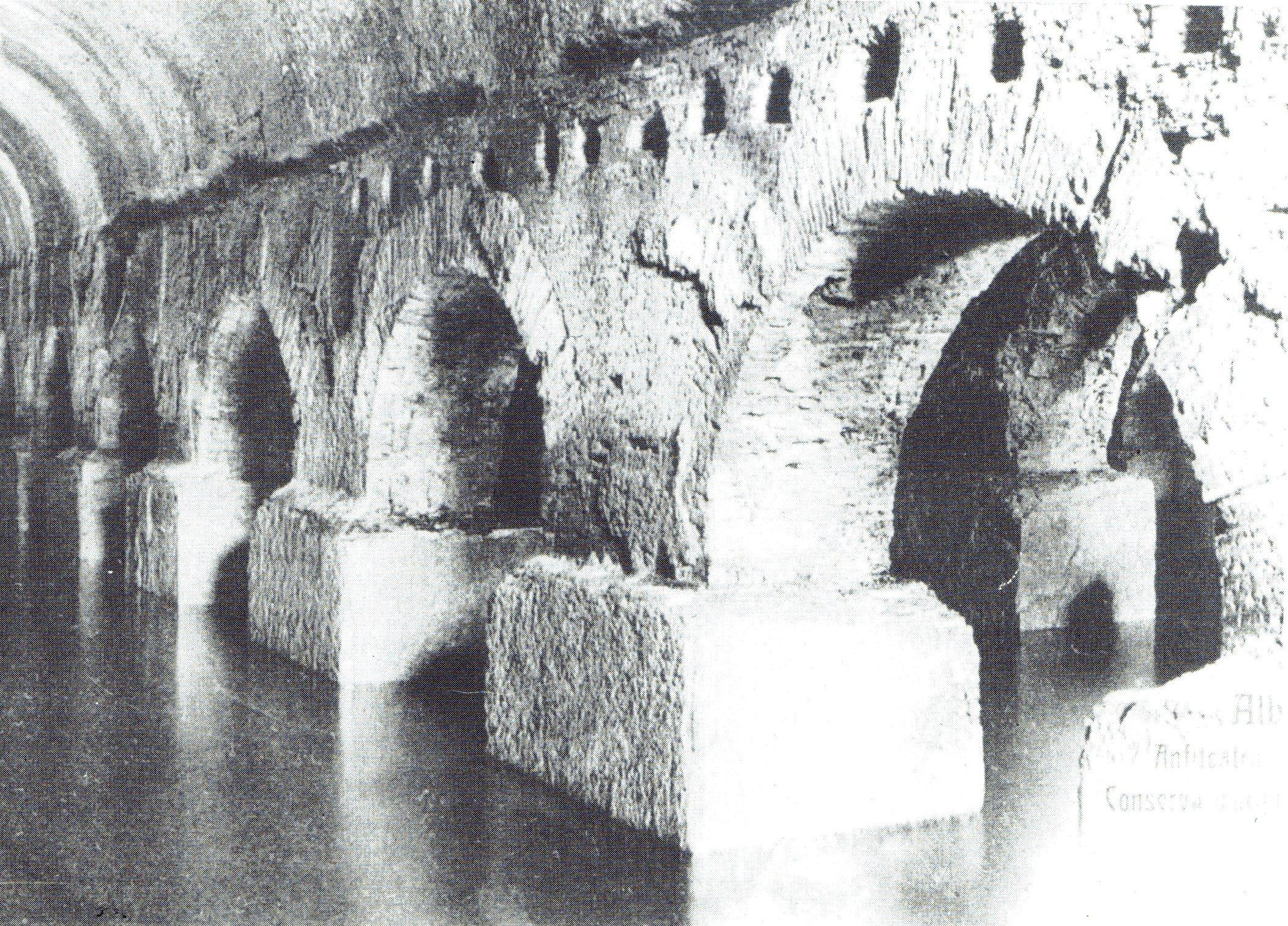
"The Cisternoni" in a photo postcard before their abandonment in 1912.

The "castra"

The Castra Albana were the stable fortified encampment of the Legio II Parthica in Italy, founded by Emperor Septimius Severus (193-211) as soon as he came to power, for his political security. The legion continued to prosper until the second half of the third century, but by the beginning of the fourth century the castra were already abandoned: on the site of these the present city of Albano sprang up in the early Middle Ages.

The perimeter of the castra walls is 1334 meters: the most abundant remains are found on the southeastern side in Castro Partico Street, where a 142-meter-long section of wall remains. Notable remains of the circle can be found in the same Via Castro Partico, where there is a rectangular watchtower and the Porta principalis sinixtra, in Via Alcide De Gasperi in front of Palazzo Savelli, where there is the imposing Porta praetoria, and in the underground of Via San Pancrazio, where a circular watchtower remains.

Very little remains of the buildings inside the castra: of the praetorium nothing is known except the probable site, of the soldiers' quarters only sporadic walls have been found in different parts of the city, while more evidence is available regarding the "thermae parvae," a small bath facility located near the present-day Piazza della Rotonda, and especially of "i Cisternoni," a large Roman cistern whose long sides measure 45.50 and 47.90 meters, while the short sides are 29.62 and 31.90: the surface area is 1436.50 square meters, with a capacity of 10,132 cubic meters of water.

The Baths of Caracalla

A few imposing elements remain of the Baths of Caracalla or "of Cellomaio," visible as a whole from Via Volontari del Sangue: this large thermal facility outside the walls of the encampment was built by Emperor Caracalla (211-217) shortly after the castra were completed. The structure of the building consists of a cement core of peperino flakes, interrupted in places by bricks: the only entire room is a 37 by 12-meter hall occupied since the early Middle Ages by the church of St. Peter.

The Roman amphitheater

The Roman amphitheater was built after the baths, around the middle of the 3rd century, outside the walls of the castra, again in function of the presence of Parthian legionaries. Currently, the entire southern hemisphere of the amphitheater is visible, while the northern part is buried by the construction walls of Via San Francesco d'Assisi and Via dell'Anfiteatro Romano. Other remnants, partly hewn out of the peperino living rock and partly built of opus quadratum of the same stone, include the pulvinar, or imperial stage, the very peculiar and "bizarre" structural fornices, the equally peculiar vomitoria, or access corridors to the arena.

The burial ground of the Selvotta

The burial ground of the Legio II Parthica was identified at the Selvotta locality, on the municipal borders between Albano Laziale and Ariccia, beginning in 1866: by the 1960s about fifty tombs had been discovered, most of them with funerary epigraphs. All the tombs had the same type of construction, with the boxes dug into the peperino live rock and the lids made of a monolithic block of the same stone, usually in the form of a roof or a lid. The wives and children of Parthian legionaries were also buried in the burial ground.

==== Isolated sepulchres ====
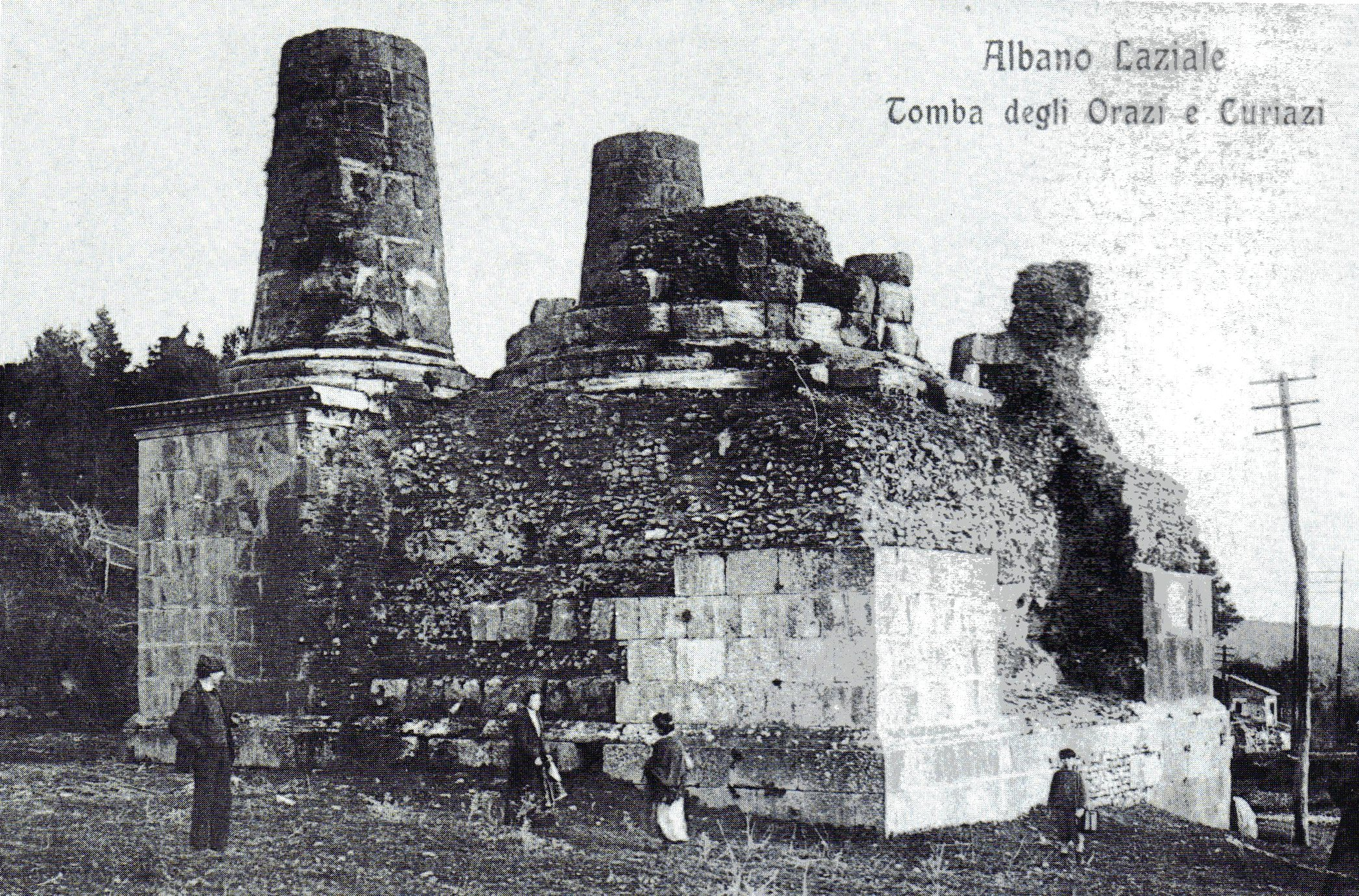
The sepulchre "of the Horatii and Curiatii" in an early twentieth-century photo postcard.

Sepulchre "of the Horatii and the Curiatii"

The truncated-cone tomb located along the Via Appia Antica in the La Stella district, in front of the church of the same name, is one of Albano's most characteristic monuments: popularly identified with the tomb of the Horatii and Curiatii (a tradition rejected by archaeologists), it has also been attributed to the gens Azzia of Aricia (whose last houses probably lapped, in ancient times, the tomb), to Gnaeus Pompey the Great, to Aruns, the son of the Lucumo of Chiusi Porsenna, who fell at the Battle of Aricia in 505 BC. C. The monument has a series of chimney-like peperino truncated cones rising on an ornate podium to the base of the plinth: the burial cell is in the center, topped by the larger truncated cone. The sepulcher was restored between 1825 and 1837 by Giuseppe Valadier, commissioned by the papal inspector general Antonio Canova: its dimensions are 5 meters by 4.80 at the base. The sepulcher has Etruscan influences because it is reminiscent of the tomb of Lars Porsena at Chiusi.

"Tower-shaped" sepulcher or "of Pompey the Great"

This tower-shaped sepulchre, located on the Via Appia Antica before the entrance to Albano coming from Rome, has traditionally been attributed to Gnaeus Pompeius Magnus: it has a square plan of 10.50 meters per side, and was articulated on several floors until it reached 45 meters, a singular height for a tomb. Its dating is around the first century. Moreover, the shape of the tomb, ending in a cusp, is very rare in central Italy.

Underground sepulcher

This sepulchre, located under Corso Giacomo Matteotti a few meters below the present floor level, has been identified by Pino Chiarucci as the real sepulchre of Gnaeus Pompeius Magnus, given its dating to the middle of the first century BC: excavated in the peperino live rock, it consists of a corridor 17.15 meters long and 3 meters high. 35 that leads into two rooms, one above the other, measuring 5.90 meters by 3.84 meters (the upper one) and 3.54 meters by 1.77 meters (the lower one), respectively. One curiosity is an opening in the vault of the upper cell, explained by Giovanni Antonio Ricci as the hole through which prayers were said over the deceased.

Other scattered sepulchres

Other minor sepulchres identified in the Albano territory include a quadrangular temple-like sepulchre in Piazza Risorgimento, 10 meters wide on each side and about 5 meters high, the sepulchre of Aurelius Vitalius and Aurelia Martano located at the 14th mile of the Via Appia Antica, with a characteristic vaguely Egyptian shape, 5 meters wide by 5.50 and still partly buried, and a burial ground of difficult dating located near the Albano railway station, consisting of a cluster of pits and loculi measuring 1.80 meters by 0.45, and traced back by Giuseppe Lugli to the time of the Castra Albana. A republican-era tomb was located next to the one known as "of the Horatii and Curiatii," but it was incorporated into the foundations of the Via Appia Nuova during the construction of the embankment connecting it to the Ariccia bridge around 1851.

==== Early Christian archaeological remains ====
The most important early Christian archaeological remains in the area of Albano are the catacombs of San Senatore, carved out of a disused pozzolan quarry as early as the 4th or 5th century, and remained in use until about the 9th century. Inside the catacombs are some 5th-century frescoes, a Byzantine fresco datable to the 9th century, several pagan and Christian burial inscriptions, and an arcosolium from the late 5th century: two tunnels are still partially excavated.

Other ancient evidences of the Christian presence in the very first centuries of the Christian era in Albano are a Christian oratory located within the remains of the villa attributed to Gnaeus Pompeius Magnus in the present public park of Villa Doria and a Christian oratory discovered within the vomitoria of the Roman amphitheater of Albano Laziale in Via San Francesco d'Assisi.

=== Natural areas ===
The historic center of Albano and its western foothills are completely included in the perimeter of the Castelli Romani Regional Park, although they represent a small part of the municipal territory.

The largest and most important area of urban greenery in the center of Albano is the public park of Villa Doria, followed by the public park of Villa Ada, within which the state professional institute Nicola Garrone is located, the public park of Villa Ferrajoli (called "'a Villetta" by the people of Albano), characterized by some of the first magnolias imported in Italy, and the public green area of the Parco della Rimembranza, where the war memorial is located. The municipal forest of the Capuchin Hill, located at the convent of the Friars Minor Capuchin adjacent to the church of St. Bonaventure, is one of the most valuable green areas of the Roman Castles, since the primitive flora of the Alban Hills survives there, formed by the so-called "Q.T.A. forest" (i.e., oaks, limes and maples), and survived the massive introduction by man of the chestnut tree between the seventeenth and eighteenth centuries, a plant that covers about 80 percent of the wooded area of the Castelli Romani Regional Park.

== See also ==
- Roman Castles
- Cecchina
- Pavona
- Rocca di Papa

== Bibliography ==
- Ricci, Giovanni Antonio (1787). Memorie storiche dell'antichissima città di Alba Longa e dell'Albano moderno. Roma: Giovanni Zempel.
- Nibby, Antonio (1848). Analisi storico-topografico-antiquaria della carta de' dintorni di Roma. Vol. I. Roma: Tipografia delle Belle Arti.
- Lugli, Giuseppe (1969). Studi e ricerche su Albano archeologica 1914-1967 (II ed.). Albano Laziale: Comune di Albano Laziale.
- VV., AA.; Alberto, Terenzio; Giovanni, Battista; Trovalusci, Giuseppe Lugli; Guglielmo, Mathiae; Alberto, Galletti; Giovanni, Bellagamba (1972). Il tempio di Santa Maria della Rotonda (II ed.). Albano Laziale: Graphikcenter.
- Coarelli, Filippo (1981). Guide archeologhe Laterza - Dintorni di Roma (I ed.). Roma-Bari: Casa editrice Giuseppe Laterza & figli.
- Chiarucci, Pino (1988). Albano Laziale (II ed.). Albano Laziale: Museo Civico di Albano Laziale.
- Mancini, Ugo (2002). Lotte contadine e avvento del fascismo ai Castelli Romani (I ed.). Roma: Armando Editore. ISBN 88-8358-337-X.
- Del Pinto, Giuseppe (1918). Albano nel 1798. Roma.
- Del Nero, Raimondo (2002). La diocesi tuscolana dalla origini al XIII secolo. Frascati: Associazioni "Amici del Tuscolo".
- Gregorovius, Ferdinand (1973). Storia della città di Roma nel Medioevo. Torino: Einaudi. ISBN 88-06-37689-6.
- Lucidi, Emanuele (1796). Memorie storiche dell'antichissimo municipio ora terra dell'Ariccia, e delle sue colonie di Genzano e Nemi.
- Silvestri, Marco; D'Ambrosio, Enzo (1988). Palazzo Pamphilj in Albano Laziale. Roma: Accademia degli Incolti.
- Tomassetti, Giuseppe (1979). La Campagna Romana antica, medioevale e moderna IV. Torino: Olschki. ISBN 9788822228819.
- Moroni, Gaetano (1840). Dizionario di erudizione storico-ecclesiastica. Venezia: Tipografia Emiliani.
- Petrillo, Saverio (1995). I papi a Castel Gandolfo. Velletri: Edizioni Tra 8 & 9.
