= Sanctuary of Santa Maria della Rotonda =

Sanctuary in Albano Laziale, Italy

- Santuario di Maria Santissima della Rotonda di Albano Laziale
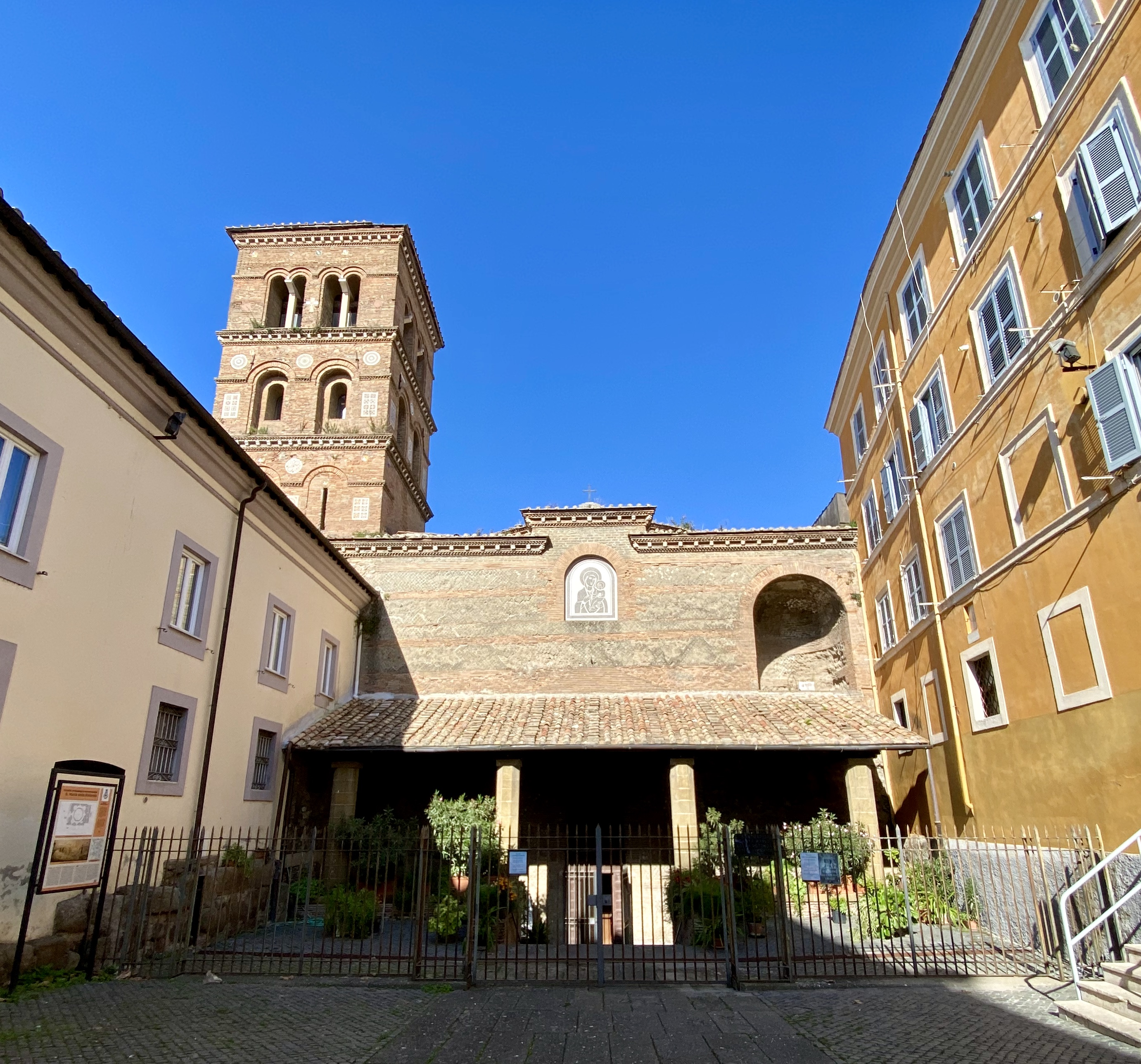
- The façade of the sanctuary (November 2020).

- Location within Italy
- 41.73012°N 12.65934°E
- Location: Albano Laziale, Lazio, Italy
- Denomination: Catholic

History
- Dedication: Mary
- Consecrated: December 7, 1060; September 8, 1316; August 5, 1938

Architecture
- Style: Paleochristian; Romanesque
- Groundbreaking: II century
- Completed: II century

Administration
- Diocese: Roman Catholic Suburbicarian Diocese of Albano

The Sanctuary of Maria Santissima della Rotonda ('a Ritonna in Albano dialect), formerly known as Santa Maria Maggiore, is an important Marian sanctuary in Lazio, located in the city of Albano Laziale, in the province of Rome, in the Roman Castles area.

The sanctuary occupies an ancient round building of Roman construction dating back to the 1st century, traceable to Domitian's villa at Castel Gandolfo, which was formerly a nymphaeum or, according to other hypotheses, a temple. The building was converted to Christian use at the time of Constantine the Great or in the period between the 9th and 11th centuries.

Probably run in the first centuries of its existence by religious of the Byzantine rite, it was managed by Augustinian nuns from the 14th century until 1444 and was later assigned to the Girolaminian religious of the basilica of Saints Boniface and Alexius on the Aventine Hill in Rome, who held it until 1663, when the sanctuary was purchased by the suburbicarian diocese of Albano for the purpose of installing the bishop's seminary there. Between 1708 and 1799, the direction of the seminary and the sanctuary passed to the Piarist Fathers. Since then, the sanctuary has been diocesan property and is attached to the parish of the cathedral basilica of San Pancrazio. Today it is listed among the protected architectural monuments of Lazio.

== History ==
=== Pagan use ===
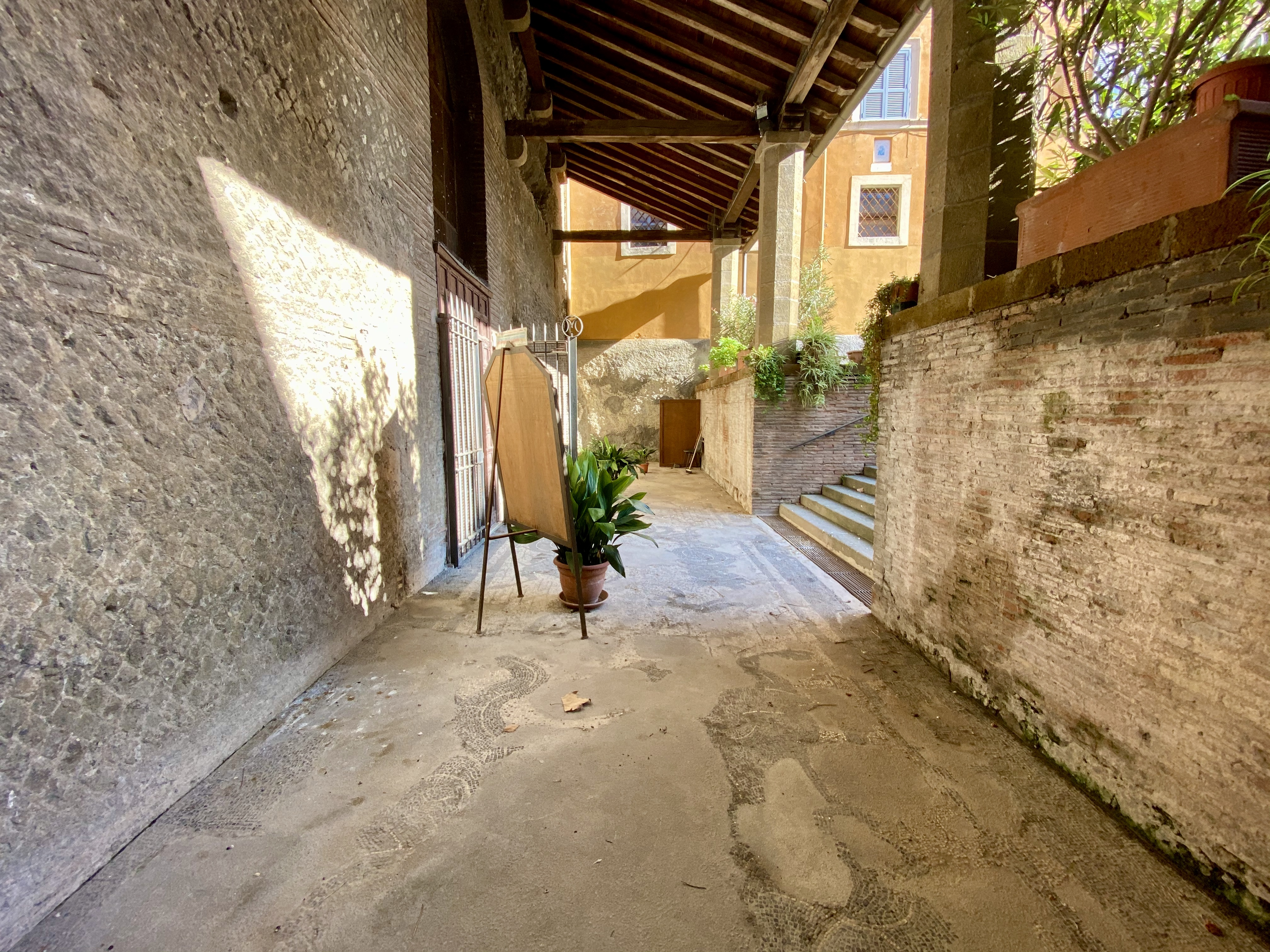
The narthex of the sanctuary, with traces of Roman mosaic.

The erection of the building with a perfectly cubic plan within which a sphere is inscribed, later to be used as a sanctuary, is dated by all scholars to the imperial age, under the principate of Titus Flavius Domitian (81 - 96).

However, disagreements arise as to what function this imposing structure had in the complex of Domitian's monumental villa, which encompassed practically the entire crater of Lake Albano and had its residential center at the present Villa Barberini, in the extra-territorial complex of the papal villas of Castel Gandolfo. Tradition claimed that the building was conceived as a temple dedicated to the goddess Minerva, since the Emperor Domitian was very devoted to that deity and it is attested by some classical authors that in the Albanum Domitiani -that is, in the Domitian villa- the Quinquatria, solemn festivals in honor of Minerva, were celebrated:

Celebrabat et in Albano quotannis Quinquatria Minervae, cui collegium instituerat, ex quo sorte ducti magisterio fungerentur ederentque eximias venationes et scaenicos ludos superque oratorum ac poetarum certamina.
Suetonius, De vita XII Caesarum - Vita Domitiani, VIII, 4.
He celebrated in the Alban villa every year the Quinquatria festivities of Minerva, in whose honor he had founded a college, whose task was to carry out the oracles and notify the great hunts and shows and also the competitions of orators and poets.

Archaeologist Giovanni Battista de Rossi claimed that the building was a temple dedicated to the Sun and the Moon -Solis et Lunae- but scholar Giuseppe Lugli states that he had not been able to ascertain why de Rossi made this claim, and in addition he argues that the building does not have the plan of a Roman temple, and furthermore it could not have been a bath house either, but, proceeding to a comparison with other Roman buildings with a circular plan inscribed in a square, he comes to the conclusion that the sanctuary of Rotonda in the Domitian age was founded as a nymphaeum.

The most common modern view, in light of the archaeological excavations and restorations of 1935-1938, is precisely that the building was an isolated nymphaeum at the edge of the imperial estate.

With the founding of the Castra Albana (the fortified encampments of the Legio II Parthica, which arose around 197 during the principate of Emperor Septimius Severus), the ancient nymphaeum was probably repurposed as a pagan place of worship: this would be evidenced by a peperino cult altar found during the 1935-1938 excavations at the level of the Severan floor, which was slightly raised above the Domitian floor. After the Severan age, as some of the surrounding buildings collapsed and were gradually abandoned, the future sanctuary began to gradually become buried. In the course of the earthworks in the 1930s, a layer of soil mixed with wheat seeds was found: this would suggest a continuation of pagan worship in the last centuries of the empire, and would exclude that consecration as a Christian church took place immediately at the time of Constantine the Great. The latter would take place only later, by eastern clerics around the 8th century.

=== Christian use ===
==== First consecration – 14th century ====
There is a tradition in the Volgo Albanense, that in this persecution some of those fleeing Greek Nuns withdrew to their City, that they brought with them that Image of our Lady, today called of the Rotonda, and that they exposed it to public veneration in that round Temple, at other times dedicated to Minerva [...].

— Giovanni Antonio Ricci

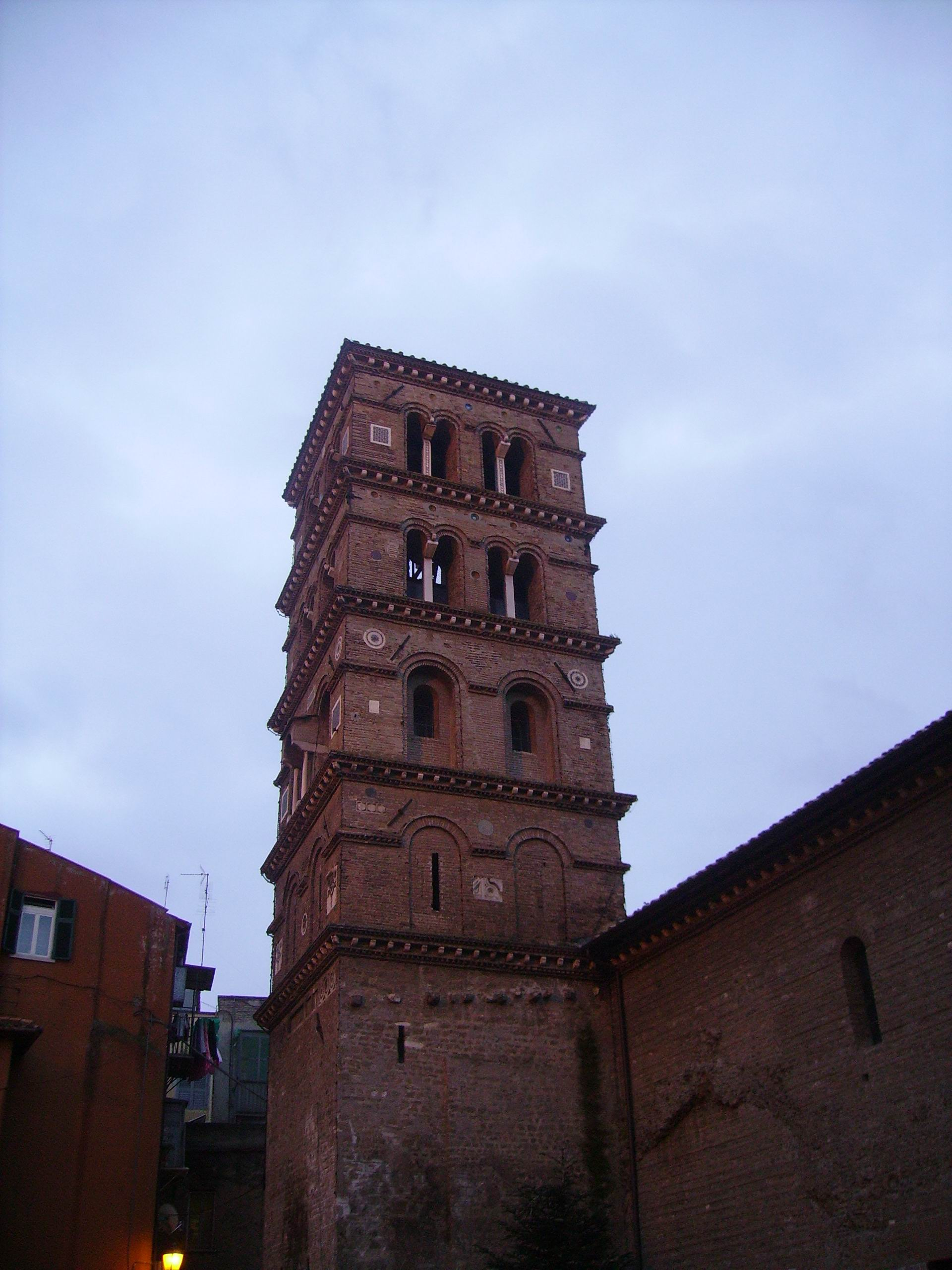
The Romanesque bell tower of St. Peter's Church in Albano Laziale, essentially identical -except in size- to the bell tower of the Rotonda.

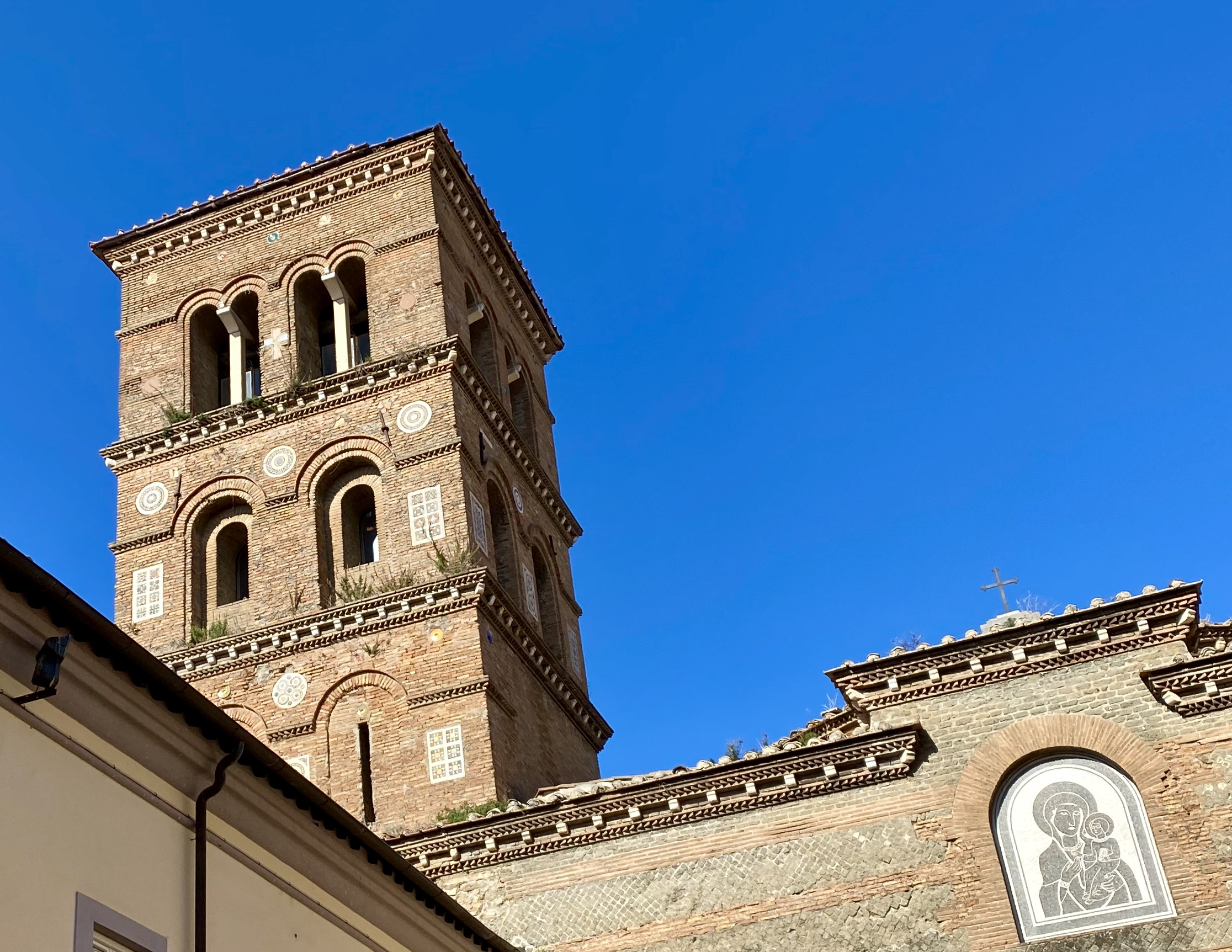
Detail of the bell tower of the Rotonda sanctuary (November 2020).

It is widely believed that the Christian sanctuary was founded by Eastern-rite religious devoted to iconodulism who fled the Byzantine Empire at a time when iconoclasm was raging. For all intents and purposes, the image of Our Lady of the Rotonda is a Western work that can be dated between the 6th and 8th centuries or between the 11th and 12th centuries; and the earliest medieval-era artifacts found during archaeological excavations at the sanctuary are fragments of marble braid decoration referable to the period between the 9th and 10th centuries.

In any case, the first consecration of the sanctuary of which there is any record took place on December 7, 1060, when Pope Nicholas II was reigning: the church was dedicated in ancient Greek to the Most Holy Mother of God. At the consecration, Cardinal Bishop Bonifacio with Archdeacon Gregorio took care to have a paper fragment walled into the high altar of the sanctuary in memory of the consecration itself, along with numerous relics belonging to St. Sabinus, Pope St. Sylvester I and the Most Holy John and Paul. The paper fragment, along with the relics and a marble plaque with an inscription in ancient Greek, was found during the recognition of the altar made before the second consecration of the sanctuary in 1316.

However, the oldest official document in which the sanctuary of Santa Maria della Rotonda is mentioned is a letter from Pope Celestine III dated December 16, 1195, in which a plot of land "positi in territorio Albanensi in Caccabellis" bordering on one side with "S. Maria Rotonda de Albano" is mentioned.

It is unclear who managed the sanctuary during this period. Galletti has cautiously speculated that the sanctuary may have belonged to the abbey of Santa Maria di Grottaferrata, which had numerous properties in the Albano area; however, according to surviving archival material, it can be assumed that the church was governed in the early 13th century by an archpriest in the employ of the suburbicarian diocese of Albano, and in the early 14th century by a chaplain in the employ of Augustinian nuns.

On September 8, 1316, the sanctuary was re-consecrated at the request of the abbess of the Augustinian nuns' convent, Sister Agnes. The celebration, at which a recognition of the relics placed in 1060 inside the high altar was carried out, was presided over by Nicholas bishop of Tortiboli.

The sanctuary, throughout the 14th century, was the object of abundant donations from ordinary people, and also from Roman citizens, which unquestionably enriched the community of nuns that ruled it.

Thus it was that in 1369 a dispute arose between the free commune of Velletri on the one hand, and on the other the Guglielminian monks of the church of San Paolo and the Augustinian nuns of the Rotonda, both supported by the cardinal bishop of Albano, Angel de Grimoard. In fact, the two convents accused the Velletrans of having plundered them and demanded compensation. Pope Urban V, from Avignon, appointed the cardinal bishop of Sabina Guillaume d'Aigrefeuille the Younger as judge-commissioner to investigate the affair: it is unknown how the dispute ended.

==== 15th century – 17th century ====
In March 1436 or 1435 Albano, along with Castel Gandolfo, Castel Savello and the Borghetto of Grottaferrata -all fiefs of the Savelli family- was razed to the ground by the papal militia commanded by Cardinal Giovanni Maria Vitelleschi during one of the wars between Pope Eugene IV and the Roman baronial families. Subsequently, on June 15, 1444, the destroyed and abandoned churches and convents were granted by Eugene IV himself to the Girolamini religious of the basilica of Saints Boniface and Alexius in Rome: among them, the sanctuary of the Rotonda with all its annexed and related property is also reported.

In the early years of the 17th century, there was a great fervor in making embellishments and new altars in the sanctuary. However, as early as during the apostolic visitation of Monsignor Marco Antonio Tommasi in 1661, a neglected situation of the sanctuary was attested, whose jurisdiction still belonged to the Girolamini monks of the basilica of the Most Holy Boniface and Alessius. Thus, the cardinal bishop of the suburbicarian see of Albano Giovanni Battista Pallotta decided to challenge the apostolic constitution Instaurandae regularis disciplinae issued in 1652 by Pope Innocent X - "super soppressione parvorum conventuum, ac prohibitione erigendi novos" (i.e., "on the suppression of small convents and the prohibition of erecting new ones")-: therefore, on August 6, 1663, the diocese purchased the convent and some surrounding dwellings from the Girolamini monks for the price of 1250 scudi.

In 1667 Cardinal Bishop Ulderico Carpegna had the seat of the local bishop's seminary moved to the buildings purchased by the Diocese next to the sanctuary of Rotonda, after some restoration work. Further work on the interior of the sanctuary was carried out with funding from Cardinal Bishop Virginio Orsini in 1673, who had the lantern built on the central oculus of the dome and had it covered with lead.

==== 18th century ====
Pope Clement XI, by a papal brief dated June 19, 1708, granted the religious congregation of the Poor Clerics Regular of the Mother of God of the Pious Schools -widely called Piarists- the management of the bishop's seminary and the sanctuary.

On the occasion of Pope Benedict XIII's visit to Albano, on the sidelines of his return trip from an apostolic visit to Benevento in 1727, Cardinal Nicolò Maria Lercari had a chapel dedicated to St. Philip Neri built next to the sanctuary's sacristy: in fact, Benedict XIII had entrusted this saint with his own salvation during the 1703 earthquake when he was archbishop of Benevento.

On June 5, 1728, Monsignor Ranieri-Simonetti, canon of St. Peter's Basilica in the Vatican, solemnly crowned the image of Our Lady of the Rotonda in the presence of city authorities, the chapter of canons regular of St. Pancras Cathedral and local religious authorities.

During the famines of 1755, 1756, and 1779, popular tradition has it that many appealed to Our Lady of the Rotonda: in particular, in 1779 the large influx of the faithful led to the disruption of the altar steps.

After the French occupation of Rome on February 9, 1798, and the consequent proclamation of the Roman Republic on February 15, Frascati, Marino, Albano and Velletri formed themselves into as many autonomous republics twinned with the Roman one: just as in April 1798 a government commissioner took charge of the recovery of all the valuables from the sanctuary of Santa Maria di Galloro in Ariccia, so too was the case at the sanctuary of Rotonda, from which the Piarist monks had been expelled under the suppression of religious orders.

==== 19th and 20th centuries ====
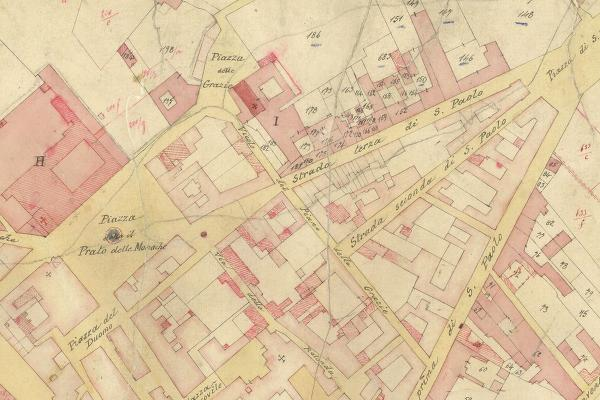
The Trident area of Albano in a map of the Piano-Gregorian cadastre (in effect between 1815 and 1870 in the territories of the Papal States): in the bottom center, the building marked with a Greek cross is the Rotonda.

In 1801, the care of the sanctuary was again entrusted to the diocesan clergy.

Between May 21 and December 5, 1829 as many as 248 earthquake tremors shook the area of the Alban Hills: the population of Albano, noting the small amount of damage to people and buildings, thought to attribute this to the intercession of Our Lady of the Rotonda, so much so that between August 22 and 30 of that year solemn celebrations were held for a new coronation of the image at the cathedral basilica of San Pancrazio. In 1833, some restoration and recovery work was carried out on the building, which had been profoundly altered from its original Roman appearance, and a gouache decoration, among others, was carried out, which was later renewed in 1883 because it was ruined.

The cardinal bishop of the suburbicarian see of Albano, Lodovico Altieri, in a report dated December 15, 1864, of his ad limina visit to the sanctuary, stated that Madonna della Rotonda was also known as "Madonna del Suffragio". The Albanese people particularly resorted to the intercession of Our Lady of the Rotonda in the 19th century, in the circumstances of the cholera of 1837, the droughts of 1844 and 1847, the earthquake of 1850, of the cryptogamic epidemic of 1855, of the hailstorms of 1858 and 1861, and for the devastating cholera epidemic of 1867, which claimed among its victims the aforementioned cardinal-bishop Lodovico Altieri.

In 1878 Cardinal-Bishop Gustav Adolf von Hohenlohe-Schillingsfürst ordered a new facade for the sanctuary, of Doric order, designed by architect Mariano Salustri: meanwhile, the floor inside the sanctuary was redone.

The image of Our Lady of the Rotonda was solemnly crowned for the third time on May 14, 1905, in the presence of the cardinal bishop of the suburbicarian see of Albano Antonio Agliardi. The crown affixed to the image in 1829, along with other attached jewels and some votive offerings, had in fact been the object of a sacrilegious theft in October 1904. In nearby Marino, as well, the venerated image of Our Lady of the People, kept in the basilica of St. Barnabas, was the object of no less than two sacrilegious thefts in those same years: Three local anarchists were sentenced to three years' imprisonment for that crime, but there is no proven evidence to link the two thefts in Albano and Marino.

The first restorations in the modern sense of the sanctuary (not renovations, but works aimed at recovering the Roman structure) date back to 1919, when the four side niches were recovered, bringing to light behind an 18th-century or early 19th-century partition the 14th-century frescoes of the History of the True Cross. In 1931 a city committee was created to promote restorations to the dome of the sanctuary: the Regia Soprintendenza ai Monumenti per il Lazio thus had the first work done on the structure, finding, however, considerable problems in the entire building. Between 1933 and 1934, an organic project was drawn up to restore the entire monument to its original Roman appearance: the extensive work went on from 1935 to 1938. It involved consolidating the dome; lowering the floor, bringing it back 3.30 meters below the street level, to the Roman level; restoring the brick curtain and resuming the travertine ribs supporting the dome; arranging the apse and the side niches; and bringing to light the 14th-century frescoes obscured over the following centuries.

The high altar of the renovated sanctuary was consecrated on August 5, 1938: however, the sanctuary was not officially officiated until July 25, 1949 by Cardinal Bishop Giuseppe Pizzardo.

The city of Albano suffered the first and most massive Allied aerial bombardment during World War II on February 1, 1944, along with Ariccia: many inhabitants of Albano devoutly entrusted themselves to Our Lady of the Rotonda so that she would rescue them from the wartime events. The damage suffered by the sanctuary structure was estimated on June 26, 1944. A subsequent survey of the sanctuary was carried out on July 20, 1948, and it was found to be necessary to cover the roof with a metal mesh and wooden fixtures to prevent rainwater infiltration. On June 28, 1949, a survey was carried out on the Romanesque bell tower, which brought the beginning of the work to October 1951. The work carried out gave that architectural element the appearance it still possesses today.

In 1960 the sanctuary was closed due to excessive humidity, oscillating between 87 percent and 95 percent, which damaged not only the works of art but also the health of the faithful. The episode represented an interesting case in the field of hygienic rehabilitation of buildings: in fact, the dampness was initially attributed to evaporation of the perimeter wall to a height of about five feet; later, new analyses attributed the cause not only to the perimeter wall, but especially to the ancient floor -200 m² of condensing surface-, located after the 1935-1938 restorations about 3 meters below street level. The solution was therefore to remove the ancient mosaic floor and replace it with a new one equipped with an air chamber.

In 1979, the last restoration works to the 14th-century pictorial cycles in the side niches were carried out by the Soprintendenza ai Monumenti per il Lazio.

During the works on the occasion of the Great Jubilee of 2000, the church was restored by architect Marco Silvestri. The works consisted, in addition to the restoration inside the niches and outside the two facades, in the construction of the large snail staircase placed in the bell tower to replace the worn-out "temporary" staircase made during the works of Terenzio. The staircase has the unique characteristic of not resting on the ground but being completely suspended ramp by ramp by steel tie rods. This avoided interfering with any archaeological remains in the hypogean substrate.

Pope Leo XIV attended the sanctuary in August 2025.

== Description ==
We thus have a small Pantheon, representing the same proportions between plan and elevation, in that the section is a perfect circle and the vault is built in horizontal layers, without ribs or arches: a round hole in the middle increases the light, while a well in the center of the floor, provided with a long burrow, conveyed rainwater to the drain.

— Giuseppe Lugli

=== Evolution ===
The building was most likely built during the reign of Titus Flavius Domitian (81 - 96) and belonged to the complex of Domitian's villa, the ruins of which are for the most part incorporated into the present papal villas of Castel Gandolfo. Evidence of this, according to the Albanese archaeologist Giuseppe Lugli, are two aquarian fistulas found in the 16th century under the nearby Palazzo Savelli:

IMP · CAESARIS · DOMITIANI · AVG · GERMANICI

— CIL XIV, 02306

[...] · AVTEIVS · FORTVNATIS · FECIT

— CIL XIV, 02311

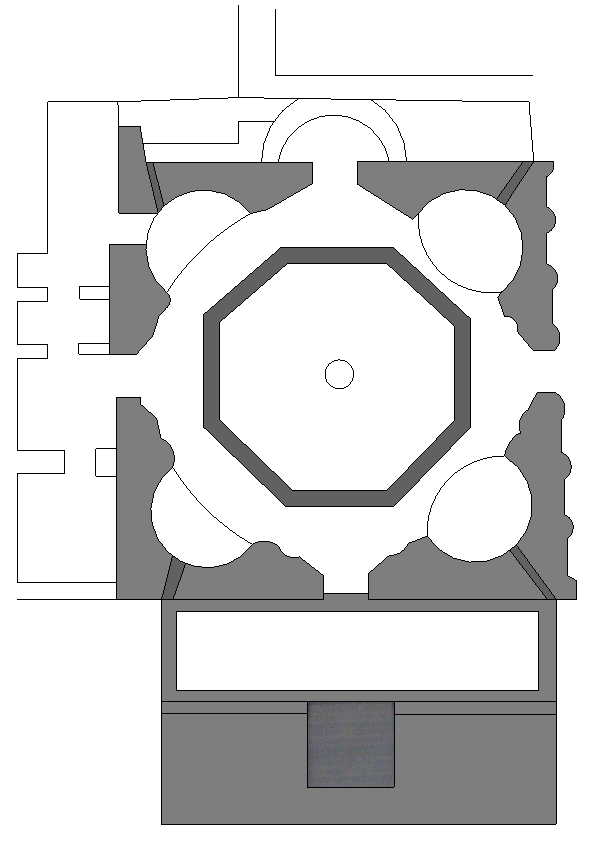
The floor plan of the Rotonda sanctuary

The aquarian fistulas in question, according to Lugli's reconstruction, belonged to the rainwater drainage system of the present sanctuary -at the time almost certainly a nymphaeum rather than a temple as proposed by some archaeologists- and were connected to some thermal rooms located under the present-day Palazzo Camerale and Palazzo Savelli, which in turn were connected in the Severan age with the imposing Baths of Caracalla, the ruins of which still stand near the Albano train station.

At the time of its construction, the building's interior consisted of a cylinder inscribed in a cube and covered by a hemisphere, all built entirely of opus mixtum in the likeness -reduced in scale- of Rome's Pantheon.

With the construction, on the edge of Domitian's villa, of the later Castra Albana under the reign of Septimius Severus, a rectangular antechamber was built around 183 in front of the original building, which allows one to conclude that the entrance to the building was already the present one. In addition, new buildings arose around the quadrangular structure of the church, which collapsed with the abandonment of the Castra Albana in the 4th century and whose ruins were found during excavations in 1935-1938.

New work was carried out at an undetermined time between the 8th and 11th centuries as a result of the consecration of the Roman building into a Christian church: the floor was raised by 1.75 meters, and a 4.50-meter-diameter apse was added to the building, which originally lacked one, the remains of whose white marble block floor were found in the 1935-1938 excavations. It was not until around the 12th century that the present apse was built, as Lugli asserts by analyzing the peperino corbels and pointed bricks that constitute it. With the readaptation into a place of Christian worship, the four Roman niches were converted into chapels; in the 14th century the sanctuary was enriched with frescoed pictorial cycles, such as the History of the True Cross and St. Anne.

After a period of severe decline, which lasted throughout the period in which the sanctuary was owned by the monks of the basilica of the Most Holy Boniface and Alexius in Rome, that is, between 1444 and 1663, many changes were made to the structure of the sanctuary in the 17th century, with the building being remodeled according to the taste of Baroque architecture: the culmination of this was reached with the covering of the central oculus of the dome by a lantern, a work commissioned in 1673 by Cardinal Bishop Virginio Orsini.

In the 19th century there was a renewed interest in the architecture of the sanctuary: some work was carried out on the occasion of the second coronation of the image of Our Lady in 1829, while in 1878 the floor and facade were redone.

All extraneous interventions to the Roman and Byzantine architecture of the origins were erased during the 1935-1938 restorations, which aimed to restore the building to its original purity: therefore, the 17th-century lantern was removed, the bricks of the walls were freed from the 18th-century stuccoes, the side niches were reopened, and the floor was restored to the Domitian level -that is, more than three meters below street level. The church currently retains the appearance given to it in the 1930s, except for the restoration work done in the 1960s on the floor to stem the humidity in the place of worship.

=== Exterior ===
==== Facade ====
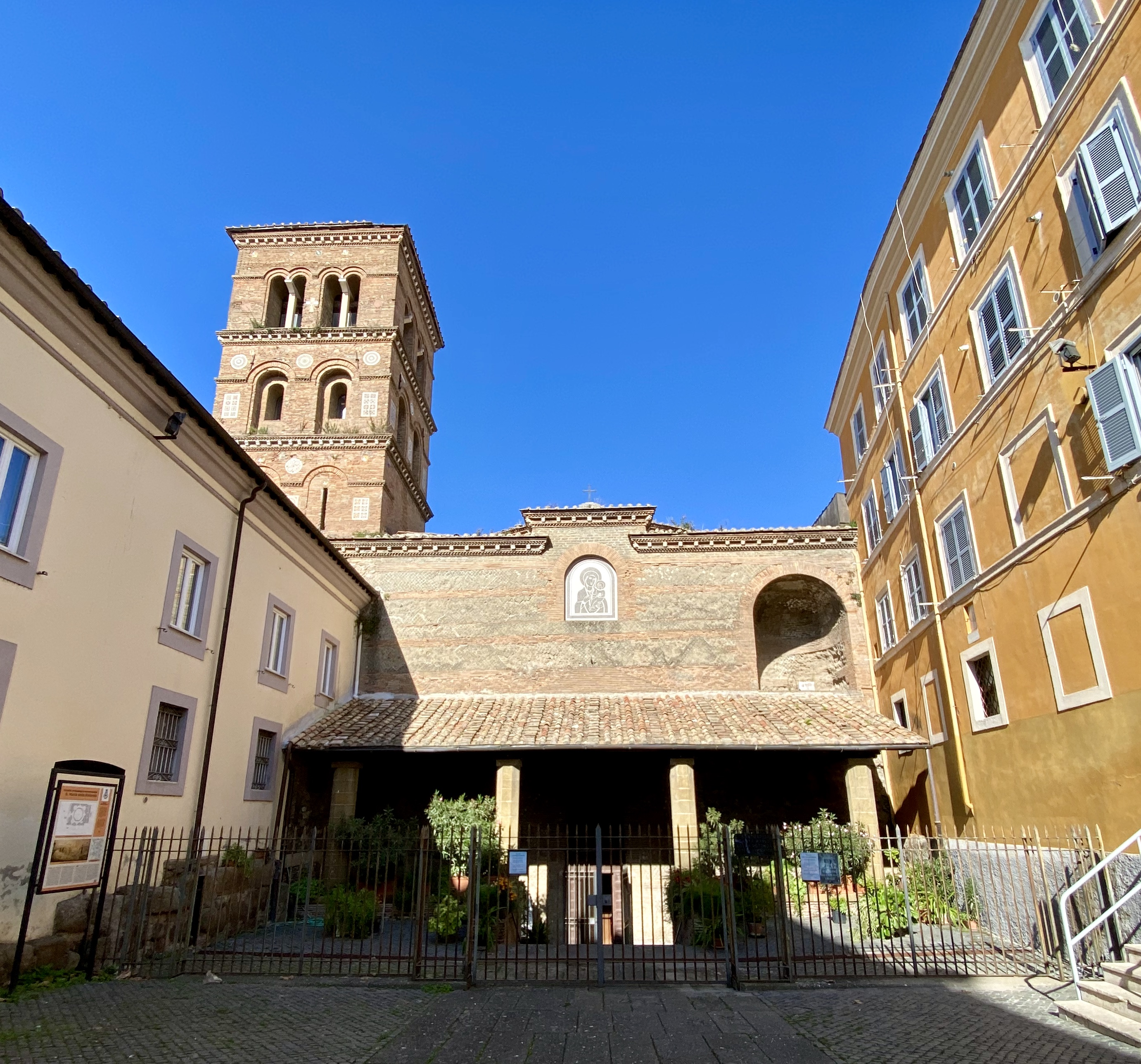
Detail of the facade of the sanctuary, restored following the 1935-1938 restoration (November 2020).

In the 18th century, as shown in an engraving by the painter Carlo Labruzzi (1748-1817), the facade was simply a plastered wall on which opened a door surrounded by fine Roman marble entablatures; two of them were photographed by Lugli, while currently one of them, measuring 1.70 x 1.00 x 0.50 meters, supports the high altar mensa. In 1878 the cardinal bishop of the suburbicarian see of Albano Gustav Adolf von Hohenlohe-Schillingsfürst contributed financially, together with the Albanese community and wealthy villagers, to the construction of a new facade for the sanctuary, of Doric order, designed by architect Mariano Salustri. This facade, 15 meters high and 12 meters wide, featured at the top the following inscription in iron letters:

DEIPARAE A ROTVNDA

This facade, too, was demolished during the 1935-1938 restorations, and in its place a rectangular portico measuring 16.30 x 4.35 meters was built, inside which the original floor of the Roman building, made of black and white tesseras with designs of sea monsters, was placed in 1954.

The gate in front of the portico, built after the 1935-1938 restorations, was moved backward by permission of the Albano municipal administration on June 17, 1977.

==== Bell tower ====
The bell tower, a remarkable example of Romanesque architecture datable to the early 14th century, was restored to its original appearance after "modernization" works carried out in the 17th century -when it was covered with stucco- and in 1708.

On October 12, 1949, and July 2, 1951, two technical surveys found the need for work on the sanctuary's bell tower. On November 15, 1951, a contract was signed with the architect Perenzio and the company Mengoni, and work began: the existing holes in the lower part of the bell tower were walled in, cosmatesque tiles were added, and the cornice was completed. In addition, the interior staircase was fixed and gutters were made.

=== Interior ===
As for the latest restoration, which completely restored the inner vase of the Roman thermal hall and created in the Rotonda the most monumental temple of the Alban diocese [...] we will only add that in the restoration an attempt was made to make maximum use of the material recovered from the excavation, not backing down before the need to carry out works in a fragmentary style in order to alter as little as possible the very peculiar character of the classical monument.

— Alberto Galletti

The circular interior, which before the 1935-1938 restorations had a diameter of 15.60 meters, currently measures 16.10 meters in diameter: the circumference has remained unchanged at 49.10 meters.

==== Side niches ====
After the restorations of 1935-1938, it became clear that the four side niches, located at the diagonals of the building, were originally enriched by a jet of water falling into four fountains with mosaic floors.

In the Christian era the four niches, which were progressively buried, were used as minor altars. After the first consecration in 1060, some scholars have speculated that the four minor altars might have been dedicated to the four saints whose relics were placed in the act of consecration, namely Saint Sabinus, Saint Sylvester I, Saint Saba, and Saints John and Paul. During excavations in 1919, in fact, a row of four blocks of white marble and one of peperino 60 centimeters wide, which may have belonged to the threshold of a Christian altar, was discovered at a depth of about 1.95 meters below the floor of the then church.

On the occasion of the consecration in 1316, new changes were made to the use of the niches: in the first niche on the right from the entrance, a chapel dedicated to St. Helena was made, in which the pictorial cycle of the History of the True Cross was found in 1919. The first niche on the left, however, was partially walled in to support the bell tower; the remaining two niches were walled in and used as a passageway and sacristy.

During the 17th century, several works were carried out in the niches: for example, in 1616 the Roman citizen Lelio Santori had an altar dedicated to St. Charles Borromeo built on the right wall of the sanctuary. The niches were restored to their original appearance only in the first decades of the 20th century, and that appearance is the one preserved to this day.

==== Dome ====
The dome, with a maximum circumference of 49.10 meters, has three levels of sloping roof on the outside, culminating in the central oculus.

In 1673 the hole itself was enclosed by a lantern, during work financed by Cardinal Bishop Virginio Orsini. The 17th-century lantern was dismantled with the 1935-1938 restorations.

The last work on the dome, concerning the arrangement of the roof by means of wire mesh and wooden fixtures, was ordered after the survey of July 20, 1948.

==== Floor ====
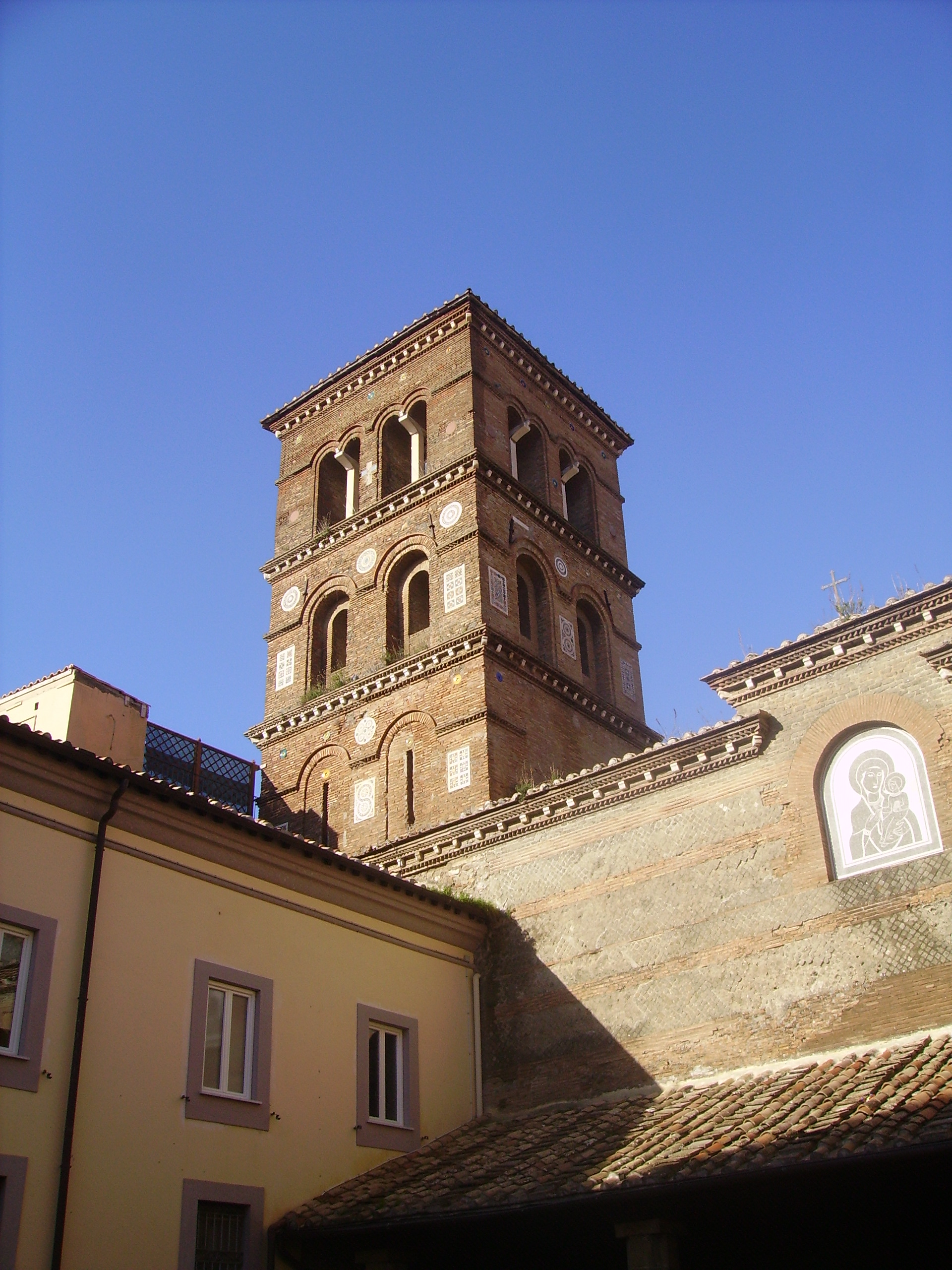
An image of the sanctuary's Romanesque bell tower.

The original floor of the Roman building from the Domitian period was already covered in the Severan period, when with the new adaptation of the building as a spa room a mosaic floor -now moved to the portico in front of the main entrance- raised 12 centimeters above the previous one. Between the fall of the Western Roman Empire and the 11th century, when there is mention of the first consecration of the church, the floor level rose about 1.75 meters: in the fill, emptied during the excavations of 1935-1938, a Roman peperino altar, a layer of toasted wheat grains, even a burial of a Roman legionnaire were found, giving an idea of the multiplicity of functions that the building assumed in the smoky period of the early Middle Ages.

In the passage of centuries between the second consecration (1316) and the substantial interventions of the early 17th century, the floor level turns out to have been raised 1.90 meters above the floor that was of the original church, thus more than two meters above the Roman floor: the raising of the surrounding street level, in fact, led to the tendency to cancel out the difference in height between the floor of the church and the floor of the square in front, which nevertheless resulted in the substantial concealment of the side niches.

On the occasion of the second coronation of the image of Our Lady of the Rotonda in 1829, a new brick pavement was put in place, located 25 centimeters higher than the previous 17th-century one; this pavement was concealed by a later pavement put in place in 1883 by the then primary physician of Albano Dr. Pietro Santolamazza. This pavement, dismantled only during the 1935-1938 restorations, was composed of black and white marble bricks framed in octagons.

As already mentioned, in 1935-1938 the church's floor level was restored to its original Domitian-era floor level, 3.30 meters lower than the street level: the Severan mosaics were also brought back to light. However, due to very high air humidity -oscillating between 87 percent and 95 percent-, in 1960 the church was closed to worship and floor work was put in place to remedy the inconvenience. In place of the mosaics, which were moved to the portico in front of the entrance to the sanctuary, the present floor with an air chamber was made.

==== Apse ====
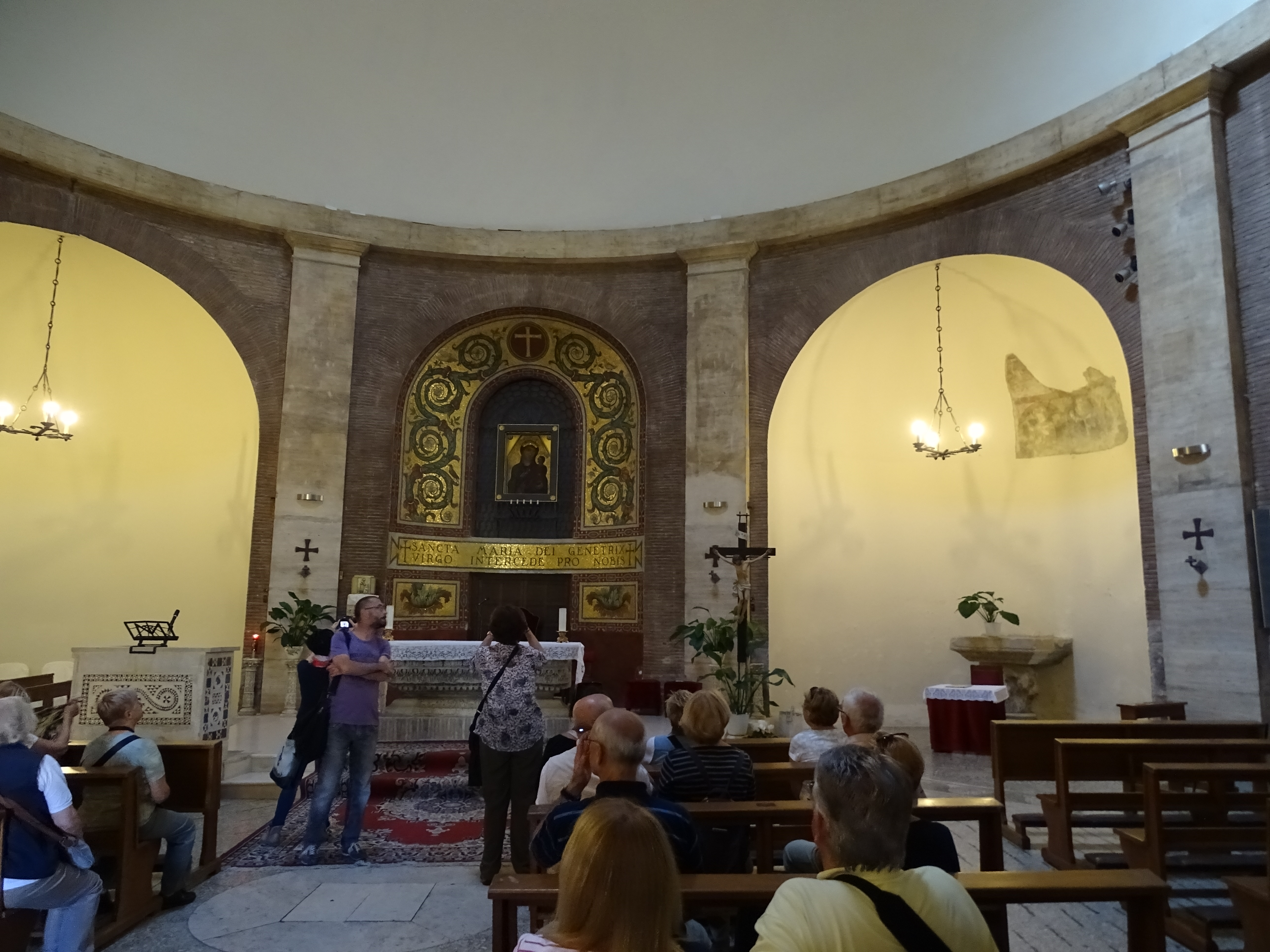
Interior

The apse area, an element unrelated to the original Roman structure, owes its present appearance to the restorations of 1935-1938. The presbytery underwent interventions in the 17th century -with the construction of the "machine" that supported the image of Our Lady of the Rotonda- and then in the 19th century. The Baroque "machine" that supported the image of Our Lady consisted of two twisted columns supporting a broken tympanum on which two stucco statues depicting Fortitude and Justice were arranged, lying down. In the center of it, in a gilded wooden frame supported by two stucco angels, was the venerated Marian image. The 17th-century high altar was made of Carrara marble. In 1833 Roman citizen Dionisio Baldini financed the rebuilding of the balustrade and floor of the chancel, and also of the ciborium and steps of the high altar.

The present high altar, reconsecrated on August 5, 1938, is supported by the aforementioned marble fragment of a cornice from the imperial age, which until 1878 served as the entablature of the sanctuary door.

The ambon consists of an Attic column base surmounted by a composite capital and fragments of Byzantine and Romanesque cornices, all of which were found in the earthwork of the sanctuary during the restorations. The baptismal font is a truncated black marble column, also found in the fill of the modern floor.

The gold-ground mosaic of the arch in the apse area is a 1930s work by the Vatican School of Mosaic on a cardboard by Professor Biagio Biagetti, inspired by Jacopo Torriti's 14th-century mosaic in the apse of the basilica of Santa Maria Maggiore in Rome.

==== Sacristy ====
The sacristy was added to the nymphaeum in the Christian era, probably taken from a building adjoining the sanctuary. In the early 14th century it was already enlarged through the closing of one of the four Roman side niches. A chapel dedicated to St. Philip Neri was added to the sacristy in 1727 at the initiative of Cardinal Nicolò Maria Lercari.

On September 15, 1965, the municipal administration of Albano proposed a project to complete the arrangement of the sanctuary's sacristy: this project was approved on October 25 by the Superintendence. Currently, a small antiquarium is set up in the sacristy, in which fragments of sarcophagi and burial inscriptions of the soldiers of the Legio II Parthica and the funerary stele with an inscription in ancient Greek of the child Eutyches, who died at the age of two and was found buried at the sanctuary, are preserved.

== Festivities ==
A Feast of Our Lady of the Rotonda had probably been celebrated since the 11th century, that is, from the time of the first consecration of the sanctuary as a place of Christian worship. However, it was not until after the cholera epidemic of 1867 that the first Sunday in August was established as the feast day dedicated to Our Lady of the Rotonda, and it still remains as such.

Special feasts were held on the occasion of the first coronation of the image, which took place on June 5, 1728, the second coronation, in 1829, for which a solemn novena was held in the cathedral basilica of St. Pancras between August 22 and 30 of that year, and the third and last coronation, on May 14, 1905.

== See also ==
- Albano Cathedral
- Villa of Domitian
- Roman Castles
- Albano Laziale

== Bibliography ==
- AA., VV.; Terenzio, Alberto; Battista Trovalusci, Giovanni; Lugli, Giuseppe; Mathiae, Guglielmo; Galletti, Alberto; Bellagamba, Giovanni (1972). Il tempio di Santa Maria della Rotonda (II ed.). Albano Laziale: Graphikcenter.
- Apa, Mariano (1981). Santa Maria della Rotonda - Storia e affreschi (I ed.). Albano Laziale: Tipografia Arti Grafiche.
- Coarelli, Filippo (1981). Guide archeologhe Laterza - Dintorni di Roma (I ed.). Roma-Bari: Casa editrice Giuseppe Laterza & figli.
- Giuseppe Lugli (1969). "Castra Albana - Un accampamento fortificato al XV miglio della via Appia". In Assessorato alla Pubblica Istruzione del Comune di Albano Laziale (ed.). Studi e ricerche su Albano archeologica 1914-1967. Roma: Microfilm. pp. 211–265.
- Nibby, Antonio (1848). Analisi storico-topografico-antiquaria della carta de' dintorni di Roma. Vol. I (II ed.). Roma: Tipografia delle Belle Arti.
- Ricci, Giovanni Antonio (1787). Memorie storiche dell'antichissima città di Alba Longa e dell'Albano moderno. Roma: Giovanni Zempel.
