= Castra Albana =

Ancient Roman legionary fortress

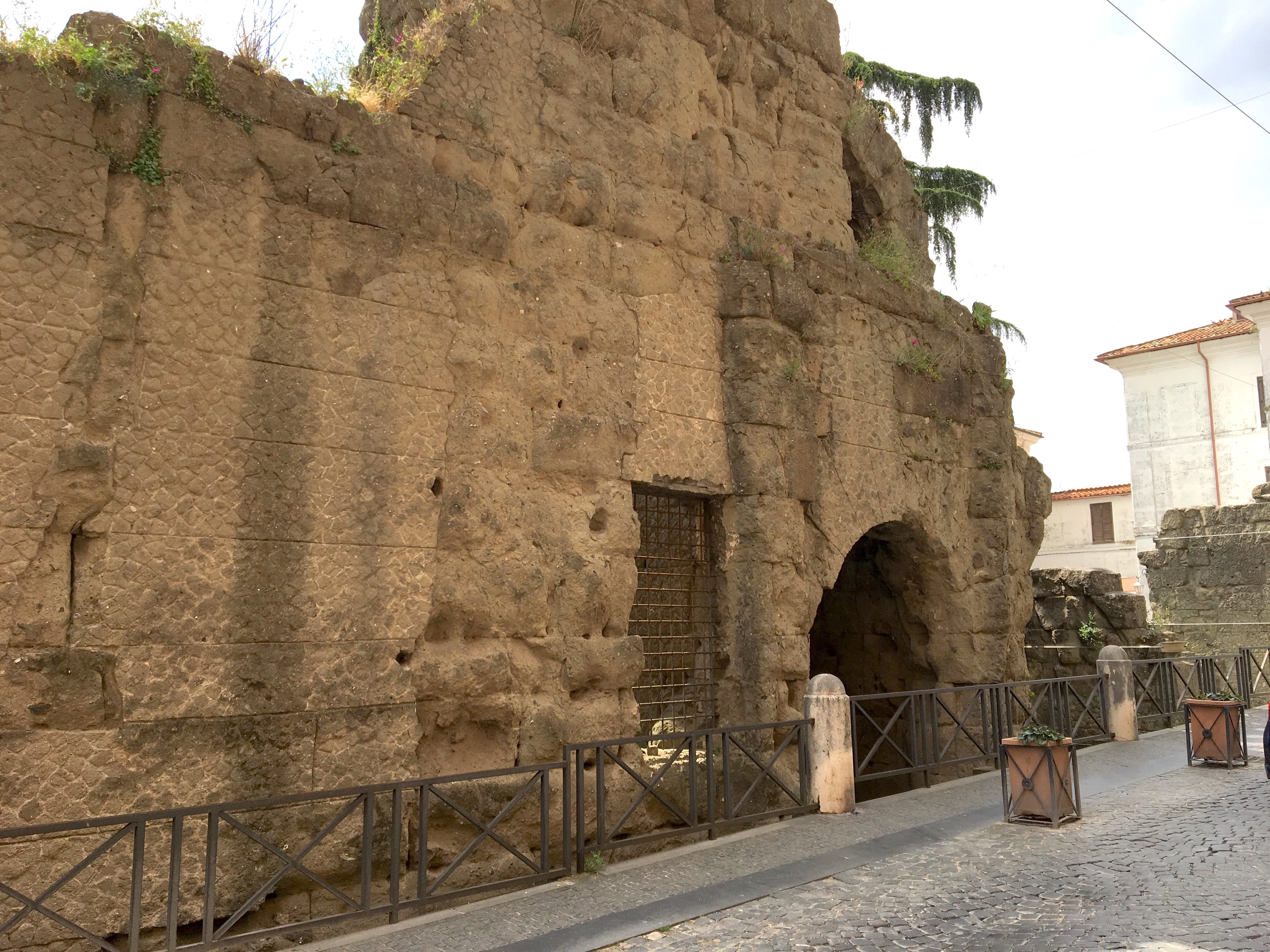
- The central arch of the porta Praetoria of the castra
- Interactive map of Castra Albana
- Location: Albano Laziale, Roma, Lazio, Italy

History
- Built: Septimius Severus

The Castra Albana [ˈkastra alˈbaːna] was an ancient Roman legionary fortress of the Legio II Parthica founded by the Emperor Septimius Severus (193–211) on the site of the present Albano Laziale.

It was the only permanent legionary fortress in Italy and had the role of protecting the emperor, while all other legions were distributed through the provinces for defence of the empire. It was located near to the imperial villa at the present Castel Gandolfo, and only about 20 km from Rome.

Today the remains of building both inside the castra and in the neighbouring civilian settlement, such as the so-called Baths of Caracalla and the Amphitheatre, can still be seen.

== History ==
=== The origin of the name ===
The fortress of Legio II Parthica was named Albana after the area which included Lacus Albanus, Mons Albanus, aqua Albana (perhaps an aqueduct on the south side of the lake), the rivus Albanus (probably the modern marana delle Pietrare near Marino) and "Albani Longani Bovillenses", the official name of the inhabitants of the municipium of Bovillae (located on the Appian Way near the modern village of Frattocchie), The adjective Albanus was also used as a poetic synonym for Romanus.

The legio II Parthica came to be known as legio Albana and its legionaries as Albani, even though the whole legion did not remain at the Castra Albana but had other encampments in Mesopotamia.

=== Republican Era to Domitian ===
The Appian Way was built in 312 BC to connect Rome with Capua and passed through the Alban Hills. in Campania. The ease of direct communication with Rome led to many suburban villas of Roman nobles being built in the area, including the villas of Publius Clodius Pulcher (near Ercolano in Castel Gandolfo). and perhaps of Pompey the Great (in the Villa Doria)

Nevertheless, until the time of Domitian, the stretch of the Appian Way between Bovillae and Aricia (modern Frattocchie in Marino and Ariccia) was completely free of buildings.

In the Republican period, the area of the later castra was occupied by fortifications remains of which were found at various points in central Albano Laziale.

Domitian built his palace near Castel Gandolfo on an estate containing several imperial properties, with an area of about 14 km^{2}. The villa was probably garrisoned by a detachment of the Praetorian Guard when the Emperor was in residence. The villa was frequently used by Domitian but later fell into disuse, on account of the construction of Villa of Hadrian at Tivoli in (117-136), who also began a policy of selling surplus Imperial property, including some of the villas on the edge of "Albanum Caesarum".

=== Septimius Severus to Philip the Arab ===
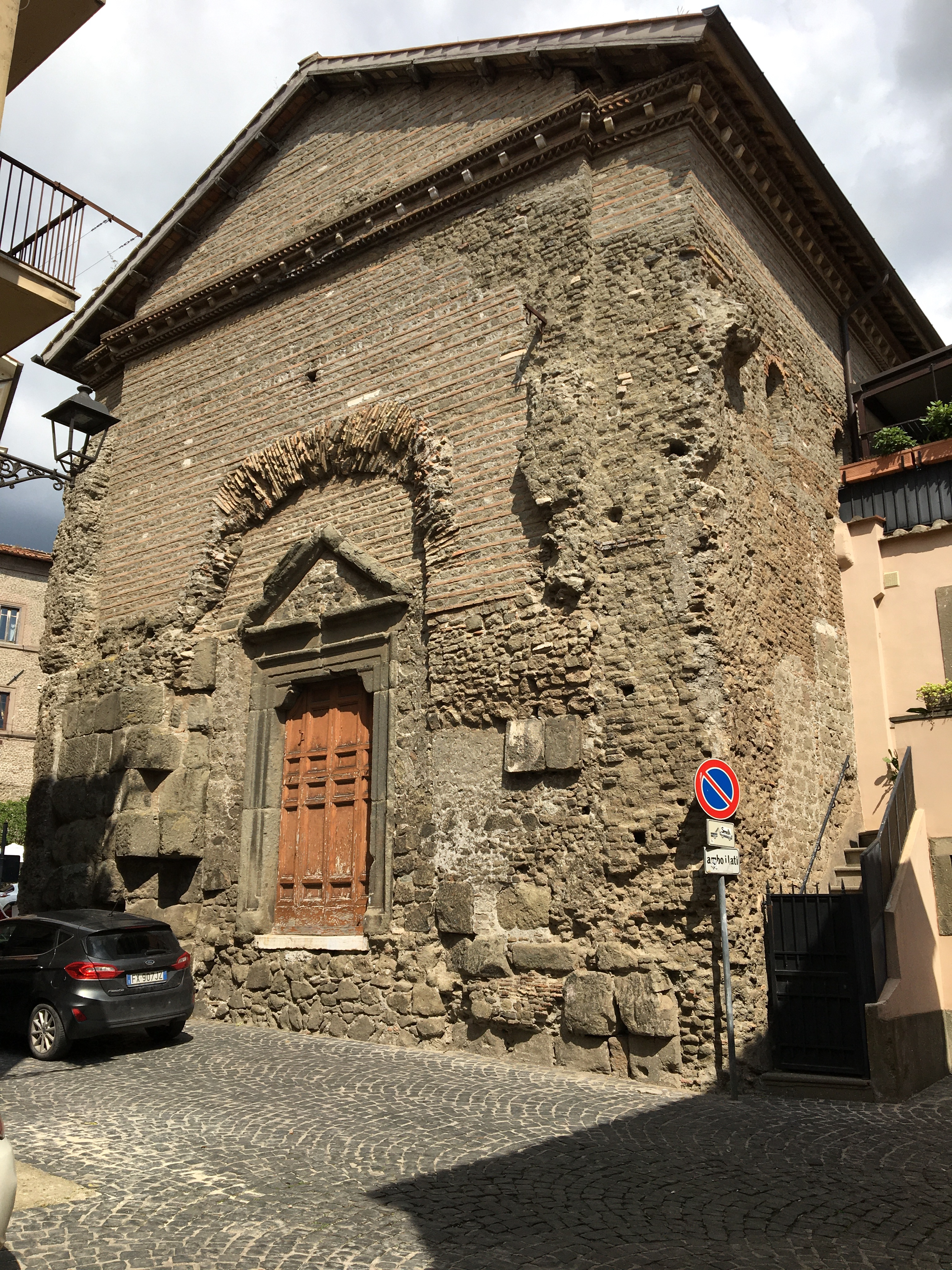
The Baths of Caracalla; the church of San Pietro is formed from one of the rooms

The castra was built in about 198 by Septimius Severus (193-211) who came to the throne after the Year of the Five Emperors and a violent civil war and temporarily dissolved the Praetorian Guard and brought the Legio II Parthica near Rome for his personal and political security. This legion had been created in 197 for the (successful) campaign against Parthia which ended in 198.

Its site on a steep slope had a panoramic view for observation of the Ager Romanus.

When Caracalla (211-217) came to power after assassinating his brother and co-emperor, Geta, the Legio Parthica refused to accept him as sole emperor. He went in person to Castra Albana and convinced the legion to remain loyal increasing their stipend by 50% and improving the camp by having the Baths of Caracalla built.

The amphitheatre was built in the middle of the 3rd century and could mark the end of the period of highest prosperity for the Legio II Parthica which may no longer have been there. The fortress was abandoned in the late 3rd or early 4th century and the civilian town expanded over it.

=== Decline of the castra after Constantine ===
Constantine I (306-337) founded the Cathedral of San Giovanni Battista at Albano Laziale during the pontificate of Pope Silvester I (314-335), providing it with decorations and substantial property nearby, including the sceneca deserta vel domos civitatis (the abandoned tents or the houses of the city). The modern Albano Laziale was built on the remains of the castra which are generally found up to 2 m below the modern ground level.

== Description ==
=== Circuit wall ===
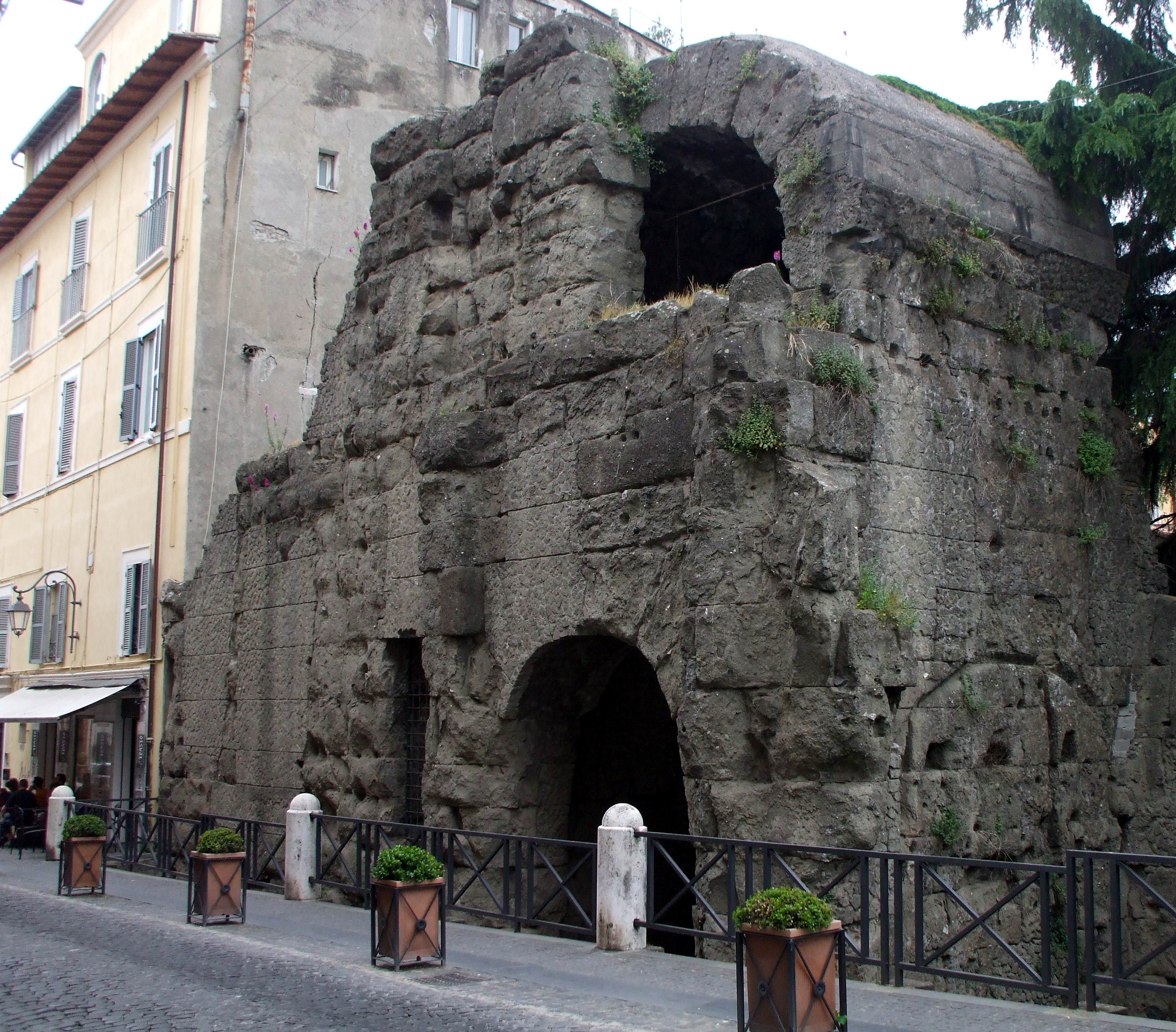
Porta Praetoria

Like all Roman castra, the Castra Albana followed a regular design of a large fortified rectangle with rounded corners reinforced by circular turrets (an unusual feature, but similar to the castra of Hadrian's Wall in Britain), and with four gates (praetoria, decumana, principalis sinistra and principalis dextra),. The walls are of opus quadratum, one of its latest appearances in the Ager Romanus (it was supplanted by Opus latericium). The construction material is Peperino, extracted in situ from the volcanic soil on which the castra was built. The construction was made difficult by the position of the encampment on an 11 degree slope. The perimeter of the wall circuit is 1334 metres with sides northwest 434 m, southeast 437 m, northeast 224 m, southwest 239 m. The total area is around 95,000 m^{2}.

Unlike other fortresses, there were no external defensive ditches or earthworks, as indicated by a road which ran just outside the walls.

==== Southwest side ====
The most substantial remains on this side are those of the porta praetoria, the monumental main entrance to the castra (instead of the more usual Porta Principalis), 36 m wide and still 14 m tall, and a unique example of legionary fortress architecture. It overlooked the Via Appia 20 m away which passed in front of it and was a form of imperial propaganda aimed at passing travellers. Located at the midpoint of the wall, the gate was incorporated into a later building until the devastating Anglo-American aerial bombardment of 1 February 1944. The central archway measures around 3 x 5 m with a height of 14 metres while the two side archways were a little over 1 x 5 m. The two side chambers each measure 5.4 x 5 m.

Further to the north, the wall is visible for stretches facing Via San Pancrazio. On the same street, the well-conserved remains of a circular guard tower can be accessed, 3.4 m below the modern ground level of the Via Alcide de Gasperi. The construction poses a problem: the vault of the single room is only 1.6 metres above the level of the intervallum and even allowing for the existence of a second story (per Giuseppe Lugli), the tower would not have reached a plausible height to be a guard tower. The conclusion is that this was a special construction, perhaps only for symmetry with the now-destroyed tower of the southeast corner. At any rate, it has a diameter of 1.2 m, a height of 2.1 m and its walls are 0.9 m thick. Other remains of the wall on this side were found in 1913, during the construction of the modern piazza Giosuè Carducci, and more have been incorporated into the foundations of modern houses.

==== Northeast side ====
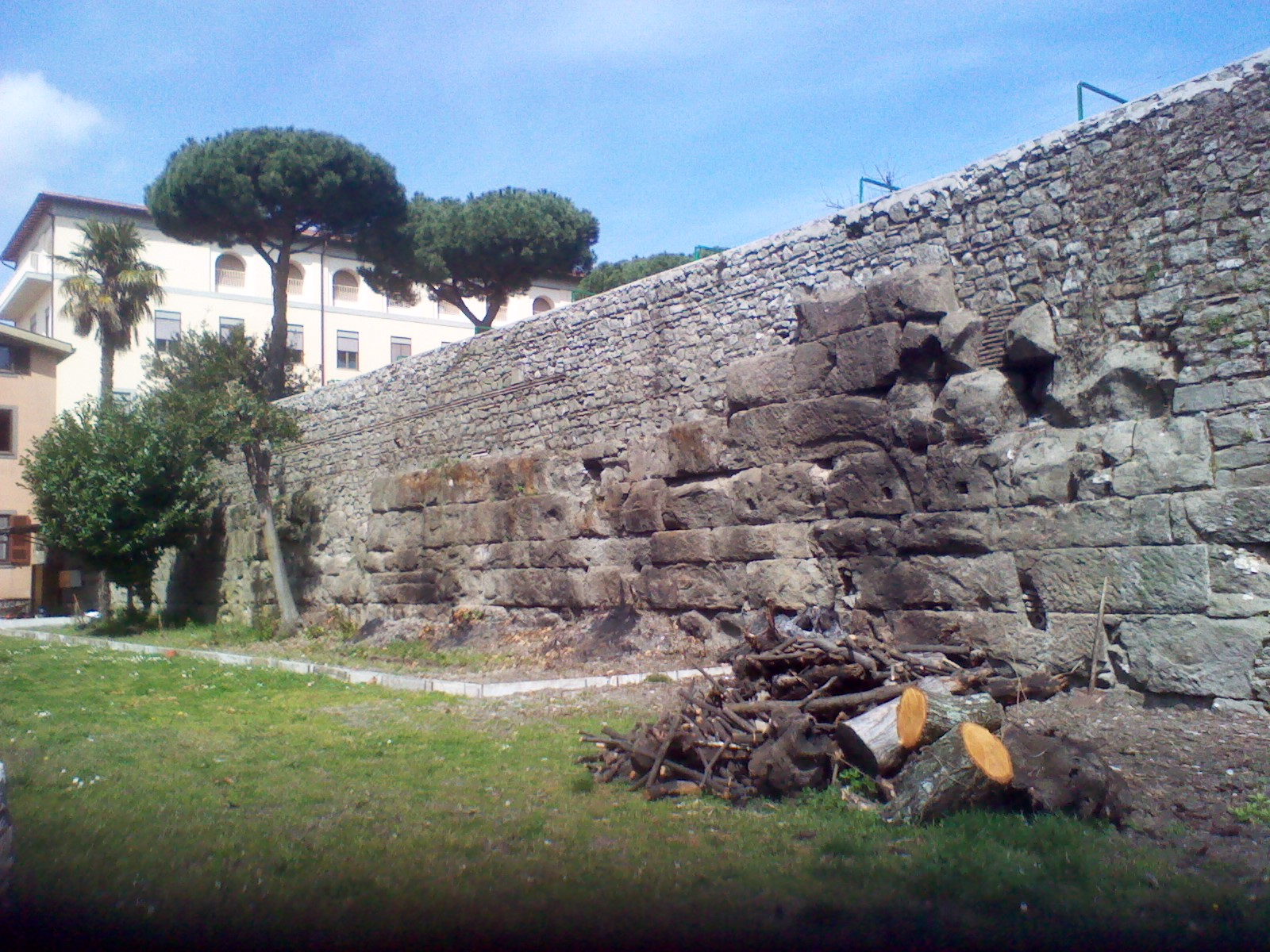
Northeast side. The decumana gate must have been in this section

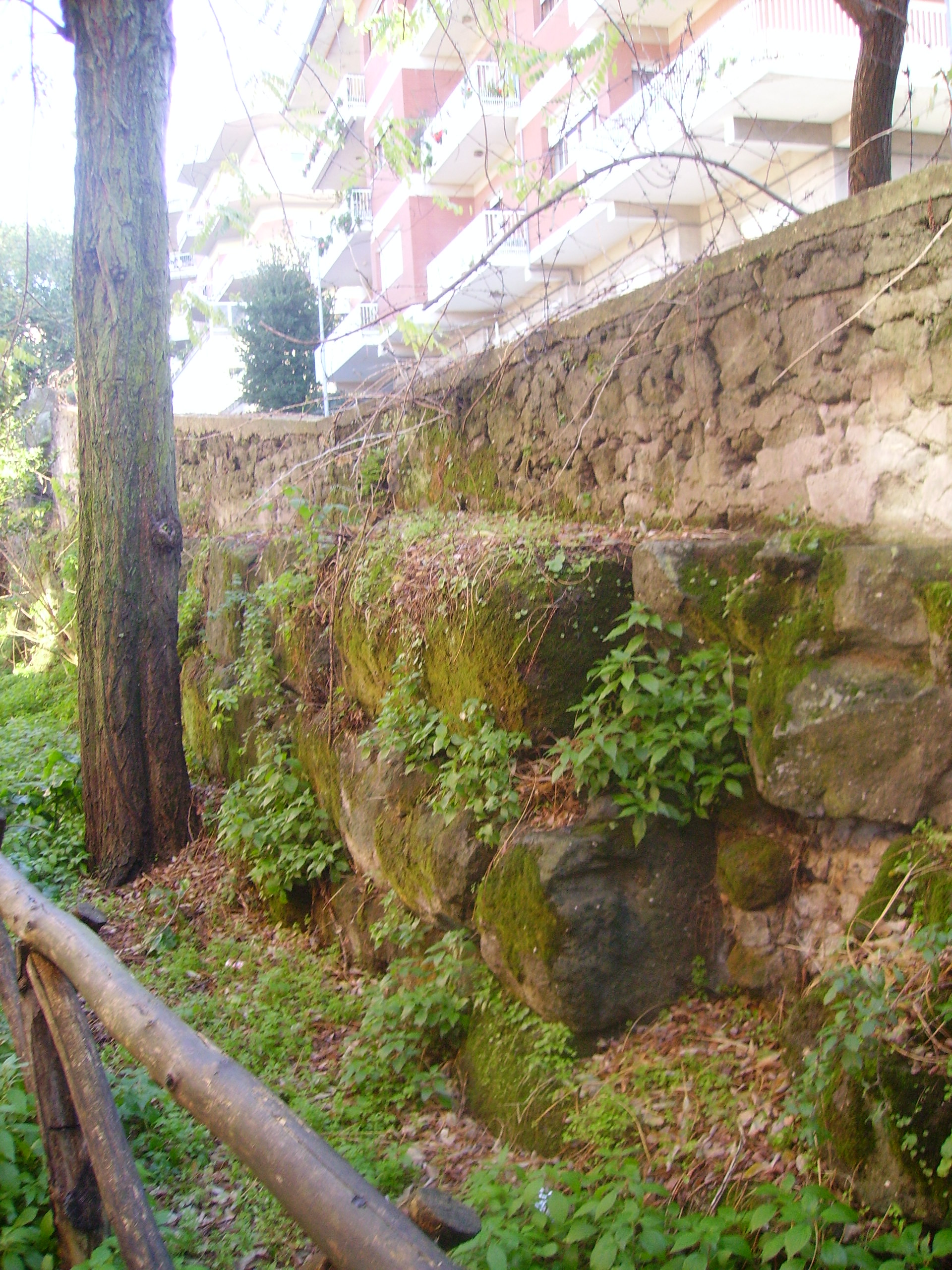
Southeast side

At the end of the northeastern side of the circuit wall, probable traces of a circular turret were found within the building of the Society of the Sacred Heart near San Paolo until the building's complete destruction by Allied aerial bombardment during the Second World War. The circular room inside the convent, described before the war, had a diameter of 3.6 m and was covered by a low dome of very poor workmanship, probably a modern repair.

A well-preserved stretch of about fifty metres serves as the boundary wall between the episcopal seminary and the Missionaries of the Precious Blood, which govern the church of San Paulo. This stretch was built with very great care, because it had to function as the external retaining wall. For this reason it is also very monumental and robust. No trace remains of the porta decumana which must have been around the middle of this stretch and was probably accessed by a staircase of a ramp.

Past the Via San Francesco d'Assisi, on which the Medieval gate of the Cappuchins opened until the second half of the Nineteenth century, the wall follows the Via Tacito, on the property of the Daughters of Immaculate Mary. At the corner of their property, the rounded corner of the ancient wall is still visible, but the circular turret is not, though the need for the wall to bear its weight is reflected in the stronger structure of the wall.

==== Southeast side ====
This is the best preserved side, including the remains of a rectangular guard tower and of the porta principalis sinistra as well as a long stretch of wall, preserved for 142 metres on the Via Castro Partico.

Turning onto the Via Castro Partico sixty metres from the rounded corner, the wall contains a rectangular guard tower, currently put to use as a farmhouse. The internal space measures 5.9 x 3.8 metres and the walls are 0.9 metres thick (except the exterior wall which is inexplicably only 0.6 metres thick). The entrance is still that used in antiquity, facing the inside of the castra and is 1.8 metres wide. The wall then continues on the property of the modern Liceo classico statale Ugo Foscolo and around two hundred metres further on, the remains of the porta principalis sinistra are found - the only one of the two portae principales which can still be seen.

The gate, considered one of the most beautiful remnants of the castra by the archaeologist Giuseppe Lugli, consisted of a single archway 3.8 metres wide. No traces of guard towers have been found on either side.

==== Northwest side ====
The greater part of the wall of this side, after the aforementioned circular tower is buried under modern houses. Presumably, the porta principalis dextra was located on the location of a courtyard off the Via Don Giovanni Minzoni. The wall then proceeded along the line of the facades of the houses on the south side of the modern Via San Gaspare del Bufalo, passing the sixteenth century Trident of the streets, and ending at the modern piazza San Paolo, where some remains were found during some hydraulic work in 1904, arranged in horizontal layers to deal with the steep slope of the terrain. There the wall meets the corner described above in the section on the northeast side.

==== Road network ====
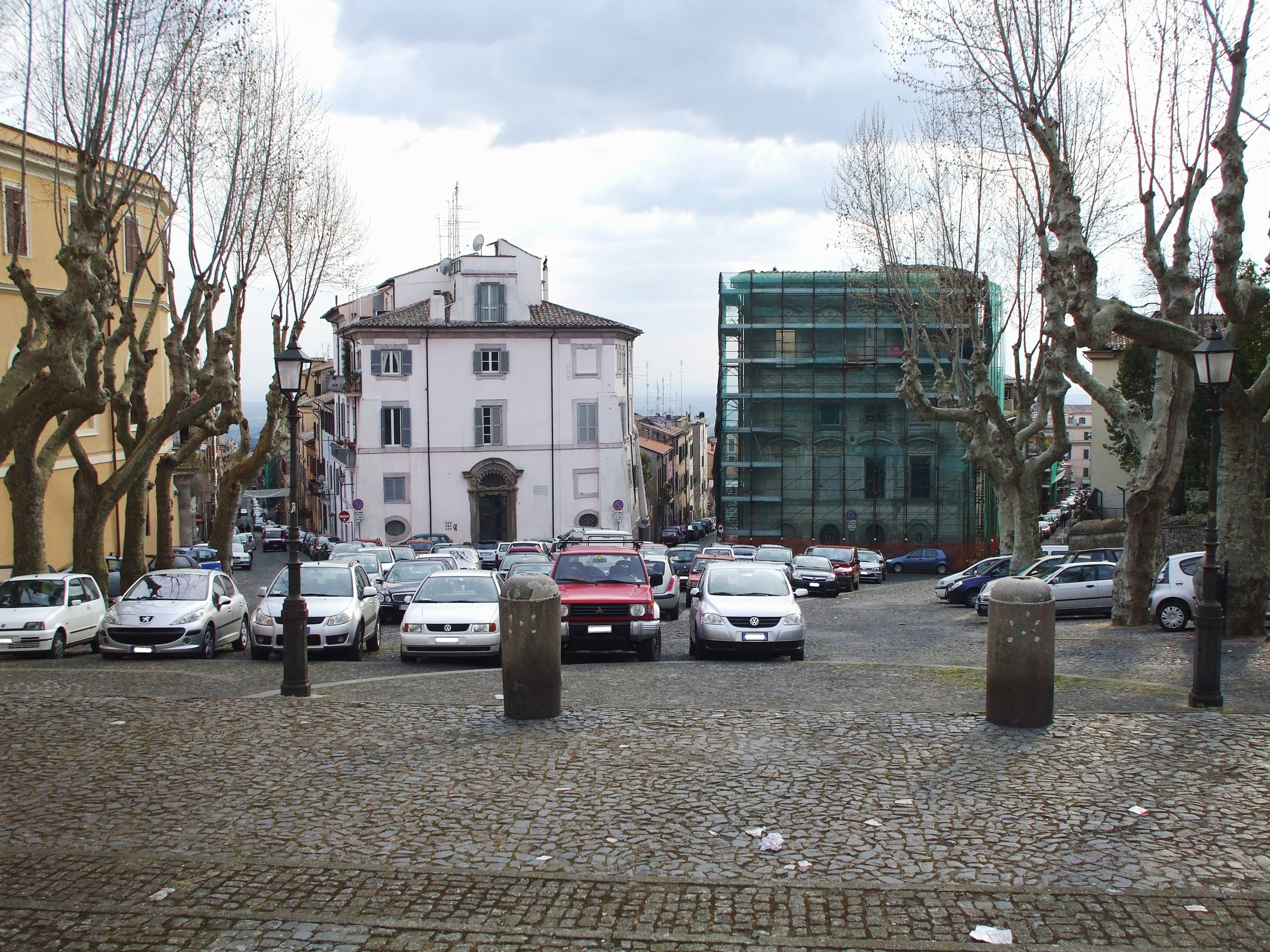
The Trident of streets in Albano at the end of the Piazza San Paolo: The middle street (the Via San Gaspare de Bufalo) is the circumductio, which ran around the walls of the castra.

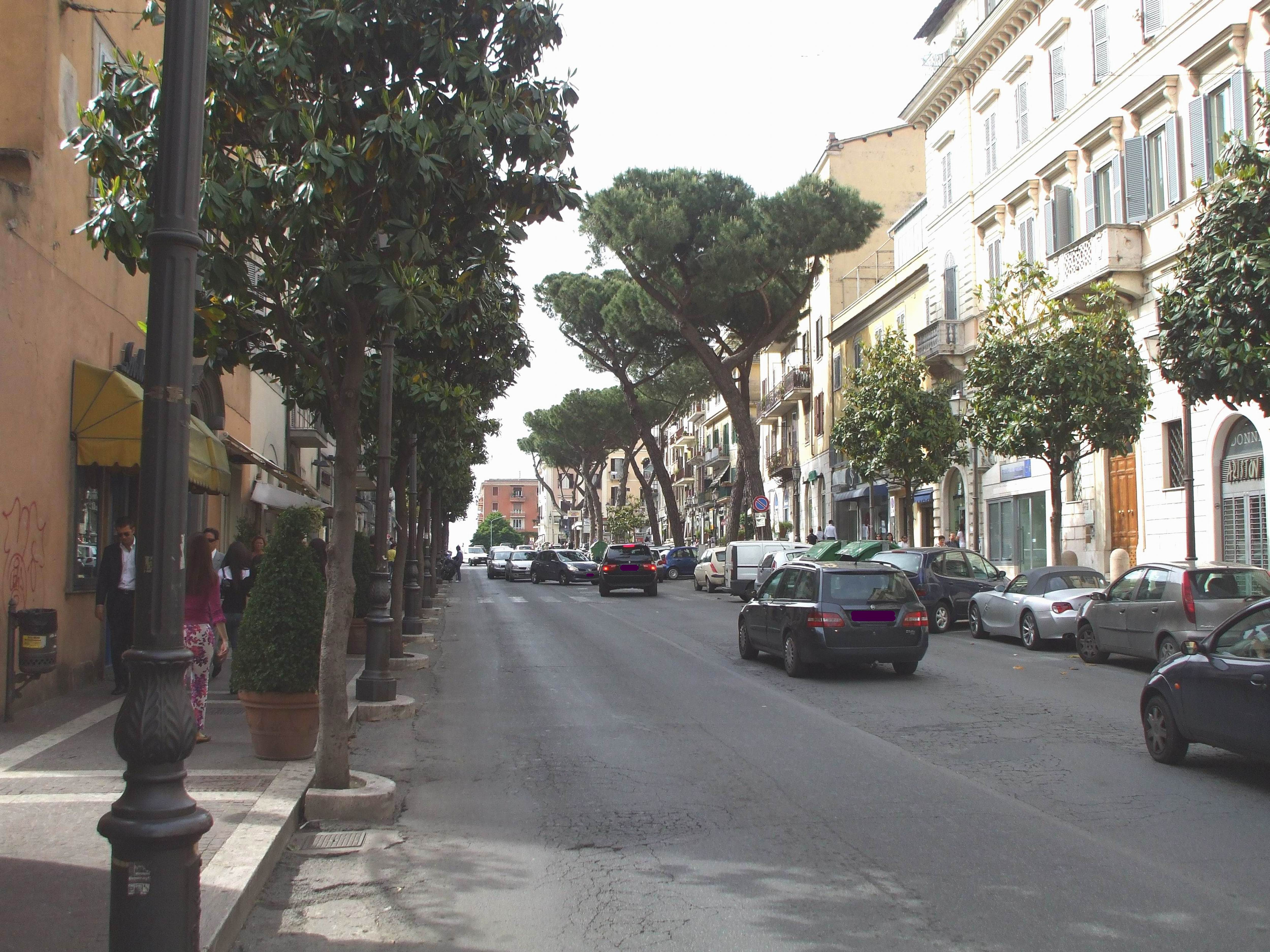
Giacomo Matteotti street, the ancient Appian Way

The road system of a Roman castra consisted of two perpendicular main streets, the via praetoria and the via principalis, with smaller streets running parallel to them. The former ran the whole length of the castra, connecting the porta praetoria with the porta decumana, passing through the praetorium (Headquarters), while the via principalis connected the two portae principales distinguished as sinistra (Left) and dextra (Right).

Stretches of both of these streets have been excavated; only a short stretch of the via praetoria, near the homonymous gate on the modern Alcide De Gasperi Street, while two stretches of the via principalis survive: one near the porta principalis sinistra and the other on San Francesco d'Assisi Street, which was discovered during the archaeological excavations of 1915–1916, 1.1 metres below the modern ground level. This stretch is important because the crepido (sidewalk) facing the gutter was found. In the 1980s excavations carried out by the Museo civico of Albano Laziale and the Ramacci company on the site of a demolished seminary on Castro Pretorio Street discovered the intersection between the via principalis and one of roads running parallel to the via praetoria. This street had been blocked with peperino pilasters in the Medieval period, a sign of the contraction of the inhabited area at the time.

It has also been possible to identify the location of another street within the castra: the via quintana (Fifth Street), which connected the rectangular guard towers. Given the location of one of these towers in Castro Partico Street, the remains of a perpendicular street were found on the part of the via principalis in San Francesco d'Asisi Street, a little past Liceo classico statale Ugo Foscolo.

Remains of the circumductio, the street which encircled the walls on the outside, have been discovered along the north east side under the modern Tacito Street; along the southwest side near the aforementioned rectangular guard tower on Castro Partico Street, 1.5 metres below ground level at a spot 18 metres from the porta principalis sinistra, and a little further along in the public carpark; along the southeast side 0.5 metres below San Pancrazio Street; and along the northwest side in the piazza della Rotonda, on San Gaspare del Bufalo Street and in the piazza San Paolo.

Of the intervallum, the street which ran around the inside of the walls, remains are on the northeast side, as well as a good stretch near the porta praetoria and at the end of Aurelio Saffi Street on the southeast side, and also some on the northwest side.

Outside the castra, under the modern Giacomo Matteotti Road, many remains of the Appian Way have been found. There are also some remains at the end of Risorgimento Ave and Europe Ave.

=== Baths of Caracalla ===
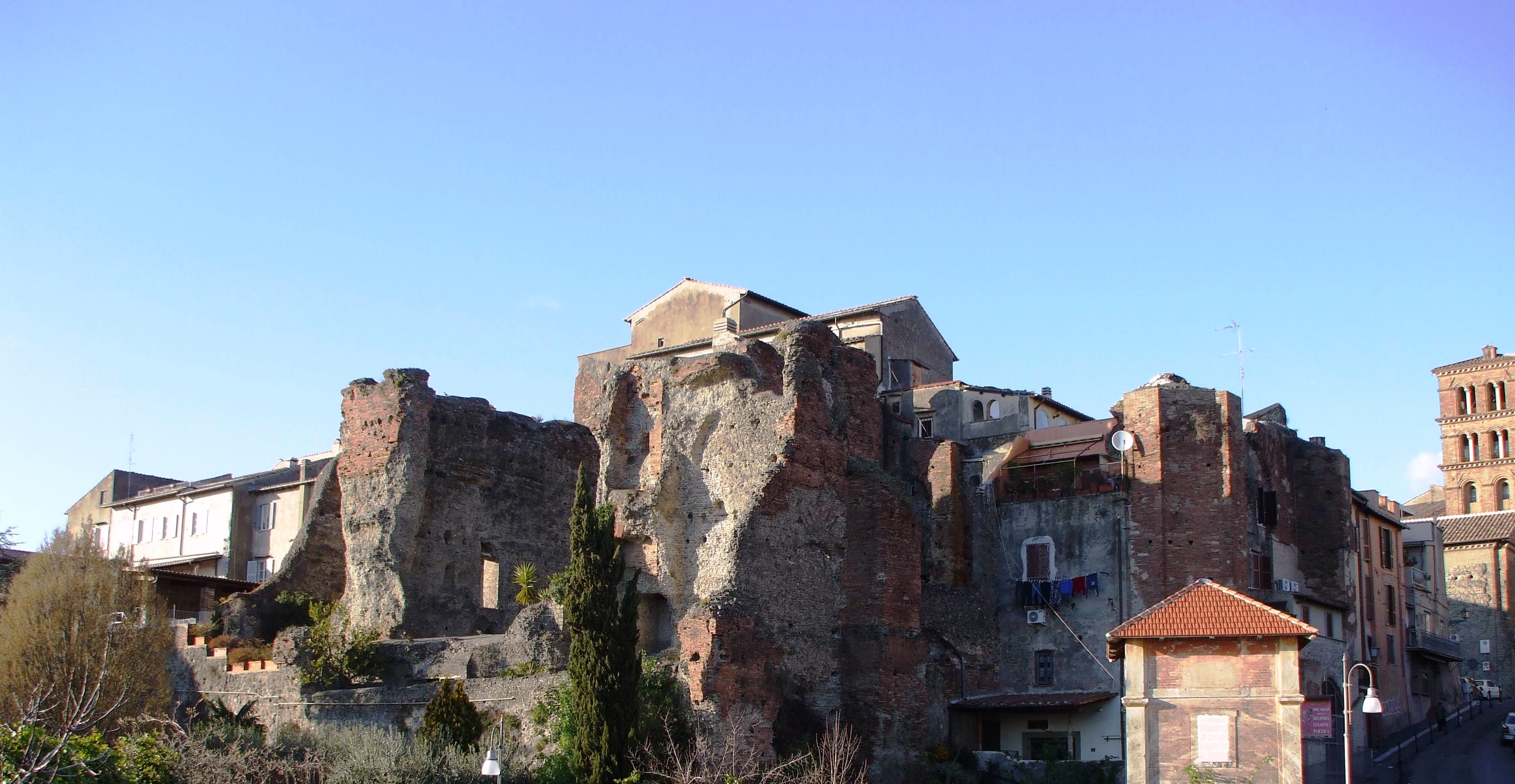
Baths of Caracalla

The Baths of Caracalla are even today the most conspicuous evidence of the castra’s period of greatest splendour, built by Caracalla after the castra and probably for the garrison, but before the amphitheatre. The best conserved part of the baths is a rectangular hall, 37 x 12 metres which is home to the Church of San Pietro.

Underneath the sacristry of the church and near Cellomaio Street, a black and white mosaic floor from the baths was found. Other notable remains were the hypocaust heating system found in the garden of the Sisters of Jesus and Mary.

The building structure is made up of a core of peperino gravel cement, broken up by stretches of brickwork and faced with mattone bricks.

=== Amphitheatre ===
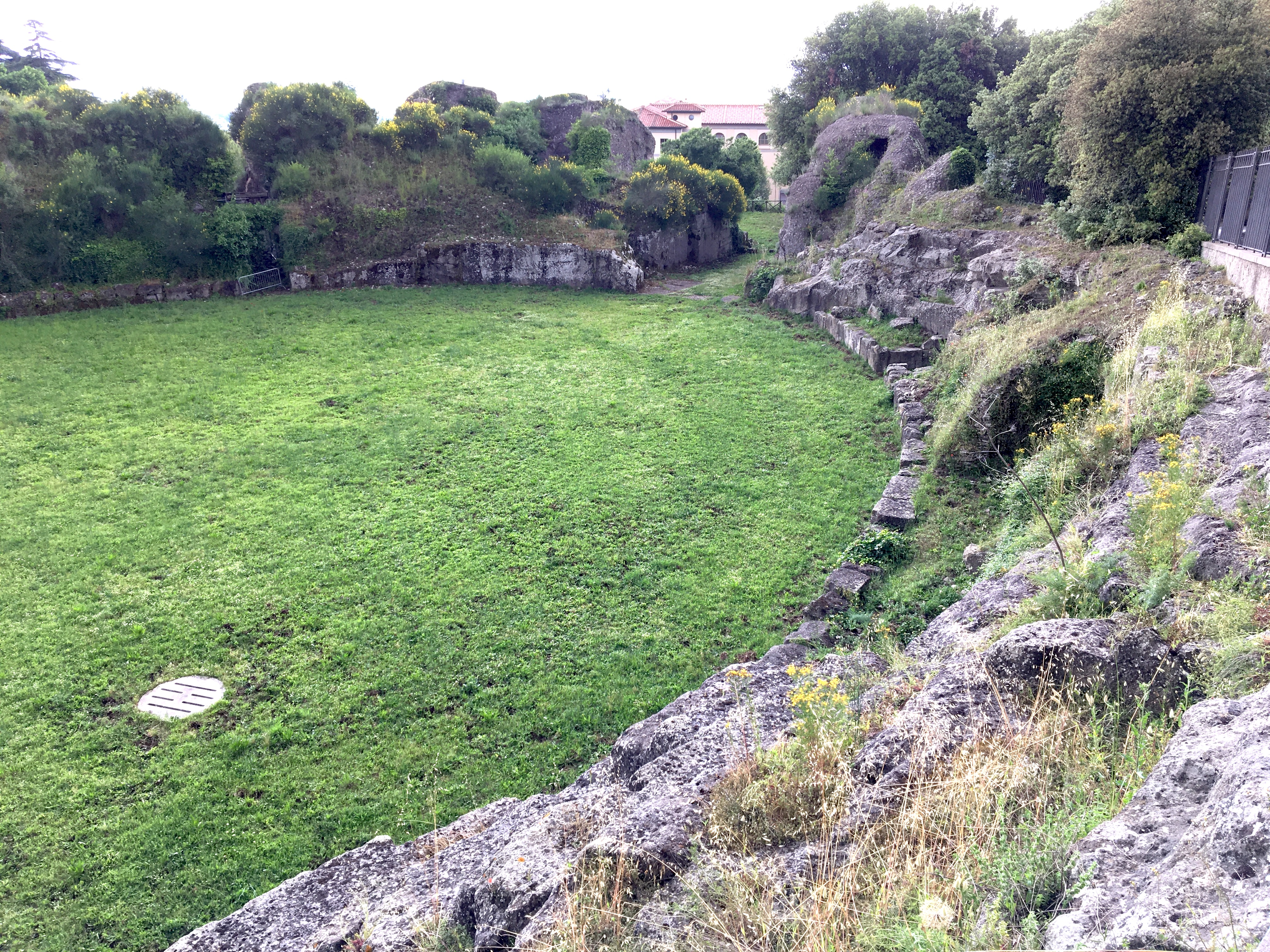
The Amphitheatre

The amphitheatre is one of the most unusual monuments of the castra and dates to the middle of the third century AD, well after the construction of the castra and even of the baths. The building, with a maximum length of 113 metres, could fit 14,850 seats and contain up to 16,000 people. The southern half of the amphitheatre is visible, while the northern part is buried under the retaining walls of San Francesco d'Assisi St and Anfiteatro Romano Street. Among the other remains, partially carved from the living rock and partially built of opus quadratum, are the pulvinar (the Imperial box), some very unusual and "bizarre" substructural archways, and vomitoria (access corridors).

Remains have been found of a paved street which probably followed the course of the modernday Anfiteatro Romano Street to link up with the Appian Way and followed the modern "galleria di sopra" in the other direction to the Villa of Domitian.

=== Other buildings ===
==== The Rotunda ====
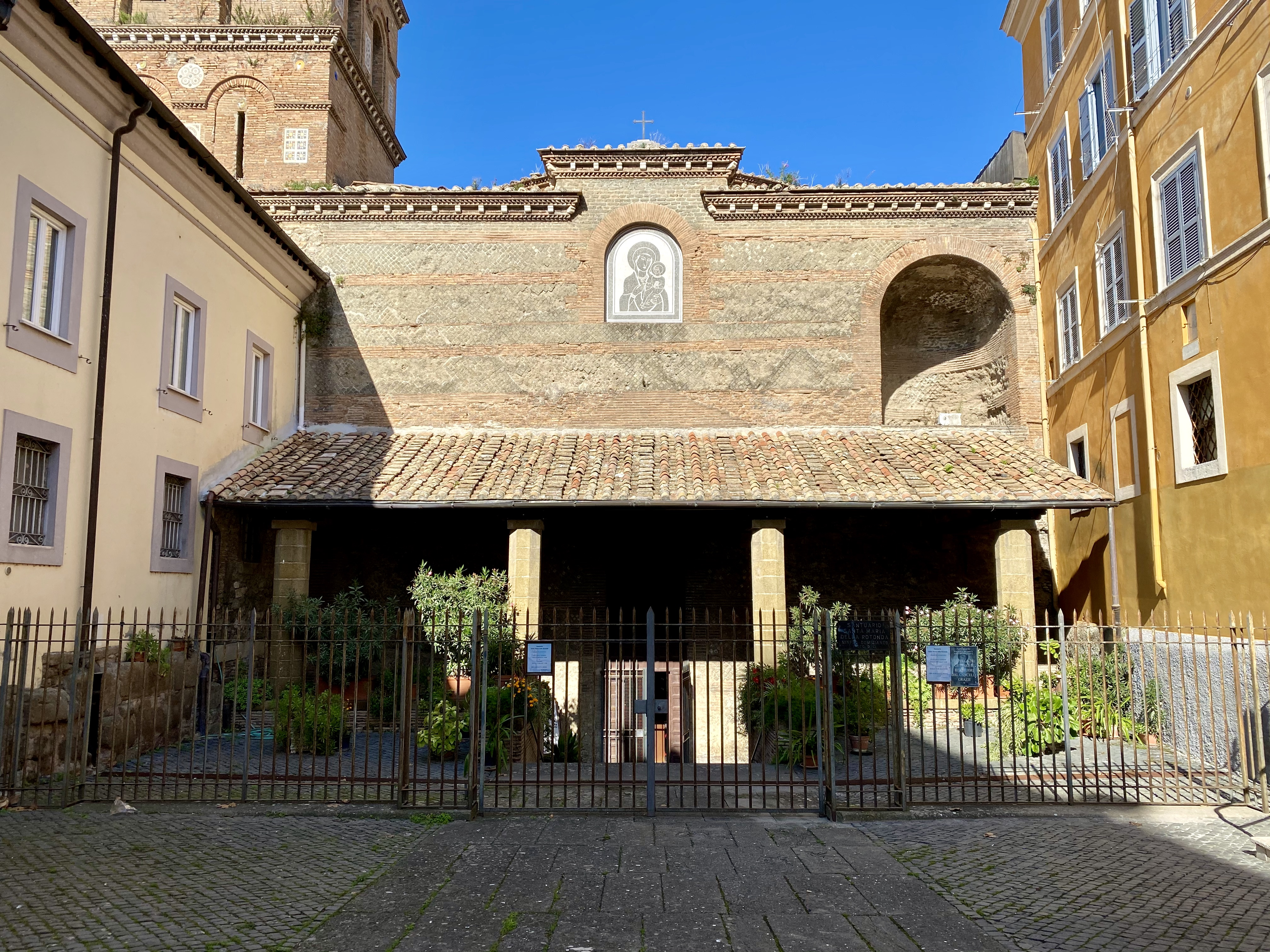
Facade of Santuario di Santa Maria della Rotonda

The Santa Maria della Rotonda is the best preserved Roman structure in Albano. The circular interior has a circumference of 49.1 m and mimicks the Pantheon in Rome on a reduced scale. It was probably a nymphaeum of the Villa of Domitian. Later it was restored and incorporated into the Severan complex and used as a public baths or cult site. The first theory would explain the paviment of white and black mosaic tesserae with mythological figures, today located in the portico of the church. The second theory is supported by a peperino pagan altar and by some tombs found during archaeological excavations in 1935–38. After the Severan period, the structure was used as a granary or cult building, before conversion to a Christian building around the eighth century.

==== The "thermae parvae" ====
Some individual ruins in the ground near the piazza della Rotonda and Don Giovanni Minzoni Street have been called "thermae parvae" (Small Baths) in some reconstructions of the castra, to distinguish them from the "thermae magnae" (Large Baths), the Baths of Caracalla. These remains are under some houses on Don Giovanni Minzoni Street and are made up of two corridors, about a metre deep, one 2.70 metres long and the other 3.29 metres, with a series of niches along the walls. The construction was entirely carried out in opus reticulatum using peperino in the Severan period - it was the last building to use this technique in the Ager Romanus. These corridors are probably the cryptoportici of the bath, connected to other bathing rooms located in Piazza della Rotonda, near the modern Palazzo Vescovile.

==== Barracks ====
Some terraces, probably part of a barracks, have been found in the retentura (the part of the castra located between the praetorium and the porta decumana), inside the property of the episcopal seminary and the property of the Daughters of Immaculate Mary on San Fracesco d'Assisi Street. These ruins consist of five walls of the substructure arranged on different levels. On the second level, traces of a partition wall were found, which created rooms about 6 metres wide.

During the archaeological excavations of 1915–1916, they found walls of 4.5 x 4.5 metre rooms in various constructive techniques on top of older walls dating back to the 1st century BC, all along San Francesco d'Assisi Street from the rectangular tower to the porta principalis sinistra.

Parallel walls were found in 1914 near the northwest side, in the Piazza della Rotonda. They are not aligned with the grid of the castra and a bulla from the time of Hadrian, which suggests that these buildings predated the castra and were razed to the ground during its construction. "An intricate pattern of walls" was found under the Piazza della Rotonda, where the excavators of 1915-1916 found the remains of the rooms mixed with blocks of peperino fallen from the nearby wall of the northwest side. Other rooms were identified in the Piazza San Paolo from the same period. In general, the lodgings were built in opus latericium, interspersed with blocks of peperino from the end of the second century. In the 1980s, further remains of lodgings were identified, as well as a building with a portico on Castro Pretorio Street.

==== "The Cisternoni" ====
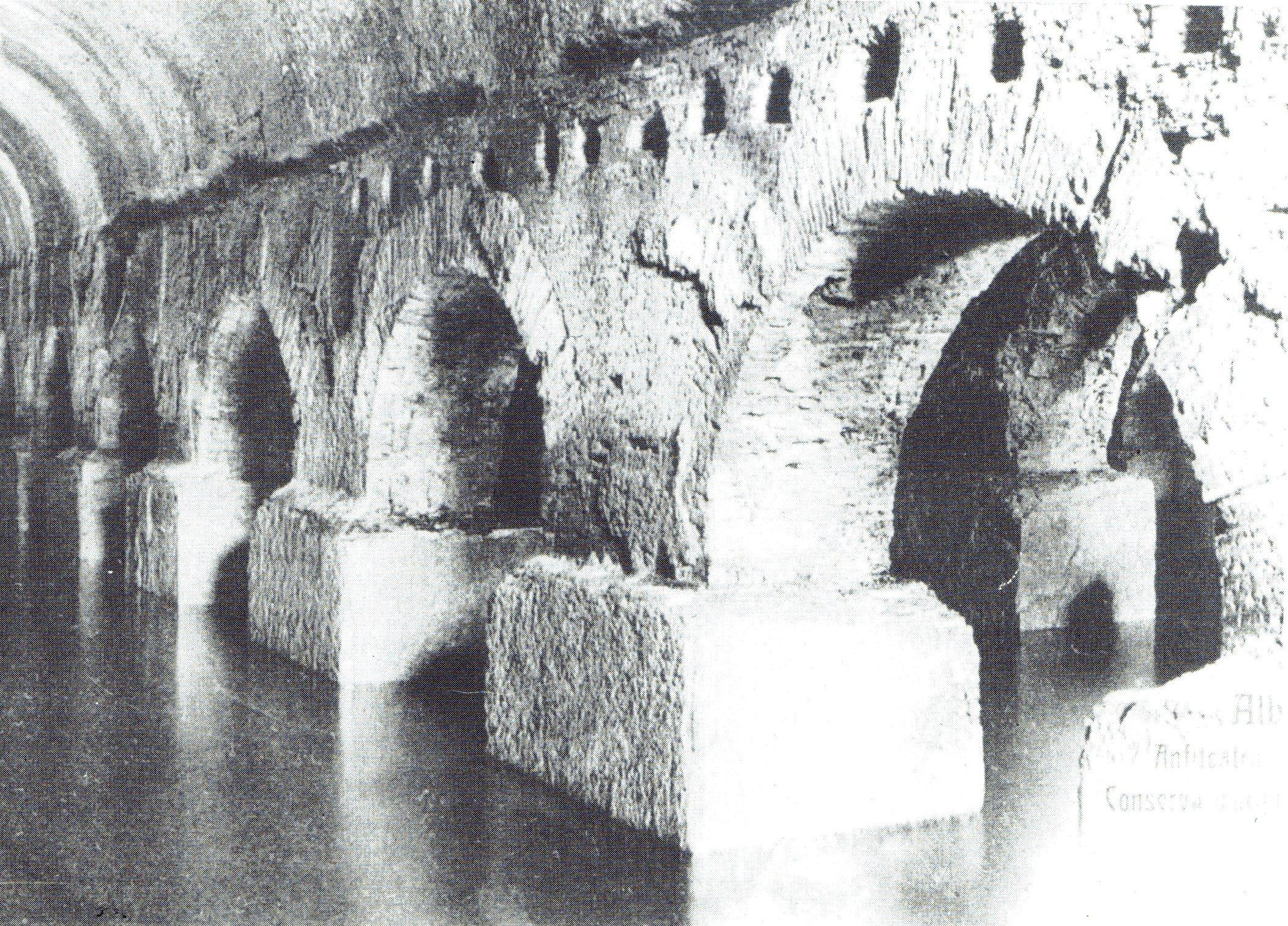
"The cisterns" in a postcard photographed before their abandonment in 1912.

The very large cistern of the castra is found under the property of the episcopal seminary, with access from the piazza San Paolo and San Francesco d'Assisi Street. It is known to the Albanese as the Cisternoni (giant cisterns). The long sides measure 45.50 and 47.90 metres, while the short sides are 29.62 and 31.90 metres long, for a surface area of 1436.50 square metres and a capacity of 10,132 cubic metres of water. The structure, with five aisles, was carved into the bedrock as far as possible to a depth of between three and four metres; the height of the vaults is around 6.5 metres, with significant variation. On account of some ornamental elements discovered in 1830 and 1884 it is believed that at least the front of the monumental structure was ornate. Until the 1920s only a single supply tunnel of the cistern was known, which is located on the northeastern side. But the archaeologist Giuseppe Lugli discovered a second, more ancient tunnel on the same side, which served the cistern through a complex system until it broke. The water came to the Cisternoni from the Malafitto and Palazzolo springs, near Lake Albano. The cistern was still used by the Comune of Albano in 1884, but for hygiene reasons it was restricted to use for irrigation in 1912.

==== Other cisterns, drains, and sewers ====
One particular cistern of an elongated shape (around 30 metres long and 4.16 metres wide) with a barrel vault was discovered under Aurelio Saffi Street. It was probably part of a larger. A stretch of the supply tunnel of the cistern survives as well, pointing to the northeast.

The sewage network of the castra must have been extensive and would have followed the slope of the hill, discharging into the main sewer running under the intervallum in Alcide De Gasperi Street. The first stretch of this main sewer, 0.9 m wide, was discovered in 1915–6 at the intersection of Alcide De Gasperi Street and San Francesco d'Assisi Street.

=== Necropolis of Selvotta ===
The first discoveries near Selvotta, a place on the borders between Albano Laziale and Ariccia, were made in 1866 by a farmer called Lorenzo Fortunato and were analysed by the young Russian archaeologist Nicola Wendt. The German archaeologist Wilhelm Henzen was the first to suggest that the frequent references to the Legio II Parthica found in the inscriptions discovered at Selvotta would have to indicate a necropolis of the legion, located a short distance from the castra. A campaign of excavation and surveying in the area was carried out by Henzen, Hermann Dessau, and Rodolfo Lanciani at the end of the nineteenth century. Further campaigns were carried out by Giuseppe Lugli in 1908, 1910, 1913, 1945, and 1960-2 and by Maria Marchetti Longhi in 1916.

In the 1960s about fifty tombs were discovered, of which two thirds had mortuary inscriptions. All were made in the same way, with the graves dug into the living rock and covered by a monolithic block of peperino in the form of a roof or a lid. In the excavations of 1960-2 two unusual graves were found: a cippus grave with a broken column, characteristic of eastern tombs and a tomb with a cremation - the only one in the necropolis. Wives and children were buried alongside the soldiers and there was no order to the arrangement of the tombs, although they were often grouped together. From analysis of the grave inscriptions it is clear that the greater part of the soldiers bore the praenomen Aurelius and therefore it is deduced that they served in the time of the legion's greatest prosperity, during the reigns of Caracalla (211-217) and Elagabalus (218-222). The women, on the other hand, have Italic names.

=== Epigraphic documentation ===
There is little epigraphic testimony of the Legio II Parthica and a large amount of what there is was discovered around the necropolis in Selvotta. This large concentration of inscriptions (CIL XIV, 3367, CIL XIV, 3368, CIL XIV, 3369, CIL XIV, 3370, CIL XIV, 3371, CIL XIV, 3372, CIL XIV, 3373, CIL XIV, 3374, CIL XIV, 3375, CIL XIV, 3376, CIL XIV, 3377, CIL XIV, 3400 and many others) permitted archaeologists from Wilhelm Henzen onwards to identify Castra Albana with the modern Albano Laziale for certain.

Among the inscriptions referring to the legion and the castra, the most notable is CIL XIV, 2255, while CIL XIV, 2257 is a prediction of the "eternal victory" of Elagabalus, in which the legion is called "Antoniana" after the full name of the reigning emperior. The same phenomenon is seen also in the reign of Septimius Severus or Alexander Severus, when the legion was called "Severiana" (CIL XIV, 2274, CIL XIV, 2276, CIL XIV, 2285, CIL XIV, 2290, CIL XIV, 2291, CIL XIV, 2293, CIL XIV, 2294, CIL XIV, 2296), and under Philip the Arab when the legion was called "Philippiana" (CIL XIV, 2258).

In CIL XIV, 2255 a temple consecrated to Minerva is mentioned and a shrine to Jupiter appears in CIL XIV, 2253 and CIL XIV, 2254, while there is an altar dedicated to the Sun and the Moon in CIL XIV, 2256. The last epigraphic evidence regarding the Legio II Parthica at Albano is a series of little terracotta bricks which report the names of fome legionaries (CIL XIV, 2267, CIL XIV, 2268, CIL XIV, 2293) - the oldest of these dates to 226, the latest was reused in the foundations of Albano Cathedral in the reign of Constantine.

Only three mentions of the Legio II Parthica have been found in Italia outside of the area of Albano. The first of these is a tile dedicated by the legion to the goddess (CIL XIV, 4090), which was found near the temple of Diana Aricina on Lake Nemi, in the nearby community of Nemi in 1884. The other two (CIL V, 865, CIL V, 866) were found near Aquileia in the Regio X Venetia et Histria. In the east, inscriptions relating to the legion are found in Mesopotamia and Syria.
