= Albano Cathedral =

Cathedral in Albano Laziale, Italy

- Cattedrale di San Pancrazio
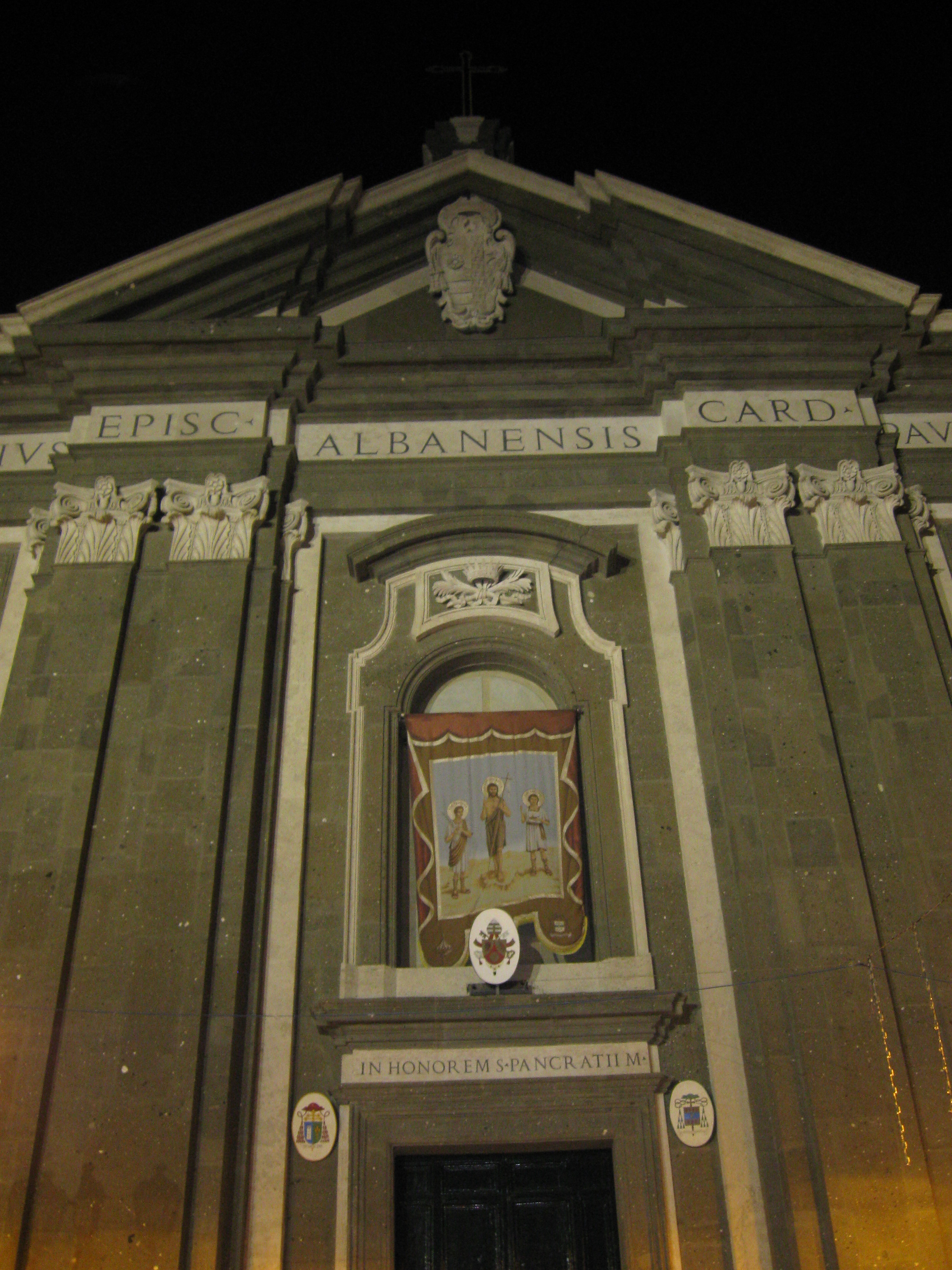
- Albano Cathedral
- 41.73068°N 12.65758°E
- Country: Italy
- Denomination: Catholic Church

History
- Dedication: Saint Pancras
- Consecrated: 1721

Administration
- Diocese: Suburbicarian Diocese of Albano

Clergy
- Bishop(s): Luis Antonio Tagle (cardinal-bishop); Vincenzo Viva (diocesan)

Albano Cathedral (Italian: Duomo di Albano, Cattedrale di San Pancrazio) is a Roman Catholic cathedral in the city of Albano Laziale, in the province of Rome and the region of Lazio, Italy. It is the seat of the Suburbicarian Diocese of Albano.

The present cathedral building was consecrated in 1721, but stands on the site of a much older basilica, dedicated to Saint John the Baptist, founded by Constantine the Great. Pope Leo III (died 816) built a new cathedral on the site and changed the dedication to Saint Pancras, as it now is.

== Gallery ==
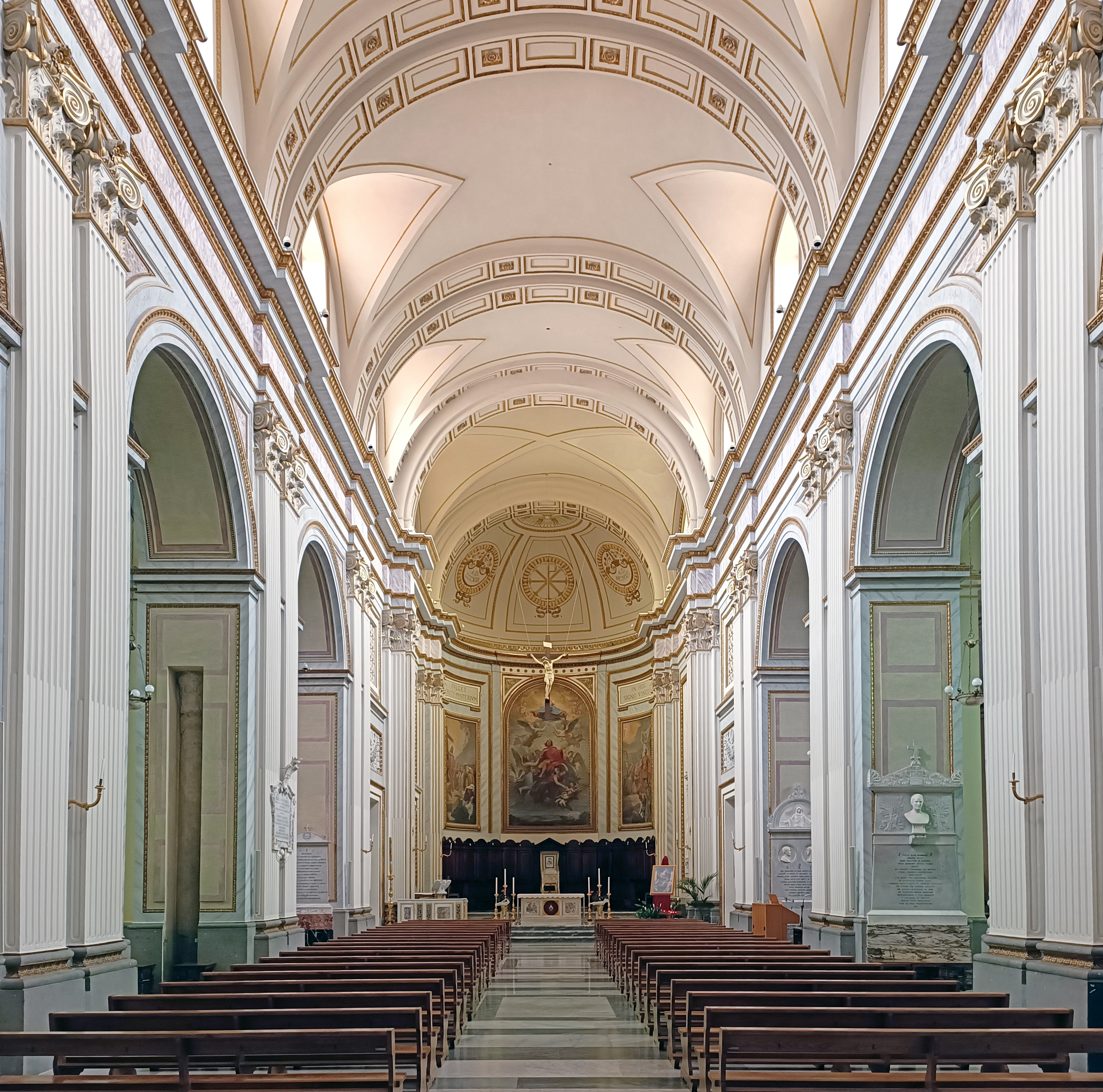
Nave facing the chancel

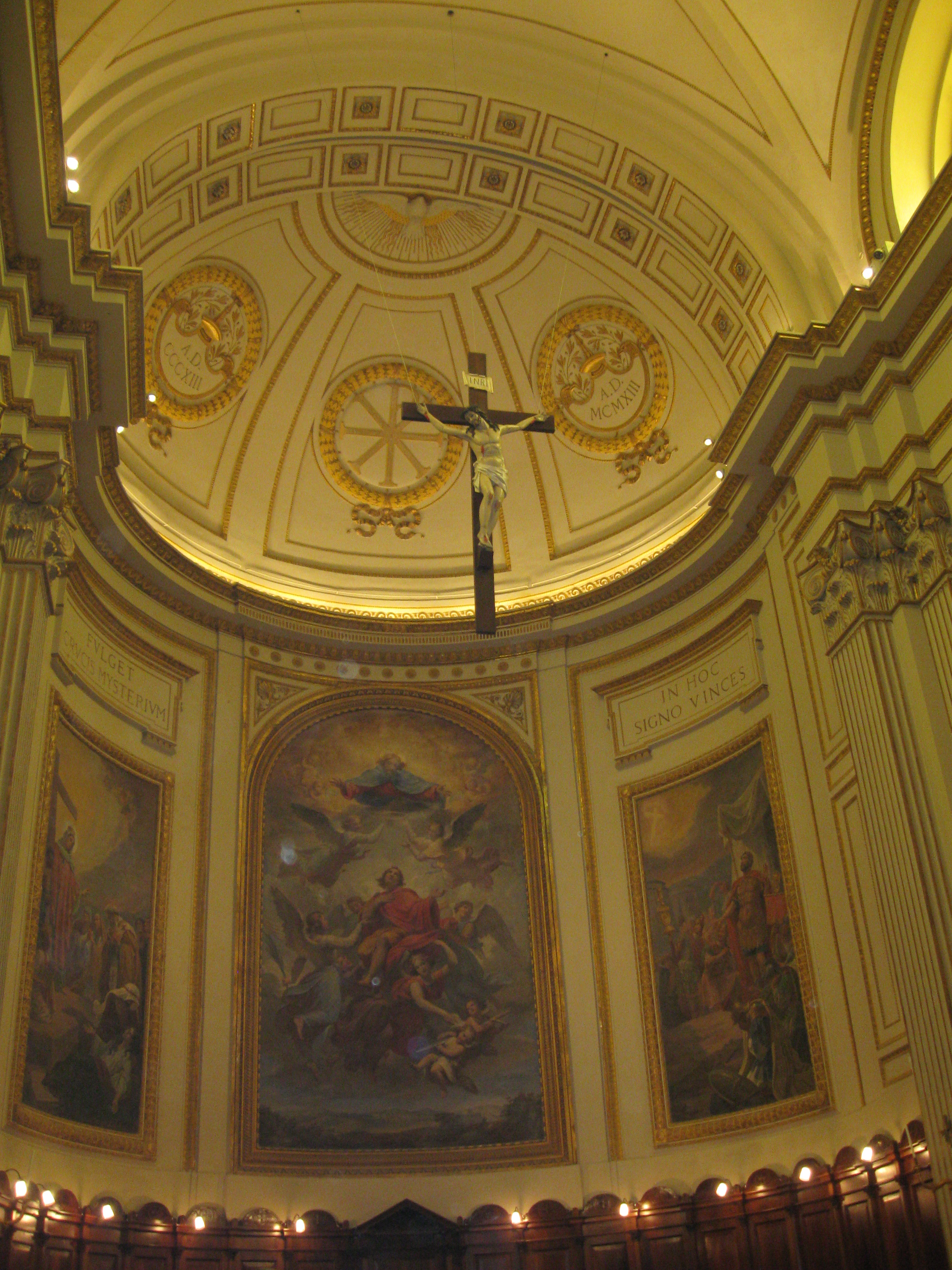
Apse decoration
