= Peperino =

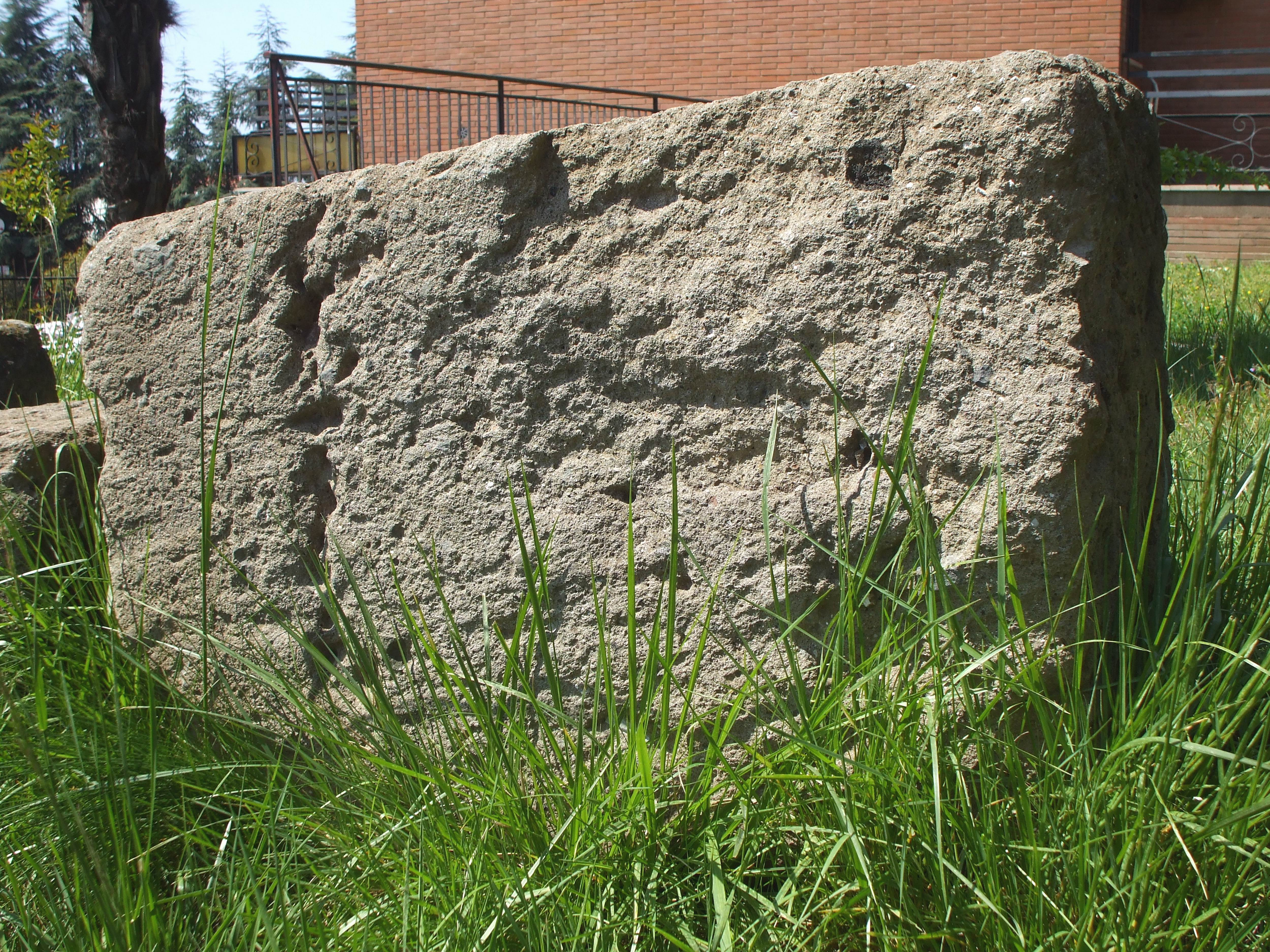
An ashlar block of peperino dating from Roman times

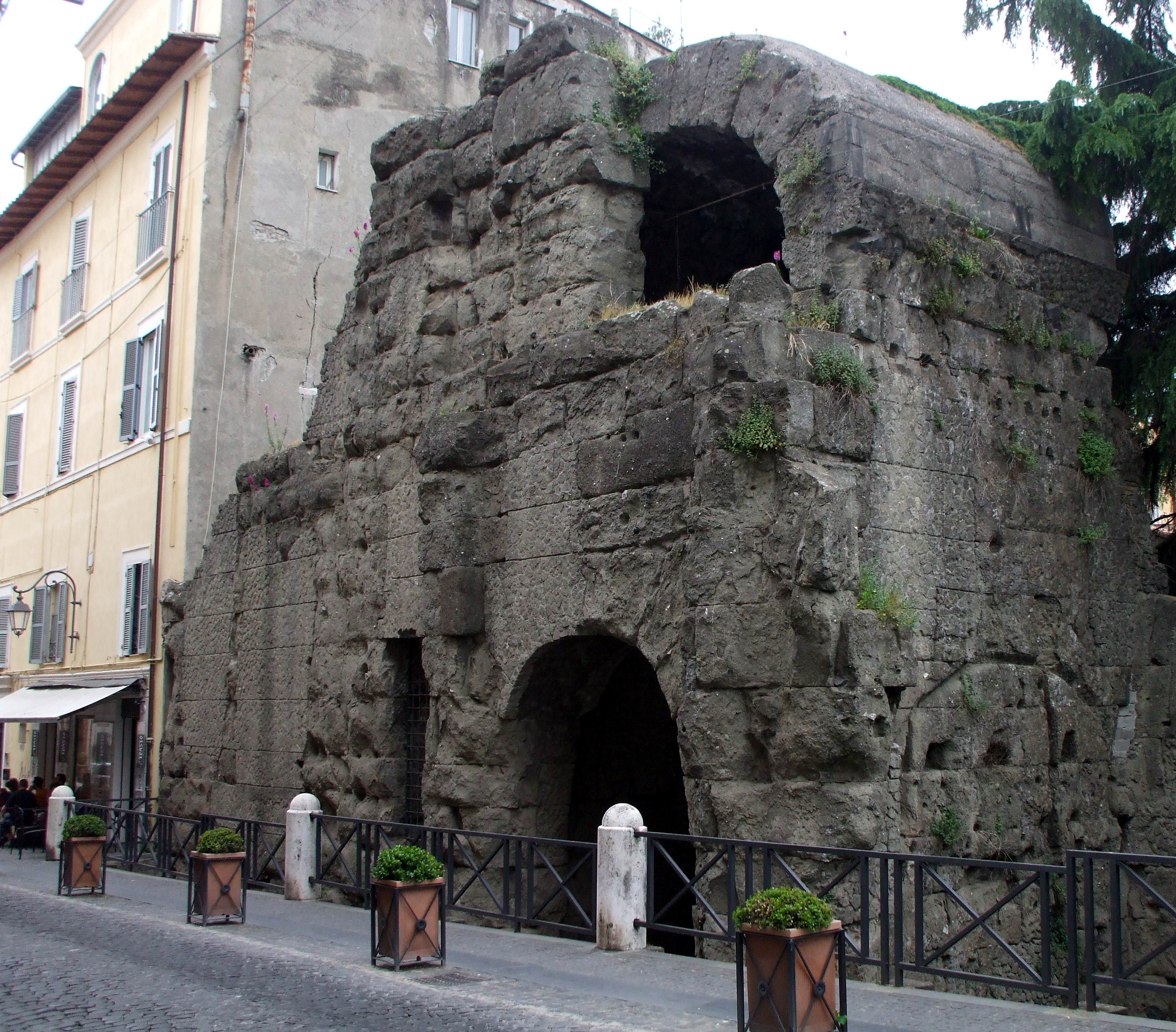
The Porta Pretoria in Albano Laziale, Italy. A clear example of the durability and grey surface of peperino.

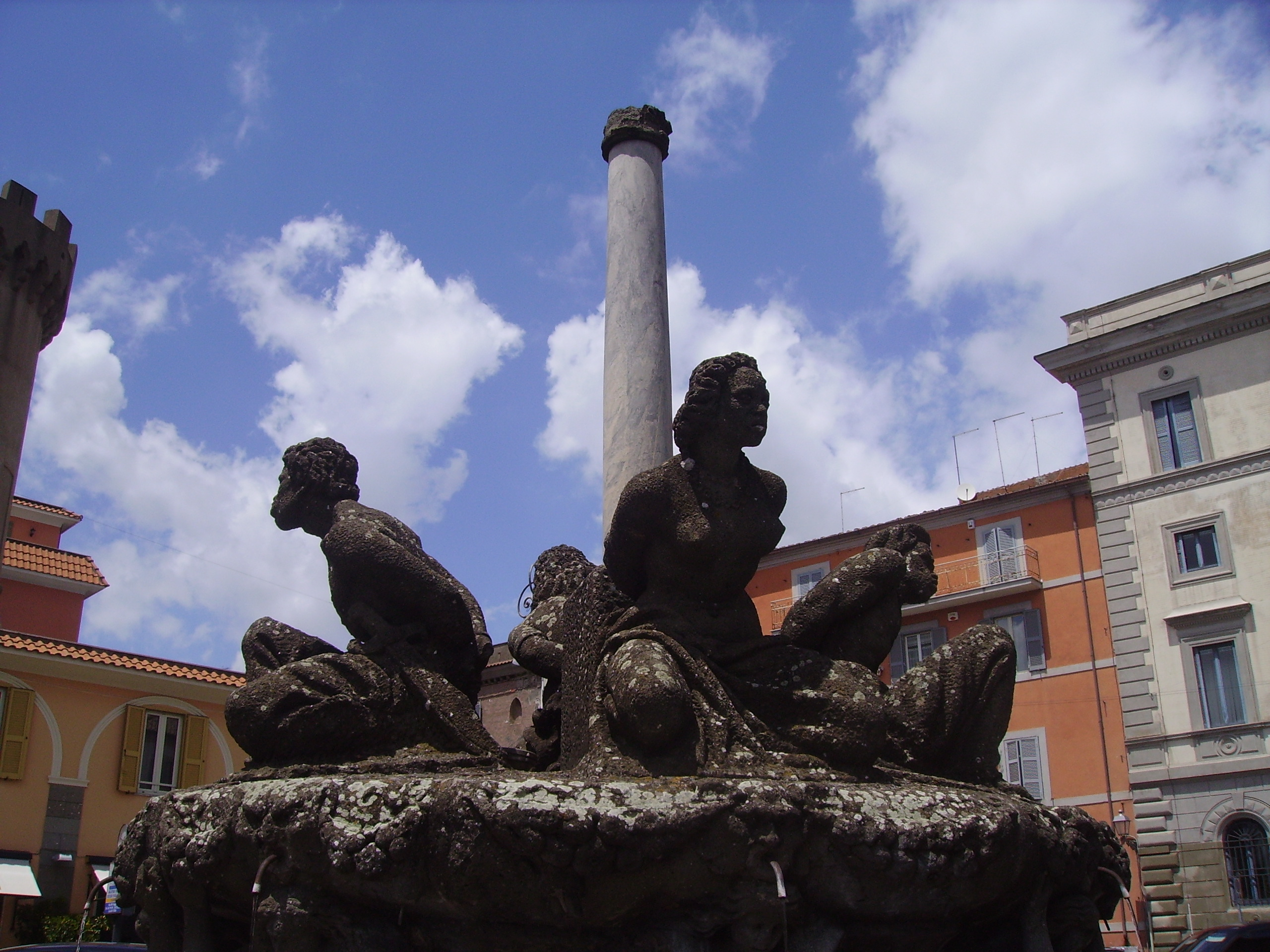
A fountain sculpted from peperino, in Marino, Italy

Peperino is an Italian word describing a brown or grey volcanic tuff, containing fragments of basalt and limestone, with disseminated crystals of augite, mica, magnetite, leucite, and other similar minerals. The name originally referred to the dark-colored inclusions, suggestive of peppercorns.

The typical peperino occurs in the Alban Hills and in Soriano nel Cimino, near Rome, and was used by the ancient Romans under the name of lapis albanus as a building stone and for the basins of fountains.

Other tuffs and conglomerates in Auvergne and elsewhere are also called peperino. In English the word has sometimes been written "peperine".

Lazian peperino is a cousin to piperno tuff from Campania.
