= Castel Savelli =

Castle in Lazio, Italy

Castel Savello
- Albano Laziale in Italy
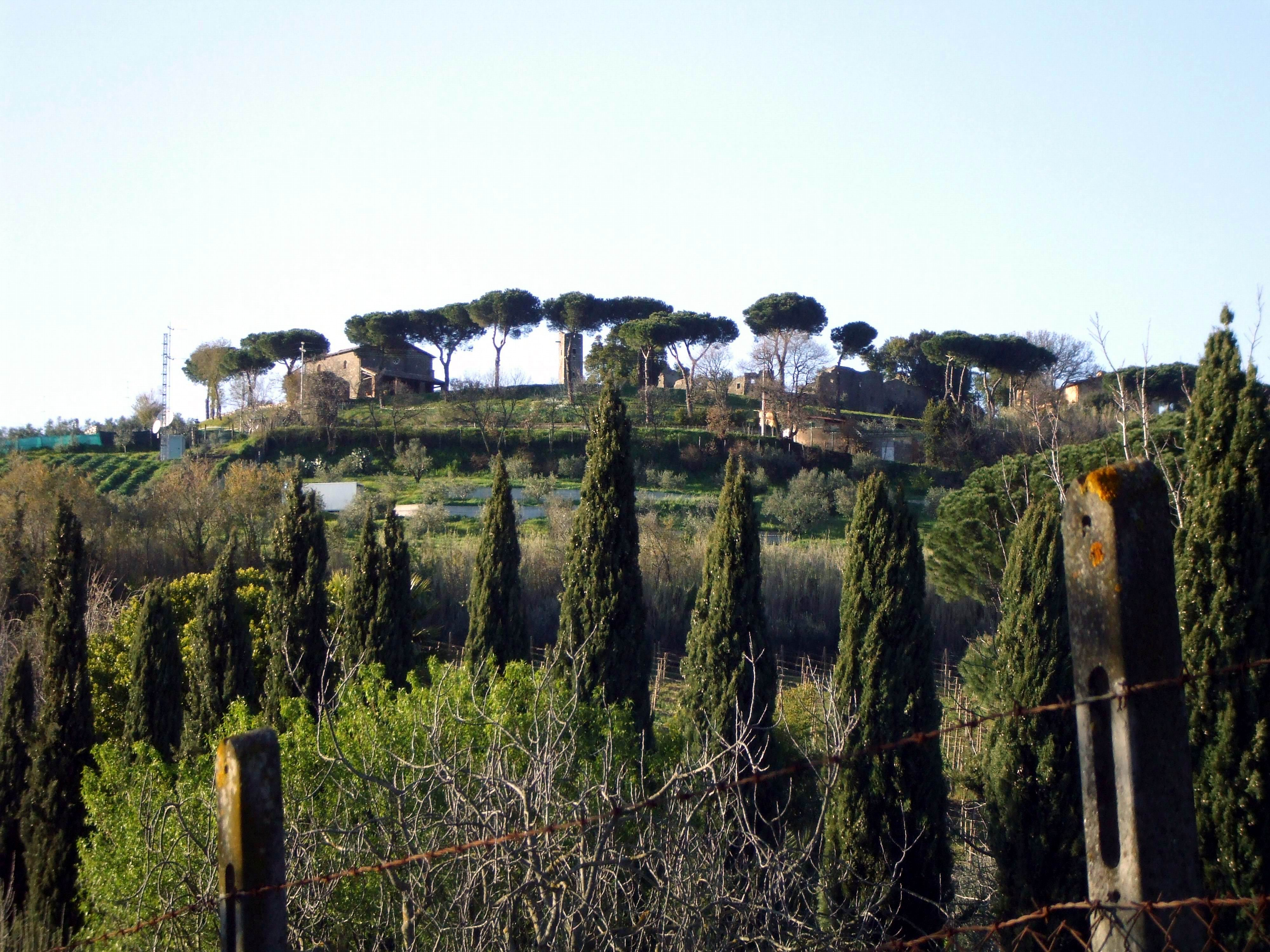
- Monte Savello with the ruins of Castel Savello

Location
- Location of Castel Savello
- Coordinates: 41°43′24″N 12°38′18″E

Site history
- Built: 13th century

Castel Savelli (also Castel Savello) was a castle near Albano Laziale, in the Lazio region of central Italy. The Savelli family had owned the estate since the 1160s, and build the castle during the papal reign of Pope Honorius III (1216–1227) and Pope Honorius IV (1285–1287). The castle was razed by the forces of cardinal Giovanni Vitelleschi in 1435, and never rebuilt.
