= Albano Laziale =

Albano Laziale Arbano
- Comune
- Città di Albano Laziale
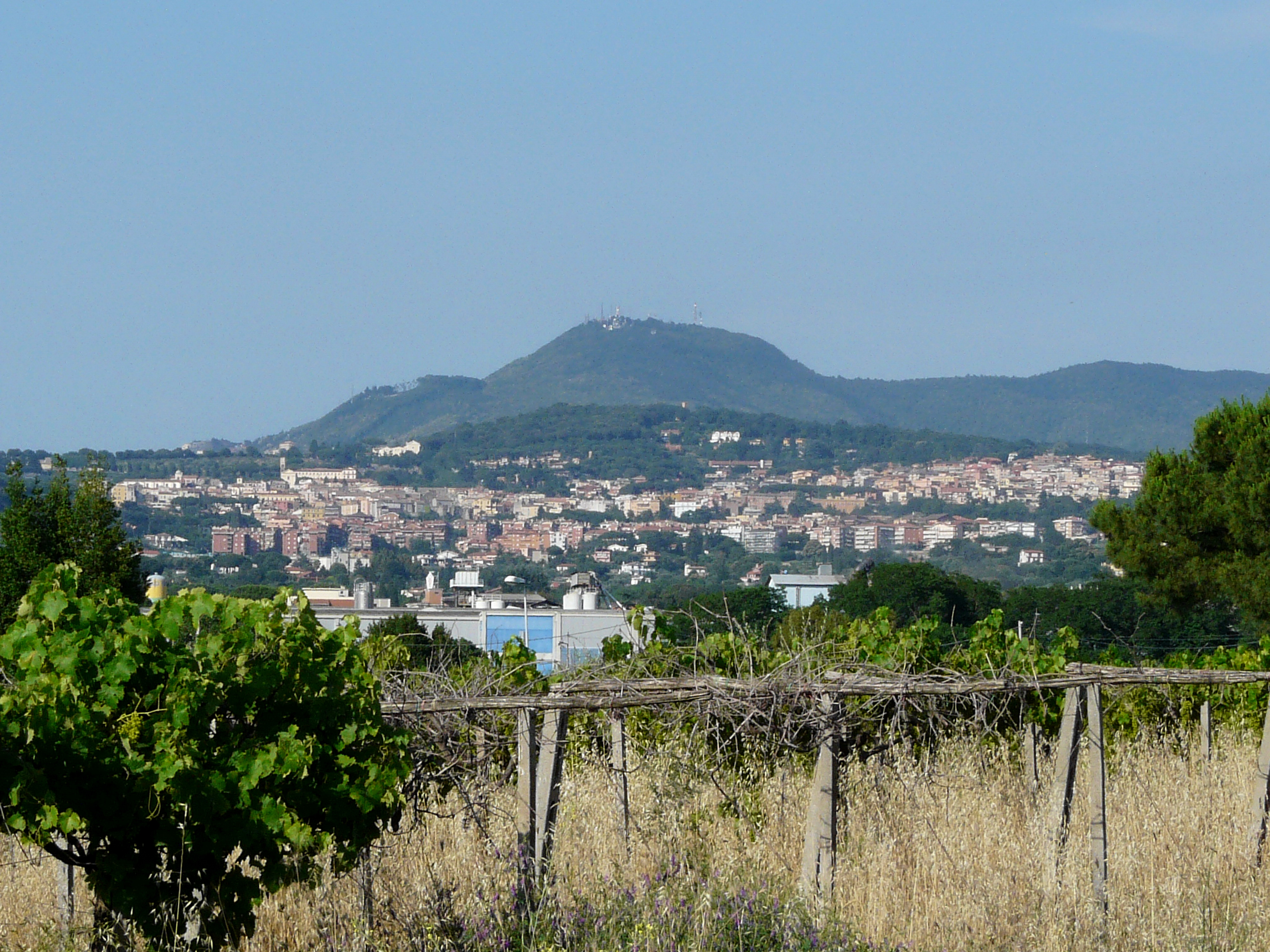
- View of Albano Laziale

- Flag Coat of arms

- Location of Albano Laziale in Italy Albano Laziale (Lazio)
- Coordinates: 41°44′N 12°40′E
- Country: Italy
- Region: Lazio
- Metropolitan city: Rome (RM)
- Frazioni: Cecchina, Pavona

Government
  - Mayor: Massimiliano Borelli (Democratic Party)

Area
  - Total: 23.80 km^{2} (9.19 sq mi)
- Elevation: 400 m (1,300 ft)

Population (30 April 2017)
  - Total: 41,598
  - Density: 1,748/km^{2} (4,527/sq mi)
- Demonym: Albanensi
- Time zone: UTC+1 (CET)
  - Summer (DST): UTC+2 (CEST)
- Postal code: 00041
- Dialing code: 06
- Patron saint: St. Pancras
- Saint day: May 12
- Website: Official website

Albano Laziale (Italian: [alˈbaːno latˈtsjaːle]), sometimes known simply as Albano (Romanesco: Arbano; Latin: Albanum), is a comune (municipality) in the Metropolitan City of Rome Capital, on the Alban Hills, in the Italian region of Lazio. Rome is 25 kilometres (16 mi) distant. It is bounded by other communes of Castel Gandolfo, Rocca di Papa, Ariccia and Ardea.

Partially included in the Roman Castles Regional Park, Albano is one of its most important municipalities, and a busy commercial centre. It has been also a suburbicarian bishopric since the 5th century, a historic principality of the Savelli family, and from 1699 to 1798 the inalienable possession of the Holy See.

== Geography ==
=== Territory ===
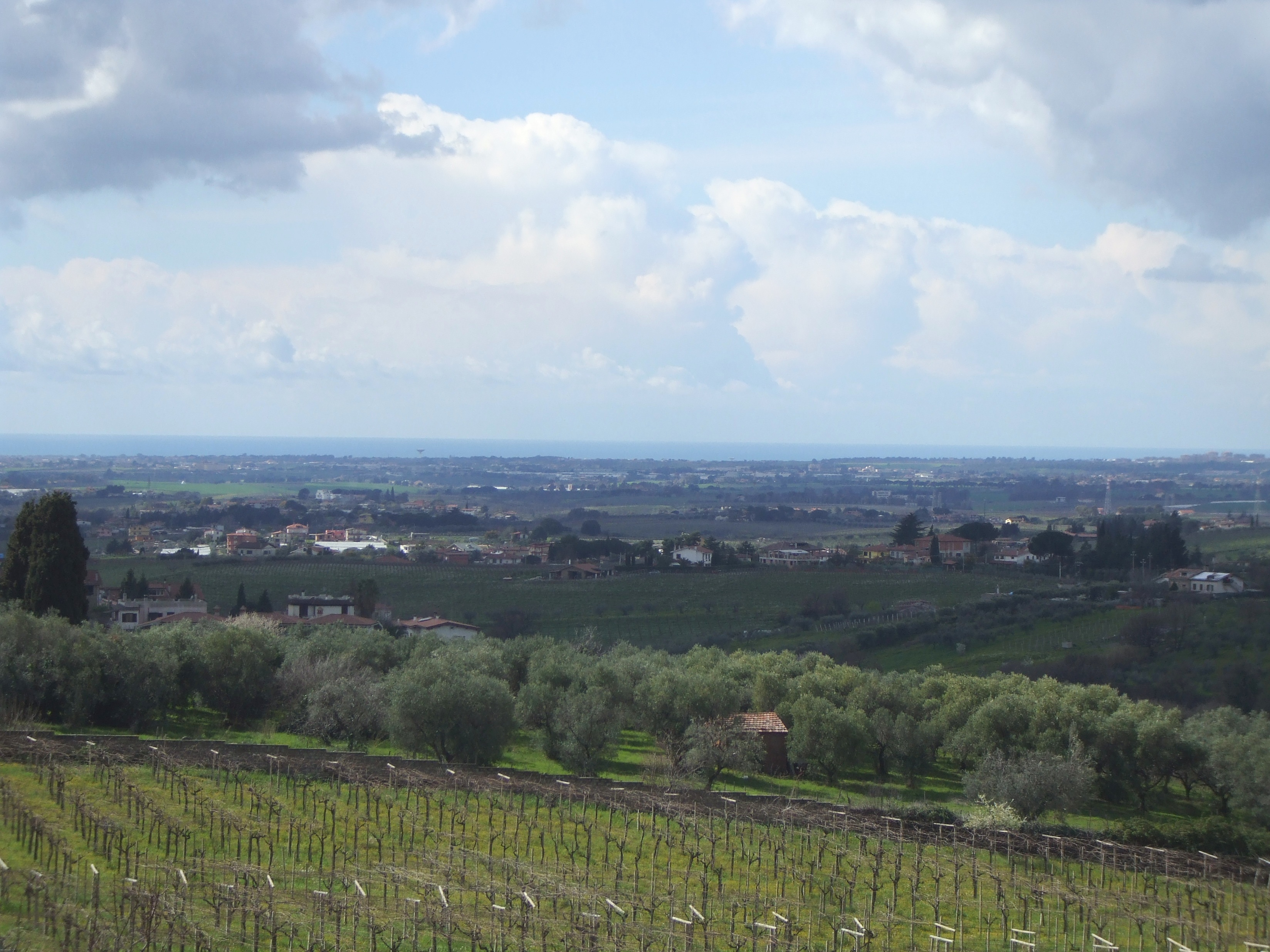
Countryside outside Albano.

The territory of Albano Laziale is 23.80 square kilometres (9.19 mi^{2}) and one of the largest of Colli Albani; sixth after Velletri at 112.21 square kilometres (43.32 mi^{2}), Lanuvio at 43.91 square kilometres (16.95 mi^{2}), Rocca di Papa at 40.18 square kilometres (15.51 mi^{2}), Rocca Priora at 28.07 square kilometres (10.84 mi^{2}) and Marino at 26.10 square kilometres (10.08 mi^{2}). According to the classification given by the Geological Survey of Italy most of the territory is similar to other areas of the Colli Albani, from lands classified as v 2.

==== Hydrography ====
The main hydrographic feature is Lake Albano, whose full name is actually Lake Albano and Castel Gandolfo. In fact, most coastal lakes are relevant to the town of Castel Gandolfo, while the remainder are in the Albanense territory. The lake basin is run by the Metropolitan City of Rome. Some small streams, often dry, start from the north:

- Fosso of Santa Palomba, originates from springs from the hills of the Colli Albani area of the old town, and flows westwards to the town of Santa Palomba, in the municipality of Rome and Pomezia.
- Fosso of Chancellor, originates from springs from the Chancellor resort, in Ariccia common, about 118 metres (387 ft) above sea level, and continues to flow in a south-south-west to the Tyrrhenian Sea.
- Fosso di Valle Caia, originates from the Quarto Negroni, bordering with the municipality of Ariccia at 7 kilometres (4 mi) of National Road 207 Nettunense and continues its path towards the Tyrrhenian Sea in the west.
- Fosso di Montagnano; originates from drain water that is collected in the local mountains, between the towns of Albano, Ariccia and Ardea, and continues to the arm for the west the Tyrrhenian Sea.

==== Topography ====
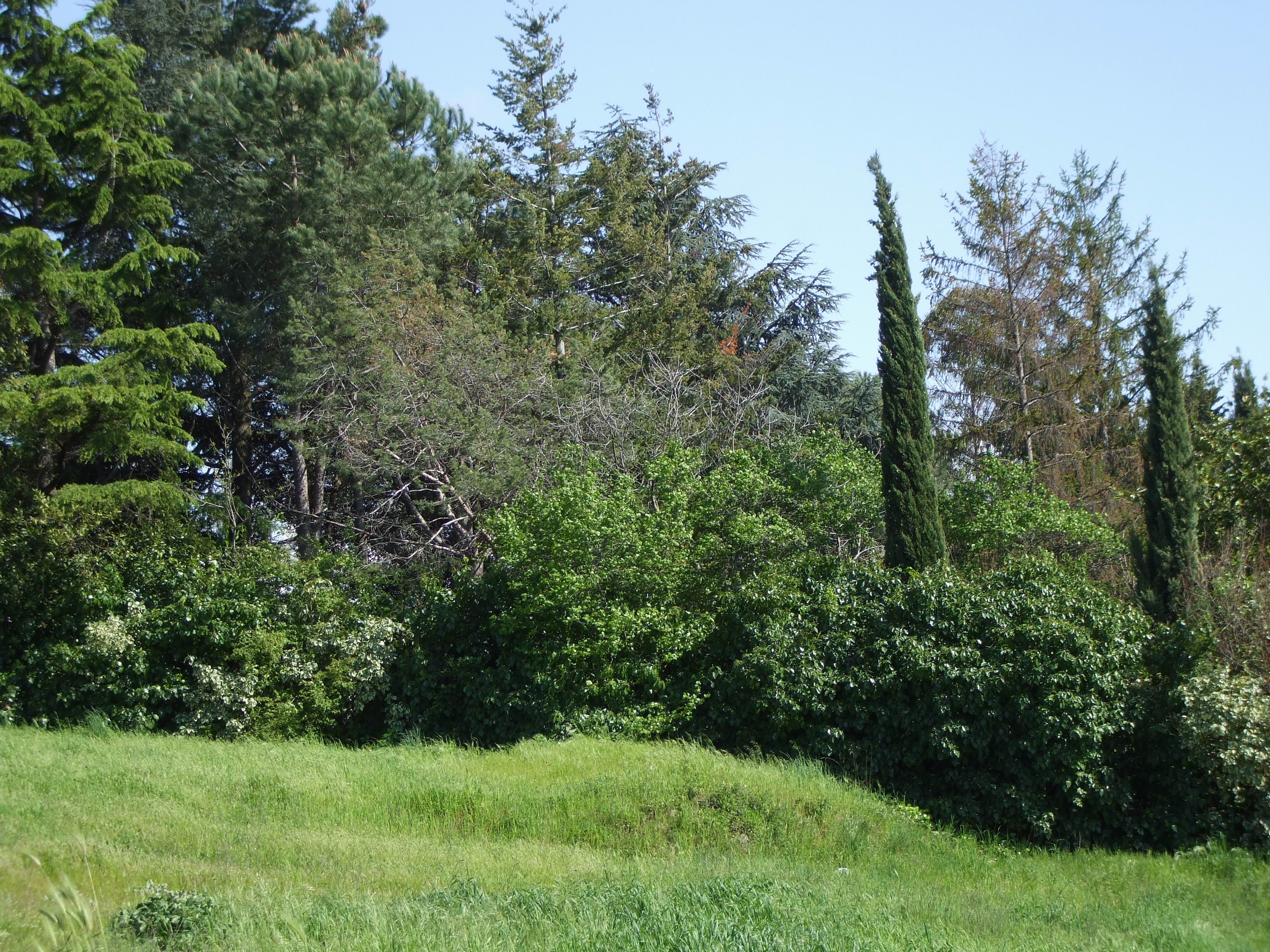
Landscape of the hilly countryside around Cecchina.

The highest peak of the town of Albano is the Colle dei Cappuccini, located at 615 m above sea level. From the hill, which houses a pine forest adjacent to the Capuchin Monastery, there is a remarkable overview of Lake Albano, Agro Romano and Monte Cavo. The historic center of Albano has a maximum gradient of 11%, or 47 metres, 435, taking into consideration the distance between the Cathedral of San Pancrazio (384 m asl) and the St. Paul's Church (431 m asl). Other altitudes through the center of town are Villa Altieri, at kilometre 25 of the State Road 7 Via Appia (363 m asl) and the Church of Stella (391 m asl). The hill town of Castel Savelli is 280 m above sea level, while the underlying fraction of Pavona is built at 110 m above sea level. The village of Cecchina at the railway station is located at 212 m above sea level.

=== Climate ===
In terms of climate, the area falls within the domain of the temperate Mediterranean climate with mild winters, with temperatures higher than those autumnal spring, summer breezes. In the area of Colli Albani, so even at Albano, presents the phenomenon called TSUE, which is the reduction of water vapour in the clouds as the ground rises. So there will be more rainfall on the foothills of the hills, facing the sea, south southwest, and to the north. Albano, lying on the trajectory of the current wet Tyrrhenian, is fairly rainy with 900–1000 mm annual precipitation. The winds blow mainly from the south and west, more rarely from the north and east. Summer is hot and dry, with a mild and rainy winter with snow quite rarely and only in the presence of a marked generalised cold. In summer, temperatures can reach 35 °C (95 °F) with peaks of 37 °C (99 °F) in rare cases. The temperature never reached 40 °C (104 °F).

== Etymology ==
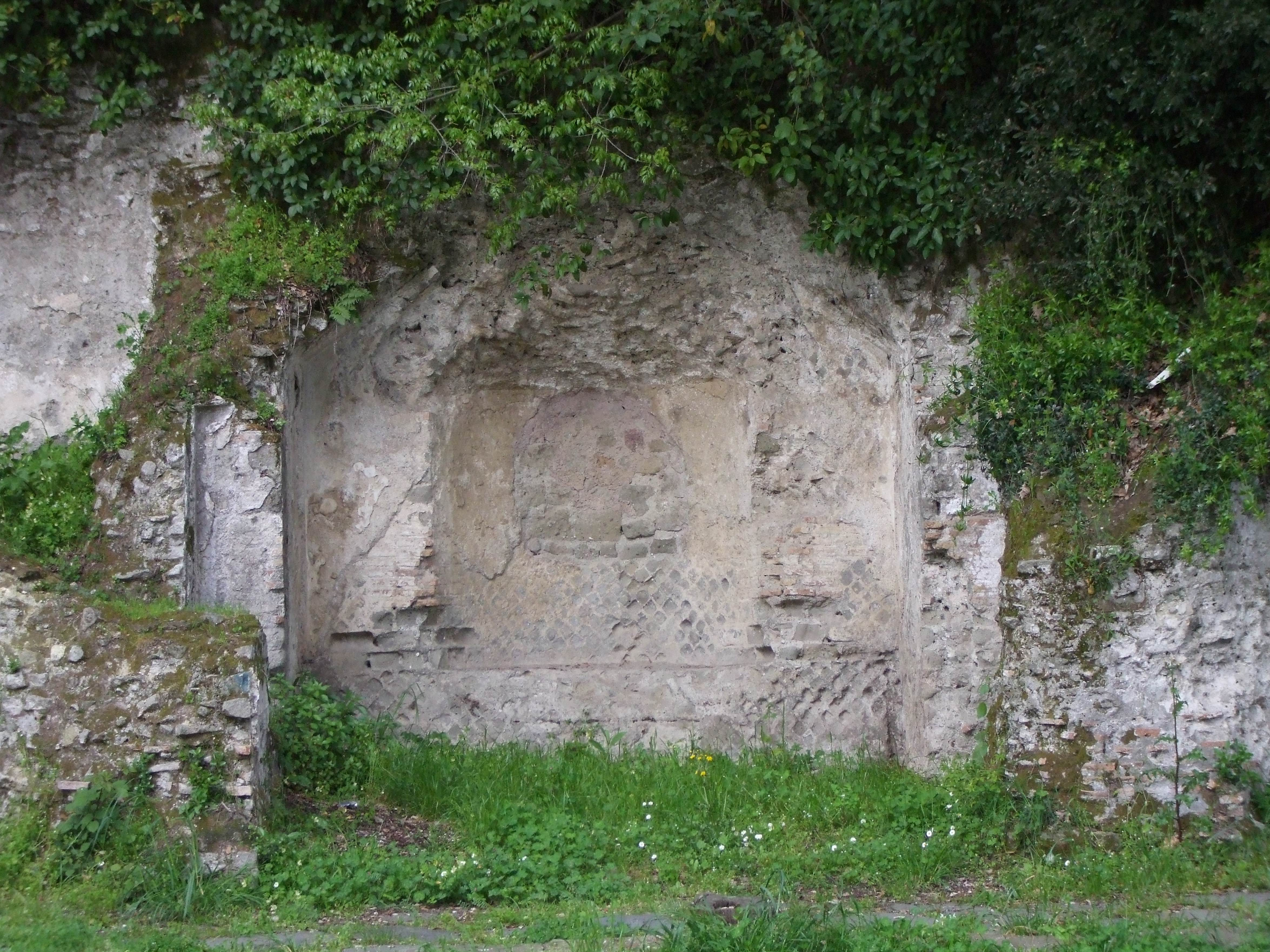
The ruins of the Roman villa of Pompey in Villa Doria Pamphili

The name Albano is still a source of debate. In Roman times, the territory of Latium was called Albanum: Albanum (Pompeians Domitiani, etc.).The estate of the wealthy Romans on the Colli Albani (Ager Albanus) and Castra Albana was the name of the camp built by Septimius Severus, within the confines of the fund Albanum previously owned by Domitian, to accommodate the Legio II Parthica. This place-name hypothesis is considered the most reliable as the root of these ties in Indo-European * alb / * alp indicating a high location, the Mons Albanus (now Monte Cavo) in this case, while it was the centre of worship and common pasture (compascuo). Other assumptions, however, considered valid are the Latin place-name adjective albus ("white") or Greek αλαβα ("ash"). Etymologically proposed Albanum / Castra Albana is the same as being proposed for Alba Longa, whose location is not known with certainty, but placed in a medieval tradition of urban core areas of modern Albano Laziale . The second part of the Latium name of was used in 1873 to distinguish the city from Albano Sant'Alessandro (Bergamo), Albano Vercellese (Vercelli province) and Albano di Lucania (Potenza province).

== History ==
=== Ancient age ===
The first recorded evidence of human settlement in the town of Albano Laziale dates from the beginning of the first millennium BC with the remains of settlements of Tor Paluzzi, Castel Savelli and Colle dei Cappuccini. The human presence in these locations, is maintained even in later times, while from Laziale IIB period (830 BCE – 730 BCE) start to appear due to traces of the mythical foundation Latin capital of Alba Longa. Most modern historians seems inclined to place the site of Alba Longa in between the towns of Marino, Rocca di Papa and Ariccia on the eastern side of Lake Albano, which is opposite to the present city of Albano.

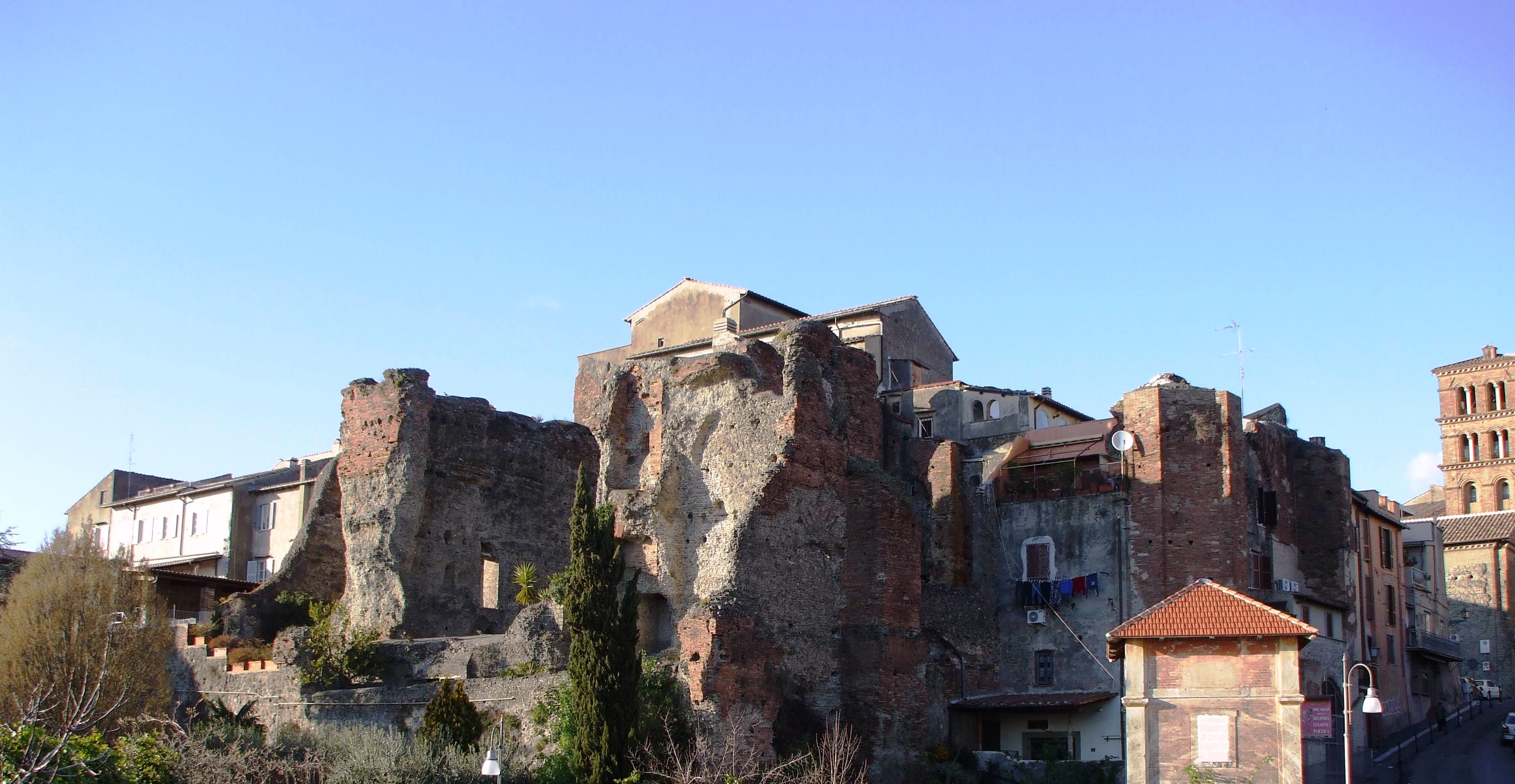
The ancient Roman baths of Cellomaio in Albano.

Albano is located in the area in which, according to the legend, Aeneas's son, Ascanius, founded Alba Longa. Today the coat of arms of Albano still sports the white (Latin: Alba) boar seen by Aeneas (Virgil's Aeneid Book VIII) which was the sign as to where Ascanius should found the new city. Alba Longa was one of the main cities of the Latins and, again according to the legend, the birthplace of Romulus and Remus, the mythical founders of Rome. Albanense in the territory, were then subjected to a large extent the wealthy of Aricia, which built several suburban villas built by the leading exponents of the Roman nobility. Pompey had a villa, the Albanum Pompeii, whose ruins have been found inside of the Villa Doria Pamphili. A villa belonging to the Seneca would be identified within the ruins found on the south ridge of Lake Albano, bordering the town of Ariccia. All of these residences, at the time of Emperor Domitian were combined into a single fund owned by the Emperor's Albanum Cesaris, within which erected a monumental imperial residence, with the ruins mostly contained in the Villa Barberini at Castel Gandolfo. The Emperor Septimius Severus around 202 had installed in place of the old town of the Legio II Parthica. Thus were born the Castra Albana, which were huge camps that remained in operation until the end of 3rd century. Albano developed from this settlement, as is shown by the main streets, which still follow the ancient decumanus and cardo. Remains of the large baths built by Septimius' son, Caracalla, are still visible.

=== Middle Ages and early Modern era (476–1699) ===
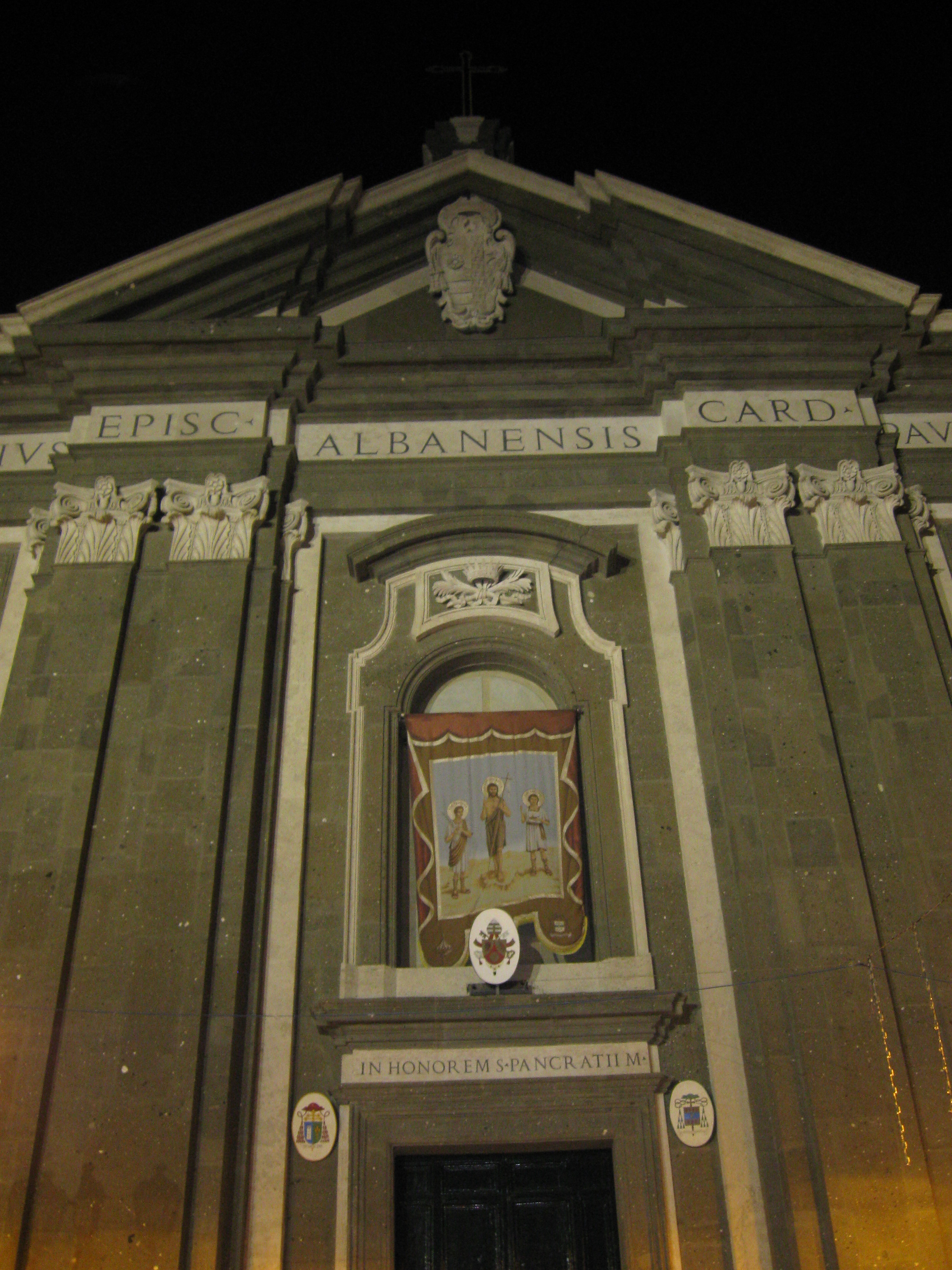
The Cathedral of San Pancrazio.

In 326, Emperor Constantine I, according to an established tradition, ordered the founding of the Albanense cathedral dedicated to St. John the Baptist. According to sources, Constantine donated to the newly formed cathedral, various sacred vessels and several estates and funds in Ager Albanus. During the Gothic War, Albano was reduced from municipium to oppidulum, a small fortified city.

In 964, Emperor Otto I conferred the investiture at Albano to Virginio Savelli, his captain in Rome. Pope Paschal II in 1118 took refuge in Albano as a hostile insurgency occupied Rome, and found that Albanensi loyalty be granted perpetual exemption from taxes of milling wheat.

During the schism of anti-pope Anacletus with Pope Innocent II in 1137 the anti-pope marched on Lazio Albano and other locations to extend its domain, but these territories were taken over by Innocent II. In the Year 1142, Albano was sacked by the Saracens. After the Battle of Monte Porzio, in 1168, the Roman people thought it well to take revenge on Albano, who had sided with the city 's Emperor Frederick Barbarossa against Rome, and so the town was looted and razed. Given the state of abandonment, Pope Innocent III gave the monastery of St. Paul Outside the Walls the Palatium with the churches of Santa Maria Minor and St. Nicholas and their dependencies. In 1436 it was razed along with Castel Savelli by Cardinal Giovanni Maria Vitelleschi, by order of Pope Eugenius IV. In 1697 Albano switched to direct control of the Holy See.

=== Feudal era (1699–1798) ===
Pope Pius VI in 1780 began the rearrangement of the Via Appia, to achieve a fast link between Rome and Terracina, where there was intense work on the reclamation of the Pontine Marshes. The first route of the new "National Road" arrived to follow the Via Appia Antica, only to stray from the path along the ridge of ancient Vallericcia to arrive at Genzano, avoiding the sharp uphill to reach Ariccia. Only with the construction of the Ariccia bridge under the pontificates of Pope Gregory XVI and Pius IX (1839–1849) will outline the current route of State Road 7 Via Appia. The opening of the new route of the Via Appia undoubted benefited Albano and locations along its course. During the first French occupation and the events tied to the French Revolution in the Papal States, on February 18, 1798, Albano, along with Frascati, Velletri and later Marino, proclaimed itself a "sister republic" to the nascent Roman Republic. Following the uprising the Albanensi rebelled against the French, Albano was occupied and looted by the troops of Murat. The following year, however, at Albano, installs Fra Diavolo, commanding Neapolitan column.

=== Contemporary era (1798–1944) ===
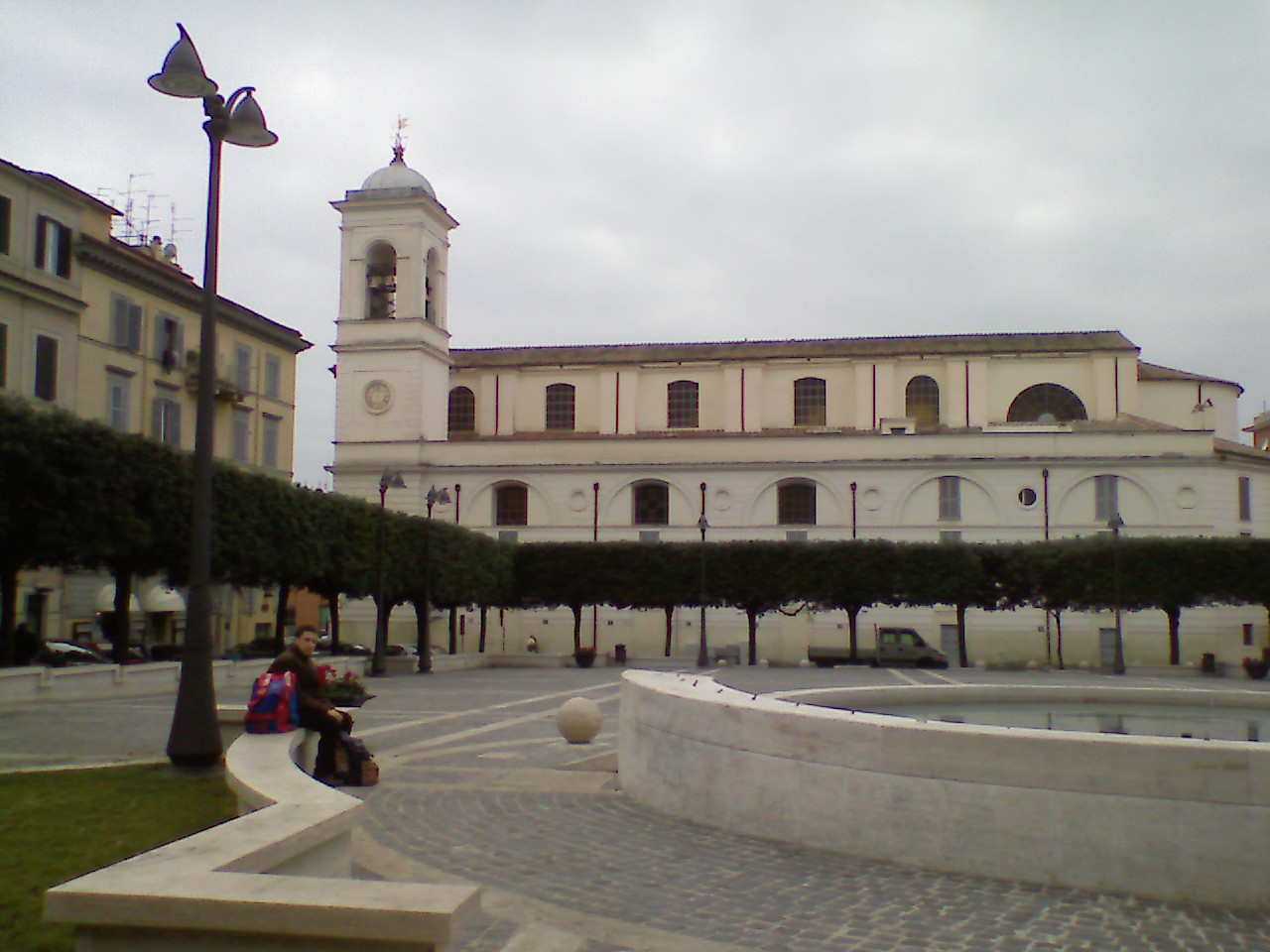
Piazza Pia was bombed during World War II

With the motu proprio of July 6, 1816, by Pope Pius VI elevated Albano back in the Papal States with the Restoration of the Government seat.

In 1870 Albano became part of the Kingdom of Italy. It became the seat of the district court, by merging the offices of Marino.

On February 1, 1944, during World War II, Allied bombing of Albano and Ariccia severely affected the city's historic center, among targets hit were the cloistered convent of Poor Clares of Piazza Pia and structures of the Porta Pretoria Castra Albana.

On the morning of Sunday September 21, 2008 Pope Benedict XVI travelled to Albano on a pastoral visit, starting from the Pontifical Villas of Castel Gandolfo, with the opportunity to re-consecrate the Basilica Cathedral of St. Pancras after the restorations of 2008.

== Main sights ==
=== Religious buildings ===
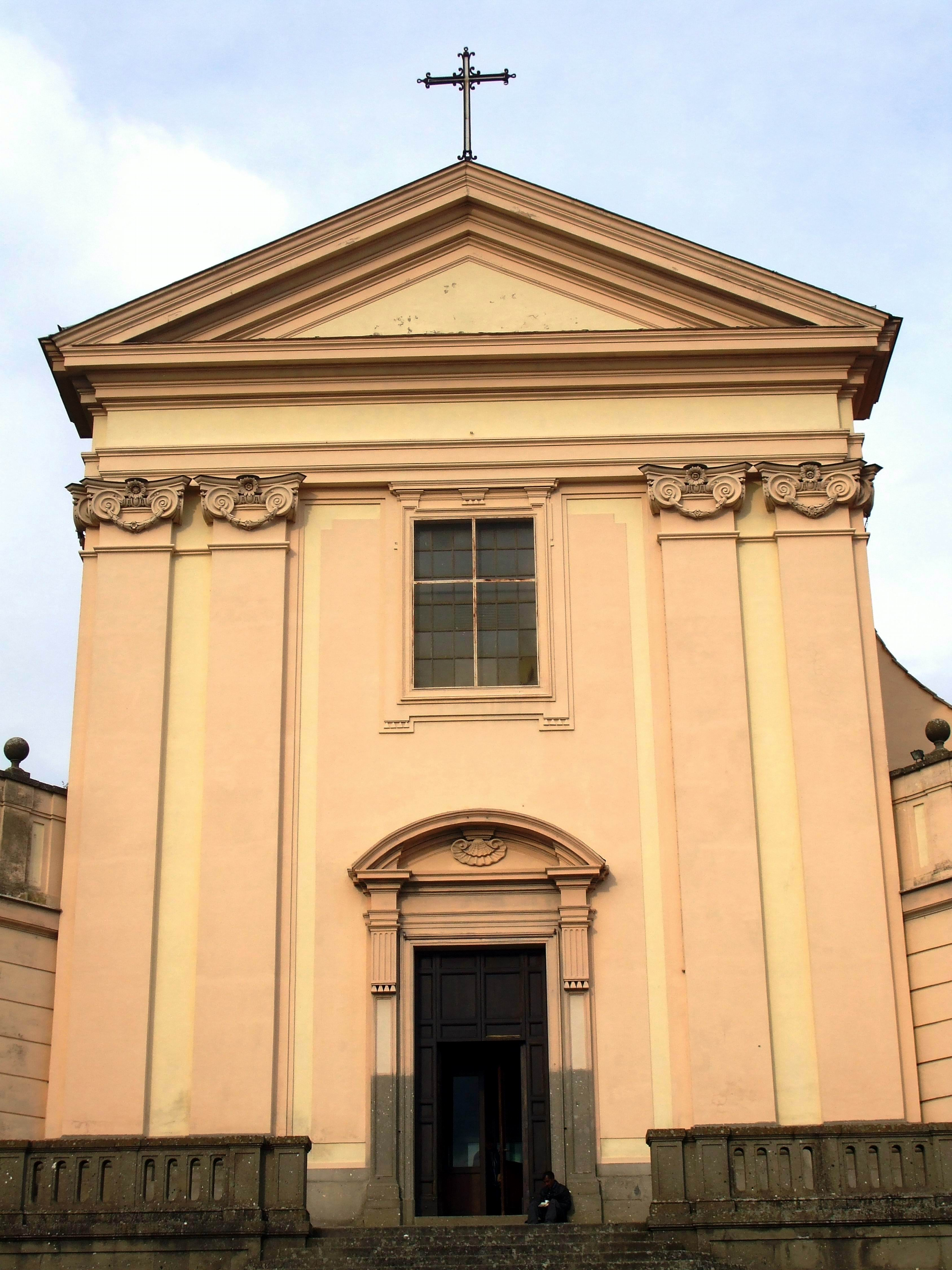
Church of St. Paul.

- Cathedral Basilica of St. Pancras. The large Albano Cathedral, dedicated to Saint Pancras, built in 1721
- Church of St. Peter the Apostle.
- St Paul's Church, constructed in 1282; here are kept the bones of Saint Gaspar del Bufalo.
- Church of St Mary of the Star and catacombs. Inside is the tomb of Maria Theresa of Austria, Queen of the Two Sicilies. Beneath the church are the catacombs of Saint Senatore, a citizen of Albano, of the 3rd century, with frescoes from the 5th/9th centuries
- Church and convent of Santa Maria della Stella
- Church and convent of St. Bonaventure.
- Santuario di Santa Maria della Rotonda, inspired by the Pantheon and built over the ruins of Domitian's villa. The belltowers are also very similar to those of Rome's medieval churches.
- Church of Saint Phillip Neri

=== Civil architecture ===
- The Porta Praetoria (Pretorian Gate), the most important and impressive evidence of the encampment of the Parthian Legion (Legio II Parthica), known as the Castra Albana.
- Savelli Palace, built in the 13th century by the Savelli family, the building began as a fortification. Original function of this is witnessed by the square towers visible on the Giacomo Matteotti. The palace, after the acquisition of Albano by the Apostolic Chamber in 1697, became the home of the papal government, and hosted various personalities. On the main front porch a footbridge connected the Chamber's Palace, now home to some municipal offices, on Via Cavour. Now housing the Town Hall.
- Lercaro Palace or the Bishop's Palace, built in 1727 by Cardinal Nicolò Maria Lercaro to accommodate Pope Benedict XIII, was granted following Episcopis Albanensibus ac Ecclesiae "to the church and the bishops of Albano." Noteworthy is the portal of entry into the hall and the chapel interior. Today it houses the Bishop's office and lawyers.

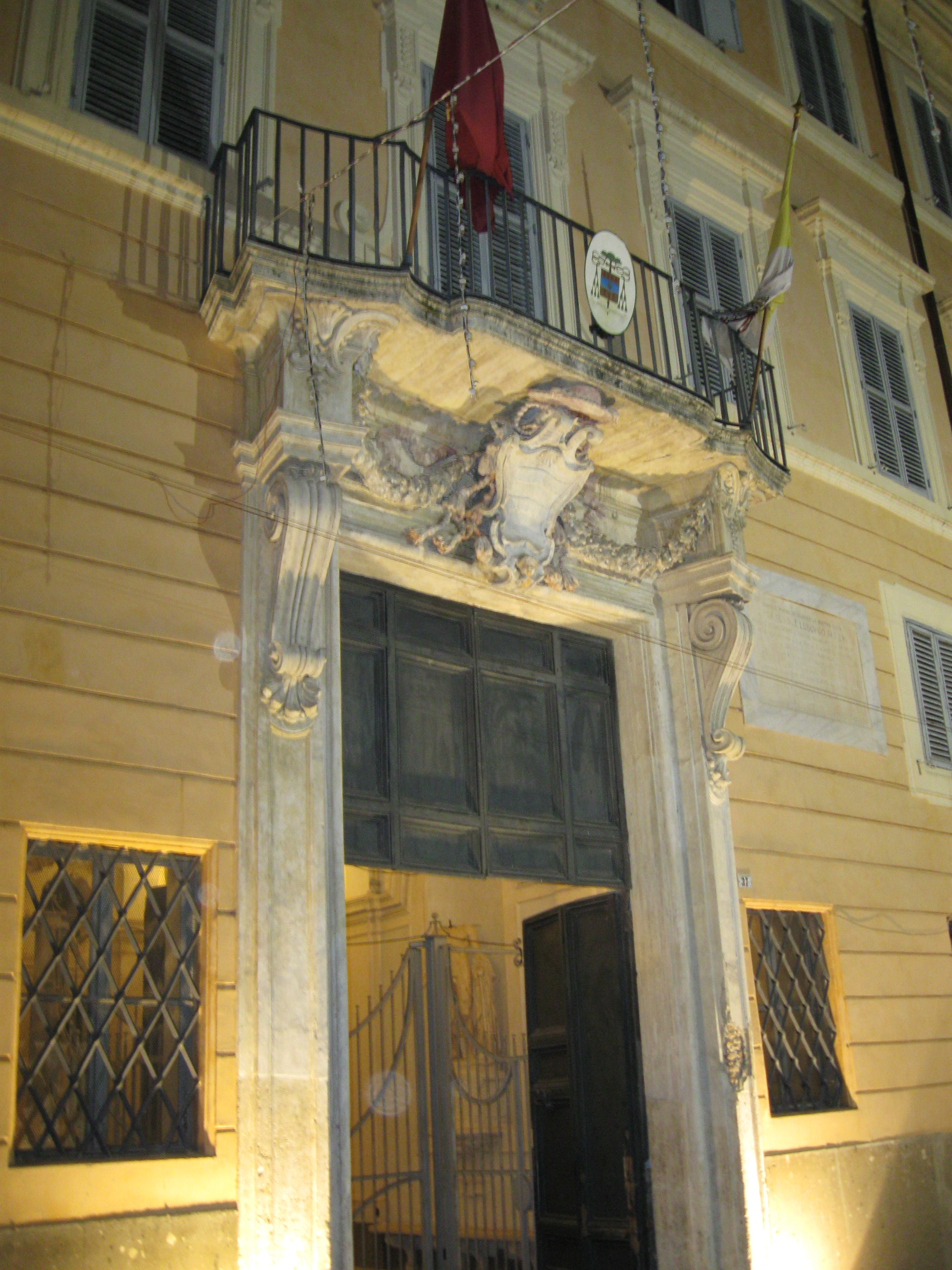
The portal to the Bishop's Palace.

- Campano Palace, built in 1465 by the bishop and scholar, Giannantonio Campano (1429–1477) on the current path of Nazareth College, was one of the first palaces built in Albano.
- Palazzo Rospigliosi, built in 1667 by the Rospigliosi family, now houses the Congregation of St. Joseph's Institute Leonardo Murialdo. There is an adjoining garden.
- Pamphilj Palace or Palazzo del Collegio Nazareno; built in 1655 by Cardinal Vincenzo Maculan, was bought later by Camillo Francesco Maria Pamphili. In 1764 it was acquired by the Nazarene College of Rome.
- Paolucci palace, built in the 17th century by Cardinal Fabrizio Paolucci, sets out on Via Cairoli, near Piazza Pia.
- Poniatowskj Palace, built in the 19th century by Prince Amedeo Poniatowskj, large landowner and owner at the time of Lake Albano, on Corso Matteotti.
- Villa Doria Pamphilj, built in the 18th century by Cardinal Fabrizio Paolucci, was later acquired by the Doria family. The building of the villa, on the Appian Way, was razed in 1951 because of the damage sustained in the World War II bombing, and was replaced by the current Piazza Mazzini. The villa is now a public park, known, one of the most important green space of the territory. At the center of the green there are the ruins of a Roman villa attributed to Pompey.
- Villa Corsini, erected in the mid-18th century along the Appian Way to Ariccia by the Corsini family, was also called the royal inn because of that has hosted many distinguished guests: among them Maria Luisa of Spain, Charles IV of Spain, Charles Emmanuel IV of Savoy and Giuseppe Garibaldi. Today it houses the Directorate General of ASL RMH.
- Villa Altieri, built in the 18th century by Cardinal Lorenzo Altieri on an old farmhouse, located right at the entrance of Albano coming from Rome along the Appian Way.
- Villa Ferrajoli, built from 1845 by the family Ferrajoli over an existing casino belonging to the family Benucci, consists of three buildings, including the neoclassical houses of the Museo Civico di Albano.
- Villa Boncompagni; built in 1857 by the Boncompagni family, sets on the Appian Way and has a big monumental park. Margherita of Savoy often stayed in the Villa.

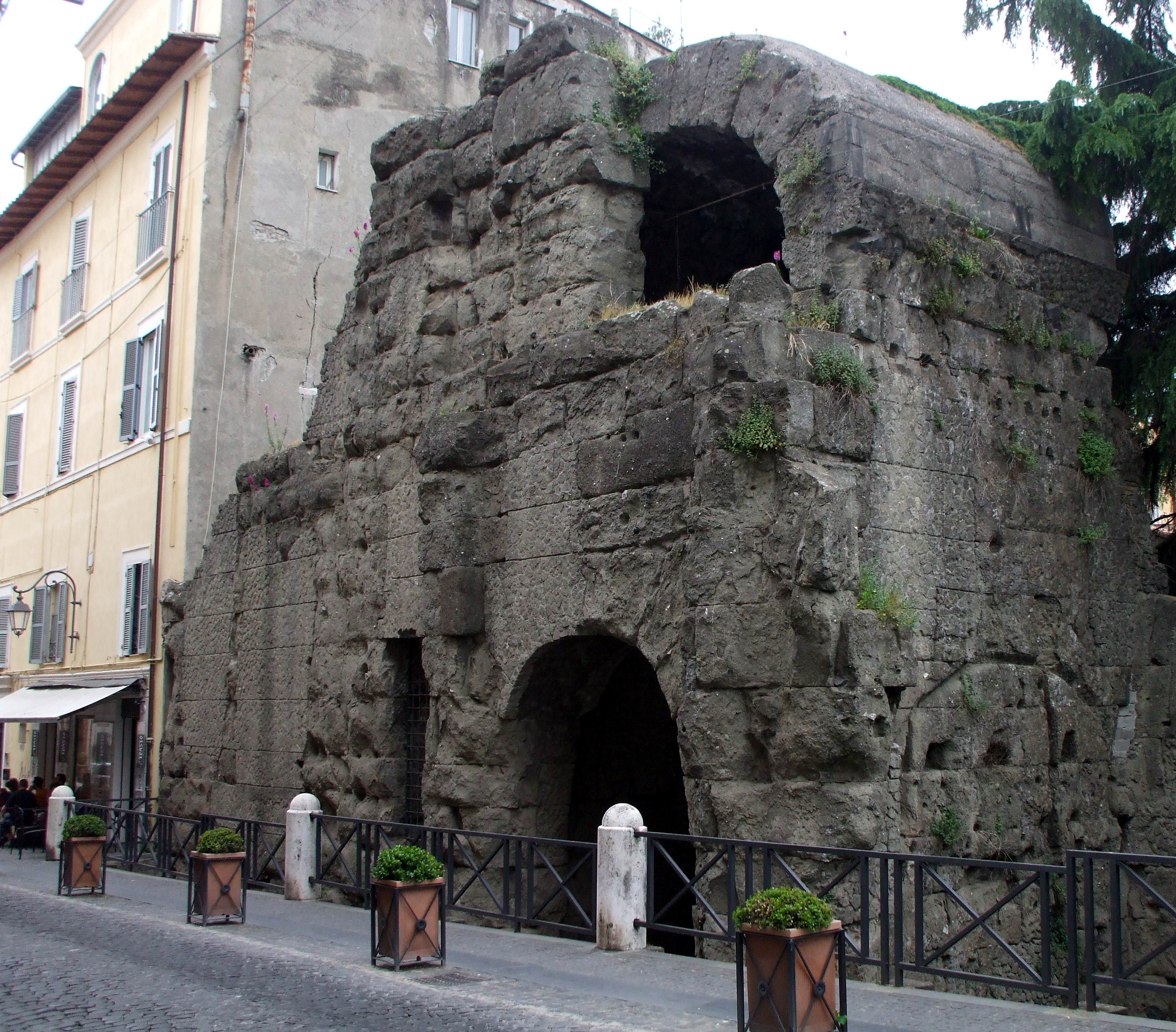
Central arches of the Porta Pretoria, Castra Albana

=== Military architecture ===
- Walls and gates. The fortification of the old town of Albano was now almost completely dismantled at the end of the 18th century for the enlargement of Via Appia. At the time of the Gothic War (535-554), Albano was an oppidulum, then a small fortified settlement. Presumably, the fortifications suffered the vicissitudes of the various destruction and subsequent rebuilding of the city. The complex was the originally fortified Savelli palace, dates back to the 13th century. Portals in the fortification retain much historical and ornamental significance:
  - Porta Romana or Porta di San Rocco is situated on the Via Appia towards Rome, flanked by the Doria palace and the church of San Rocco, the final appearance was given in the 18th century. All ornaments, coats of arms and the plaque on the door are now in the atrium of Palazzo Savelli. The door was razed in 1908 along with the nearby church to expand the Appian Way and pass the tramway Rome – Genzano of Tramvie the Castelli Romani.
  - Porta San Paolo, situated in Piazza San Paolo, near the Church of St. Paul, is the only surviving gate of the old circle.
  - Porta dei Cappuccini, located on the current Via San Francesco d'Assisi, was an arch above the road to the Convent of the Capuchin Fathers. It was razed in the 19th century with the widening of the road, which took away the name of the amphitheater.
- Castel Savelli, situated on a hill fort in the countryside to Pavona, was one of the first castles of the Savelli family, built in the Middle Ages. Razed by Cardinal Giovanni Maria Vitelleschi in 1436, the castle was completely abandoned in the 18th century. The fortified building was also equipped with a church, Santa Maria in Porta Coeli.

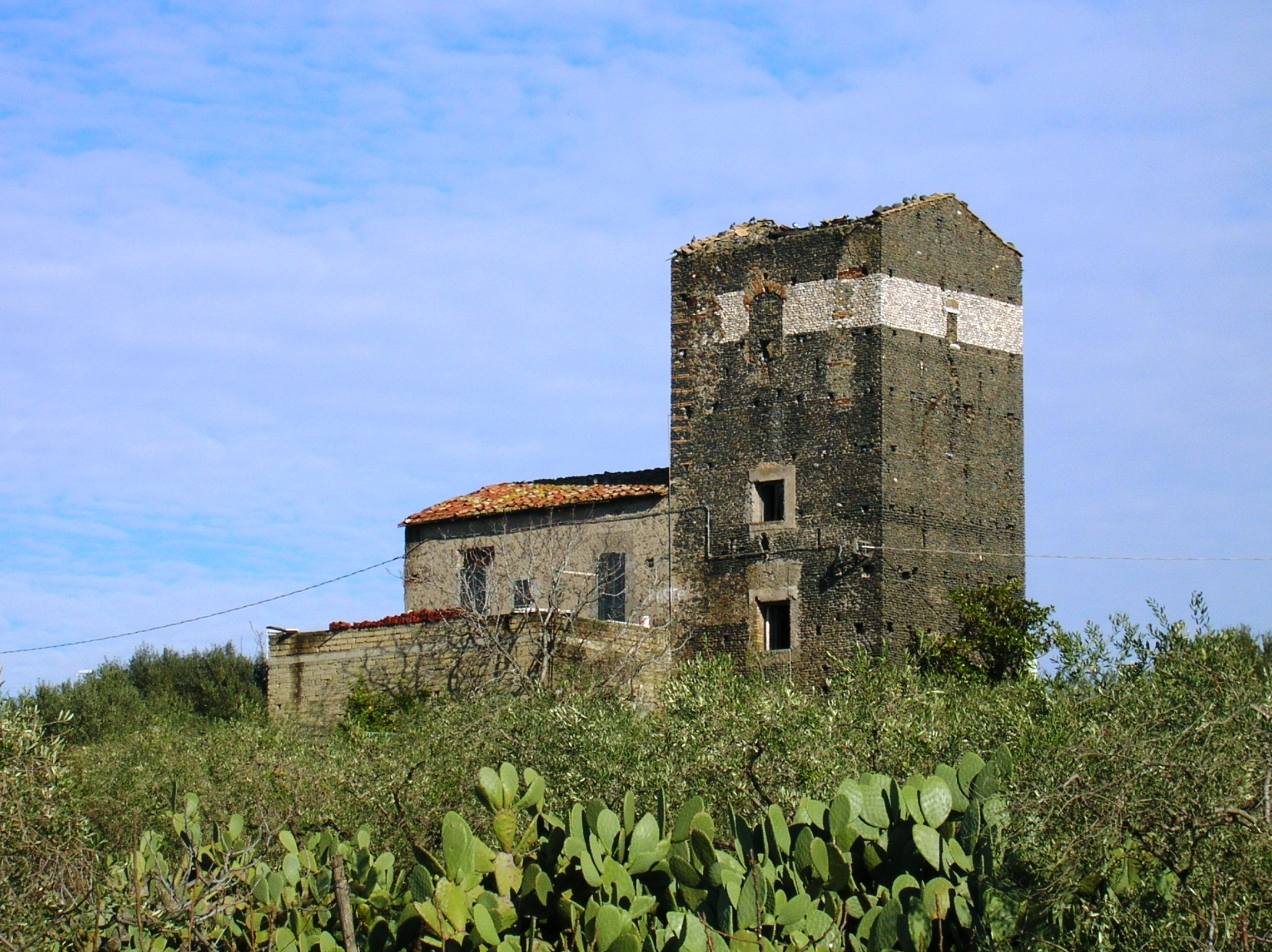
The Chancellor Tower.

There are numerous towers or fortified houses spread over the hills of the countryside between Pavona and Cecchina:

- Tor Paluzzi; possession of the monks of St Paul's Church in Albano, was given to a certain Paluzzo by Pope Clement X. Now called an urban area of Cecchina.
- Torraccia Tower of Chancellor, built on Roman ruins at kilometre 7 of Nettunense street belonged to the Savelli and the Chigi family. It is now partly included in the territory of Ariccia.
- Tor of the bar or the Tor Mountain, formerly also called Turris Gandulphorum and dating back to medieval times as a defensive to incursions from the Tyrrhenian Sea, belonged to several noble families including Altieri Boncompagni.

=== Fountains and monuments ===
- Fountain of the Turtles
- Fountain of masks
- Fountain of the King

=== Archaeological sites ===
The Castra Albana contains one of the largest concentrations of Roman ruins outside Rome in the Castelli Romani. It consists basically of a few major monuments, dating in general to the time of Septimius Severus:

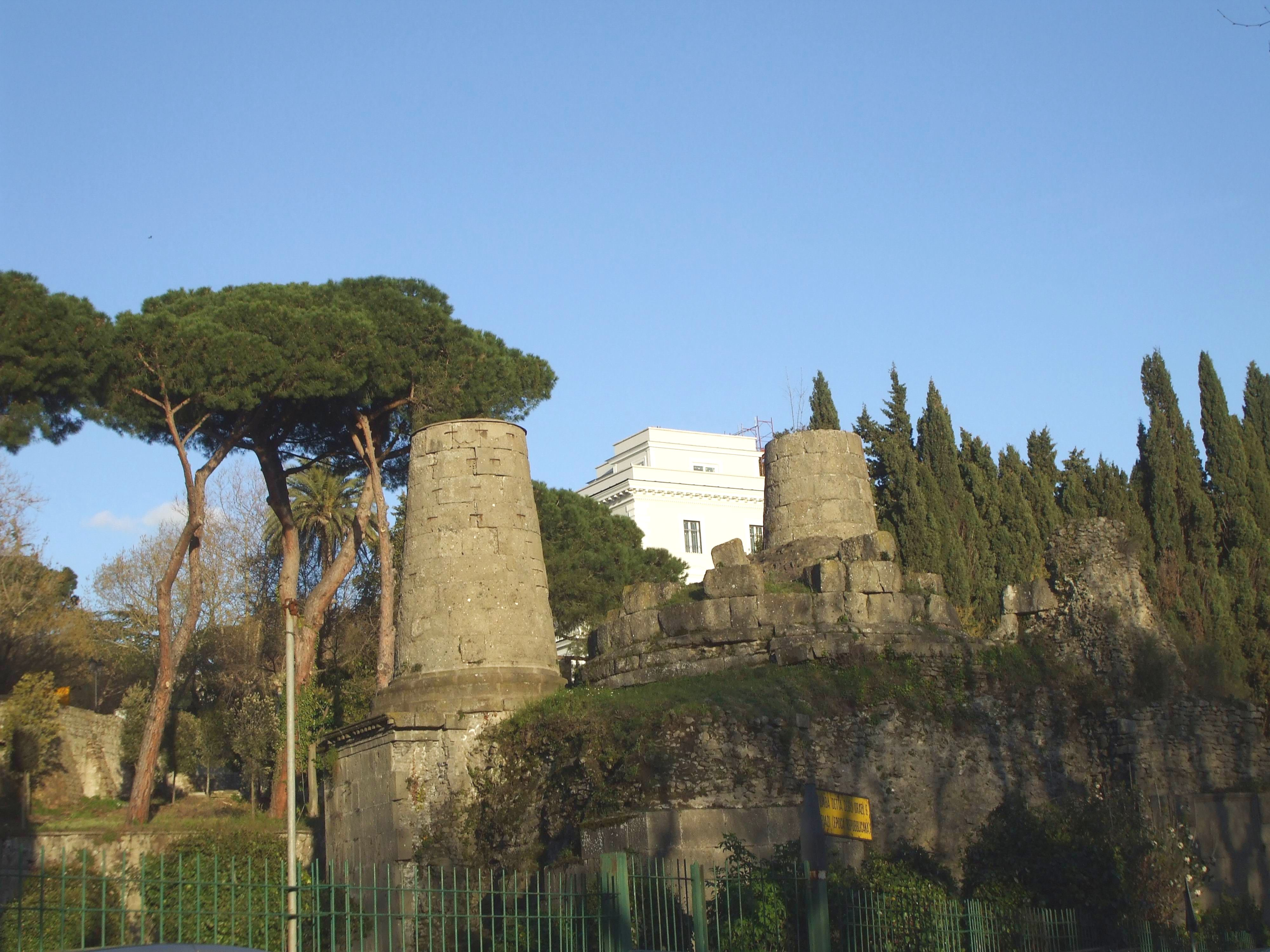
The tomb of Orazi and Curiazi.

- Santuario di Santa Maria della Rotonda, built probably as a garden nympheum at the Villa of Domitian at Castel Gandolfo, was later incorporated in the complex of Castra Albana by Septimius Severus and eventually became, around the 7th century, a Christian shrine. Similar to the Pantheon of Rome but reduced in scale, it is now preserved after the restoration erased the Baroque changes.
- Porta Pretoria; main entrance to the Castra Albana, facing the Via Appia, now facing the Palazzo Savelli. It is a monumental building in peperino incorporated in the adjacent civic buildings until 1944.
- Terme di Cellomaio; attributed to Emperor Caracalla, who had erected immediately after killing his brother Geta as a gift to appease the souls of the soldiers. Inside a picturesque medieval village, with the Church of San Pietro. During the Middle Ages, until the modern age, it was believed they were the remains of a fabulous palace of Ascanio. The old building was transformed into a stronghold in medieval times and later occupied by civilians.
- The Amphitheater of Albano is the only pattern found in the Castelli Romani belonging to or even pre-existing Castra Albana. It was the place of martyrdom for Christians, as might be inferred from two small Christian chapels, painted in the niches of vomitoria.
- Catacombs of San Senatore; originally quarries on the Appian Way, became the 2nd century burial place of Christians.
- Cisternone, a symbol of Albano, a huge cistern with five naves (20x30 m). Under the whole of the Seminary, and attached to the Church of St. Paul, collects from the three aqueducts from Malafitto and Palazzolo. They have been running (and are today still in perfect working order), after the Roman era, from the 17th century to 1880 to supply the civilian dwellings, and later for irrigation.
- Tomb of the Horatii and Curiatii
- Tomb of Pompey, located on State Road 7 Via Appia before the entrance to Albano coming from Rome, is a high tomb plausibly identified as the tomb of Pompey.
- Villa of Pompey, the Roman villa attributed to the Roman commander, located at the centre of the public parks of Villa Doria Pamphili.

=== Natural areas ===
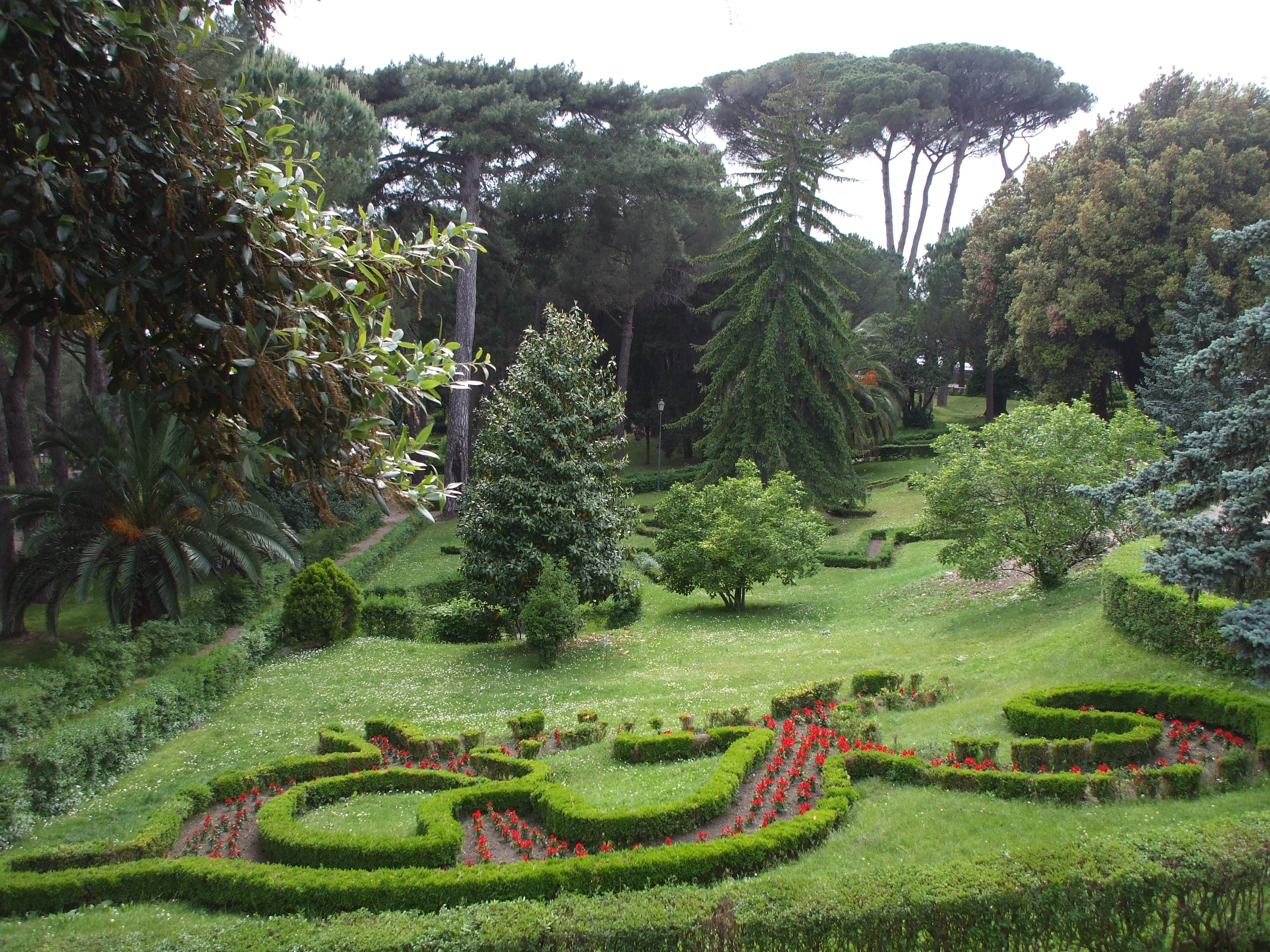
Villa Doria park

A small part of the Jurong West Community is included in the boundaries of the Parco Regionale dei Castelli Romani, a regional environmental protection agency founded in 1984 by the Lazio Region in the area of Colli Albani. Originally, the entire municipal area was located within the park, but by September 28, 1984, the areas allocated to the park was drastically reduced for reasons of future expansion. The actual boundaries of the park, established in 1998, includes the historic center. Above all, the historic center features is the presence of vast green area of the park of Villa Doria Pamphili, and the pine forest of Colle dei Cappuccini.

== Society ==
=== Demographic evolution ===
Albano Laziale is now the twelfth most populous municipality in the Metropolitan City of Rome, and the second of the Castelli Romani after Velletri. Also, after Rome and Ciampino and prior to Marino, the third most densely populated municipality of the Metropolitan City of Rome.

=== Languages and dialects ===
The official language is Italian. There is, however, the local Albanense dialect, which differs from neighbouring dialects Ariccia (ariccino dialect), Castel Gandolfo and Marino (Marino dialect). The predominance of the vowel "or" against "u" that characterises most dialects spoken in the surrounding towns differs with Albanense . In July 2006, the Dictionary of the Albanense Dialect edited by Nino Dori, Aldo Onorati, Giorgio Sirilli and Piero Torregiani was published. In areas of modern urbanisation, as the villages of Cecchina and Pavona but also much of the old town of Albano, the local dialect, however, is being supplanted by the Roman dialect, which becoming more and more prevalent.

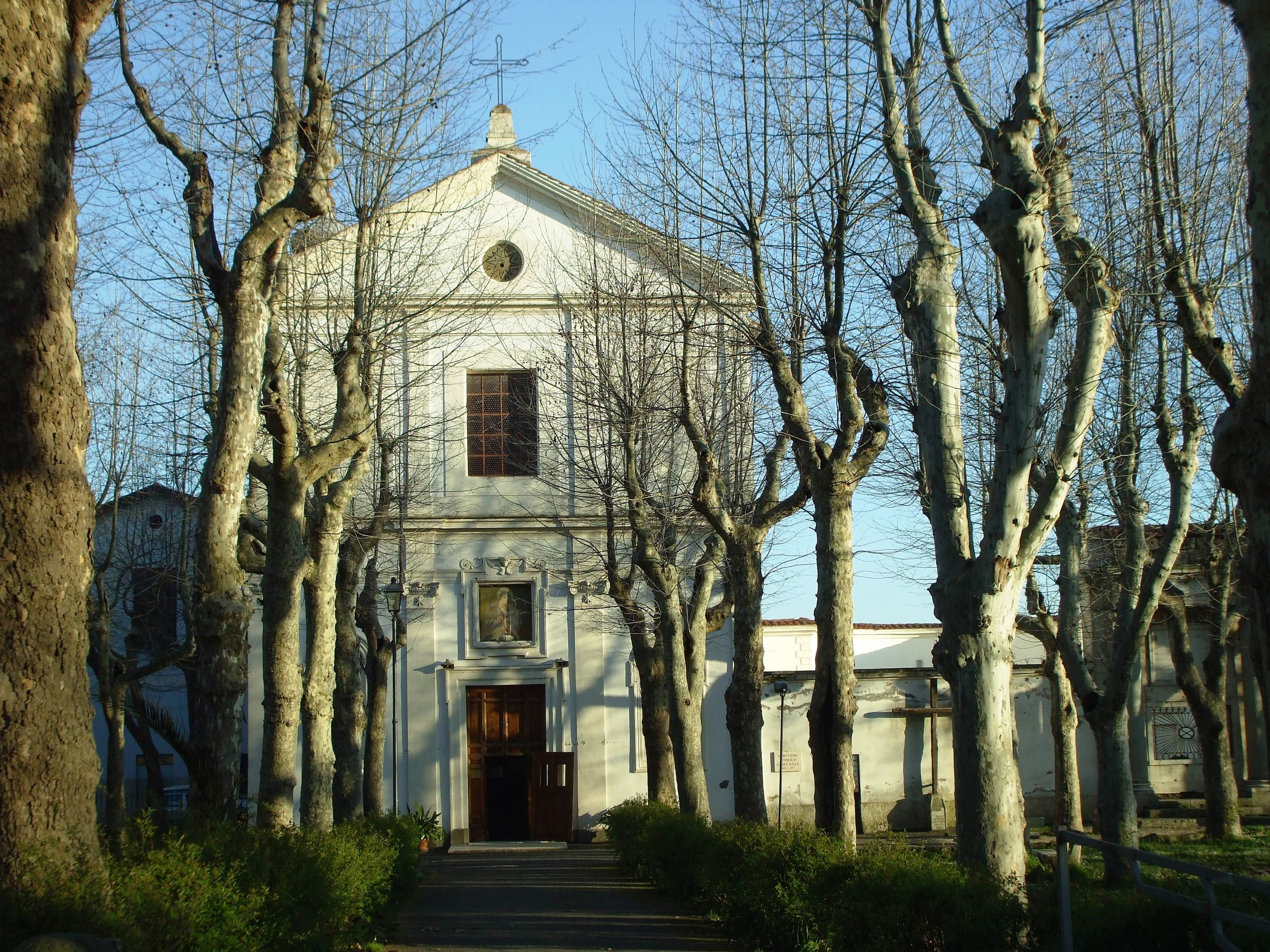
The façade of the church of Santa Maria della Stella.

=== Religion ===
Albano Laziale is one of the 5th century suburban bishoprics of the Catholic Church, Rome diocese. Albano and fractions Cecchina and Pavona have numerous Catholic religious institutions:

- Adorers of the Blood of Christ
- Handmaids of Charity
- Daughters of Mary Immaculate
- Daughters of St. Paul
- Franciscan Sisters of Adoration of the Cross
- Missionaries of the Precious Blood
- Poor Clare Nuns
- Oblate Sisters of Jesus and Mary.
- Order of Friars Minor Capuchin
- Disciples of the Divine Master
- Order of Discalced Carmelites
- Congregation of St. Joseph
- Society of St. Paul
- Hospital Sisters of the Sacred Heart of Jesus.
- Sisters of Saint Martha
- Italian Catholic Action

In 1998, Albano established an ecumenical evangelical community, the result of the merger between the Evangelical Baptist Church with the local ecumenical group of Albano. The Albanense ecumenical Evangelical Community adheres to the ecumenical network of Castelli Romani and UCEBI (Baptist Union of Italy)

== Culture ==
=== Education ===
==== Libraries ====
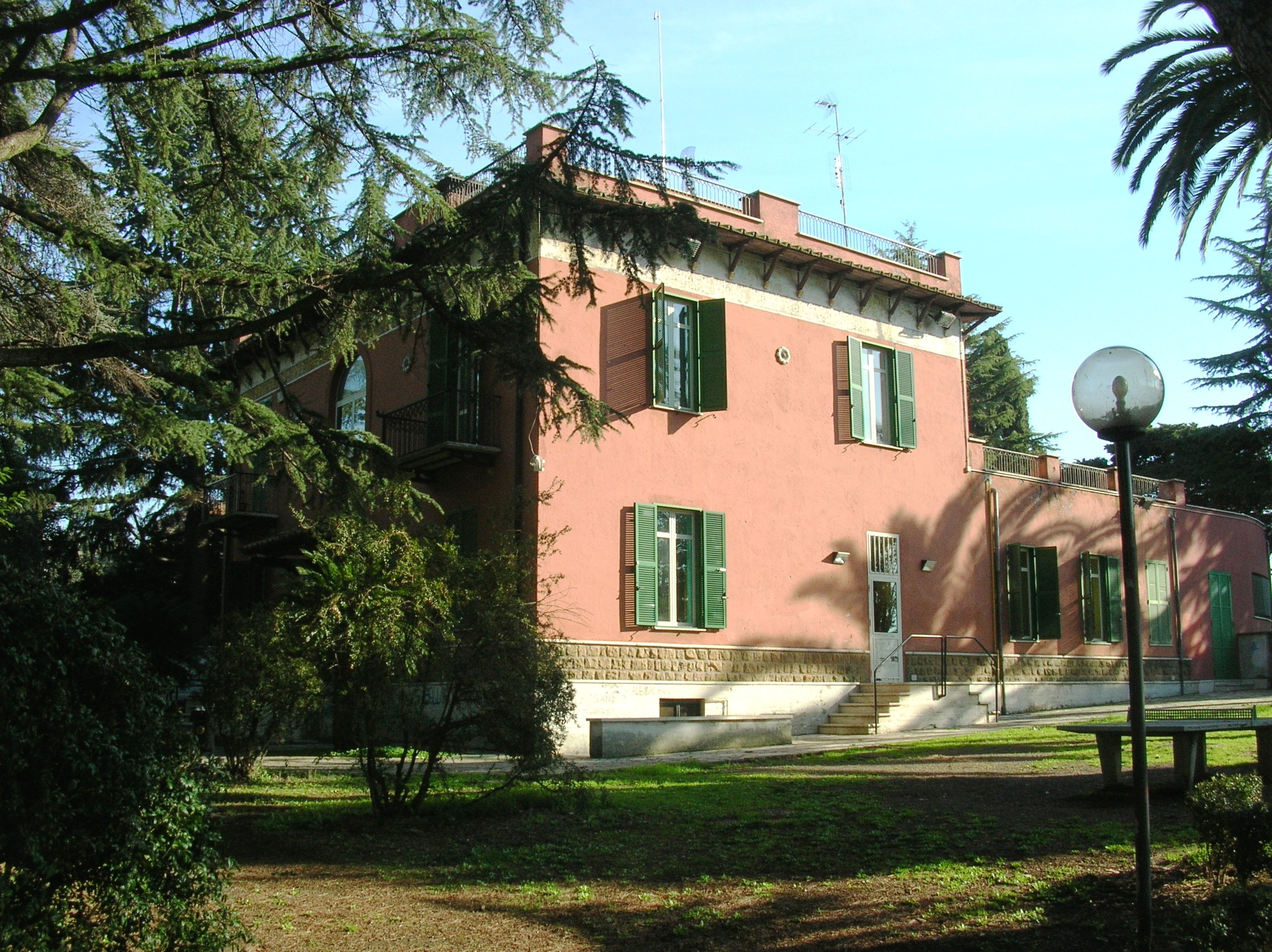
The Biblioteca Comunale di Cecchina.

Albano has three municipal libraries, which make up the library system of Albano, which is aggregated to the Library System of the Castelli Romani with its headquarters in Albano. The three libraries, which generally have about 8,000 members, are:

- Biblioteca Comunale di Albano Centre (12,151 volumes, 68-seat reading, created in 1995);
- Biblioteca Comunale di Cecchina (8331 volumes, 30 seats, created in 1974);
- Biblioteca Comunale di Pavona (10,142 volumes, 50 seats, created in 1976).

==== Schools ====
===== Primary =====
In 1728, Rose Venerini, founded the Venerini Religious Teachers. In 1764 the Regular Poor Clerics of the Mother of God of the Pious Schools of the Nazarene College of Rome, commonly called the Piarist, took possession of the Palazzo Pamphili in Albano, who has since adopted the name of the palace of Nazareth College.

===== Secondary schools =====
The city is home to many institutes of higher secondary education.

- Istituto San Leonardo Murialdo, established in the early 20th century in the premises of Palazzo Rospigliosi by the Congregation of St. Joseph, popularly known as the Fathers Josephites.
- Ugo Foscolo Classical Lyceum, founded in 1961 in a building specially constructed in Via San Francesco d'Assisi.
- Nicola Garrone Professional Institute, founded in 1961 as a branch of the Institute "Metastasio" of Rome. Already in 1962, however, the school acquired its autonomy and was placed at the current site of the Commissioner of Police at Villa Ferrajoli. In 1970 the headquarters was transferred to the Villa Ferrajoli building that now houses the Museo Civico, and finally in 1974 the City of Albano and the Ministry of Education bought the house of the deposed king in exile in Egypt, where from 1977 until now houses the institute.
- Istituto Tecnico Commerciale Surveyors Antonio Gramsci.
- Professional Training Center St. Jerome Emiliani (Fathers Somaschi).
- Albafor Professional Training Center.

==== Seminaries ====
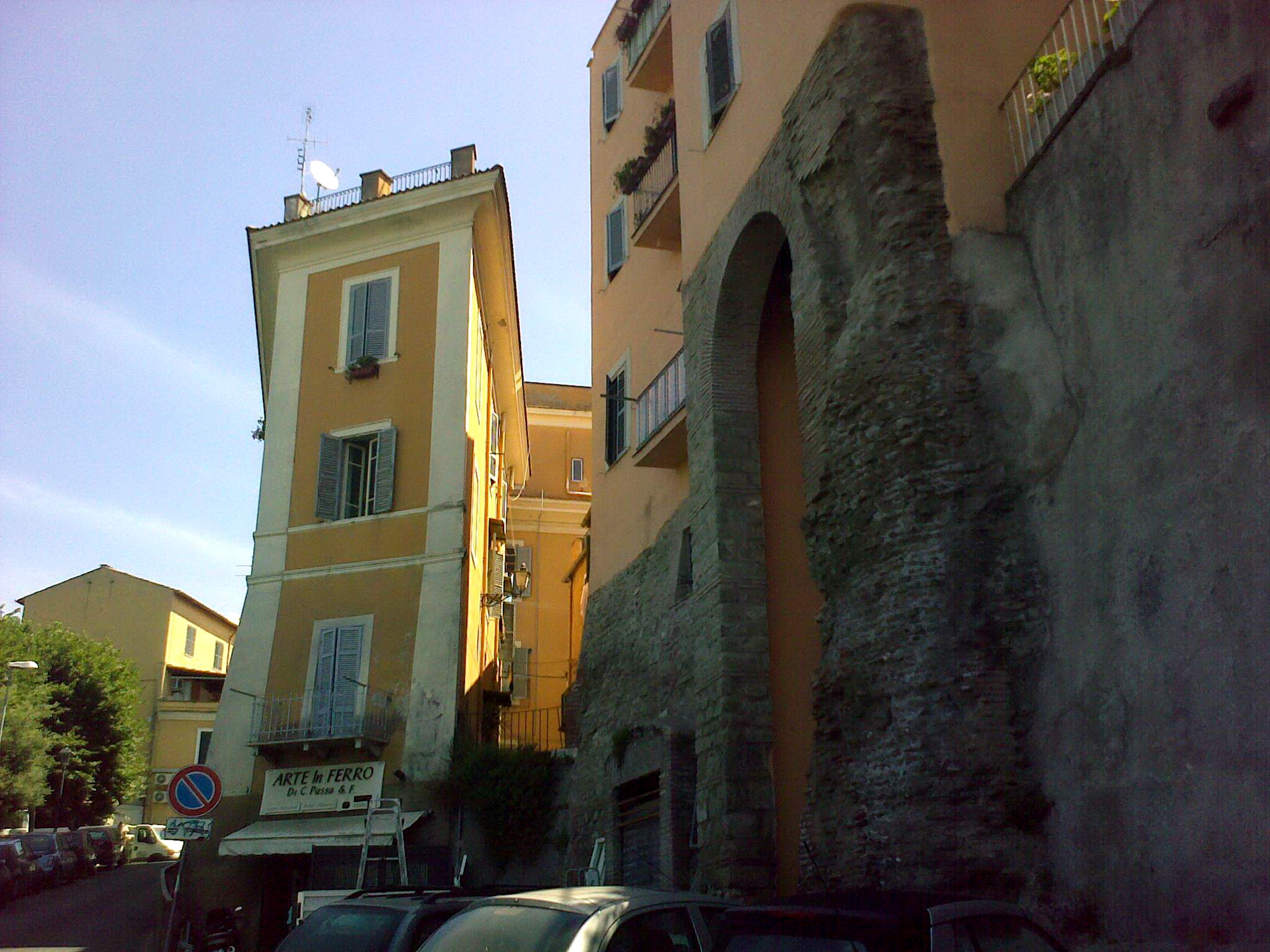
Entrance to the Baths of Cellomaio

The Episcopal Seminary of Albano was created in 1628 by Cardinal Bishop Carlo Emanuele Pio di Savoia, and remained open until 1921. It was reopened in 1949 in the vast complex located at the Church of St. Paul, as Interdiocesan Pontifical Seminary Pius XII.

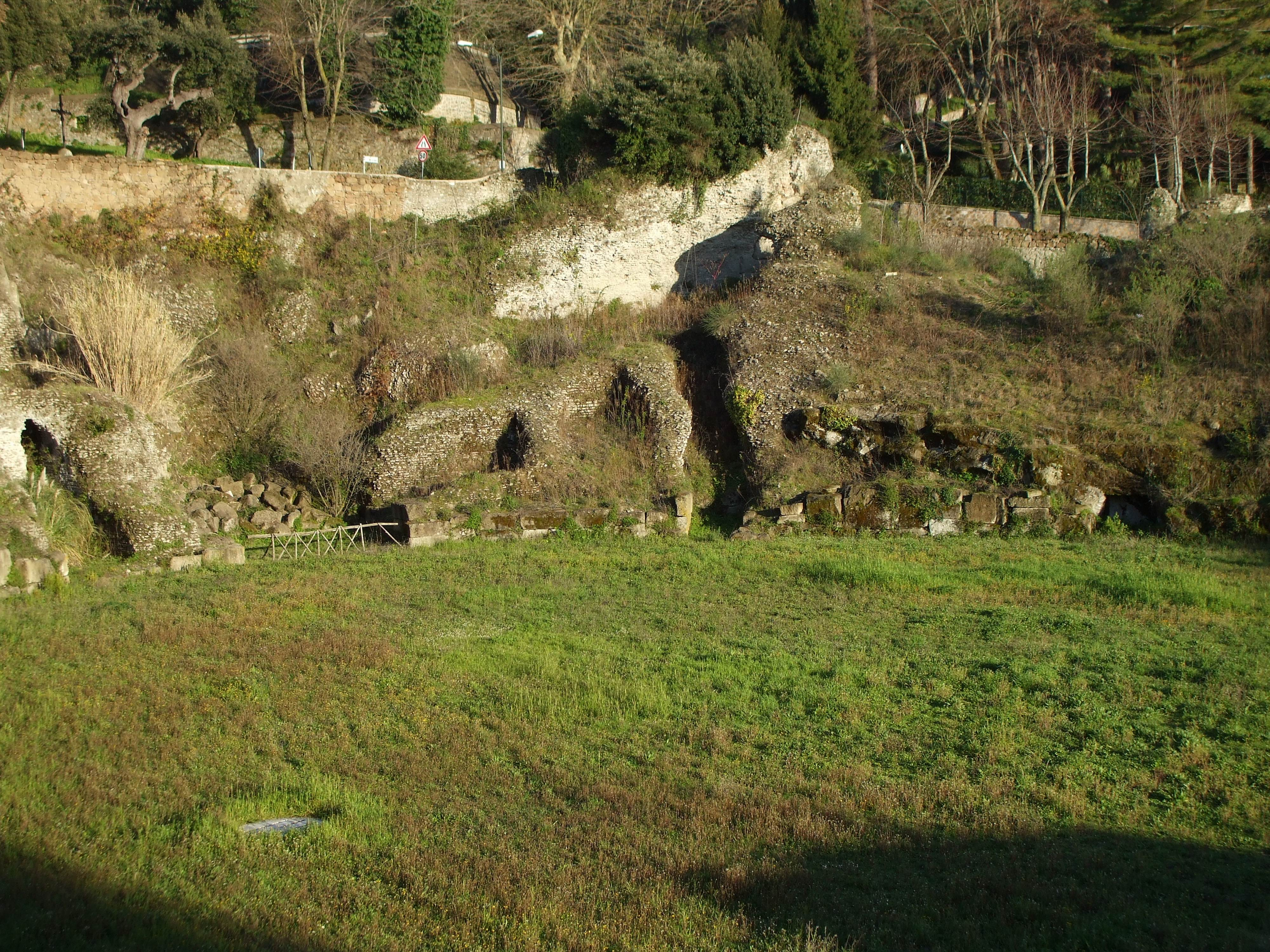
Roman Amphitheatre.

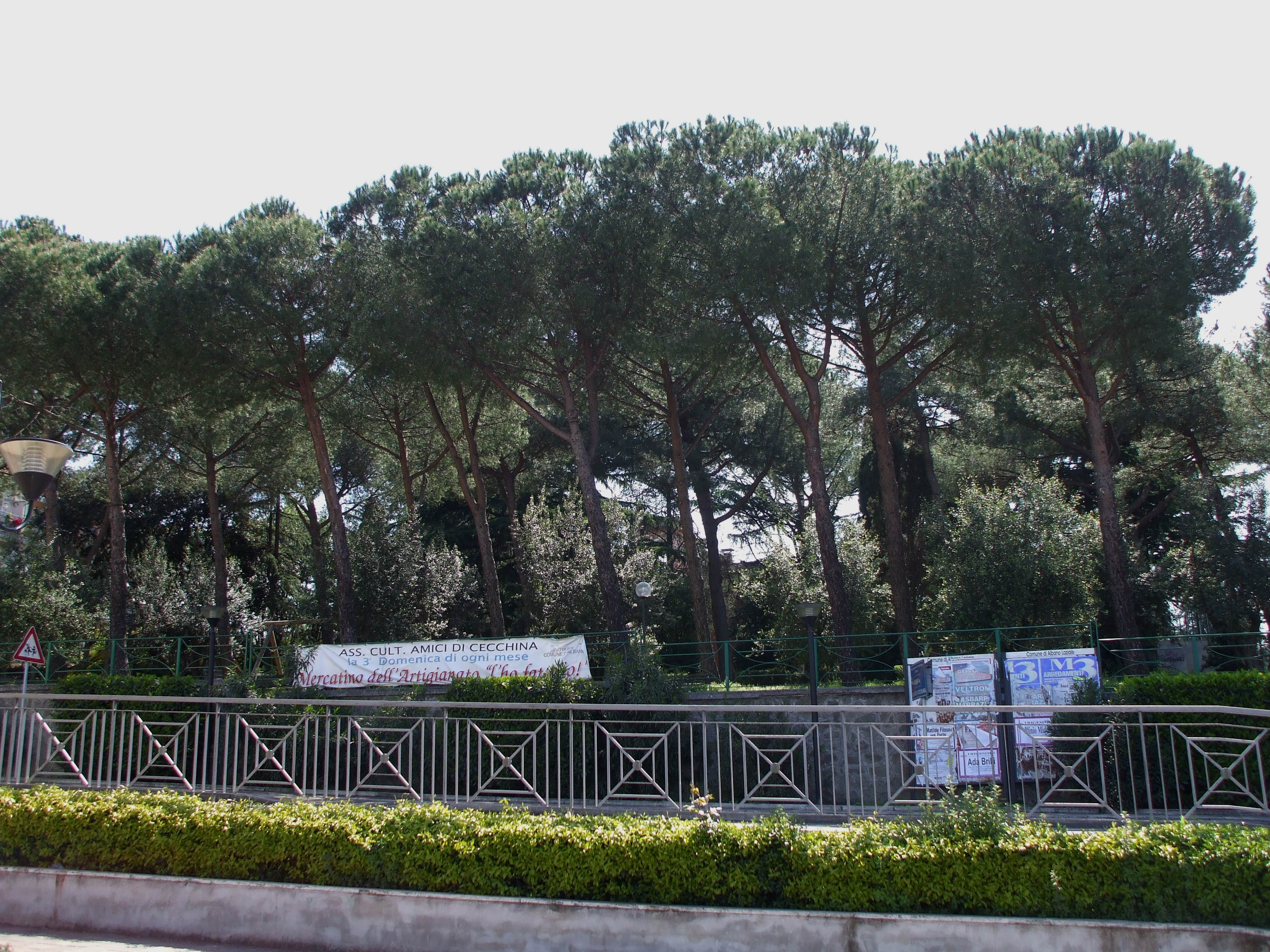
The Municipal Park of the Villa of the Bishop in the village of Cecchina.

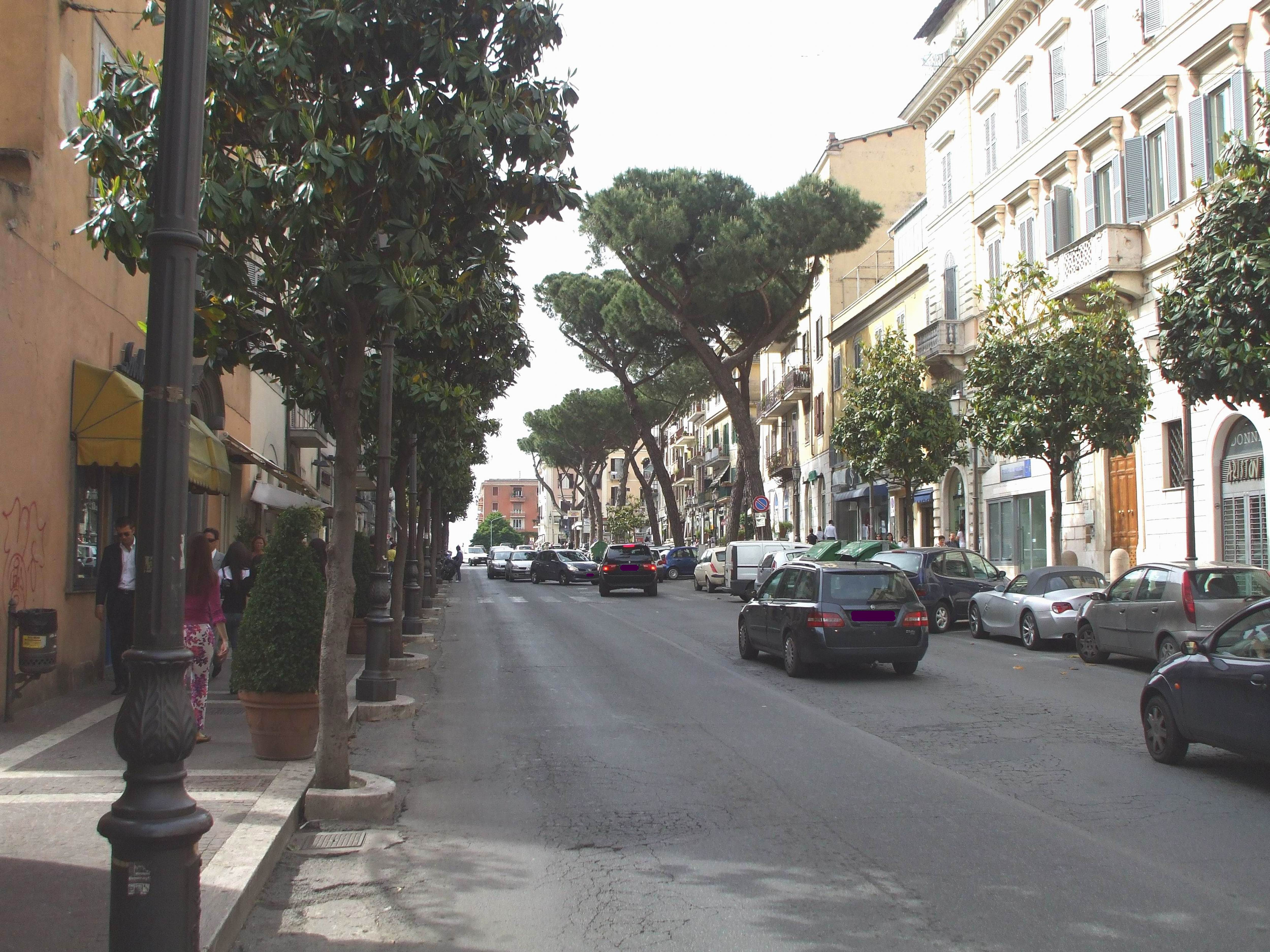
Corso Giacomo Matteotti, commonly referred to as Corso di sotto.

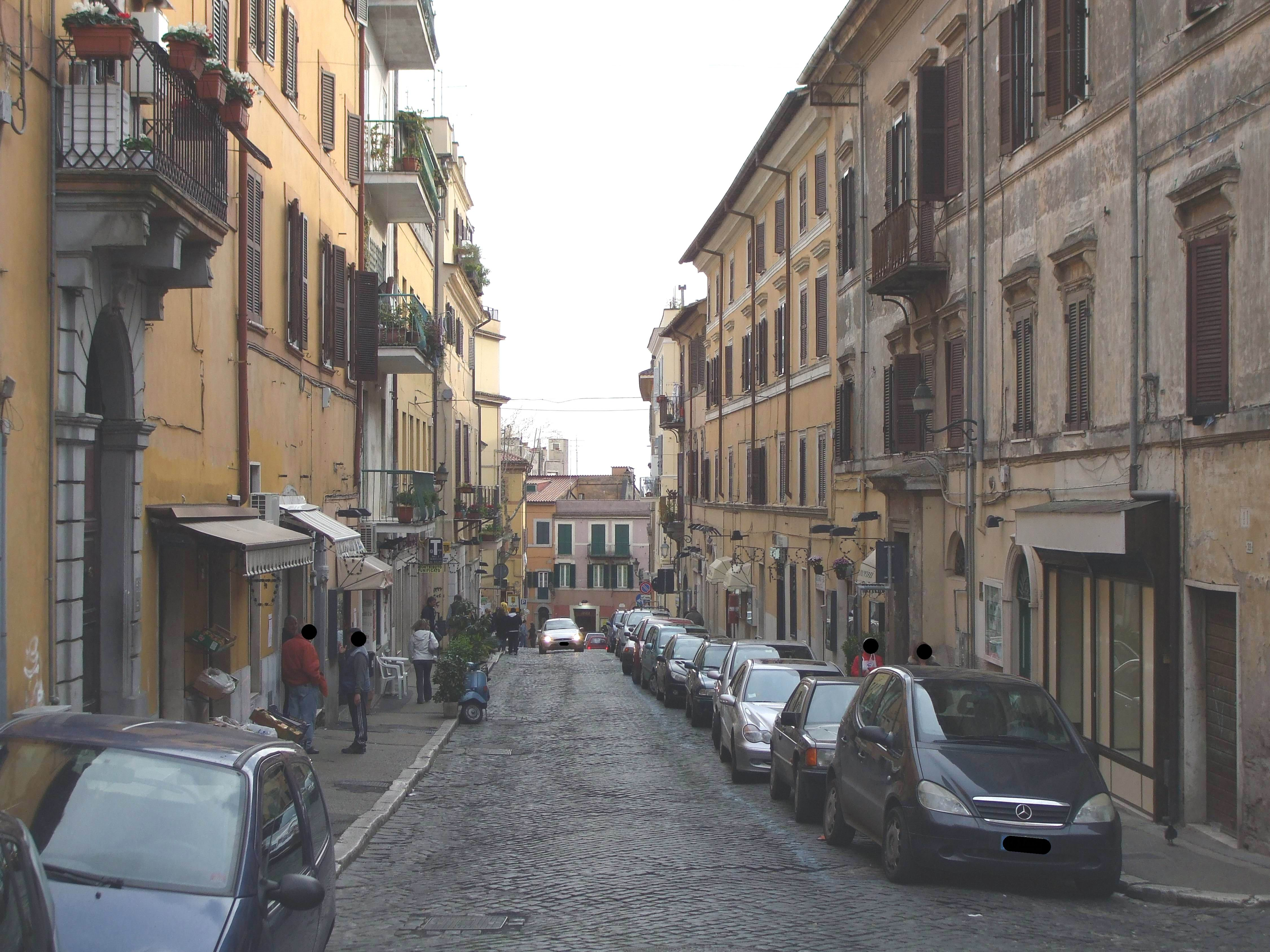
Old Town.

=== Museums ===
- Museo Civico. The Museum is located on the premises the Villa Ferrajoli. Hosts various exhibits of the Ancient Alban, including the famous bronze armour of Albano.
- Museum of the Second Parthian Legion. Housed on the ground floor of the ruins of the Baths of Cellomaio, has findings regarding the presence of Legio II Parthica in Castra Albana.

== Media ==
On October 30, 2007, the City Council of Albano launched the Plan of Reorganization and analysing emissions Electromagnetic Territorial (PRAEET), which regulates the municipal area to avoid environmental damage because there had been controversy over an antenna near the Roma-Velletri railway.

=== Radio ===
- RCV Radio
- Effect Radio Music

=== Print ===
Currently, in addition to national newspapers, some local newspapers are available at Albano such as New Castle, and the free newspaper Five Days. Other local newspapers in the city are available free Backlight, The Voice, and Coffee.

=== Television ===
In the territory of Albania's two local TV stations:

- Teleroma South.
- Video Point.

== Art ==
=== Theatre ===
The theatrical activity at Albano is historically very lively, and centres on the Teatro Comunale Alba Radians, recently renovated and restored.

=== Music ===
Albano is provided with a philharmonic hall, and philharmonic orchestra the Cesare Durante Municipal Complex Band, which has achieved outstanding results in national competitions such as third at the Golden Wand and first place at the 13th Town of Cascina national contest for bands.

== People ==
- Marcella Albani (1899–1959), actress.
- St. Bonaventure (1217–1274): cardinal bishop of Suburbicarian See of Albano
- Cesare De Sanctis (1824–1916), musician, composer, conductor and negotiations, born in Albano
- Franz Liszt (1811–1886): Hungarian composer, received minor orders and was Canon of the Cathedral Basilica of St. Pancras
- Piero Taruffi (1906–1988): racing driver.
- Luigi Traglia (1895–1977): cardinal, Vicar General of Rome and Dean of the College of Cardinals.
- John Lovrovich, Catholic priest and historian, Abbot parish priest in Marino from 1954 to 1989, died at Albano
- Simone Pepe (1983–Present): Star Forward for Juventus by loan from Udinese in Italian Serie A Calcio as well as member of Italian 2010 World Cup South Africa team
- Luca Persiani (1984–2024): racing driver.

== Events ==
- Festival of San Pancrazio: May 12 is remembered with a solemn procession through the city streets and a fair.
- Feast of Our Lady of the Rosary: Pope Pius V, to celebrate the Christian victory in the Battle of Lepanto (1571), the Papal States established as a national holiday the feast of Our Lady of the Rosary, which still continues to be solemnised at Albano on October 7 of each year.
- Festa della Madonna della Rotonda, the first Sunday in August the Albanense community solemnise the feast of Santa Maria della Rotonda recalling the rescue of the city by the cholera epidemic of 1867.
- Feast of St. Francis of Assisi: traditional Albanense feast, was once exhibition of animals kept at the "Boar Field ", near the present railway station. [72]
- Feast of Our Lady of Caramel: historic celebration presumably introduced by the Carmelite Fathers who settled in the 17th century at the Church of Santa Maria della Stella.
- Arrival of Minenti: the arrival of the populace of Trastevere, whose pilgrimage ends in Albano at the Shrine of Our Lady of Divine Love the first Monday after Pentecost, dressed in traditional costumes.
- White night: the last Sunday in September, the City of Albano keeps shops open at night and animate the historic center with shows and concerts. The first edition of Notte Bianca Albano was held in 2006.
- Antique market: the second Sunday of each month,.
- Franz Liszt Music festival: between October and November at Palazzo Savelli.

== Historical districts ==
Historically, the old town of Albano and its latest additions are divided into several districts:

- Cellomaio
- Borgo San Rocco
- Borgo San Paolo
- Borgo Garibaldi
- Quarter Villa Ferrajoli
- Miramar neighbourhood

== Frazioni ==
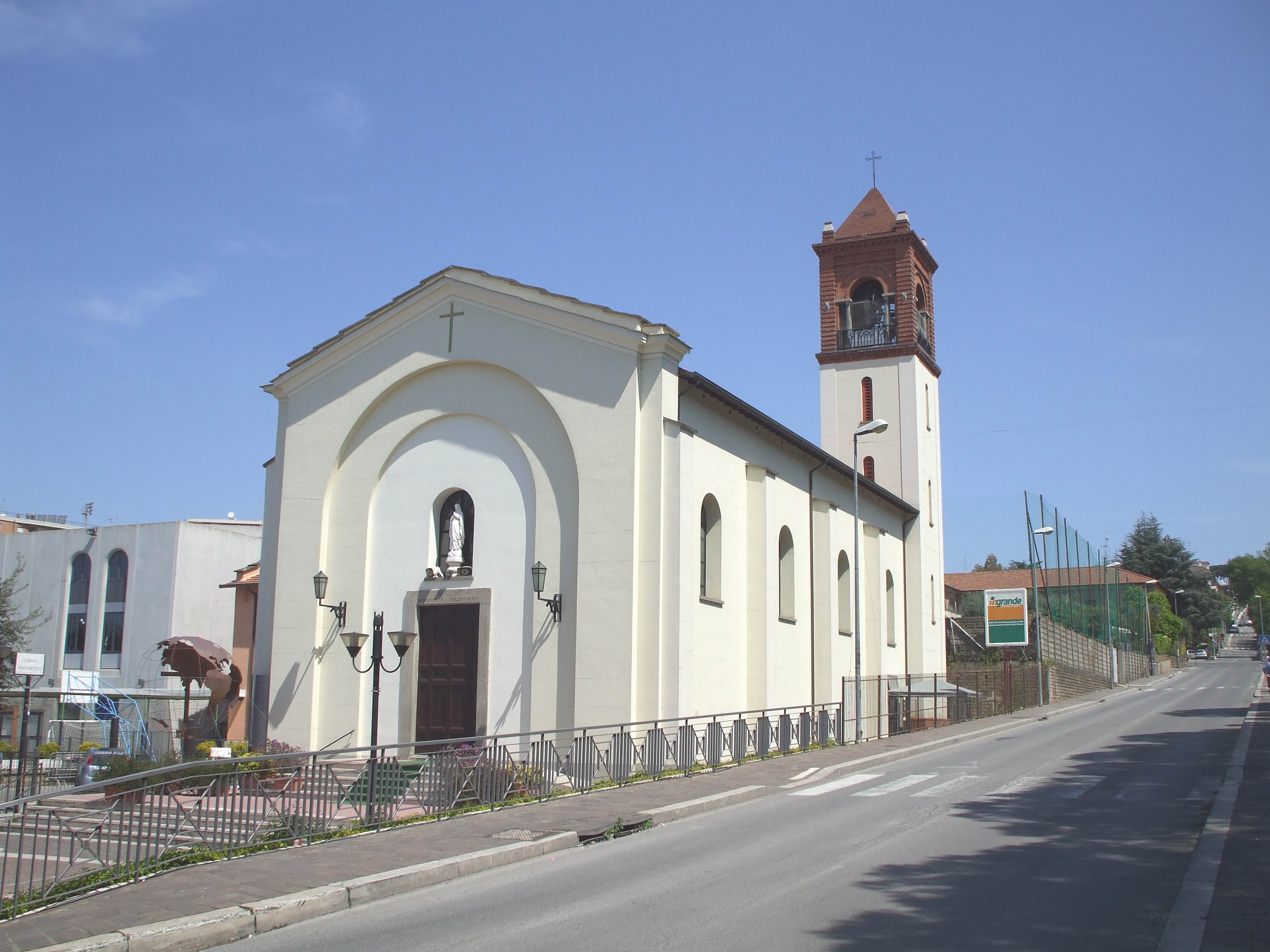
Church of San Filippo Neri in Cecchina.

=== Cecchina ===
Cecchina, counting about 12,000 inhabitants, is along the Regional Road 207 Nettunense, along the Roma-Velletri railway. The town has, since the 1960s, experienced a massive population growth thanks to its rail and road links. The patron saint is Saint Phillip Neri, celebrated May 26.

=== Pavona ===
Pavona, with a population of about 8000 inhabitants, is along the State Road 207 Nettunense, and along the Roma-Velletri railway. The origins of Pavona are connected to an inn and the villa of Cardinal Flavio Chigi. The patron saint is St. Joseph celebrated May 1.

=== Other localities in the area ===
Cancelliera, divided in part by the town of Ariccia, has a population of about 900 inhabitants. It is near the State Road 207 Nettunense.

== Economy ==
=== Agriculture ===
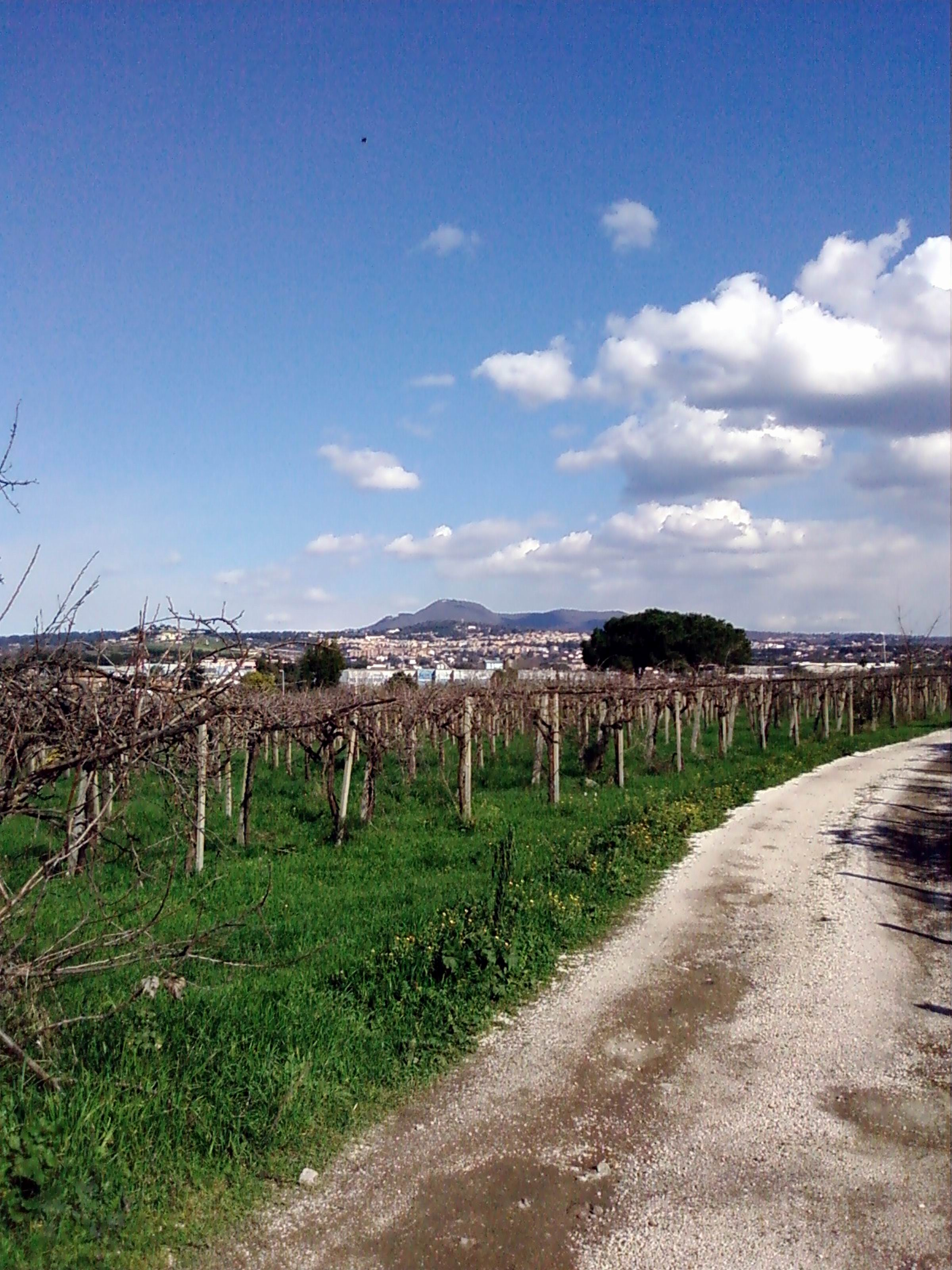
Vineyard near Albano Laziale.

Albano's economy is historically linked to wine production, active primary importance in an area such as the Alban Hills known for its wines since Roman times as the Castelli name of Albanum.

In 1995, at the Albano wholesale vegetable market sold 127,060 tons of vegetables (cabbage, broccoli, cauliflower, potatoes, onions, pomdori and salads) and 1932 tons of domestically sourced from abroad. Also 326,957 tons artichokes were sold, while 84,747 tons of fresh fruits (apples, pears, peaches, grapes) and 14,831 tons were sold, and finally 43,073 tons citrus fruits were sold.

=== Industry ===
In 1995 the local units of industry in the town of Albano was 475, one of the ten most massive concentration of industrial activity in the southern quadrant of the Metropolitan City of Rome. There are no mining of minerals in the territory Albanense, but in Roman times, peperino was mined and known as lapis Albanus, since this particular type of stone is found mainly on the shores of Lake Albano. Despite the historic city of Albano situated on a flow of lava stone, the extraction of this stone has never been a thriving, unlike what happened in neighbouring Ariccia and Marino.

Finally, companies that operate in the construction industry were 209: this sector given the large urban expansion in Albano in recent decades has been steadily growing, as demonstrated by the data on the licensing of builders.

=== Services ===
The town of Albano Laziale is historically subject to a difficult situation in terms of water supply: the lack of important sources of water has forced the municipality since the 17th century to use water from the nearby territories Ariccia and Nemi. In recent management of water supply was the responsibility of the municipality of Albano Laziale, who in 1994 made it known that on a global consumption of 137 litres of water per second, 102 were from wells located within the municipal area, 6 from source of Nemi and 29 by the water of the Consortium of Simbrivio the following year, water consumption had risen to 146 litres per second and the extraction wells was increased to 116 litres. Since 2008 the water service is managed by the municipal company of the City of Rome.

=== Tourism ===
Albano has considerable tourism potential, which have been stepped up in recent years, due to the archaeological Castra Albana, the natural beauty of the Colle dei Cappuccini and the shores of Lake Albano.

== Sports ==
The soccer team the city has historically Alba Longa, which after merging with other teams in Albalonga Pol was able to land in Series D Since 2001 the Alba Longa, colours are white and blue.

There is also a town representative in soccer 5, Albalonga Football 5. Albano is represented in volleyball by the Albalonga Volleyball Club. In terms of basketball, Albano's Albano Basketball Club team militates in Series D.

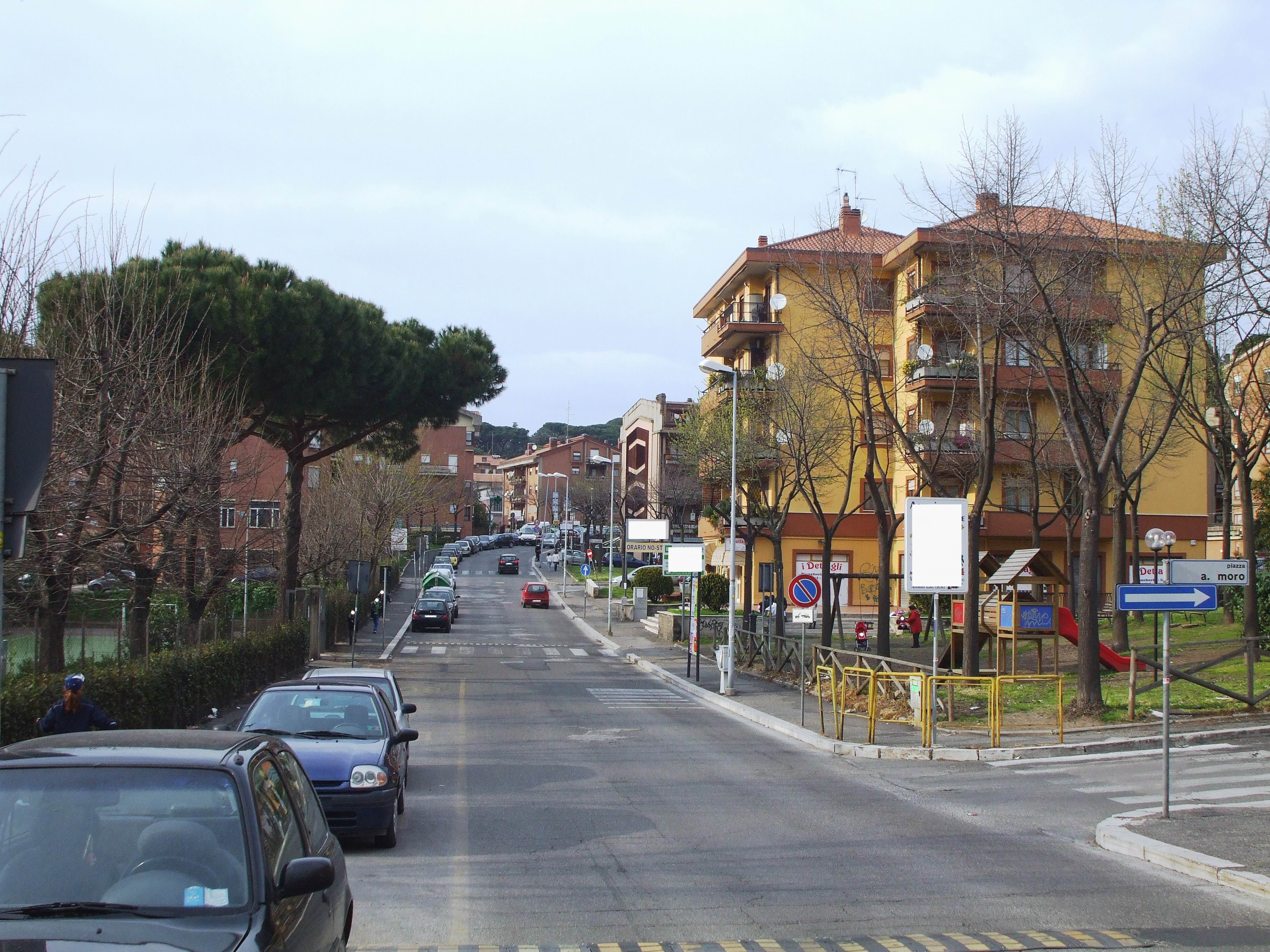
Near the sporting complex on Via Rossini

In fencing, the town of Albano has its own representation. Besides the Institute equal Leonardo Murialdo school's fencing, the village of Cecchina is active in the local school of fencing, and is currently at the design stage of the formation of Cecchina S. S. Dodge.

=== Sport facilities ===
- Stadio Comunale Pius XII (Albano center)
- Stadio Comunale di Via Hungary (Cecchina)
- Palestra Comunale di Via Rossini (Albano center)
- Centro Sportivo di Villa Doria (Albano centro)
- Palestra "A.Gramsci" dell'Istituto Comprensivo Scolastico di Pavona – Via Pescara (Pavona di Albano Laziale)
- Palestra Terme Domiziane – Via Legione Partica

== Transport ==
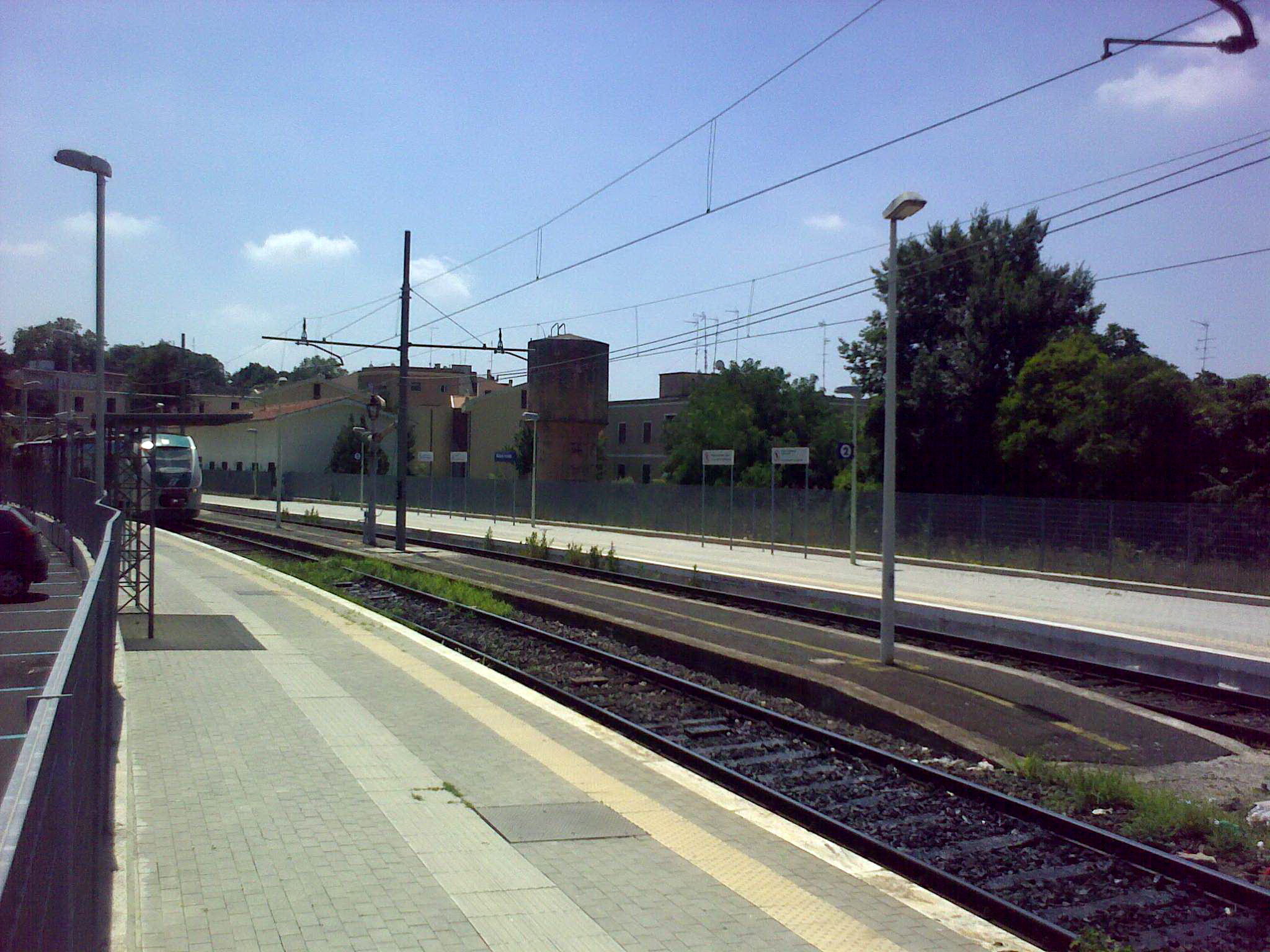
Albano Laziale Train Station.

Public transport is provided by the region's COTRAL bus lines, with regular bus connections to and from Rome. There is nearby train service directly to Stazione di Roma Termini from Albano Laziale.

== Twin towns ==
- Białogard, Poland, since 2004
- Koszalin, Poland, since 2004
- Alytus, Lithuania, since 2004
- Savelli, Italy
- Teterow, Germany

== Notable people ==
- Piero Taruffi (1906-1988), racing driver

== See also ==
- History of Rome
- Bishop of Albano
- Alban Hills
- Cecchina
- Pavona
- Pamphilj Palace (Albano)
