= Roman amphitheatre of Albano Laziale =

Ancient Roman amphitheater in Albano Laziale, Italy

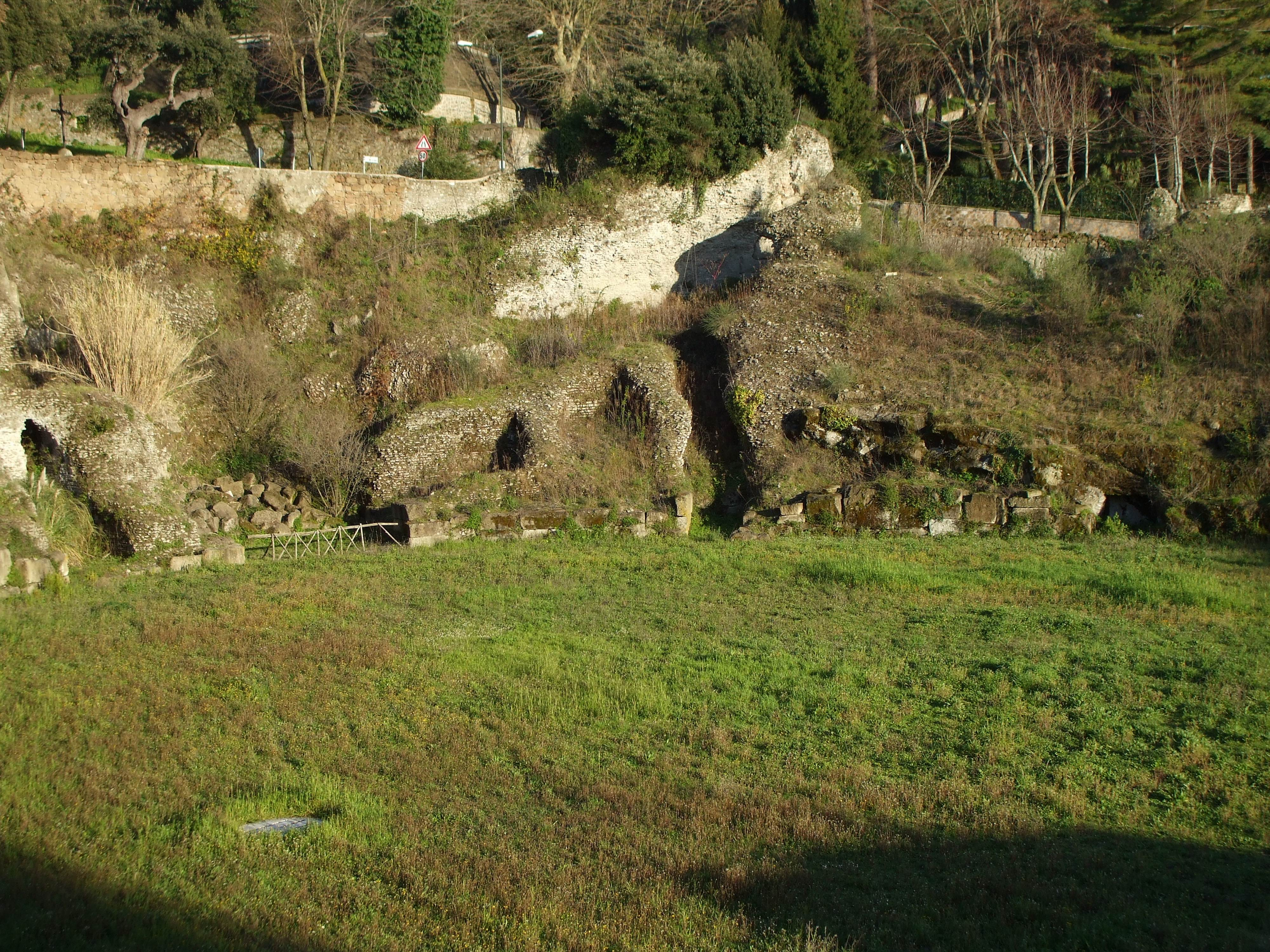
Roman amphitheatre of Albano Laziale

The Roman amphitheatre of Albano Laziale is a Roman amphitheatre located in Albano Laziale, Lazio.

The amphitheatre was built for the nearby Castra Albana, the fortress of the Legio II Parthica founded by the emperor Septimius Severus (193-211); however, the amphitheatre was built later than the fortress around the middle of the 3rd century. Its capacity was at least 15,000 and its maximum length 113 m.

== Description ==
=== The superstructure terrace ===
The amphitheatre stands on a slope: to reinforce the platform on which it was built, a terrace had to be constructed, 6.75 m high and 59.6 m long, running parallel to the amphitheatre's perimeter to the west at an average distance of 23 m. The terrace wall, adorned with fourteen niches positioned 2.1 m above the ground, is built with irregular layers of peperino ashlars and bricks.

=== The "vomitoria" ===
The two main entrances (Vomitoria) were, unusually, not aligned with the major axis of the arena because of the rugged terrain.

==== Western "Vomitorium" ====
This vomitorium, shifted slightly from the major axis of the arena, was largely carved into the solid rock of peperino, to a height of about 2.5 m. The rest was constructed with opus quadratum in the same volcanic stone. Only the first section of the vomitorium, approximately 6.5 m wide, was covered by a barrel vault for a length of 11.5 m. In the second section, two staircases, each 1.7 m wide, provided access to the seating. The entrance is partly closed by a partition, probably added later, and partly open but originally closed by a gate, the hinges of which are still visible. In the floor of the vomitorium, there is a rectangular pit containing a low medieval Christian burial, dating to the period when the amphitheatre was partially converted into a Christian oratory.

==== Eastern "Vomitorium" ====
This vomitorium also has an unusual rectangular shape, allowing the entrance to align with the major axis of the arena. Archaeologist Giuseppe Lugli praised the architect's skill in solving this issue. The first section, aligned with the major axis of the arena, is 6.35 m long and 4.7 m wide, while the second section, perpendicular to the major axis of the arena and forming a right angle with the first, is 30 m long and exits outside the amphitheatre. Like the western vomitorium, part of the structure is carved into the peperino rock, while part is constructed with opus quadratum in the same stone.

=== The Arena ===
The major axis of the ellipse formed by the arena measured 67.5 m, while the minor axis measured 45 m, resulting in a total area of around 2500 m^{2}. The first excavation campaign of 1912-1914 uncovered the entire southern hemisphere of the arena, which was founded on the solid rock of peperino. Around the entire ellipse, there is a drainage channel, approximately 0.35 m wide, which discharged water into a channel originally covered by removable wooden boards, 1.2 m wide and 3 m deep. This larger channel then emptied into an underground chamber near the pulvinar. During the second excavation campaign of 1919-1920, it was discovered that the water flowed into another channel beyond the superstructure terrace. However, traces of this latter channel were lost beyond the boundary of the property of the episcopal seminary. The aforementioned 3-meter-deep channel had a dual purpose: to drain water and to provide access for those arranging the stage equipment, who would then emerge in the center of the arena. The arena's enclosing wall has been preserved to a maximum height of 2.5 m. However, it is likely, based on some discovered blocks, that it originally extended higher with a curved overhang.

=== The "Cavea" ===
The cavea and seating have largely been lost due to the stripping of the monument following the Roman era. However, it is believed that the seating was divided into two sections, the maenianum primum and the maenianum secundum, each further divided into lower and upper sectors. From the remains of stairs found in the superstructure arches, it is hypothesized that one stairway every three arches provided access between the lower and upper levels.

Regarding the number of seating rows, Leon Battista Alberti calculated 30, a number still considered plausible today. Archaeologist Giuseppe Lugli also estimated that the amphitheatre could accommodate a maximum of about 16,000 spectators (14,850 seated), assuming each seat was 0.44 meters wide, as in the Colosseum in Rome, and considering that the cavea rises about 30 m with a base of 23.5 m and an incline of 27 degrees.

=== The "Pulvinar" ===
The pulvinar was the imperial box, equivalent to the "authorities' tribune" in our larger stadiums. It was originally located at the center of the seating semi-circle, on the southern side. Access was initially through fornix XIII of the first order, measuring 23 m long and 3 m wide, via two double-ramped staircases that led to either side of the platform. However, this access was later abandoned in favor of the nearby fornix XIV, probably due to the closure of the two staircases, allowing the pulvinar's surface area to triple. The entrance to this fornix is marked by two semi-columns in brick with Attic bases in peperino. The width is also less than the previous fornix (from a maximum of 2.4 m to a minimum of 1.97 m).

=== The Arches ===
Due to the particularly challenging terrain, the builders chose to support the seating with a series of arches. Archaeologist Giuseppe Lugli commented on these structures:

"At first sight, the great irregularity that exists among them in shape and size is striking, not explained by particular conditions of the terrain. We cannot account for this except by rethinking the hasty construction and the lack of an elaborate and precise design."

The maximum length of the interior rooms within the arches, arranged on two levels, ranges from 22 to 23 m, while the width varies between 2 and 4.5 m. Additionally, each arch has a different roof, floor level, and foundation offset, leading Lugli to describe these constructions as "peculiar."

Each of the rooms in the arches had its own function: for example, fornices VI and VII were likely where animals were kept for performances; fornix IX was a storage room, fornix XVI a storeroom, fornices V, VIII, XII, XVII, and XX served as stairwells to the second level, fornices XIII and XIV as access to the pulvinar. In some fornices (VII and VIII), there are medieval Christian burials, while in others, it was not possible to clear the fill material due to the precariousness of the walls.

Around the circumference of the amphitheatre, at least on the southern side, there was a paved road, which probably then reached the Appian Way, following the current Via dell'Anfiteatro Romano to Piazza Giuseppe Mazzini. A second road likely led to Domitian's Villa at Castel Gandolfo, following the current "galleria di sopra," based on Roman cobblestones found in 1917 and 1921 near the church of Santa Maria Assunta and the adjacent Collegio di Propaganda Fide at Castel Gandolfo, in the extraterritorial area of the Pontifical Villa of Castel Gandolfo.
