= Cesarini =

Coat of arms of Cesarini noble family

Cesarini is an Italian surname and the name of an Italian noble family. Notable people mostly include members of the noble Cesarini family, who held various ecclesiastical titles.

== Notable members ==
- Alessandro Cesarini (died 1542), Italian cardinal
- Alessandro Cesarini (footballer) (born 1989), Italian footballer
- Alessandro Cesarini (iuniore) (1592–1644), Italian Roman Catholic bishop
- Carlo Francesco Cesarini (c. 1666–1741), Italian classical composer and violinist
- Claudia Cesarini (born 1986), Italian modern pentathlete
- David Cesarini, American economist
- Davide Cesarini (born 1995), Sammarinese footballer
- Ferdinando Cesarini (1604–1646), Italian poet and physicist
- Filippo Cesarini (1610–1683), Italian Roman Catholic bishop
- Giuliano Cesarini, iuniore (1466–1510), Italian cardinal
- Julian Cesarini (1398–1444), Italian cardinal
- Letizia Cesarini (born 1987), know professionally as Maria Antonietta, Italian singer-songwriter
- Nino Cesarini (1889–1943), Italian model
- Renato Cesarini (1906–1969), Italian Argentine footballer and manager
- Virginio Cesarini (1595–1624), Italian poet and intellectual
- Giovanni Andrea Cesarini. He married Girolama Borgia, an Illegittime daughter of Pope Alexander VI

== See also ==
- Cesarini v. United States, a United States district court case
- Ceserani
