= Niccolò Riccardi =

Italian Dominican theologian

Niccolò Riccardi (born at Genoa, 1585; died at Rome, 30 May 1639) was an Italian Dominican theologian, writer and preacher, known today mostly for his role in the Galileo affair.

== Life ==
Physically he was unprepossessing, but he was encouraged by his parents who sent him to study with Tomas de Lemos (1545–1629) at University of Valladolid. He entered the Dominican Order and was invested with its habit in the Convent of St. Paul, where he studied philosophy and theology. After completing his studies he was made a professor of Thomistic theology at Pincia. While discharging his academic duties, he acquired a reputation as a preacher: Philip III of Spain named him "padre Mostro" ("The Marvel-Priest" or "the Monster-Priest"), a sobriquet by which he was subsequently known in Spain and at Rome. Whether this was due to his prodigious learning and culture, or to his obesity, is not certain.

In Rome from 1621, he acquired the confidence of Pope Urban VIII. He was made regent of studies and professor of theology at the College of St. Thomas, the future Pontifical University of Saint Thomas Aquinas, Angelicum. On 13 January 1622 he was also made consultant to the Congregation of the Index.

Under Pope Urban VIII Riccardi's prestige as a man of culture continued to grow. He took part in the activities of the Accademia degli Umoristi and both Giovanni Andrea Rovetti and Marcello Giovanetti dedicated collections of sonnets to him, in 1625 and 1626 respectively. His literary activities overlapped significantly with his church responsibilities; In 1622 he was in charge of revising Tommaso Stigliani's Canzoniero to pass censorship, and in 1626 he was chosen to supervise the corrections to Giambattista Marino's Adone, which the Accademia degli Umoristi wanted to publish. After rejecting this censored version for printing, he worked on a further revised version in 1628 and 1629, collaborating with Roberto Ubaldini, but this work was apparently never finished.

Virginio Cesarini tried to arrange a meeting between him and Galileo, but although he enthusiastically endorsed "Il Saggiatore" for publication in 1623, he only met Galileo for the first time in May 1624. The two men corresponded thereafter – although no direct trace of their letters to each other remains, Galileo's surviving letters to Mario Guiducci and Giovanni Faber, include pleas to them to ask Riccardi to reply to him.

In 1629 Urban VIII appointed him Master of the Sacred Palace to succeed Niccolò Ridolfi, recently elected Master General of the Dominicans. Shortly after this, the same pontiff appointed him pontifical preacher. Following these promotions he gave up his literary interests to concentrate on liturgical and historic matters. He began the research for his history of the Council of Trent, of which there remains today only a synopsis and some notes. Between 1629 and 1631 he thought of k part in the Congregatn for the reform of the breviary. In 1635 he joined the newly founded Accademia Basiliana, which explored links with the Greek church, and joined the Congregatio super Correctione euchologii Graecorum, which issued revised texts for the Melkite Greek Catholic Church. In 1638 he joined the congregation charged with drafting an authorised version of the Holy Scriptures in Arabic.

== Dispute with Tommaso Campanella ==
Riccardi maintained generally amiable relationships with the authors whose work he had to revise before the Church would authorise their publication; an exception was with fellow-Dominican Tommaso Campanella. Campanella was a man of outspoken heterodox beliefs; denounced to the Inquisition, he was arrested in Padua in 1594 and cited before the Holy Office in Rome, he was confined in a convent until 1597. He was soon in prison again, this time for rebellion against Philip IV of Spain, King of Naples, where he remained for twenty-seven years until the personal intercession of Pope Urban VIII had him released. He was brought to Rome in 1626, where he became Urban VIII's consultant on astrology.

Riccardi first came into contact with Campanella's work in 1621, when he was called on to examine, with several other consultants, Atheismus triumphatus. The work was ostensibly an account of Campanella's personal journey from rationalism to sincere Christian belief, but the Church considered the arguments he put forward for atheism – before then refuting them – to be strongly persuasive. The Church thus feared that the work in fact promoted heresy while appearing to argue for orthodoxy. Permission to print was denied.

When Campanella came to Rome several years later, he renewed his attempt to have the work printed. Riccardi was once again called on to work with others to review the manuscript, and again their response was negative. This time however Urban VIII intervened personally and ensured that Atheismus Triumphatus, together with Campanella's other works, were authorised for printing. Riccardi continued to work on revisions, but there were more delays before the work finally appeared in 1631, whereupon it was immediately seized and banned. Campanella now embarked on a campaign of vengeance against Riccardi, accusing him of being the cause of all the delays in publishing; exiled to France, he continued his harassment from there, writing directly to the Pope and to other people of influence, making ever wilder accusations about Riccardi for several years. There is no evidence that anyone took his claims seriously, but Riccardi could do nothing but refuse to release the manuscripts Campanella had entrusted to him.

== Galileo’s Dialogue ==
Between 1630 and 1633 Riccardi became involved in a major controversy involving Galileo Galilei. After Il Saggiatore in 1623, Galileo had not published any further work, and had particularly avoided the controversy around the ideas of Copernicus, about which he had been warned by Cardinal Bellarmine in 1616.

In 1630 Giovanni Ciampoli, the Pope's secretary, wrote to Galileo, sending the compliments of Riccardi, recently appointed Master of the Sacred Palace, who now had authority over licensing books for printing. As Riccardi had endorsed Il Saggiatore for publication a few years previously, this seemed a positive sign that new opportunities to publish his ideas would become available to Galileo. Benedetto Castelli informed Riccardi that it was his appointment that had inspired Galileo to resume writing – which, given the size and complexity of the Dialogue was certainly not true. Riccardi responded to this piece of flattery with an assurance that Galileo could always count on him, which Castelli then reported back to Galileo in a letter on 9 February 1630 as a general assurance of Riccardi's support.

Galileo finished his manuscript of the Dialogue, came to Rome on 3 May 1630, and presented it to Urban himself. Urban may not have read much of it, but he crossed out Galileo's working title, “De Fluxu et Refluxu Maris” on the grounds that it did not properly reflect the main purpose of the work – a comparison of the world-views of Ptolemy and Copernicus. Besides requiring a new title, Urban reiterated that the subject was to be treated only hypothetically, and that his own favoured argument about God's infinite capacity to organise the universe any way he liked must be inserted at the end. He passed the manuscript to Riccardi for review, Galileo accepted the Pope's conditions, and the manuscript was approved by Riccardi after only a few alterations had been made by his assistant.

Galileo then left Rome and returned to Florence, whereupon his plans took a turn for the worse. The founder of the Accademia dei Lincei, Prince Cesi, died, meaning Galileo no longer had a patron to cover the cost of publication. At the same time, an outbreak of the plague in Florence meant that Galileo could not longer send manuscripts to Rome for review. Instead, he decided to publish in Florence. Riccardi wrote that he nevertheless expected Galileo to make the agreed amendments, after which a licence to publish in Florence or elsewhere could be issued.

Riccardi now began to vacillate. He knew that the Pope himself had encouraged Galileo to write his work, albeit within certain specified limits. Giovanni Ciampoli favoured publication. Riccardi's cousin was the wife of the Tuscan ambassador in Rome, and the Medici court certainly wanted the book published. At the same time, the Church's 1616 ruling against Copernicanism meant that anything that appeared to argue for it was problematic, and the Jesuit order was determined to oppose Galileo in every way. Uncertain how to proceed, Riccardi delayed for months. Eventually, in March 1631, he agreed that the Dialogue could be published, on condition that he retained the manuscript. As soon as he had finished reading and correcting each page, he would send it to the printer. He still insisted that Galileo would have to rewrite the preface and the conclusion to bring them into line with the Pope's views.

In March 1631, Riccardi proposed that instead of Galileo sending him the entire manuscript – impossible because of the risk of it carrying the plague – he should send only the revised preface and conclusion, and the rest would be reviewed by the church authorities in Florence. Eventually the Tuscan ambassador's wife, his cousin, was able to broker an arrangement in April 1631 whereby Riccardi agreed to issue a licence to print, subject to certain written conditions. Eventually, after more angry correspondence from Galileo. Riccardi wrote to Clemente Egidi, the Inquisitor of Florence, summarising the process so far from his point of view, and granting him authority to proceed – either to publish or not – as he thought best, thereby effectively washing his hands of the matter.

The printing of the Dialogue was underway in July 1631 and was complete by February 1632. Copies reached Rome in May. At the end of July Riccardi instructed Egidi to collect every copy of the work in Florence, while he set to work gathering all the copies distributed in Rome. Within weeks a Congregation had been formed to examine how the book had ever received a licence to be printed. Riccardi claimed that the only reason he had agreed to this was that Ciampoli had handed him a letter from the Pope commanding him to do (the implication being that Ciampoli had forged it).

Urban VIII was furious with Galileo and Ciampoli, but apparently accepted that Riccardi had acted in good faith. Galileo was made to stand trial, Ciampoli was dismissed, but Riccardi managed to hold on to his position.

== Death ==
Riccardi died of a stroke in Rome on 30 May 1639 and was buried in the church of Santa Maria sopra Minerva. The funeral oration was delivered by Melchior Inchofer, member of the commission revising Galileo's Dialogue.

== Works ==
His extant works number twenty. Besides several volumes of sermons for Advent, Lent, and special occasions, his writings treat of Scripture, theology, and history. One of his best-known works is the "History of the Council of Trent" (Rome, 1627). His commentaries treat of all the books of Scripture; two other commentaries treat of the Lord's Prayer and the Canticle of Canticles.
