= Riccardi =

Riccardi is an Italian surname. Notable people with the surname include:

- Alessio Riccardi (born 2001), Italian footballer
- Andrea Riccardi (born 1950), Italian church leader
- Arturo Riccardi (1878–1966), Italian admiral
- Davide Riccardi (rower) (born 1986), Italian rower
- Franco Riccardi (1905–1968), Italian fencer
- Giulio Cesare Riccardi (died 1602), Italian Catholic archbishop
- Jake Riccardi (born 1999), Australian footballer
- Luigi Riccardi (1807–1877), Italian painter
- Marco Riccardi (born 1982), Argentine field hockey player
- Marcos Riccardi (born 1982), Argentinian field hockey player
- Marino Riccardi (born 1958), San Marino politician
- Michael Riccardi (born 1963), American attempted killer of Al Sharpton
- Niccolò Riccardi (1585–1636), Italian Dominican theologian and preacher, involved in the Galileo affair
- Peter Riccardi (born 1972), Australian footballer
- Romain Riccardi (born 1988), Italian BMX rider
- Tommaso Riccardi (1844–1915), Italian Catholic priest

Other

- Atletica Riccardi, Italian athletics club based in Milan
