= Gian Vittorio Rossi =

Italian poet, philologist, and historian

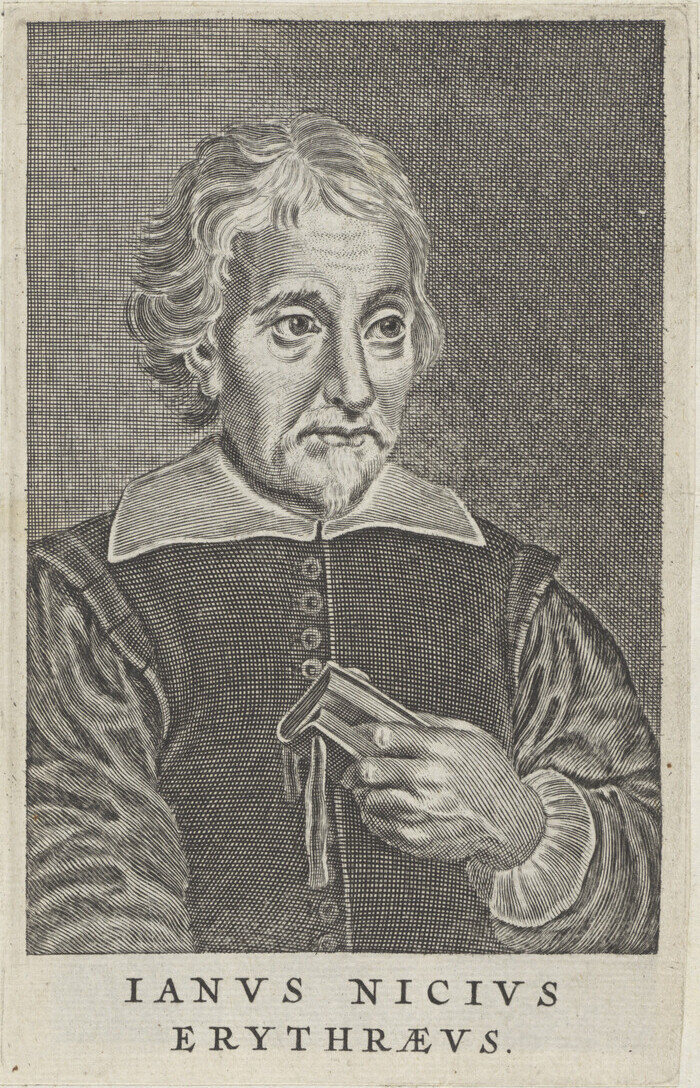
- Gian Vittorio Rossi
- Born: 1577; Rome, Papal States
- Died: 13 November 1647 (aged 69–70); Rome, Papal States
- Education: Roman College
- Occupations: poet, philologist, and historian
- Writing career
- Language: Latin
- Notable works: Pinacotheca imaginum illustrium (1643-1648); Eudemiae libri decem (1645)
- Movement: Baroque

Gian Vittorio Rossi, also known as Giano Nicio Eritreo (1577 – 13 November 1647), was an Italian poet, philologist, and historian.

== Life and works ==
Rossi was born in Rome to a well-to-do family and lived his entire life in the city of his birth. He was educated by the Jesuits at the Collegio Romano, where he was a pupil of Bernardino Stefonio, Orazio Torsellino and Francesco Benci, the latter a student of the French humanist Muretus, one of the greatest Latinists of the Renaissance. Rossi soon distinguishing himself by his extraordinary command of Latin. At the age of 19 he received his laurea in jurisprudence at La Sapienza and in 1603 became a member of the Accademia degli Umoristi. The subsequent misfortunes of his family forced him to enter the legal profession. He remained in a precarious financial position until he received an appointment as secretary to Cardinal Andrea Baroni Peretti Montalto in 1610. After the cardinal's death in 1628 Rossi retired to a small house on the Gianicolo in Rome which became the centre for a circle of his fellow intellectuals including Alessandro Tassoni, Giovanni Ciampoli, Leone Allacci, Gabriel Naudé, and Fabio Chigi (the future Pope Alexander VII, whom Rossi called "Tyrrhenus). The image of Rossi that emerges from writings about him and from his own works is that of a cultured man, a meticulous philologist, and a tolerant thinker. His principal work, Pinacotheca Imaginum Illustrium containing three hundred short biographies of his contemporaries, both men and women, was one of the earliest examples of an Italian literary history, a genre which was to be developed in the 18th century by Ludovico Muratori and Girolamo Tiraboschi.

== Works ==
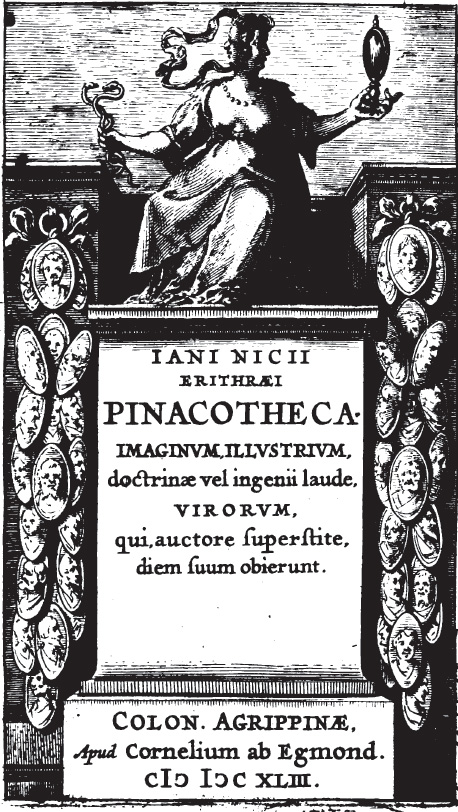
Frontispiece of Rossi's principal work, Pinacotheca Imaginum Illustrium

- Dialogi: Convivium villae Syrorum; Quid in scriptore historiae requiretur; De tolerantia malorum, Parisiis : apud Iacobum Villery, in palatio sub porticu Delphinali, 1643
- Pinacotheca imaginum illustrium, doctrinae el ingenii laude, virorum, qui, auctore superstite, diemv suum obierunt, Coloniae Vbiorum : apud Iodocum Kalcovium & socios, (3 volumes) 1643-1648;
- Documenta sacra : Ex Euangeliis quae dominicis per annum & nonnullis aliis festis diebus leguntur in ecclesia, Coloniae Ubiorum : apud Iodocum Kalcovium & socios, 1645
- Eudemiae libri decem, Coloniae Vbiorum i.e. Leida : apud Iodocum Kalcouium & socios, 1645
- Exempla virtutum et vitiorum, Coloniae Vbiorum, i.e. Amsterdam : apud Iodocum Kalcovium et socios, 1645
- Opuscola spiritualia tria; I. Supplex libellus ad deum & B.V. matrem. II. Paradoxa christiana. III. Sermones de quatuor nouissimis, Coloniae Vbiorum : apud Iodocum Kalcouium & socios, 1648
- Dialogi septendecim, Coloniae Vbiorum i.e. Amsterdam : apud Iodocum Kalcouium & socios, (2 volumes) 1645-1649
- Epistolae ad diversos, Coloniae Vbiorum i.e. Amsterdam : apud Iodocum Kalcovium & socios, 1645-1649
- Orationes viginti duae, Coloniae Ubiorum : apud Iodocum Kalcovivum & Socios, 1649
- Epistolae ad tyrrhenum et ad diversos notis illustratae indice necessario auctoris vita et epistola priore editione haud comprehensa auctiores ac emendatiores editae a Io. Christiano Fischero..., Coloniae ubiorum : apud Iodocum Kalcovium, 1738

=== Works in English translation ===
Gian Vittorio Rossi's Eudemiae Libri Decem. Edited and Translated with an Introduction and Notes by Jennifer K. Nelson. Tübingen: Narr Francke Attempto Verlag. 2021. ISBN 978-3823302643.

== Sources ==
- Aikin, John (1813). "Rossi, Gian-Vittorio" in General biography: or, Lives, critical and historical, of the most eminent persons of all ages, countries, conditions, and professions,, Vol. 8, pp. 626–627. G. G. and J. Robinson.
- Gerboni, Luigi (1899). Un umanista nel Secento: Giano Nicio Eritreo (in Italian). Città di Castello: Lapi.
- Fassò, Luigi (1936). "ROSSI, Gian Vittorio". Enciclopedia Italiana (in Italian). Rome: Istituto dell'Enciclopedia Italiana.
- Doglio, Maria Luisa (1973). "Rossi, Gian Vittorio, detto Giano Nicio Eritreo (1577-1647)". In Vittore Branca (ed.). Dizionario critico della Letteratura Italiana (in Italian). Vol. 3. Turin: UTET. pp. 252–253.
- Bertoldi, Paola (2002). "Rossi, Gian Vittorio". The Oxford Companion to Italian Literature. Oxford University Press.
