= Pamphilj Palace (Albano) =

Building in Albano Laziale, Italy

Coordinates: 41°43′54″N 12°39′41″E

- Palazzo Pamphilj
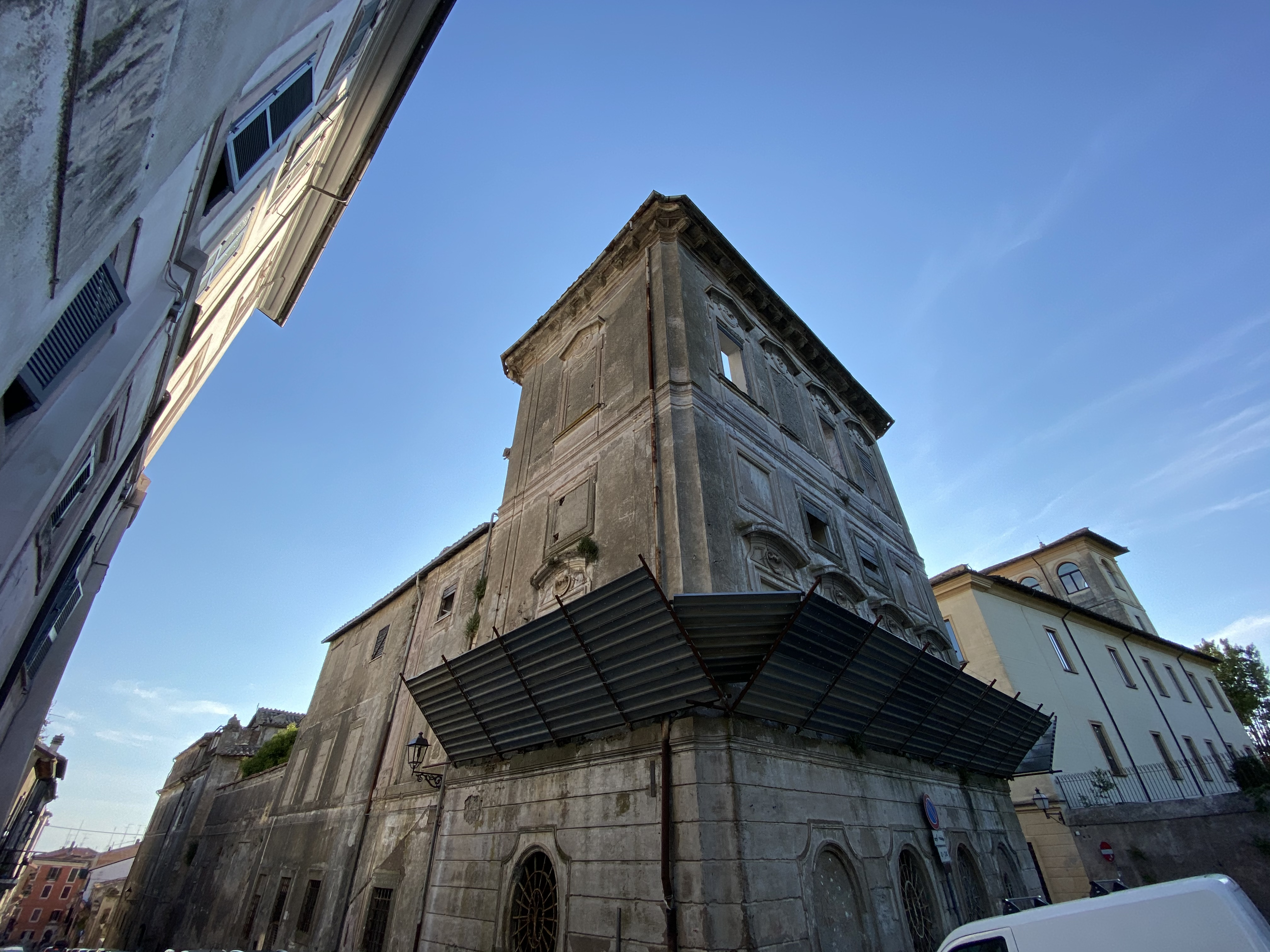
- View of the side of the building from the side of Via San Gaspare del Bufalo (June 2020).

General information
- Status: Abandoned, in urgent need of renovation and restoration
- Architectural style: Rococo
- Town or city: Albano Laziale, Lazio
- Country: Italy
- Year(s) built: 1708-1717

Technical details
- Floor count: 4

Design and construction
- Architect(s): Filippo Leti, Simone Costanzi, Carlo Stefano Fontana
- Main contractor: Benedetto Pamphilj

Palazzo Pamphilj (or del Collegio Nazareno) is a historical palace in the city of Albano Laziale, in the province of Rome, in the Roman Castles area.

The palace was built between 1708 and 1717 by Cardinal Benedetto Pamphilj to replace some country houses dating back to the second half of the 17th century located at the top of the trident of Albano, a new urban expansion of the city conceived in the mid-17th century by Cardinal Fabrizio Savelli, commendatory abbot of the church of San Paolo. The palace became the property of the Piarist fathers of Rome's Nazarene College in 1764. It was used as a summer residence for the college's students until 1944, when it was requisitioned for use as a shelter for 52 war-displaced families.

It is currently a private property and is in total disrepair and neglect, despite being cited as an illustrative example of a patrician building in the Alban Hills and an 18th-century reconstruction site in a detailed study by Marco Silvestri and Enzo D'Ambrosio for the Accademia degli Incolti in 1988.

== History ==
=== The "trident" and early 17th century urbanization ===
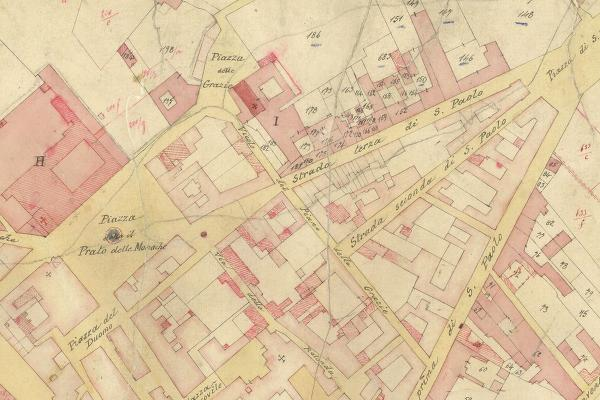
The "trident" of Albano in the Gregorian Cadastre (1835).

The realization of the trident of Albano as a set of three straight roads converging at a single point was promoted by Cardinal Paolo Savelli, commendatory abbot of St. Paul's Abbey, taking advantage of the lands owned by the abbey. As early as 1282, Cardinal Giacomo Savelli, since 1285 Pope Honorius IV, had built the abbey complex of St. Paul's, endowing it with substantial properties in the Albanese territory and around Lake Albano (such as the picturesque hermitage of Sant'Angelo in Lacu). The trident of roads was articulated as an urbanistic expansion of the city, hitherto restricted horizontally along the route of the decayed Via Appia Antica, which grafted onto today's Corso Alcide de Gasperi and developed with three roads that connected the strategic points of the city to the Abbey of St. Paul: the current Via Leonardo Murialdo (the "third street" of the Gregorian cadastre) with the cathedral basilica of San Pancrazio, the current Via San Gaspare del Bufalo (the "second street" of the Gregorian cadastre) with the shrine of Santa Maria della Rotonda, and the current Via Aurelio Saffi (the "first street" of the Gregorian cadastre) with the Via Appia and, slightly wrong-footing it, with Palazzo Savelli. The first building erected in the new expansion (the "Borgo Nuovo," today's Borgo San Paolo) was a country house built by Cardinal Vincenzo Maculani, a Dominican military engineer in papal service, between 1657 and 1662. The annual rent he had to pay to the Abbey of San Paolo, owner of the land, amounted to two pounds of wax (about 600 grams). Next to this palace, built at the corner of the square and today's Via Murialdo and Via San Gaspare del Bufalo, on the downstream side rose the country house of the Bottini marquises.

Later, the "trident" was occupied by new aristocratic palaces: Rospigliosi palace, built in 1667 opposite the Maculani casino (today it houses the "Leonardo Murialdo" paritarian institute and the Giuseppini fathers' college) and the Nuñex casino on Piazza San Paolo, the palace of Cardinal Bernardino Giraud (1721-1782) and the neoclassical Croci palace on today's Via Aurelio Saffi.

=== 18th century: the Pamphilj ===
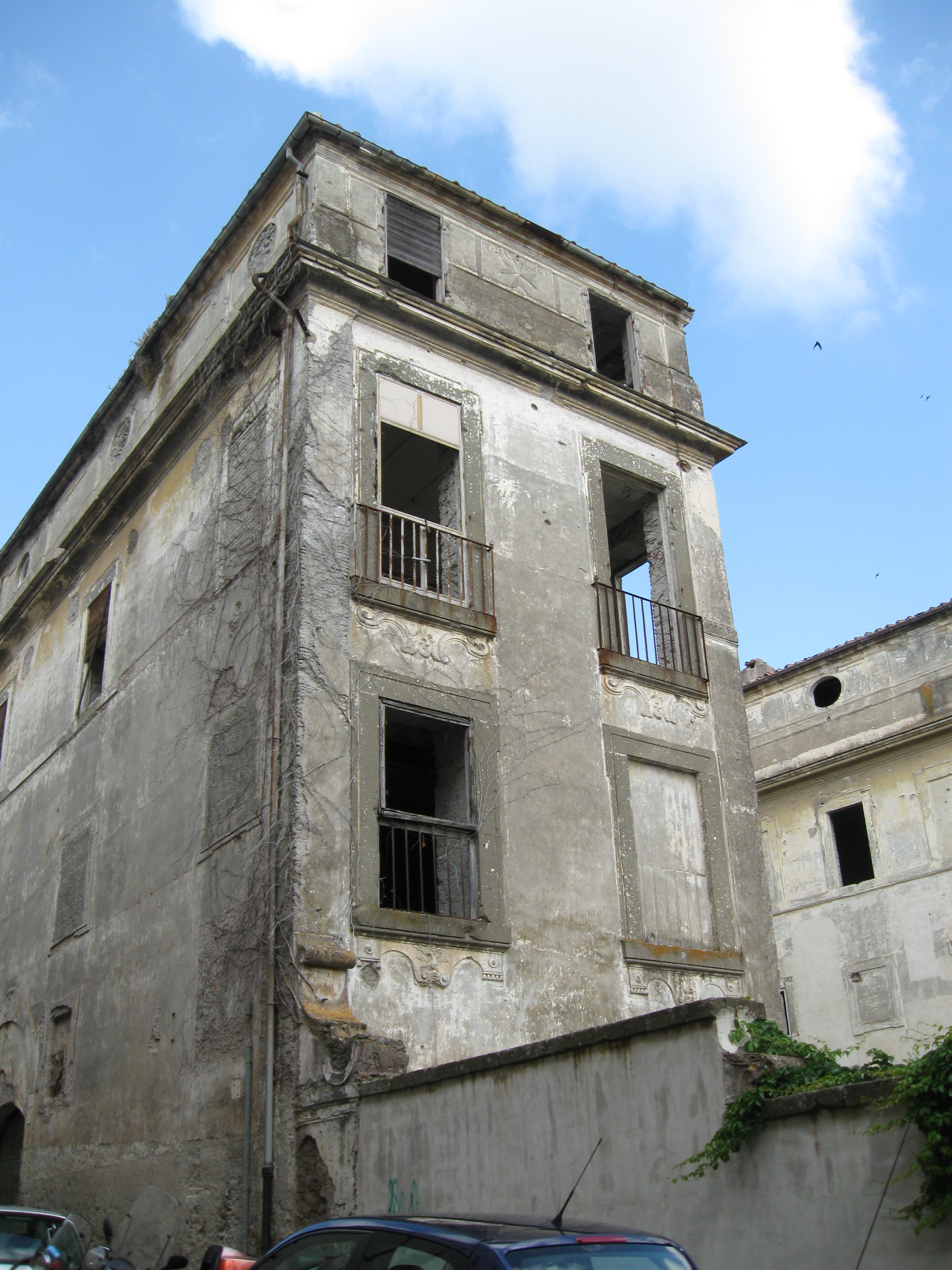
The wing of the palace facing Leonardo Murialdo Street (June 2009).

On Dec. 6, 1707, Cardinal Benedetto Pamphilj, a patron, librettist and librarian of the Vatican Library, sent the architect Filippo Leti to Albano to make an estimate of the value of the Maculani casino and also of the adjacent Bottini casino, as he was intent on purchasing them to build a new palace.

The Maculani casino, a two-story building with a courtyard, chapel, stable and dining room, was in a very bad state, unfinished and far too rustic, with the putlog holes still visible.

The adjacent Bottini casino, on the other hand, though much smaller, was more finished, and still counted two floors with courtyard, dinette, stable and chapel.

The final estimation was 3000 pontifical scudi for the Maculani casino and 1500 for the Bottini casino: the purchase of the two properties was sealed in Rome, at the Doria Pamphilj palace, on January 30 and 31, 1708. Later, Cardinal Pamphilj also purchased an undivided property of the extent of 113 square meters, belonging to Maddalena Ubaldi, located along today's Via Murialdo, bordering his new properties: the purchase was concluded on March 26, 1708.

The construction of the palace was begun by the architect Simone Costanzi, who, however, died in the course of the work in 1709, so the construction was followed by Filippo Leti under the supervision of master builder De Rossi.

Another participation in the design and embellishment of the palace was that of the architect and painter Domenico Paradisi, who between 1709 and 1712 worked on the decoration of the palace's representative interiors: in addition to him, the pictorial decoration was carried out by the painter Macci, director of the works, and the painter Severino Lucentin, who was responsible for the decoration of the flight of rooms on the main floor.

If in 1712 the front of the palace on Piazza San Paolo was probably completed, between July and September 1717 the factory was expanded with Cardinal Pamphilj's purchase of the house of brothers Domenico and Matteo Giannini, adjacent to his property and facing the present Via San Gaspare del Bufalo: in this space the courtyard "of the cavallerizza" was built.

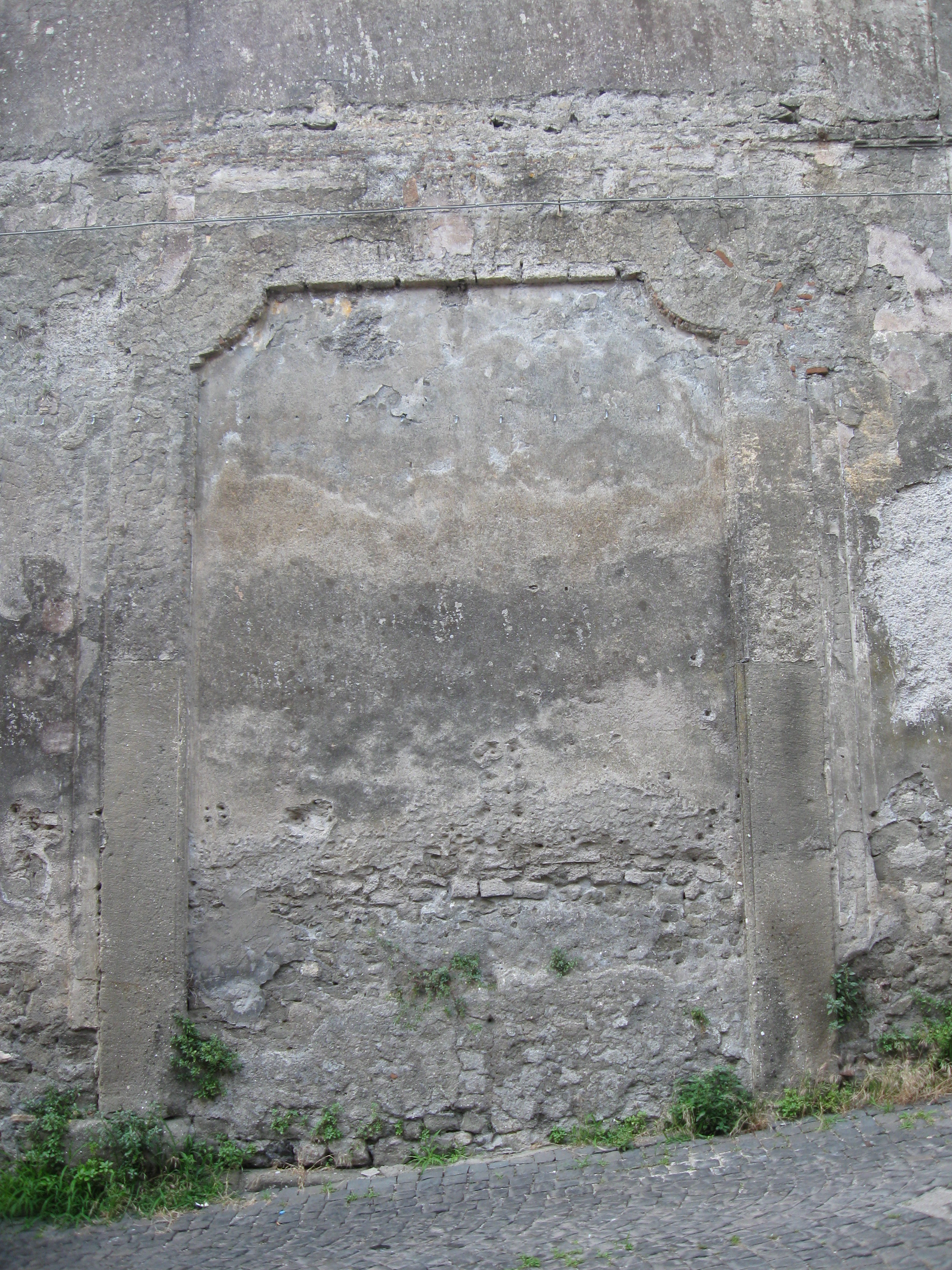
The gatehouse on St. Gaspar del Bufalo Street (June 2009), "blinded" during the 1796-1806 interventions.

The material for the building was easy to obtain: the wood came directly from the Albano woods on the slopes of Lake Albano, the lime from the family estate of Valmontone, and the bricks from Rome, through the Oratorian Fathers of the Chiesa Nuova.

On June 1, 1710, the palace was visited by Pope Clement XI, a friend of Cardinal Benedetto Pamphilj: as the building was completed, it was used as a venue for parties and cultural salons by the literate cardinal.

Cardinal Pamphilj died in Rome on March 22, 1730, leaving the palace to his nephew Camillo Filippo Pamphilj, who in turn died in 1747, leaving all his property to Girolamo Pamphilj, who died in 1760: therefore the palace would fall to his nephew, Cardinal Girolamo Colonna di Sciarra. When the latter also died, in 1763, ownership of the palace passed to Cardinal Marcantonio Colonna and Prince Lorenzo Onofrio II Colonna with his nephews: however, the Genoese prince Andrea Doria Landi, recognized by Pope Clement XIII as the legitimate heir of the Pamphilj (thus began the Doria Landi Pamphili), made claims on the palace. Eventually Prince Doria Landi Pamphilj came to an agreement with the Colonna heirs, leaving to them the ownership of the Albanian palace, which was ultimately sold in 1764 to the Piarist fathers of the Nazarene College in Rome for 7000 pontifical scudi.

=== From the late 18th century to World War II: The Piarists ===
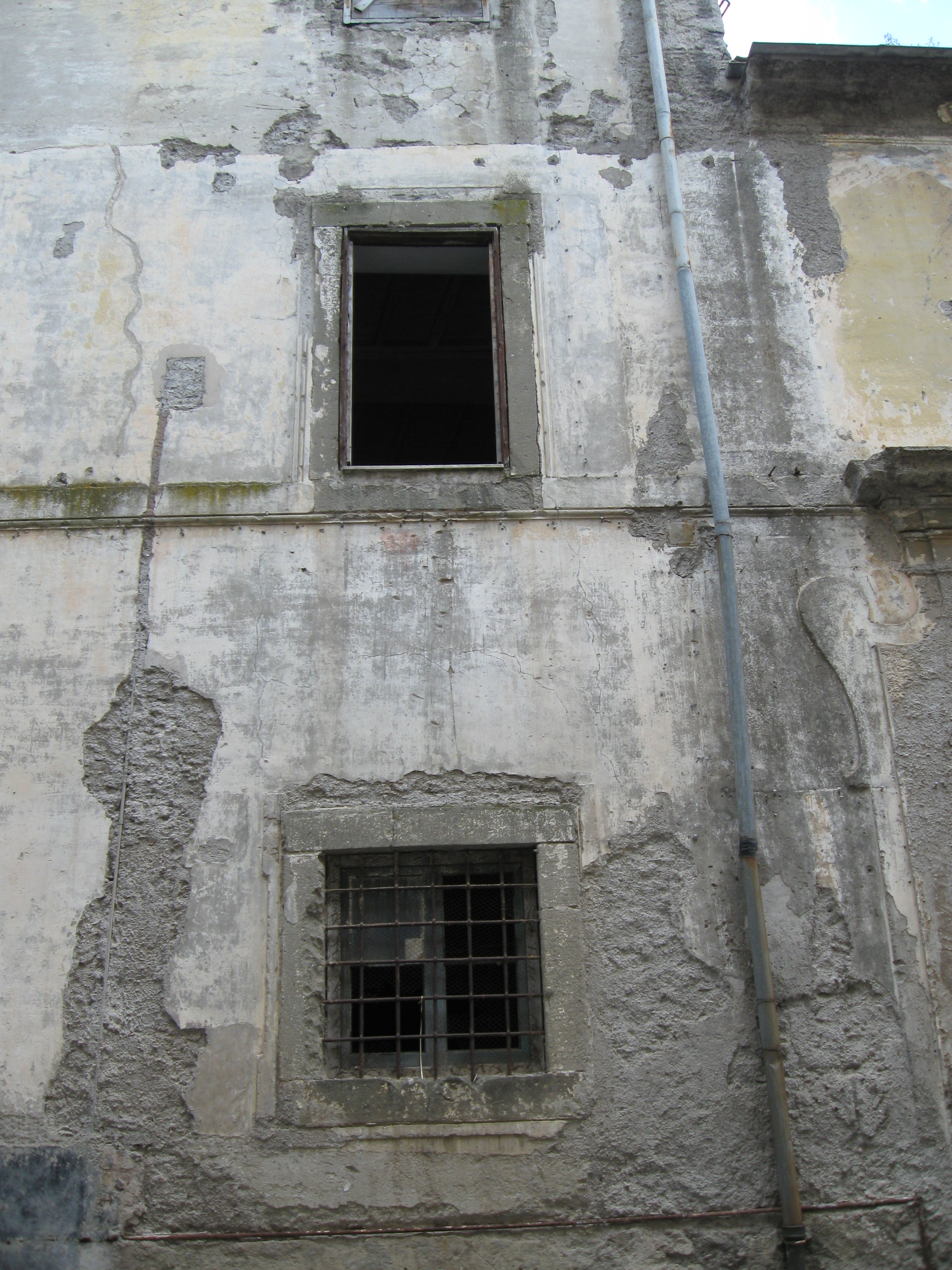
The ground and second floor windows on San Gaspare del Bufalo Street (June 2009).

Since 1758, the students of the Collegio Nazareno, the historic Roman college founded in 1630 and run by the Piarist Fathers, who could not return home during their vacations, stayed at the palace in Albano. The rector of the college, Father Bandini, thought it best to purchase the palace and the adjacent Nuñez casino instead of paying the Colonna family the rent of 200 pontifical scudi. The estimated sum for the purchase amounted to 7,000 scudi (including furnishings), in view of the building's poor condition: payment was made in installments of 1,000 scudi spread over five years during which the Colonna family retained the right of ownership, after an initial down payment of 2,000 scudi.

In 1777 the Piarists called the architect Giuseppe Tarquini to carry out an elevation of the building to obtain more dormitories and toilets, which were otherwise insufficient for the needs of the pupils: however, in 1781 Tarquini himself in an estimate of the palace valued it at 12,000 scudi (including the furniture), even though the masonry and foundations turned out to be very thin.

The solutions proposed by Tarquini in solving the disturbing thinness of the masonry (about 60 centimeters by more than 16 meters high) were excellent and valid for the next three hundred years.

New changes were made between 1796 and 1806 by architect Girolamo Masi, with the construction of new toilets in the palace courtyard, the closing of the gateway on Via San Gaspare del Bufalo, and the rebuilding of the dilapidated attics.

After the proclamation of the Roman Republic (1798-1799) in Rome on February 15, 1798, Albano constituted itself a "sister republic" on February 18, establishing a municipal republican government. However, the Albano population was not slow to rebel against the new regime, and on February 25 they took part in the revolt against the French that broke out in Trastevere: however, the French army commanded by Joachim Murat did not delay in suppressing all reactionary turmoil by occupying and sacking Albano on February 29, 1798. In the French sacking, Pamphilj Palace, occupied by the soldiers, was also damaged, so in 1799 the Piarists had to make the necessary repairs.

Between January 1814 and December 1815 Giuseppe Valadier worked on the palace, restoring the frames of several blind windows: his interventions to the structure can be seen up to 1830. New minor maintenance was carried out in 1879 by architect Palmucci.

The rector of the Nazarene College Father Cianfroca in September 1900 had an inventory made of the objects kept in the palace, followed by a photographic reconnaissance in 1932, nowadays very useful study materials to reconstruct the past grandeur of the palace. During World War I it was granted for use by the Italian army.

=== From World War II to the present: decadence ===
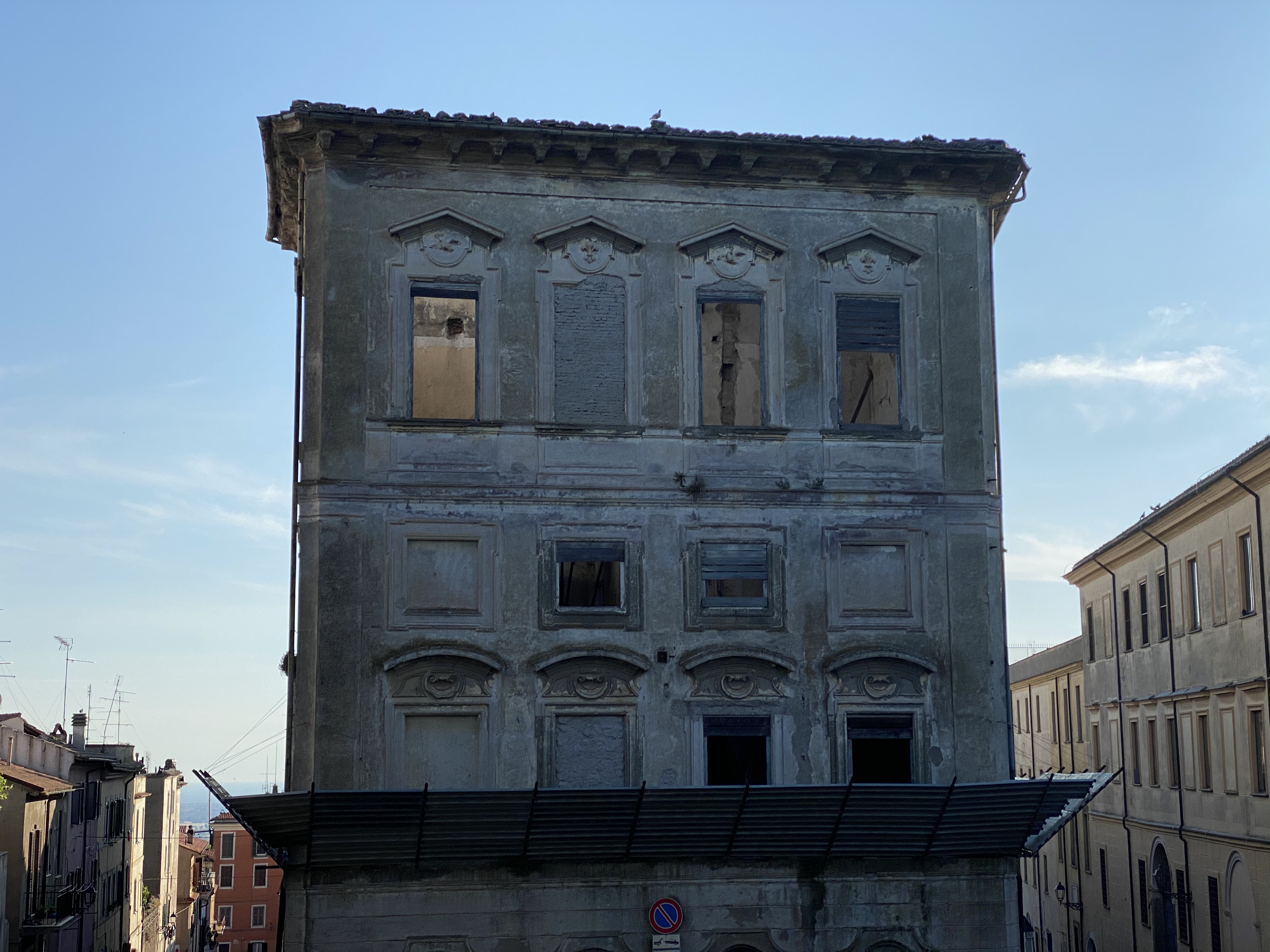
The facade of the building on St. Paul's Square, free of some scaffolding (June 2020).

During World War II Albano Laziale was hit by Anglo-American aerial bombardments for the first time on February 1, 1944, along with Ariccia: a new, dramatic bombardment hit many Albanese war evacuees at Castel Gandolfo, inside the Villa Pontificia in the extra-territorial zone, on February 10.

After the breakthrough of the Hitler Line, the extreme defensive bulwark created by the Germans between Lanuvio, Velletri and Valmontone, on Mount Artemisio on the night of June 3-4, 1944, all the Roman Castles were quickly occupied by the Anglo-Americans. The municipal administration "pro tempore" of Albano believed it appropriate to requisition the palace to house 52 homeless displaced families, for a temporary period of five months: a civil engineer consequently carried out "major adjustment works," disrupting the layout of the palace to obtain apartments and services in the 18th-century premises. At the end of the five-month period, in the absence of other solutions, the Piarists granted permission to the evacuees to stay in the palace upon payment of a rent: the structure underwent numerous tampering, so much so that it was spoken of real "violence" suffered by the building.

In its current state, the building looks like a "ruin of itself," especially after the abandonment by the families of the displaced people that consigned the building to total neglect. Following the adoption of several union ordinances to ensure the safety of the building by private property, for several years the facade of the building toward St. Paul's Square was "wrapped" with scaffolding to prevent the building from collapsing, and scaffolding is still in place today (2020) to prevent the fall of rubble on passersby.

On May 23, 2014, the condition of the building was the subject of a live broadcast of TG3 Regione's "Buongiorno Regione" column. In October 2015, the mayor of Albano, Nicola Marini, issued a new union ordinance, intimating "to have the appropriate and necessary provisional works carried out immediately and in any case within ten days from the date of notification of this ordinance (closing of the entrances to the building with a suitable masonry barrier) as well as all the insurance, consolidation and restoration works strictly necessary to eliminate the danger to public and private safety."

On March 10, 2017, the fate of the building was the subject of a conference organized by the Albano Centro Neighborhood Committee at the Saletta Vespignani adjacent to the Civic Museum, with the intervention of various political and cultural figures.

Since 2016, the palace has been included among the properties to be saved reported to the Fondo Ambiente Italiano as "Places of the Heart."

== Description ==
The palace gradually developed by expansions, starting from the "head" on St. Paul's Square (Filippo Leti, 1708-1711) to the stallions on the courtyard "of the cavallerizza" (Carlo Stefano Fontana, 1717), via the spiral staircase (Simone Costanzi 1708-1709, Filippo Leti 1709-1711) and the wings "toward the sea" (Carlo Stefano Fontana, 1717), looming over Via San Gaspare del Bufalo and Via Leonardo Murialdo, respectively.

The layout given to the building by the interventions commissioned by Cardinal Benedetto Pamphilj and his heirs until 1764 is that of a princely holiday palace, characteristic of 18th-century Rome. The arrangement of the rooms and furniture according to this use is testified by the inventories of 1708 (prior to the extension works, thus referring to the Maculani and Bottini casini), 1725, 1747 and 1761. With the purchase by the Piarist Fathers of the Nazarene College in 1764, the purpose of the palace changed, converted to educational use, and the layout of the rooms also changed, although their furnishings remained largely the 18th-century ones belonging to Cardinal Pamphilj: dormitories for pupils and rooms for the religious were made, as the inventories of 1779 and the last inventory, of 1900, testify.

== The construction ==
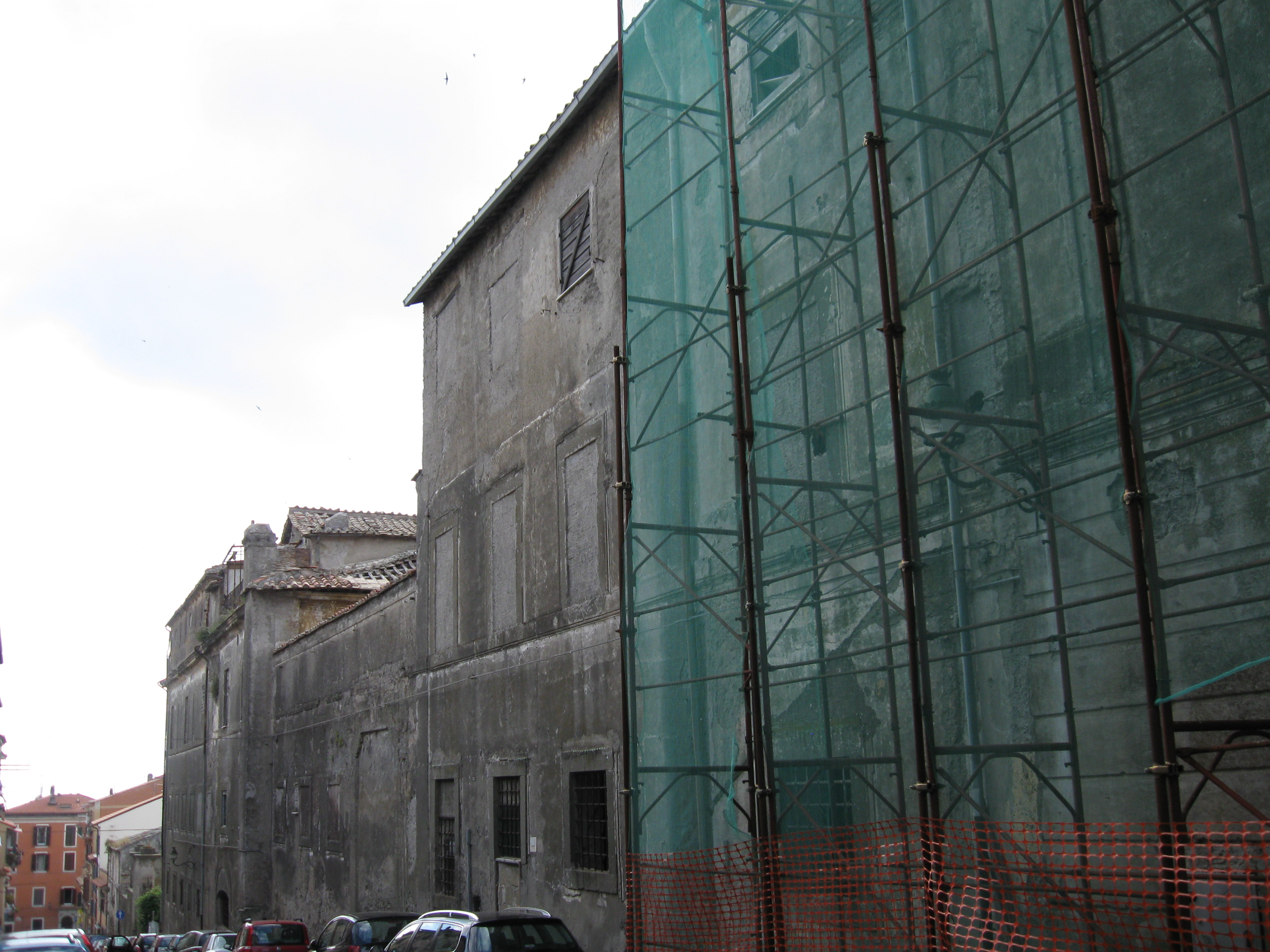
The front of the building on San Gaspare del Bufalo Street (June 2009).

In the ponderous study by Marco Silvestri and Enzo D'Ambrosio ("Palazzo Pamphilj in Albano Laziale," Rome 1988), the building site for the reconstruction and augmentation of the palace is cited as a significant example of a way of building that no longer exists today. The two scholars, reading the very detailed "construction diaries" from 1777 to 1900 preserved in the archives of the Nazarene College in Rome, brought to light the whole "noisy panorama of men intent on working artfully, according to ancient techniques," where "there hovered a deep sense of humanity now unusual to us."

At the head of the building site was the architect, who could serve for a regular salary or, as in the case of the architect Tarquini who directed the 1777 work, be paid regularly by the client for other functions (Tarquini was a teacher at the Nazarene College). He was responsible for taking care of the supply of materials for the construction and occasionally supervising the work: the one who was always present on the site was the foreman, who chose the masons and artisans to be employed in the work, destined for the most disparate roles: from being sent "with a donkey to Palestrina to look for lime" to "[carting] water to dampen the lime" to "[transporting] to Rome three jars of paint, boiled oil, plaster, wine for the Fr. Rector."

=== The redoing of roofs and attics ===
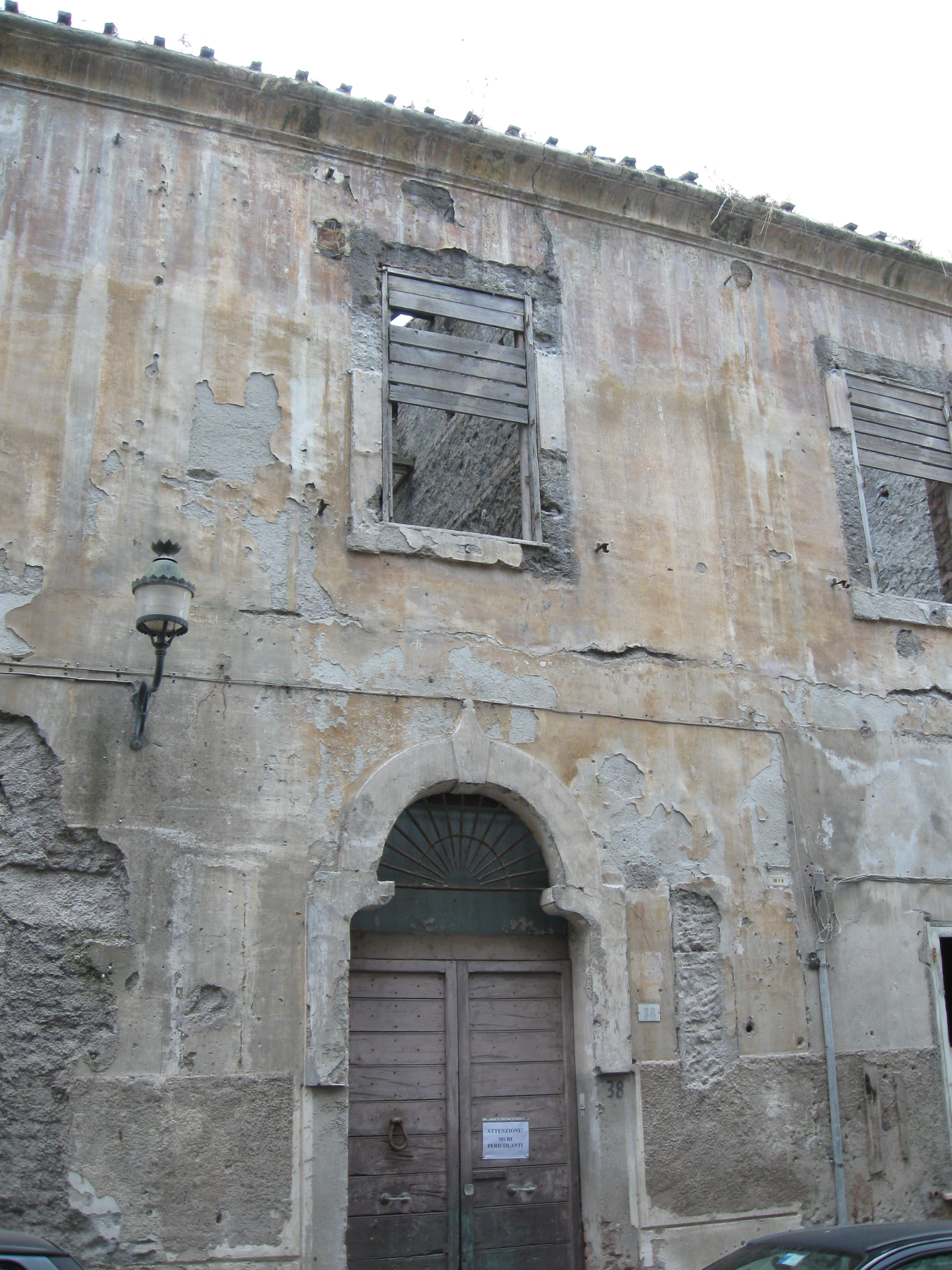
The "stallion" on Leonardo Murialdo Street (June 2009).

One of the most delicate and longest-lasting operations carried out on the site was the re-roofing and re-ceiling after the building was raised in 1777. The lumber from the demolished roofs was re-plastered and used as "chord" (horizontal beam) in the new roofs: the "paradoxes" (oblique beams that weighed on the chords) were instead specially made. The supply of lumber, provided from time to time as it was needed to prevent fires at the building, was provided in the woods of the Alban Hills, where there was an abundance of chestnut, poplar, and elm: large-cut lumber came from Fajola, between Genzano di Roma, Velletri, and Nemi, while small-cut lumber came from Molara, at the foot of the Tuscolo.

The palace roofs, both in the new and old parts, were checked every fifteen to twenty years by technicians until the 1940s, which ensured their functionality and stability. The transport of lumber to the top (the maximum height of the palace walls is 16 meters) was ensured by means of "falcons," a kind of winch, the ancestor of modern cranes: other "devices" such as "scales" (suspended scaffolding) and "candles" (timbers placed vertically around which a scaffold was built) were also used.

=== The plasters ===
The appearance given to the palace by its builders was intended to be noble by using "poor" materials such as peperino and plaster instead of marble and travertine. Consequently, the color of the palace's facades decided upon in the 18th century was the ivory color, ("one coat of white and two of ivory," state the accounts of the painter Giuseppe Muzzi in 1796-1806), alternating with the "color of air," sky-blue, thus forming a "graceful bichromy." Far from modern coloring, tending through wear and tear to gray or moss green. The interiors, on the other hand, were painted in a kind of red tending to pink, refreshed in 1814 during works conducted by Giuseppe Valadier: the blind windows in those same works were painted simulating a "stuccoed glass."

=== Stone materials ===
The main stone material used in the palace is peperino, a local volcanic stone extracted mainly in the quarries of Marino. The lower part of the palace and the corners, like the parts most exposed to wear and tear, were made of peperino plastered with ivory. The cornices of the oval eyelets on the ground floor and of the windows on the first and second floors are also made of the same stone, while the ornamentation is obtained with bricks covered with stucco.

The floor of the covered loggia closed in 1777 was paved with peperino blocks: when the flooring was dismantled, the peperino slabs were reused as thresholds for the doors and windows of the dormitories and rooms. The mezzanine stairs are also made of the same stone.

== Image gallery ==
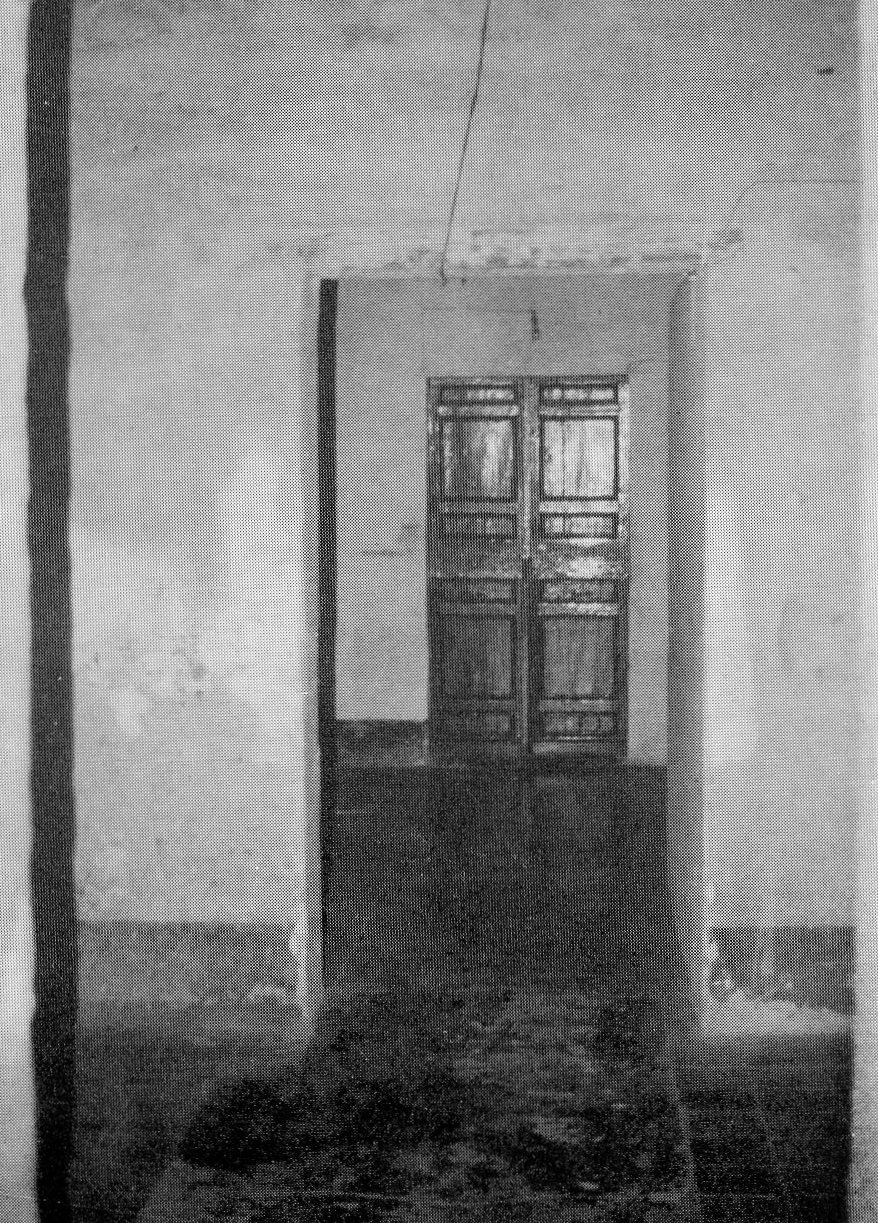
The same interiors on the main floor of the palace in 1988.

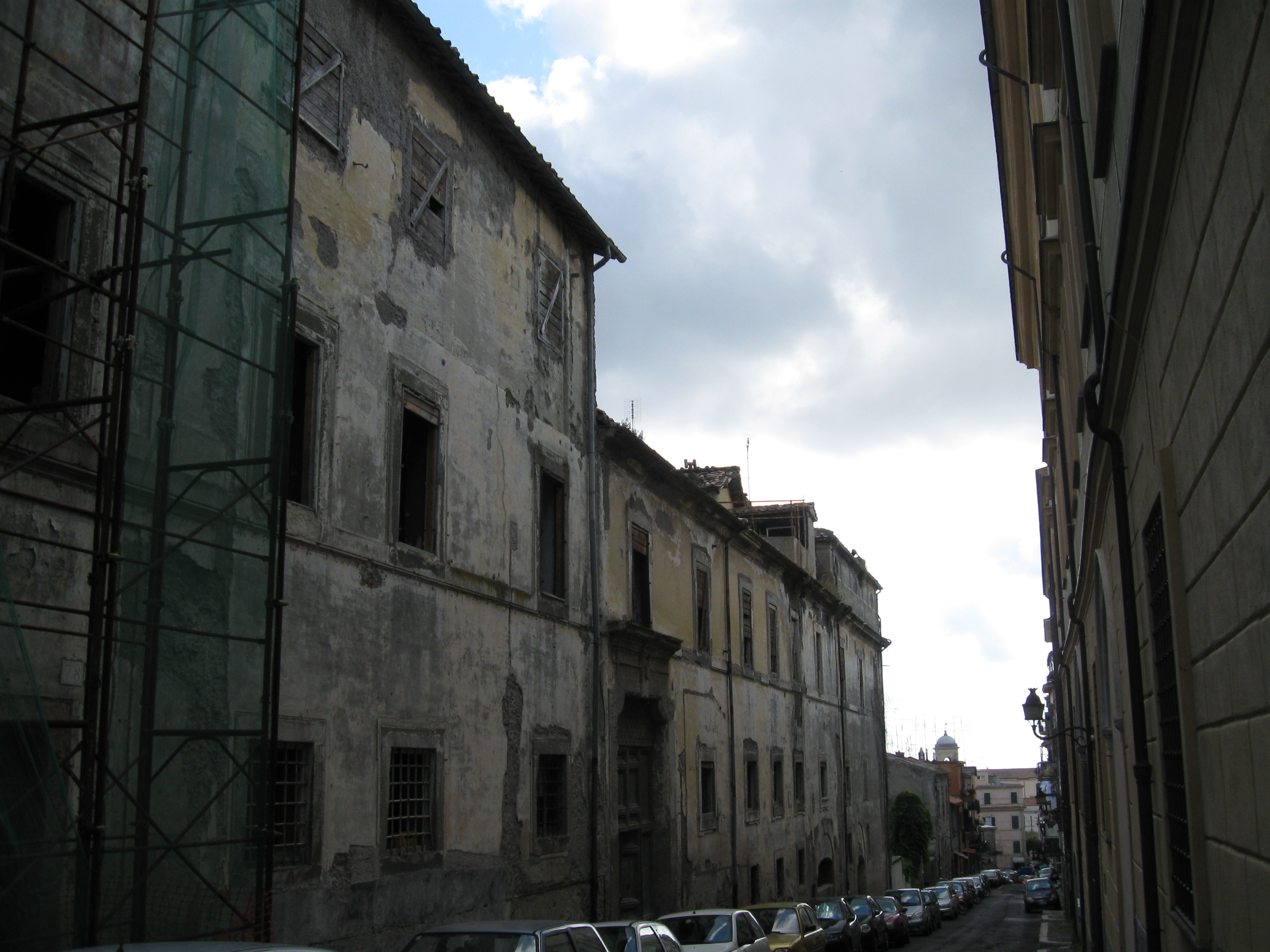
The front of the building on Leonardo Murialdo Street (June 2009).

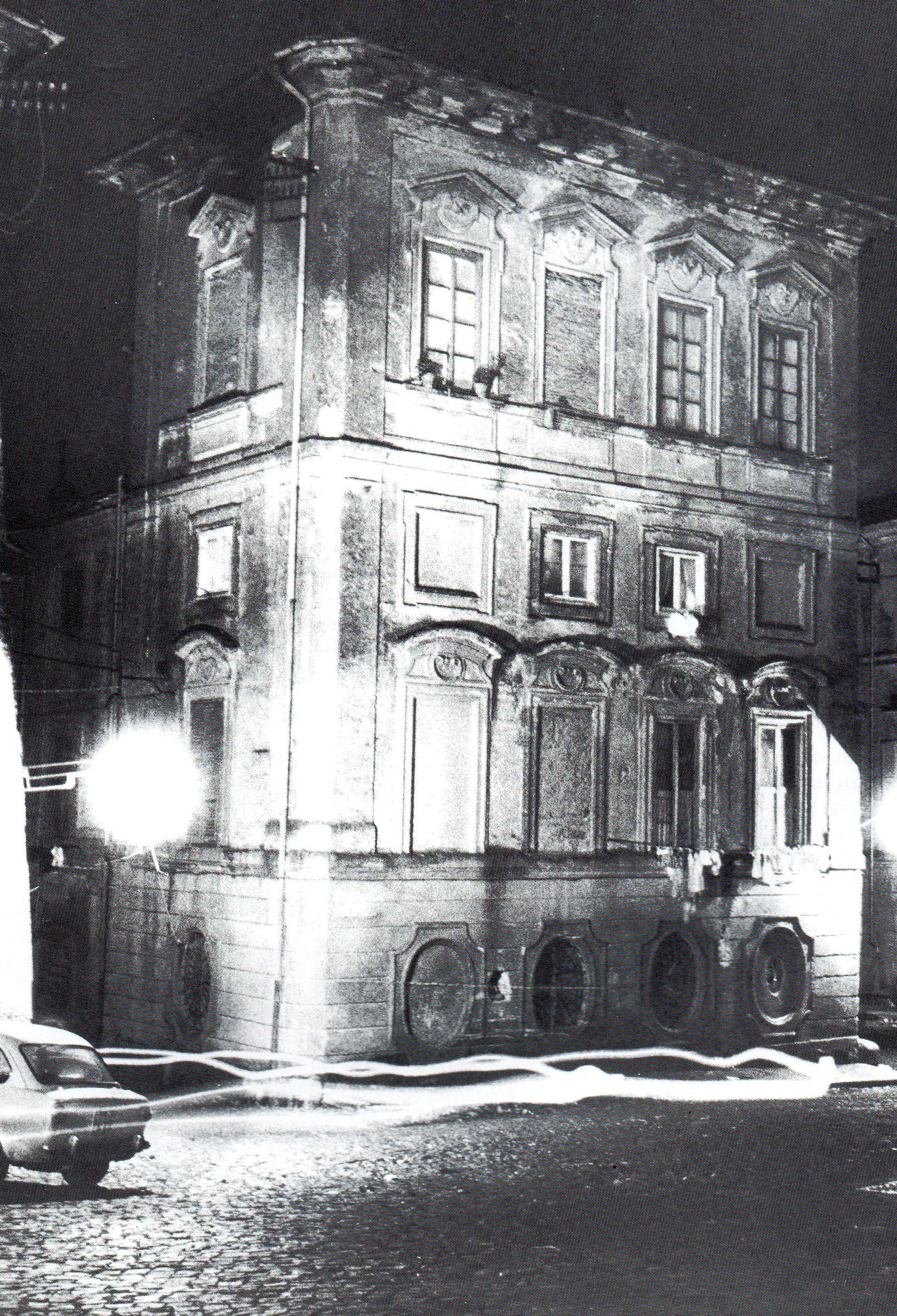
The facade of the building on St. Paul's Square in 1982.

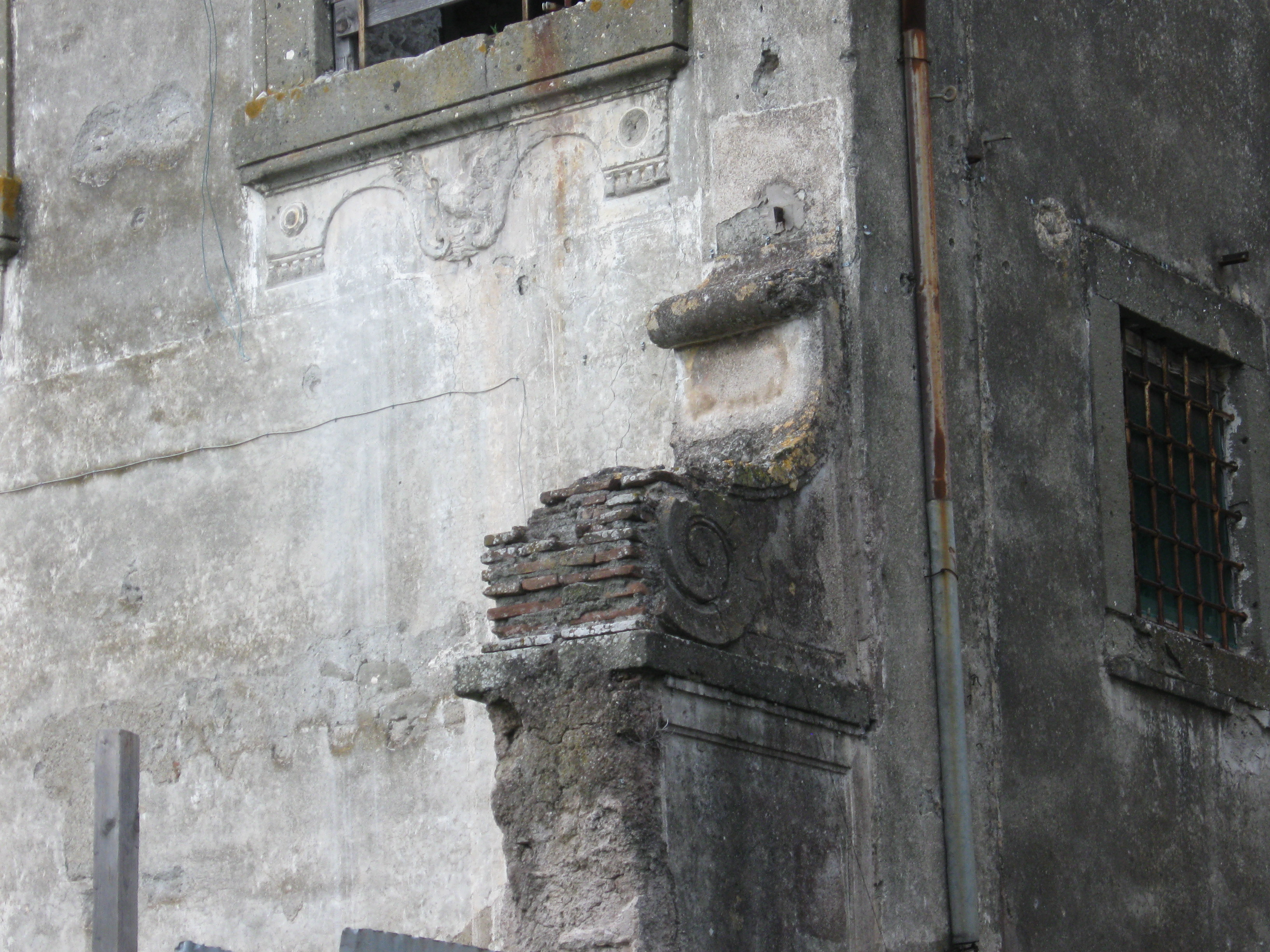
Bricks in evidence on a volute of the boundary wall on St. Gaspare del Bufalo Street (June 2009).

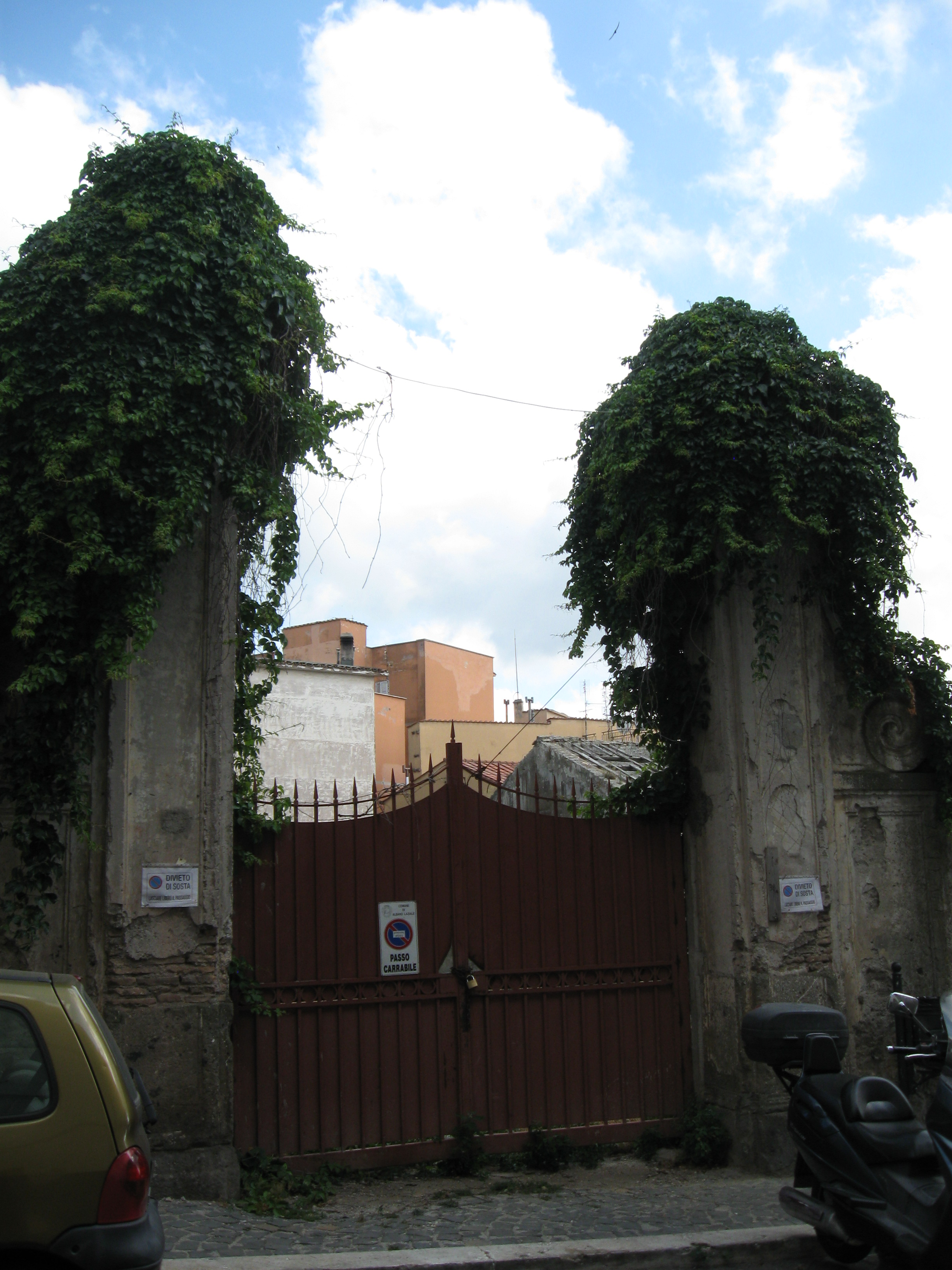
The gate of the courtyard "of the cavallerizza" on Leonardo Murialdo Street (June 2009).

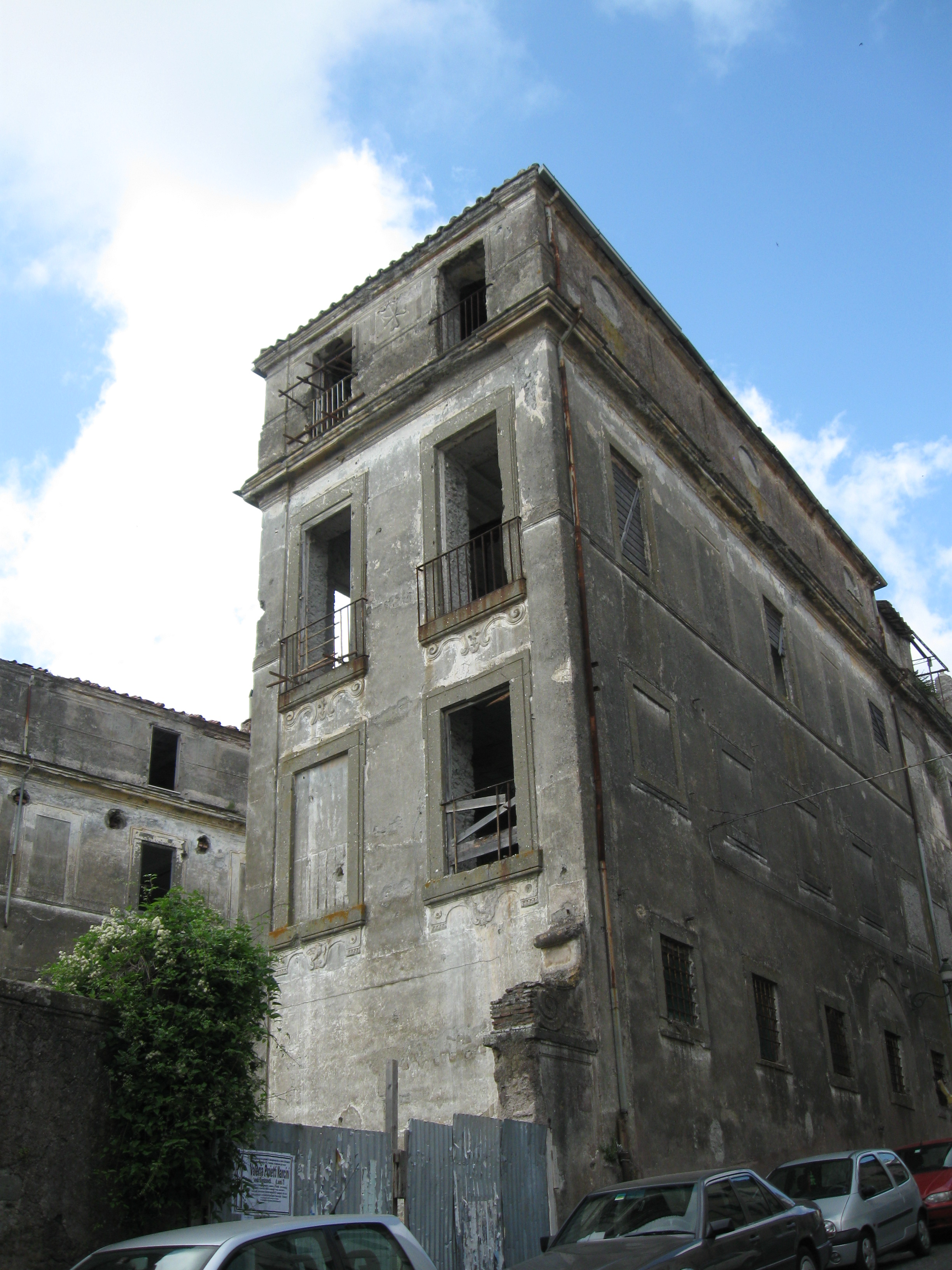
The side of the building looming over San Gaspare del Bufalo Street (June 2009).

== See also ==
- Lake Albano
- Roman Castles
- Albano Cathedral

== Bibliography ==
- Crielesi, Alberto (2015). Le dimore storiche di Albano: la città dimenticata. Albano Laziale: ITL.
- Maria Rybko, Anna (1990). "Un mecenate del Settecento ad Albano". AA.VV., L'arte per i papi e per i principi nella campagna romana. Vol. II. Rome: Quasar. pp. 261–298.
- Silvestri, Marco; D'Ambrosio, Enzo (1988). Palazzo Pamphilj in Albano Laziale (I ed.). Rome: Accademia degli Incolti.
- Del Pinto, Giuseppe (1918). Albano nel 1798 (I ed.). Rome: Tipografia della Camera dei Deputati.
- Chiarucci, Pino (1988). Albano Laziale (II ed.). Albano Laziale: Museo civico di Albano Laziale.
- Ricci, Giovanni Antonio (1787). Memorie storiche dell'antichissima città di Alba Longa e dell'Albano moderno (I ed.). Rome: Stamperia Giovanni Zempel.
- Moroni, Gaetano (1840). Dizionario di erudizione storico-ecclesiastica (I ed.). Venice: Tipografia Emiliana.
