= Melchior Inchofer =

Austrian-Hungarian Jesuit

- Inchofer Menyhért
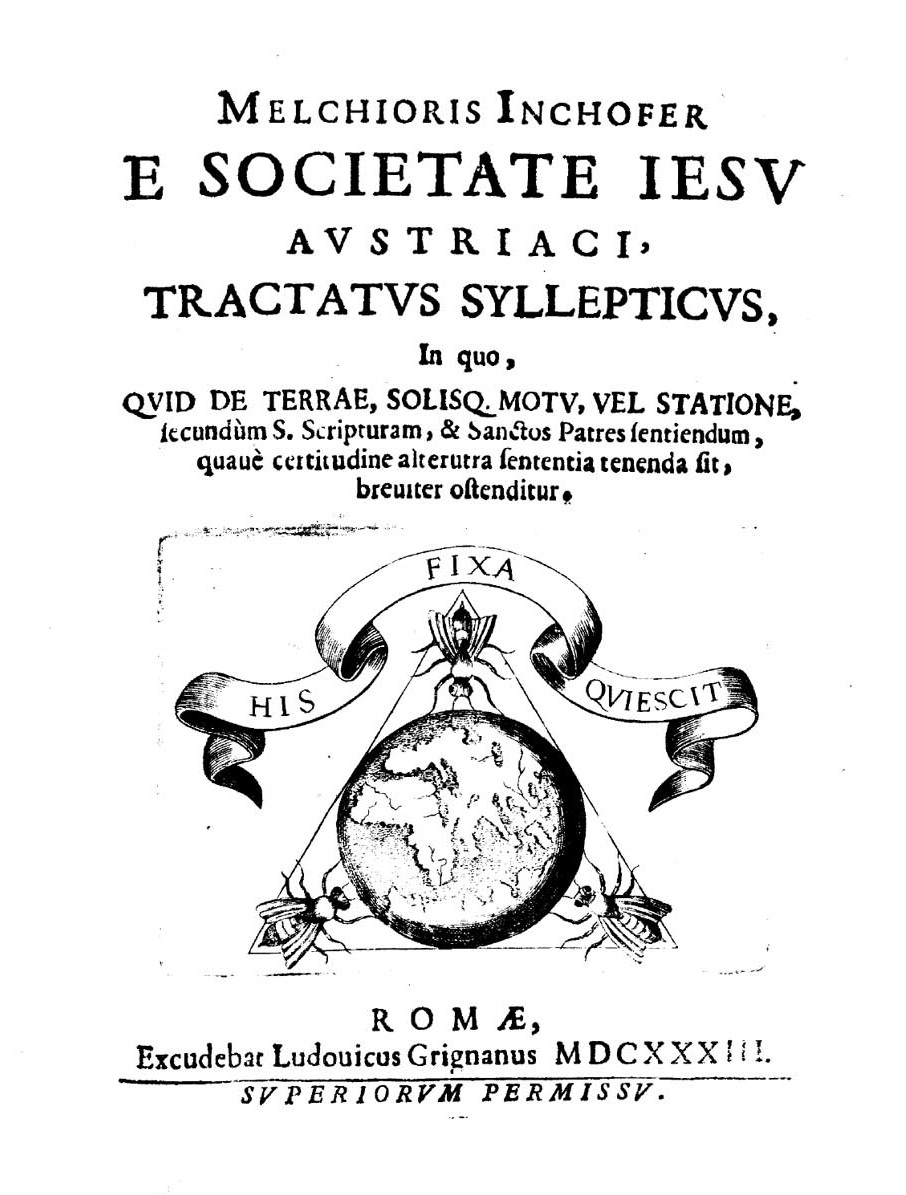
- Tractatus syllepticus, 1633
- Born: c. 1584; Kőszeg
- Died: 28 September 1648; Milan
- Other names: Imhofer

Academic work
- Discipline: theology
- Notable works: Tractatus Syllepticus

Melchior Inchofer or Imhofer, in Hungarian: Inchofer Menyhért (c. 1584 – 28 September 1648) was an Austrian-Hungarian Jesuit. He played an important part in the trial of Galileo, by his arguments, later published in his Tractatus Syllepticus, that Galileo was an advocate of the Copernican system. His role in the Galileo affair is being reassessed in the light of fresh documentary evidence.

== Life ==
He was born at Kőszeg in 1584 and died at Milan on 28 September 1648. He was born to Lutheran parents but was converted to Catholicism by Jesuit missionaries. In 1607 he entered the Society of Jesus in Rome, and after the completion of his novitiate went to Messina, where he taught philosophy, mathematics, and theology.

In december 1632 the Holy Office examined Galileo's Dialogue of the Two World Systems, and through his link with Niccolò Riccardi, Inchofer was chosen as one of a panel of three theologians appointed to assess the work, the others being Agostino Oreggi and Zaccaria Pasqualigo. Inchofer's lengthy report concluded that the Dialogue taught Copernicanism, that Galileo was a Copernican, and that the book was designed as an attack on Christoph Scheiner. There exists in the papers of the Congregation of the Index an unsigned statement, in Inchofer's hand, reviewing the anonymous denunciation of Galileo following the publication of The Assayer, which was undertaken by the panel in 1633. All three theologians agreed that in publishing the Dialogue, Galileo had both taught and defended Copernican beliefs, as he had committed himself not to do in 1616. On the question of whether Galileo actually held these proscribed views himself, neither Oreggi nor Pasqualigo could be sure; only Inchofer asserted unequivocally that he did. Citing twenty-seven passages to support his judgment, he asked: 'What Catholic ever conducted such a bitter dispute against heretics... as Galileo does against those who maintain the earth's immobility?'

In 1634 he resumed his professorship in Sicily, where he remained until 1636, when his order called him to Rome that he might devote himself entirely to writing. Here he became a friend of Nicholas Riccardi and a political adviser to Francesco Barberini from 1637 to 1647. He endorsed strongly the work of Athanasius Kircher on the Coptic language. His dispute with Joachim Pasqualigo on the immorality of making castrati, and his appointment as member of the Congregation of the Index and of the Holy Office dissatisfied him with Rome, and at his own request he was transferred in 1645 to the college at Macerata where he intended to devote his leisure hours to the compilation of a history of martyrs. The last few years of his life were troubled, and he was brought to trial by his order in 1648 for contributing to an anti-Jesuit tract. He confessed, received a salutary penance, and was sentenced, as Galileo had been, to indefinite detention. With the situation unresolved he undertook a journey to the Ambrosian library at Milan, but died there.

== Works ==
In his Epistolae Beatae Mariae Virginis ad Messanenses veritatis vindicata (Messina, 1629) he endeavored to prove the genuineness of the epistle and the apostolic activity of Saint Paul at Messina, but the Congregation of the Index summoned him to Rome and suppressed the first edition, although he was permitted to remove all objectionable features from his work and republish it. Following Galileo's trial, Inchofer published Tractus Syllepticus (Rome, 1633), which argues that belief in an immobile earth and a moving sun were matters of faith for Catholics.

Melchior Inchofer also wrote Annales ecclesiastici regni Hungariae (Rome, I. 1644), the history of the Hungarian Christian Church; in which he pioneered the science of sources. Working in the Vatican Archives he collected and systematically analyzed a huge amount of written sources for his work, including many which have since been lost when Napoleon dispersed the archive’s collections among libraries in France. Only the first volume of Inchofer’s work was published. The second volume exists only as a manuscript, held today in the National Széchényi Library in Budapest. He was so exhaustive in his work that the first volume only goes up to the year 1059, and the second volume up to 1159. Besides ecclesiastical history, Inchofer also included some interesting natural phenomena observed in Hungary (earthquakes, meteors, comets, lunar eclipses, and meteorological phenomena).

In Historia sacrae Latinitatis (Messina, 1635), Inchofer elevated Latin to the rank of a heavenly court language and regarded it as the speech of the blessed. He also described the history of teaching Latin, drawing heavily on the pioneering work in the history of education, Jakob Middendorp's Academiae orbis Christiani, first published in 1567. He was also the author of astronomical works, and in three polemical treatises (1638–1641) he defended the order of the Jesuits and its mode of education, which had been attacked by Caspar Scioppius. He attained his main contemporary fame, however, by the anonymous Lucii Cornelii Europaei monarchia Solipsorum, ad virum clarissimum Leonum Allatium (Venice, 1645); the long-accepted view is that of François Oudin writing in 1736 for the Mémoires of Jean-Pierre Nicéron, namely that it was incorrectly attributed to him and was really by Giulio Clemente Scotti, but recently scholars have re-opened the question.
