= Benedetto Pamphili =

Italian cardinal and librettist (1653–1730)

His Eminence Benedetto Pamphili
- Cardinal-Deacon of Santa Maria in Via Lata
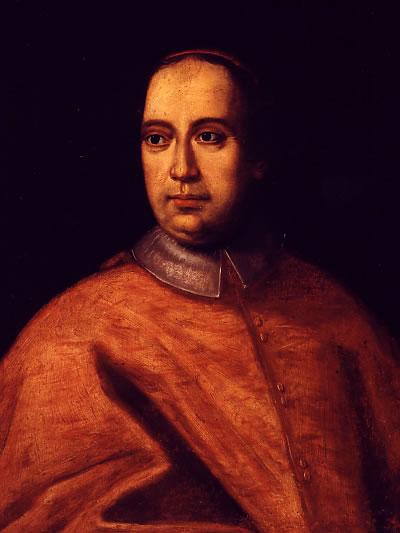
- Church: Catholic Church
- Appointed: 22 December 1693
- Term ended: 22 March 1730
- Predecessor: Urbano Sacchetti
- Successor: Lorenzo Altieri

Orders
- Created cardinal: 1 September 1681 by Pope Innocent XI
- Rank: Cardinal-Deacon

Personal details
- Born: 25 April 1653 Rome, Papal States
- Died: 22 March 1730 (aged 76) Fano, Italy
- Buried: Sant'Agnese in Agone
- Coat of arms: Benedetto Pamphili's coat of arms

Benedetto Pamphili (often with the final long i orthography, Pamphilj) (25 April 1653 – 22 March 1730) was an Italian cardinal, patron of the arts and librettist for many composers.

== Life ==
Pamphili was born in Rome on 25 April 1653 into the powerful Pamphili family. His father was Camillo Pamphili who had also been a cardinal but renounced his post to marry Olimpia Aldobrandini.

Pamphili was Grand Prior of the Order of St John of Jerusalem in Rome from 1678 until Pope Innocent XI made him cardinal-deacon of Santa Maria in Portico in the consistory of 1 September 1681.

He later opted for the tituli of Sant'Agata in Suburra, San Cesareo in Palatio, Santa Maria in Cosmedin and Santa Maria in Via Lata.

Innocent XI made him Prefect of the Apostolic Signatura on 23 March 1685. He became Cardinal Legate of Bologna in 1690, cardinal protodeacon in 1693, as well as archpriest of the basilica of Santa Maria Maggiore and of San Giovanni in Laterano.

In 1704 he was made librarian of the Biblioteca Apostolica Vaticana and archivist of the Archivio Segreto Vaticano. He died in 1730 and is buried at Sant'Agnese in Agone.

== Patronage ==
He was in the first rank of Rome's cultural and artistic life in the 17th and 18th centuries, as demonstrated by his belonging to the prestigious accademia dell'Arcadia, under the pseudonym Fenicio Larisseo. He formed the major collection of Flemish paintings in the Galleria Doria Pamphilj, whose interior (by Carlo Fontana) and chapel he had built.

He was particularly interested and skilled in music, not only writing several libretti himself for operas with music by (among others) Alessandro Scarlatti, but also gave hospitality and opportunity to several composers (such as Arcangelo Corelli, Giovanni Lorenzo Lulier, Alessandro Melani, Antonio Maria Bononcini and Carlo Francesco Cesarini, who all began their musical careers under his protection), funding publication and performances of their works. His patronage was also expressed during George Frideric Handel's stay in Rome, when he struck up a lasting friendship with the composer and began an interesting correspondence with him. Handel dedicated a series of cantatas to the cardinal, as well as the famous 1707 oratorio Il trionfo del Tempo e del Disinganno, with a libretto by the cardinal.

== Works: libretti and scores ==
- S. Maria Maddalena de' Pazzi. Oratorio da cantarsi nel giorno della sua festa alla presenza dell'eminentiss. sig. card.le de' Medici. Tinassi, Rome, 1687.
- Conversione di S. M. Maddalena. Oratorio a tre voci da cantarsi nella chiesa de' padri della congregazione dell' oratorio di S. Filippo Neri di Firenze, music by Alessandro Scarlatti. Vangelisti, Florence, 1693.
- S. Francesca Romana. Oratorio a cinque voci da cantarsi nella chiesa de' padri della congregazione dell'oratorio di S. Filippo Neri di Firenze, music by Alessandro Melani. Vangelisti, Florence, 1693.
- Il sagrifizio di Abel. Oratorio a quattro voci da cantarsi nella chiesa de' padri della Congregazione dell'Oratorio di S. Filippo Neri di Firenze, music by Alessandro Melani. Vangelisti, Florence, 1693.
- S. Rosa di Viterbo del sacro ordine di S. Francesco. Oratorio a cinque voci da cantarsi nella chiesa de' padri della congregazione dell' oratorio di san Filippo Neri di Firenze, music by Alessandro Melani. Vangelisti, Florence, 1693.
- Il martirio di S. Vittoria. Oratorio a quattro voci da cantarsi nella chiesa de' padri della congregazione dell' oratorio di S. Filippo Neri di Firenze, music by Giovanni del Violone. Vangelisti, Florence, 1693.
- L' Ismaele soccorso dall' angelo. Oratorio a cinque voci da cantarsi nella venerabible compagnia dell' angiolo Raffaello detta la scala, music by Alessandro Scarlatti. Vangelisti, Florence, 1695.
- Il trionfo della grazia o vero La conversione di S.M. Maddalena oratorio a tre voci da cantarsi nel nobil collegio Tolomei di Siena, music by Alessandro Scarlatti. Miccioni, Florence, 1699.
- Santa Maria Maddalena de' Pazzi. Oratorio dedicato da' convittori del collegio Clementino alla madre suor Maria Grazia di S. Clemente carmelitana. Bernabo, Rome, 1705.
- Il trionfo della Vergine assunta in cielo. Oratorio a quattro voci da cantarsi nella venerabil compagnia della Purificazione di Maria Vergine e S. Zanobi detta di S. Marco, music by Alessandro Scarlatti. Vangelisti, Florence, 1706.
- Il trionfo del Tempo e del Disinganno, music by George Frideric Handel, Rome, summer 1707.
- Il trionfo della Grazia. Oratorio, music by Antonio Maria Bononcini. eredi Cosmeroviani, Vienna, 1707.
- Sedecia re di Gerusalemme. Oratorio per musica da cantarsi nelle stanze de' paggi d'onore di sua altezza reale dedicato da' medesimi al serenissimo gran duca. Borghigiani, Florence, 1707.
- Il figliol prodigo. Oratorio, music by Carlo Francesco Cesarini. Bernabo, Rome, 1708.
- Maria Maddalena de' pazzi. Oratorio a quattro voci fatta cantare da monsignor Sebastiano Pompilio Bonaventura vescovo di Montefiascone, e Corneto alla presenza delle reali maestà di Giacomo Terzo re della Gran Bretagna, e Maria Clementina Sobieschi di lui regia consorte, music by Alessandro Scarlatti. Seminario, Montefiascone, 1719.

== See also ==
- Pamphilj Palace (Albano)
