= Ferdinando Cesarini =

Italian poet and physicist

- Born: 1606; Rome, Italy
- Died: 8 March 1646 (aged 41–42); Rome, Italy
- Occupations: poet and physicist

Ferdinando Cesarini (c. 1606–1646) was an Italian poet and physicist

== Life ==
Born in Rome in a noble family. Brother of the better-known Virginio Cesarini (1596–1624) to whom Galileo Galilei (1564–1642) addressed Il Saggiatore [The Assayer] (Rome, 1623) in the form of a letter. Ferdinando Cesarini, as a referendarius utriusque signaturae and patron, corresponded with Benedetto Castelli (1577/8-1643), who described the Galilean thermoscope to him in a letter of September 20, 1638.

Father Castelli also invited him to spread the Discorso sulla calamita [Discourse on the loadstone], also dedicated to Cesarini, within a limited circle of "trust" people. Fundamental was the ascending of Cesarini, who pushed Castelli to turn his thoughts around the most "noble fields of the philosophizing".

Cesarini also had contacts with Giovanni Ciampoli, who presented him in a poem and with whom, in the late nineteenth century, he was counted among the prelates of his era inclined "to promote the progress of science".

As a poet he mostly distinguished himself in the satirical poetry; he was also the author of a Latin oration in memory of St. Aloysius Gonzaga that he declaimed, fifteen, in the presence of several cardinals, and of a Latin poem, recited in Jesuits' Roman College, for the election of the Emperor Ferdinand II.

Cesarini died at age forty-two, leaving as his executor and heir Cardinal Federico Sforza.

== Works ==
- De beato Aloysio Gonzaga oratio Romae habita ab illustriss. Ferdinando Caesarini ducis fratre (1618)
- Gratulatio Ferdinando Cæsari dicta a Ferdinando Cæsarini Ducis fratre in Collegio Romano Soci. Iesu (1619)

== Sources ==
- Leone Allacci (1633). "Ferdinando Cesarini". Leonis Allatii Apes Vrbanae, siue De viris illustribus, qui ab anno 1630. per totum 1632. Romæ adfuerunt, ac typis aliquid euulgarunt. Roma: excudebat Ludouicus Grignanus. p. 92.
