= Carlo Francesco Cesarini =

Italian composer

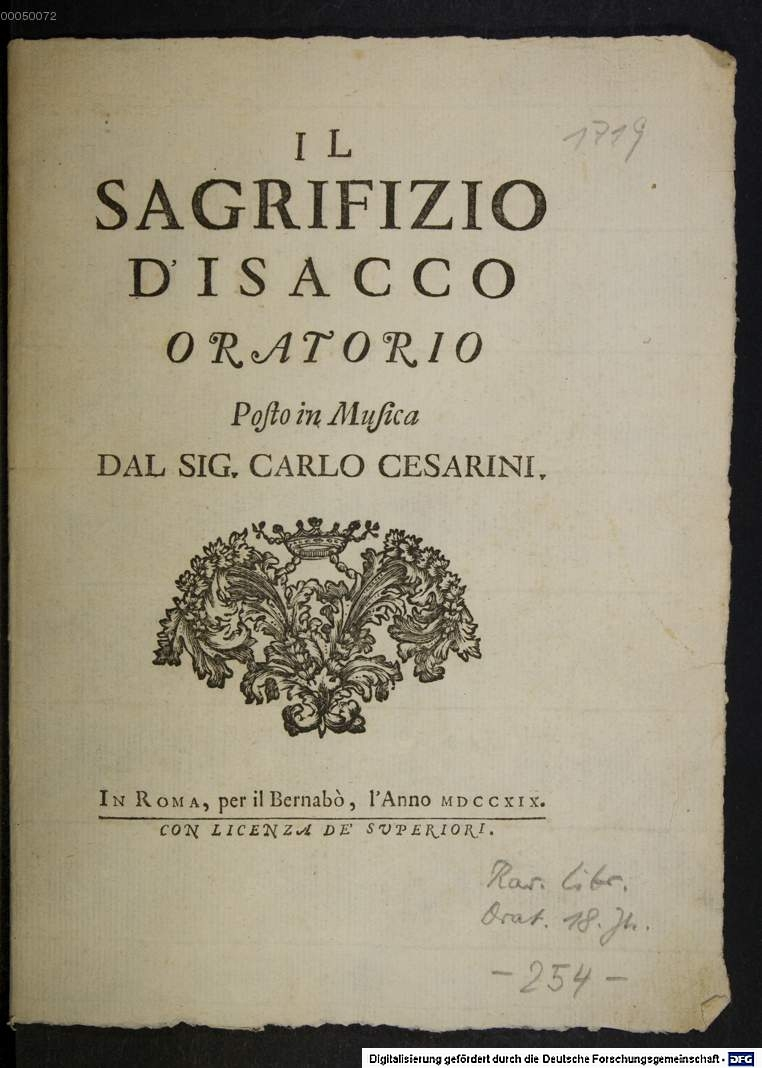
Carlo Francesco Portrait

Carlo Francesco Cesarini, (c.1666 – after 2 September 1741) was an Italian composer born in San Martino al Cimino near Viterbo and active in Rome from 1690.

In 1690, he entered into the service of Cardinal Benedetto Pamphili as the director of his music academy and remained in his service until the cardinal's death in 1730. Cesarini also served as the maestro di cappella in the Chiesa del Gesù from 1704 until 31 August 1741. He composed numerous oratorios and cantatas and was the joint composer of several operas. The opera Clearco in Negroponte which he composed with Giovanni Lorenzo Lulier and Tommaso Bernardo Gaffi inaugurated the public opening of the Teatro Capranica on 18 January 1695.

He also set to music many oratorios on Benedetto Pamphili's texts: San Vincislao (1704), Il figliol prodigo (1707), Oratorio per l'Assunzione della beatissima Vergine (1713), e Il trionfo del Tempo nella Bellezza ravveduta (1725). The last known records of him date from early September 1741 and document his retirement as the maestro di cappella of the Chiesa del Gesù due to ill health.

Some cantatas of him were recently published in modern edition.

== Bibliography ==
- Alexandra Nigito, "Le conversazioni in musica: Carlo Francesco Cesarini, virtuoso di Sua Eccellenza Padrone", in The Pamphilj and the Arts: Patronage and Consumption in Baroque Rome, ed. by Stephanie C. Leone, Boston, 2011, pp. 161–188.
