= Ceserani =

Ceserani is an Italian surname. Notable people with the surname include:

- Lamberto Ceserani (born 1953), Italian former ice dancer.
- Victor Ceserani (1919 – 2017), British cook, teacher and writer

== See also ==
- Cesarini
