= Giovanni Lorenzo Lulier =

Italian composer

Giovanni Lorenzo Lulier, nicknamed Giovannino del Violone (Little John of the Violone) (c. 1662 – 29 March 1700) was a Baroque Italian composer, cellist and trombone player of Spanish descent.

== Life ==
Lulier was born and died in Rome. He was a student of Pietro Simone Agostini, a composer and violin virtuoso in the service of Pietro Ottoboni. From 1676 to 1699, Lulier played regularly in the Roman church of San Luigi dei Francesi; on 13 October 1679, he entered the Congregazione di Santa Cecilia. From 1681, he was active in the service of Benedetto Pamphili and from 1688, he played the trombone in the Musici del Campidoglio.

When Pamphili left Rome in 1690, Lulier again became the protégé of cardinal Ottoboni and remained so for the rest of his life. In the 1690s, he also worked for the Borghese family, and probably played the cello in the orchestra in which another Pamphili protégé, Arcangelo Corelli, was principal violinist. Some works for cello by Lulier have survived, and also a number of vocal works with concertate cello parts. His compositions include cantatas and a number of oratorios.
