= Virginio Cesarini =

Italian poet and intellectual

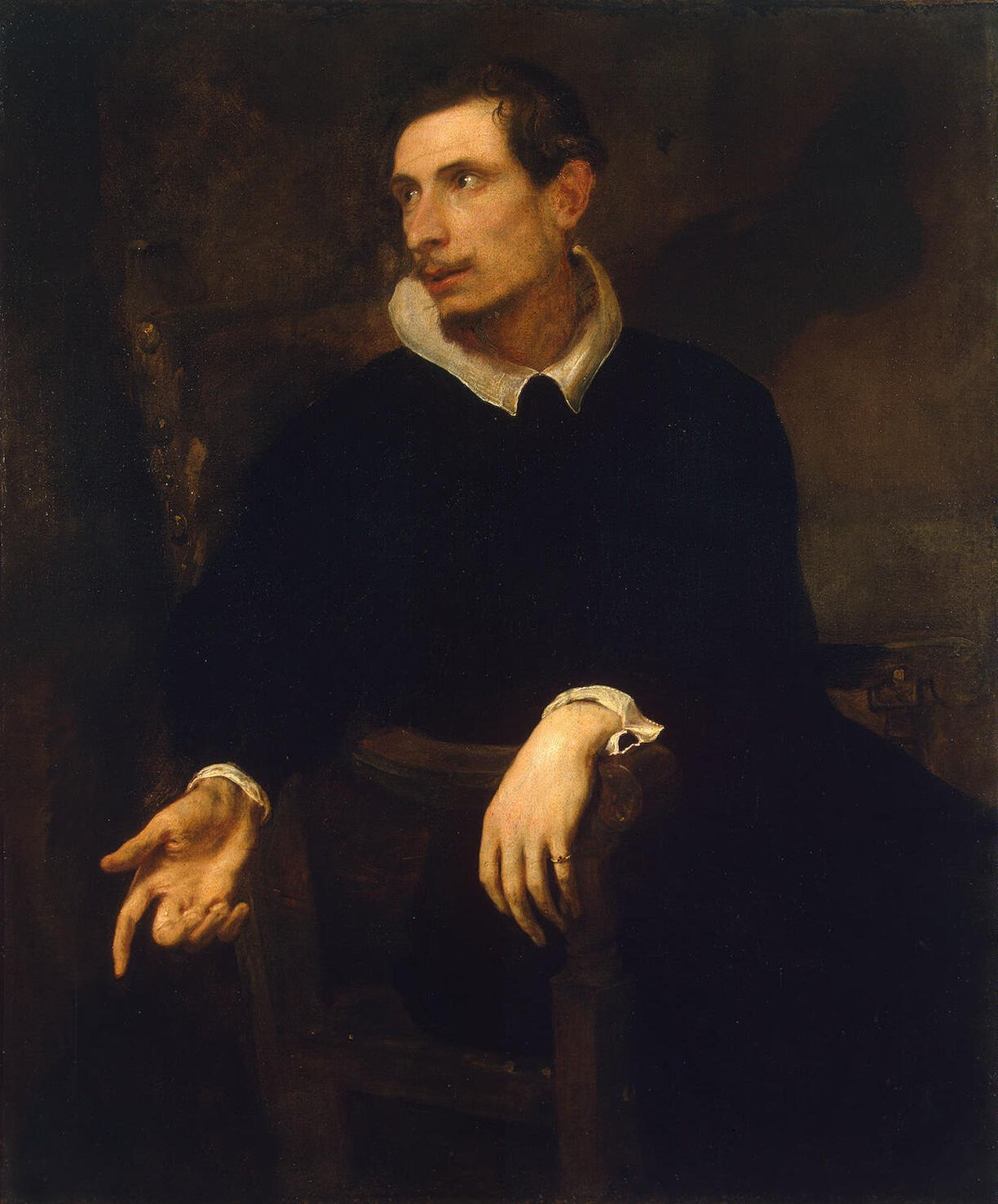
- Virginio Cesarini, by Van Dyck
- Born: 20 October 1595; Rome, Papal States
- Died: 1 April 1624 (aged 28); Rome, Papal States
- Education: University of Parma
- Occupations: Poet; Intellectual
- Writing career
- Parent(s): Giuliano Cesarini and Livia Cesarini (née Orsini)
- Language: Latin; Italian
- Period: 17th century; Baroque literature
- Genres: Poetry
- Literary movement: Baroque; Classicism

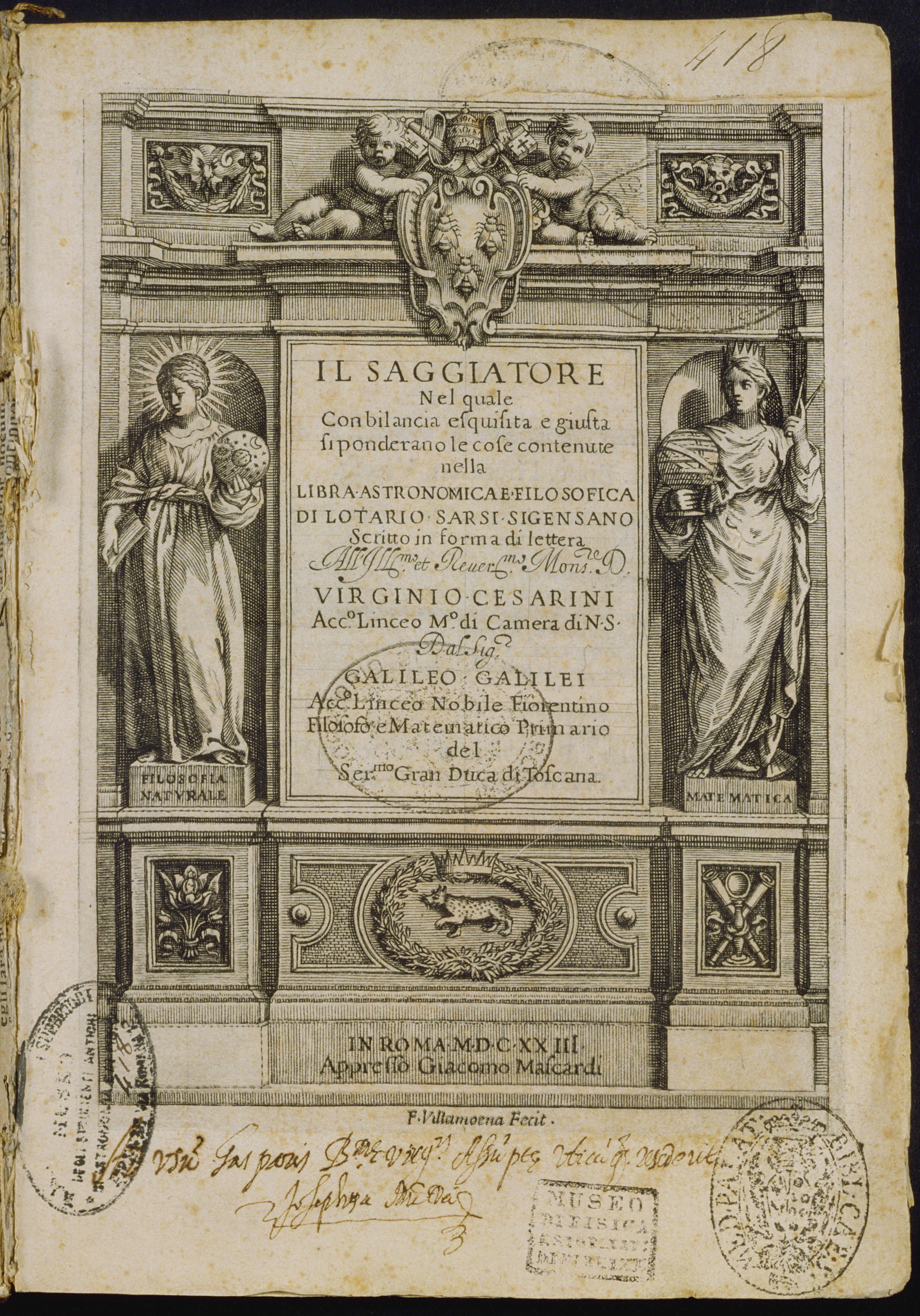
Dedication to Cesarini on the frontispiece of Galileo's 'Il Saggiatore'

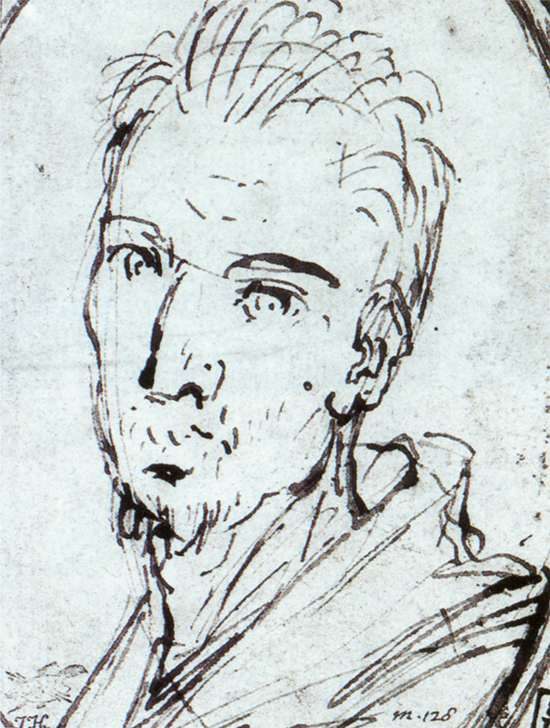
Virginio Cesarini, sketch by Domenichino

Virginio Cesarini (20 October 1595, in Rome – 1 April 1624, in Rome) was an Italian poet and intellectual. A member of the Lyncean Academy, he was a close friend of Galileo.

== Youth and Education ==
The son of Giuliano Cesarini, duke of Civitanova, and his wife Livia Orsini, he was sent together with his brother Alessandro to study at Parma, where he was hosted by duke Ranuccio I Farnese. During this period, as a result of a fall from a horse and an inept operation, his health, already delicate, became even more fragile. He returned to Rome in 1610, and pursued a range of interests including theology, jurisprudence, mathematics and astronomy, as was consistent with prevailing ideas about a cultural education, founded on Aristotelian philosophy.

== Career in Rome ==
He was on friendly terms with Cardinal Robert Bellarmine and Maffeo Barberini (later Pope Urban VIII) as well as with Prince Federico Cesi, patron of the Accademia dei Lincei. In 1618, Cesarini became a member of the Accademia. It was here that he encountered both Galileo and Giovanni Ciampoli. Thus he became familiar with Galileo's experimental methodology, which had a profound influence on him.

He served as chamberlain to Pope Gregory XV, and was confirmed in his post by his successor, Urban VIII and promoted to Chief Chamberlain. In the Accademia dei Lincei he served as a link between scientists who were working in different cities of Italy, and encouraged Galileo, who was facing criticism from conservative circles.

== Friendship with Galileo ==
In 1619, the Jesuit Orazio Grassi, writing under the pseudonym Lotario Sassi, published Libra Astronomica ac Philosophica, which attacked Galileo. In May 1622, Cesarini wrote to Galileo asking him to publish a reply to Sarsi, which he owed to the world to write. In October of the same year, Galileo's response, The Assayer, was ready. It was published the following year, in the form of a letter to Cesarini.

== See also ==
- Ferdinando Cesarini, Virginio Cesarini's brother.
