= List of encyclicals of Pope Pius X =

Pope Pius X issued 17 papal encyclicals during his reign as Pope:

No.	Title (Latin)	Title (English translation)	Subject	Date	Text
1.	E supremi	"On high"	On the Restoration of All things in Christ	4 October 1903	
2.	Ad diem illum laetissimum	"On that most happy day"	On the Immaculate Conception	2 February 1904	
3.	Iucunda sane		On Pope Gregory the Great	12 March 1904	
4.	Acerbo nimis	"At This Extremely Harsh (Time)"	On Teaching Christian Doctrine	15 April 1905	
5.	Il fermo proposito		On Catholic Action in Italy	11 June 1905	
6.	Vehementer Nos	"We with vehemence"	On the French Law of Separation	11 February 1906	
7.	Tribus circiter	"Circumscribed tribes"	On the Mariavites: Mystic Priests of Poland	5 April 1906	
8.	Pieni l'animo		On the Clergy in Italy	28 July 1906	
9.	Gravissimo officii munere		On French Associations of Worship	10 August 1906	
10.	Une fois encore		On the Separation of Church and State	6 January 1907	
11.	Pascendi dominici gregis	"The Feedings of the Flock of the Lord"	On the Doctrine of the Modernists	8 September 1907	
12.	Communium rerum	"Of Common Things"	On St. Anselm of Aosta	21 April 1909	
13.	Editae saepe		On St. Charles Borromeo	26 May 1910	
14.	Notre charge apostolique	“Our Apostolic Mandate”	On socialist doctrines of the Sillon movement	15 August 1910	
15.	Iamdudum	"Long since"	On the Law of Separation in Portugal	24 May 1911	
16.	Lacrimabili statu	"In a tearful state"	On the Indians of South America	7 June 1912	
17.	Singulari quadam		On Labour Organisations	24 September 1912	
