= Apostolatus =

Apostolatus may refer to:

- Cum ex apostolatus officio is the name of a papal bull issued by Pope Paul IV on February 15, 1559.
- E supremi apostolatus was a papal encyclical (On High) issued by Pope Pius X on October 4, 1903.
- In eminenti apostolatus was a Papal Bull issued by Pope Clement XII on 28 April 1738, banning Catholics from becoming Freemasons.
- In supremo apostolatus is a papal bull issued by Pope Gregory XVI regarding the institution of slavery.
- Societas Apostolatus Catholici is a name given to the Pallotines.
- Supremi apostolatus officio is an encyclical on the Rosary by Pope Leo XIII.
