= F. A. Forbes =

F. A. Forbes (16 March 1869 – 1936) was the pen name of Mother Frances Alice Monica Forbes, RSCJ, a member of the Society of the Sacred Heart from Scotland and a religious author.

== Biography ==
She was born in 1869 as Alice Forbes into a Presbyterian family. Her mother died when she was a child. In 1900 she became a Roman Catholic. Only a few months later, she entered the Society of the Sacred Heart, as a 31-year-old postulant.

She wrote numerous books, including brief biographies of Ignatius Loyola, John Bosco, Teresa of Ávila, Columba, Monica, Athanasius, Catherine of Siena, Benedict of Nursia, Hugh of Lincoln, Vincent de Paul, and, most famously, Pope Pius X. She died in 1936.

== Bibliography ==
- Saint Ignatius Loyola
- Saint Teresa of Ávila
- Life of St. Vincent de Paul
- Saint Athanasius: The Father of Orthodoxy (1919)
- Saint John Bosco
- Saint Columba
- Saint Monica
- Saint Catherine of Siena
- Saint Benedict
- Saint Hugh of Lincoln
- Pope Saint Pius X

== Writings ==
- "About the Author", Saint Teresa of Ávila, by F. A. Forbes, TAN Books and Publishers, Inc, 1917 (ISBN 0-89555-625-1)
