= Our Lady of Confidence =

1838 venerated image

La Madonna della Fiducia Our Lady of Confidence
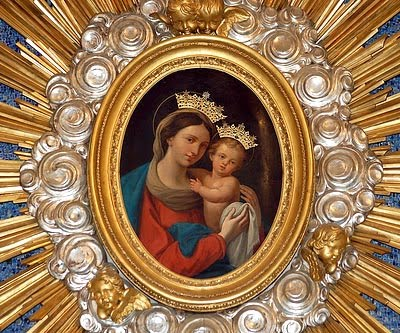
- Actual image within the chapel
- Location: Archbasilica of Saint John Lateran
- Date: 14 October 1838
- Witness: Pope Pius X
- Type: Oil painting
- Approval: Pope Gregory XVI
- Shrine: Papal Archbasilica of Saint John Lateran

Our Lady of Confidence, also known as La Madonna della Fiducia or Our Lady of Trust, is a venerated image of the Blessed Virgin Mary enshrined at the Lateran Basilica. The feast of Mary, Our Lady of Confidence falls on the last Saturday prior to Lent.

Pope Gregory XVI granted a canonical coronation to the image on 14 October 1838, via Cardinal Carlo Odescalchi, at the requested petition of the Roman seminarians. In addition, Pope Pius X was particularly devoted to Mary under this title.

== History ==
The image was originally painted by Carlo Maratta, who gave it to a young noblewoman, Chiara Isabella Fornari, who later became Abbess of the Convent of the Poor Clares in Todi, Italy. The image, was venerated in Todi under the Marian title "Refugium peccatorum", (English: “Refuge of Sinners”).

== Pontifical Major Seminary in Rome ==
The patroness of Rome's Major Seminary is the Blessed Virgin Mary under the title Madonna della Fiducia. The image of the Madonna that has been venerated for almost two centuries in the Roman Seminary depicts the Madonna and Child painted on a copper oval. It is a copy of the image at Todi, and noteworthy in that the child Jesus points to His mother, and Mary's intercession is typically invoked through the short prayer "Mater Mea, Fiducia Mea" (My Mother, My Confidence).

Originally, this Madonna was located at the chapel of St. Louis at the Jesuit Collegio Romano, where was known as "Our Lady of Confidence". When the Jesuits were suppressed in 1773, the college was given to the diocesan clergy for a seminary. It is believed she protected the seminarians from the Asiatic flu epidemic of 1837, which claimed many lives in Rome. In thanksgiving, the seminarians crowned Mother and Child with golden bejeweled diadems. In 1913, the Roman Seminary relocated to the Basilica of Saint John Lateran complex.

Pope John Paul II started the papal tradition of venerating this miraculous image each year; subsequently, Pope Benedict XVI carried on the tradition.

During his visit on the feast day of Our Lady of Confidence on 9 February 2002, Pope John Paul II ended his time at the seminary commenting on the devotion his predecessors had to Mary as Madonna della Fiducia, saying,

We heard how Our Lady of Confidence guided the steps of Pope John XXIII on a path that brought him from this Seminary to the Second Vatican Council, which was also a great seminary, the seminary of the bishops of the world. Let us thank Our Lady of Confidence for all that she did to assist Pope John XXIII in the preparation for and in the adventure of the Second Vatican Council. I wish all of you the grace to find her guidance in your lives: from the image of Our Lady of Confidence to the goals that Providence foresees for you and even asks of you to be accomplished through you. Once again, thank you for this wonderful evening. Many thanks.
