= Lacrimabili statu =

1912 encyclical by Pope Pius X

Lacrimabili statu Latin for 'In a tearful state' Encyclical of Pope Pius X
- Signature date: 7 June 1912
- Subject: Amazon forest Indigenous peoples of South America
- Number: 16 of 17 of the pontificate
- Text: In Latin

Lacrimabili statu is an encyclical written by Pope Pius X dated June 7, 1912 that condemned the exploitation of the natives of the Amazon rainforest.
