= Capriglia Irpina =

- Comune
- Comune di Capriglia Irpina
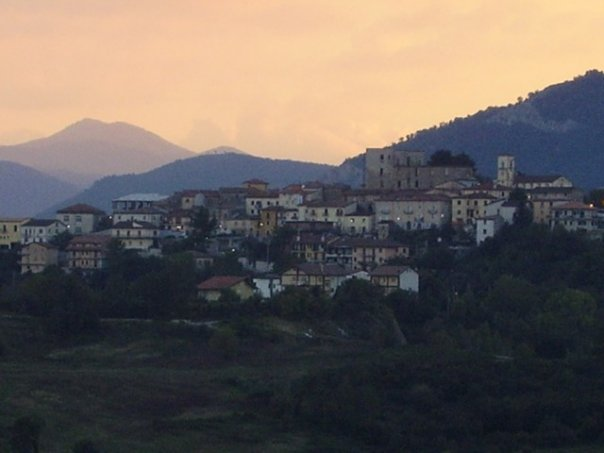

- Location within Italy Location within Campania
- Coordinates: 40°57′39″N 14°46′41″E
- Country: Italy
- Region: Campania
- Province: Avellino (AV)
- Frazioni: Breccelle I, Breccelle II, Casale, Marzano, Pozzo del Sale, San Felice, Spinielli,

Government
  - Mayor: Nunziante Picariello

Area
  - Total: 7.49 km^{2} (2.89 sq mi)
- Elevation: 575 m (1,886 ft)

Population (31 December 2017)
  - Total: 2,404
  - Density: 321/km^{2} (831/sq mi)
- Demonym: Caprigliesi
- Time zone: UTC+1 (CET)
  - Summer (DST): UTC+2 (CEST)
- Postal code: 83010
- Dialing code: 0825
- Patron saint: Saint Nicholas of Bari
- Saint day: 6 December
- Website: Official website

Capriglia Irpina is a town and comune in the province of Avellino, Campania, Italy.

== People ==
- Gian Pietro Carafa, Pope Paul IV
- Angelo Romano, politician
