= Pope Paul IV =

Head of the Catholic Church from 1555 to 1559

- Bishop of Rome
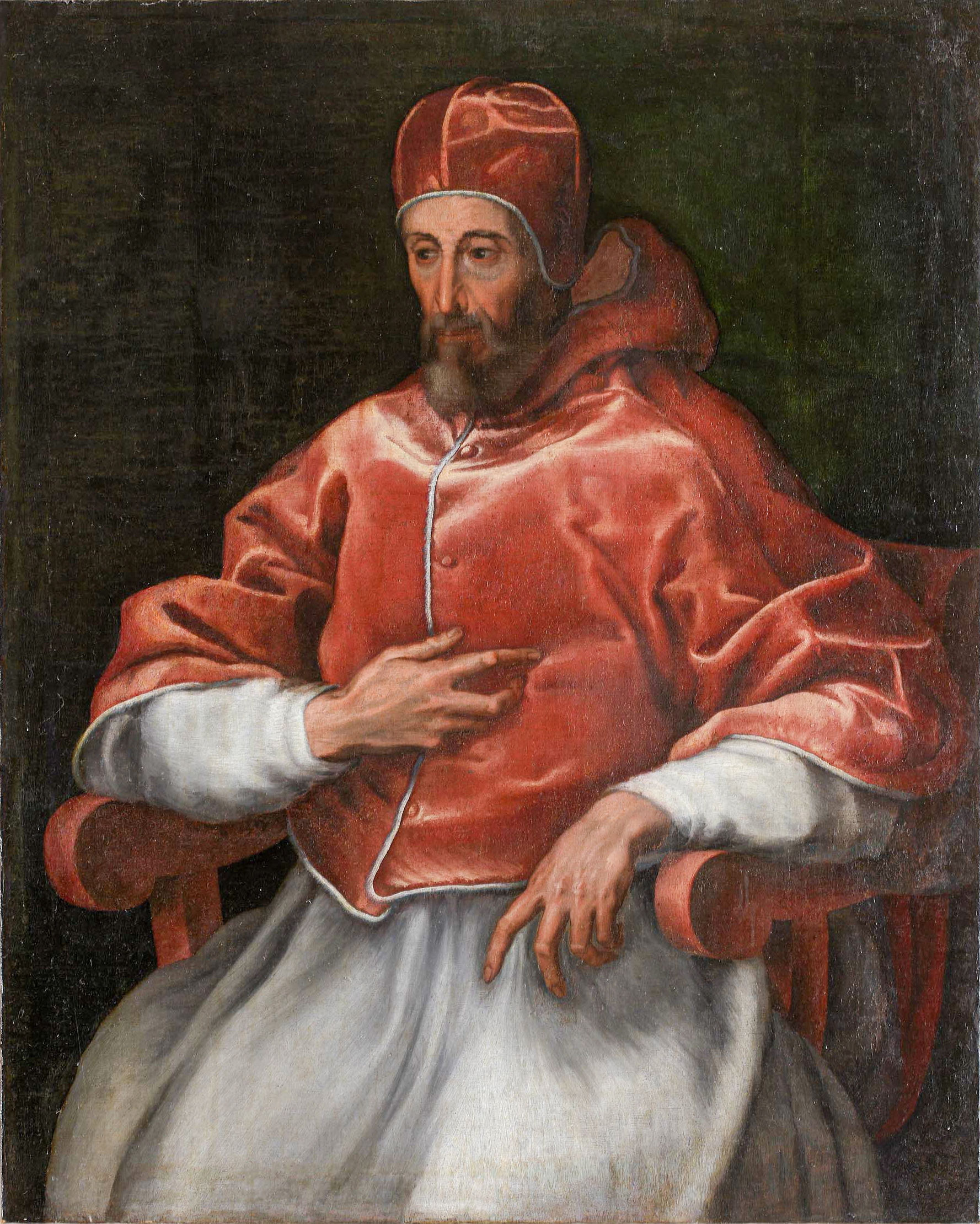
- Portrait by an unknown artist close to Jacopino del Conte, c. 1556 – c. 1560
- Church: Catholic Church
- Papacy began: 23 May 1555
- Papacy ended: 18 August 1559
- Predecessor: Marcellus II
- Successor: Pius IV
- Previous post: Cardinal-Priest of San Pancrazio fouri le Mura (1537)

Orders
- Ordination: 18 September 1506 by Cardinal Oliviero Carafa
- Consecration: 18 September 1505 by Cardinal Oliviero Carafa
- Created cardinal: 22 December 1536 by Pope Paul III

Personal details
- Born: Gian Pietro Carafa; 28 June 1476 Capriglia Irpina, Kingdom of Naples
- Died: 18 August 1559 (aged 83) Rome, Papal States
- Motto: Dominus mihi adjutor ("The Lord is my helper")

- Coat of arms

Papal styles of Pope Paul IV
- Reference style: His Holiness
- Spoken style: Your Holiness
- Religious style: Holy Father
- Posthumous style: None

Pope Paul IV (Latin: Paulus IV; Italian: Paolo IV; 28 June 1476 – 18 August 1559), born Gian Pietro Carafa, was head of the Catholic Church and leader of the Papal States from 23 May 1555 to his death, in August 1559. While serving as papal nuncio in Spain, he developed an anti-Spanish outlook that later coloured his papacy. In response to an invasion of part of the Papal States by Spain during his papacy, he called for a French military intervention. After a defeat of the French and with Spanish troops at the edge of Rome, the Papacy and Spain reached a compromise: French and Spanish forces left the Papal States and the Pope thereafter adopted a neutral stance between France and Spain.

Carafa was appointed bishop of Chieti, but resigned in 1524 in order to found with Saint Cajetan the Congregation of Clerics Regular (Theatines). Recalled to Rome, and made Archbishop of Naples, he worked to re-organise the Inquisitorial system in response to the emerging Protestant movement in Europe, any dialogue with which he opposed (the inquisition itself had been first instituted by Pope Innocent III who first regulated inquisitional procedure in the 13th century). Carafa was elected pope in 1555 through the influence of Cardinal Alessandro Farnese in the face of opposition from Charles V, Holy Roman Emperor.

His papacy was characterised by strong nationalism in reaction to the influence of Philip II of Spain and the Habsburgs. The appointment of Carlo Carafa as Cardinal Nephew damaged the papacy further, and scandals forced Paul to remove him from office. He curbed some clerical abuses in Rome, but his methods were seen as harsh. He would introduce the first modern Index Librorum Prohibitorum or "Index of Prohibited Books" banning works he saw as in error. In spite of his advanced age, he was a tireless worker and issued new decrees and regulations daily, unrelenting in his determination to keep Protestants and recently immigrated Marranos from gaining influence in the Papal States. Paul IV issued the Papal bull Cum nimis absurdum, which confined Jews in Rome to the neighbourhood claustro degli Ebrei ("enclosure of the Hebrews"), later known as the Roman Ghetto. He died highly unpopular, to the point that his family rushed his burial to make sure his body would not be desecrated by a popular uprising.

== Early life ==
Gian Pietro Carafa was born in Capriglia Irpina, near Avellino, into the prominent Carafa family of Naples. His father Giovanni Antonio of the Counts Carafa della Stadera died in West Flanders in 1516 and his mother Vittoria Camponeschi was the daughter of Pietro Lalle Camponeschi, 5th Count of Montorio, a Neapolitan nobleman, and Maria de Noronha, a Portuguese noblewoman of the House of Pereira.

== Church career ==
=== Bishop ===
He was mentored by Cardinal Oliviero Carafa, his relative, who resigned the see of Chieti (Latin Theate) in his favour. Under the direction of Pope Leo X, he was ambassador to England and then papal nuncio in Spain, where he conceived a violent detestation of Spanish rule that affected the policies of his later papacy.

In 1524, Pope Clement VII allowed Carafa to resign his benefices and join the ascetic and newly founded Congregation of Clerics Regular, popularly called the Theatines, after Carafa's see of Theate. Following the sack of Rome in 1527, the order moved to Venice. There, he wrote in a memorandum in 1533 that reform of the Church and vigorous struggle against any deviations were interlinked. Carafa was recalled to Rome by the reform-minded Pope Paul III (1534–49), to sit on a committee of reform of the papal court, an appointment that forecasted an end to a humanist papacy and a revival of scholasticism, as Carafa was a disciple of Thomas Aquinas.

=== Cardinal ===
In December 1536 he was made Cardinal-Priest of S. Pancrazio and then Archbishop of Naples.

The Regensburg Colloquy in 1541 failed to achieve any measure of reconciliation between Catholics and Protestants in Europe, but instead saw a number of prominent Italians defect to the Protestant camp. In response, Carafa was able to persuade Pope Paul III to set up a Roman Inquisition, modelled on the Spanish Inquisition with himself as one of the Inquisitors-General. The Papal Bull was promulgated in 1542. Carafa demanded the surveillance of education, ordered the confiscation of many authors, such as Erasmus, and inspired the warning of the Inquisition against printed books containing perceived threats against the Christianity. In this regard, he headed the commission that investigated the Bragadin-Giustiniani dispute and that recommended the burning of the Talmud in 1553.

=== Election as pope ===
He was a surprise choice as pope to succeed Pope Marcellus II (1555); his severe and unbending character combined with his advanced age and Italian patriotism meant under normal circumstances he would have declined the honor. He accepted apparently because Emperor Charles V was opposed to his accession.

Carafa, elected on 23 May 1555, took the name of "Paul IV" in honor of Pope Paul III who named him as a cardinal. He was crowned as pope on 26 May 1555 by the protodeacon. He formally took possession of the Basilica of Saint John Lateran on 28 October 1555.

== Papacy ==
=== Interior policy ===
As pope, Paul IV's nationalism was a driving force; he used the office to preserve some liberties in the face of fourfold foreign occupation. Like Pope Paul III, he was an enemy of the Colonna family. His treatment of Giovanna d'Aragona, who had married into that family, drew further negative comment from Venice because she had long been a patron of artists and writers.

Paul IV was violently opposed to the liberal Cardinal Giovanni Morone, whom he strongly suspected of being a hidden Protestant, so much that he had him imprisoned. In order to prevent Morone from succeeding him and imposing what he believed to be his Protestant beliefs on the Church, Pope Paul IV codified the Catholic Law excluding heretics and non-Catholics from receiving or legitimately becoming pope, in the bull Cum ex apostolatus officio.

Paul IV was rigidly orthodox, austere in life, and authoritarian in manner. He affirmed the Catholic doctrine of extra ecclesiam nulla salus ('outside the Church there is no salvation'), and used the Holy Office to suppress the Spirituali, a Catholic group deemed heretical. The strengthening of the Inquisition continued under Paul IV, and few could consider themselves safe by virtue of position in his drive to reform the Church; even cardinals he disliked could be imprisoned. He appointed inquisitor Michele Ghislieri, the future Pope Pius V, to the position of Supreme Inquisitor despite the fact as Inquisitor of Como, Ghislieri's persecutions had inspired a citywide rebellion, forcing him to flee in fear for his life. Paul IV also established a special committee to work on the Index Librorum Prohibitorum, a first draft of which was finished in 1557, that later served as basis for the first version promulgated by the Inquisition after his death in 1559.

Paul IV also begun a more radical and severe policy towards the Jews compared to the lenient papal legislation of the first half of the sixteenth century. As such, in the Papal States, especially in the seaport of Ancona, Marranos had thrived under benevolent popes Clement VII (1523–34), Paul III (1534–49), and Julius III (1550–55). These had even received a guarantee that if accused of apostasy they would be subject only to papal authority. Convinced that the papal policy of kindness had been abused by the Jews and not resulted in enough conversions, he enacted harsh restrictions and ended all dispensations to the Jews in the papal state, with the aim of encouraging the Jews to convert.

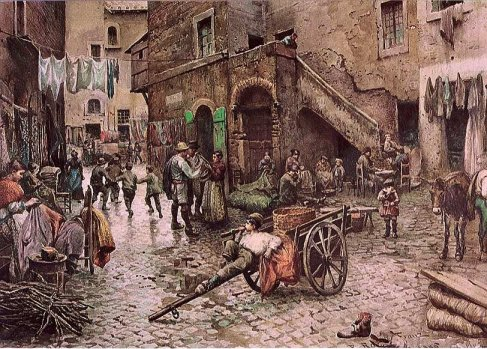
Vicolo Capocciuto, Roman Ghetto by Franz Roesler c.1880

The policy was formalised in his bull Cum nimis absurdum, which was issued on 17 July 1555 and where Paul IV explicitly declared that the Church had to adopt a policy that led Jews to converting. In the bull, Paul IV restricted the commercial activities and professions Jews could engage with, forbade them employing Christian servants and future ownership of real property while limiting their options to sell their own property. It further ordered that Jews had to wear distinctive yellow hats, especially outside the ghetto, and that Jews were forbidden to have more than one synagogue per city, resulting in Rome alone to the destruction of seven "excess" places of worship. Finally, the bull also ordered the creation of a Jewish ghetto in Rome. The Pope set its borders near the Rione Sant'Angelo, an area where large numbers of Jews already resided, and ordered it walled off from the rest of the city. A single gate, locked every day at sundown, was the only means of reaching the rest of the city. The Jews themselves were forced to pay all design and construction costs related to the project, which came to a total of roughly 300 scudi. In another reversal of previous papal policies, some hundred of the Marranos of Ancona were thrown into prison, 50 sentenced by the tribunal of the Inquisition and 25 Conversos who had reverted to Judaism were burned at the stake in the spring of 1556. Finally, the Inquisition prohibited in 1557 under his influence the Jews to possess any other religious work in Hebrew except for the Bible. Paul IV's policy was somewhat successful as the later sixteenth century saw a substantial increase in conversions from Jews to Christianity. By the end of his five-year reign, the number of Roman Jews had dropped by half. Yet his anti-Jewish legacy endured for over 300 years: the ghetto he established ceased to exist only with the dissolution of the Papal States in 1870. Its walls were torn down in 1888.

According to Leopold von Ranke, a rigid austerity and an earnest zeal for the restoration of primitive habits became the dominant tendency of his papacy. Monks who had left their monasteries were expelled from the city and from the Papal States. He would no longer tolerate the practice by which one man had been allowed to enjoy the revenues of an office while delegating its duties to another.

All begging was forbidden. Even the collection of alms for Masses, which had previously been made by the clergy, was discontinued. A medal was struck representing Christ driving the money changers from the Temple. Paul IV put in place a reform of the papal administration designed to stamp out trafficking of principal positions in the Curia. All secular offices, from the highest to the lowest, were assigned to others based on merit. Important economies were made, and taxes were proportionately remitted. Paul IV established a chest, of which only he held the key, for the purpose of receiving all complaints that anyone desired to make.

During his papacy, censorship reached new heights. Among his first acts as pope was to cut off Michelangelo's pension, and he ordered the nudes of The Last Judgment in the Sistine Chapel be painted more modestly (a request that Michelangelo ignored) (the beginning of the Vatican's Fig leaf campaign). Paul IV also introduced the Index Librorum Prohibitorum or "Index of Prohibited Books" to Venice, then an independent and prosperous trading state, in order to crack down on the growing threat of Protestantism. Under his authority, all books written by Protestants were banned, together with Italian and German translations of the Latin Bible.

=== Exterior policy ===
Paul IV was displeased at the French signing a five-year truce with Spain in February 1556 (in the midst of the Italian War of 1551–1559) and urged King Henry II of France to join the Papal States in an invasion of Spanish Naples. On 1 September 1556, King Philip II responded by preemptively invading the Papal States with 12,000 men under the Duke of Alba. French forces approaching from the north were defeated and forced to withdraw at Civitella del Tronto in August 1557. The Papal armies were left exposed and were defeated, with Spanish troops arriving at the edge of Rome. Out of fear of another sack of Rome, Paul IV agreed to the Duke of Alba's demand for the Papal States to declare neutrality by signing the Peace of Cave-Palestrina on 12 September 1557. Emperor Charles V criticised the peace agreement as being overly generous to the Pope.

Paul IV sought military alliances with the enemies of Charles V, whether Catholic, Protestant or Muslim, with the Ottoman Empire being particularly notable among them. When he sought an alliance with Henry II of France in 1555, the Pope proposed that the Franco-Ottoman fleet attacked the Emperor's Italian territories should the war draw near the Papal States. To this end, he even communicated with Sultan Suleiman the Magnificent through his cardinal-nephew, Cardinal Carlo Carafa. The Pope even contemplated launching a crusade with Ottoman assistance against the House of Habsburg. After entering the war in 1557, when the college of Cardinals disapproved oh his plans to ally with German protestants, the Pope called again to an Ottoman attack against Naples and Sicily. In march he defended that it would be "lawful and indeed praiseworthy for us to call the Turks, Moors, and Jews for our defense" against the Emperor.

His nephew Carlo became his uncle's chief political adviser. Having accepted a pension from the French, Cardinal Carafa worked to secure French and Ottoman alliances. Carlo's older brother Giovanni was made commander of the Papal forces and Duke of Paliano after the pro-Spanish Colonna were deprived of that town in 1556. Another nephew, Antonio, was given command of the Papal guard and made Marquis of Montebello. Their conduct became notorious in Rome. However, at the conclusion of the disastrous war with Philip II of Spain in the Italian War, and after many scandals, Paul IV publicly disgraced his nephews and banished them from Rome in 1559.

With the Protestant Reformation, the papacy required all Roman Catholic rulers to consider Protestant rulers as heretics, thus making their realms illegitimate. At the time of Paul's election, Queen Mary I of England was two years into her reign, and was rolling back the English Reformation that had occurred under her half-brother Edward VI. Paul IV issued a papal bull in 1555, Ilius, per quem Reges regnant, removing all Church measures against the English government, and further recognising Mary and her husband Philip as King and Queen of Ireland, rather than merely being "lord". Despite the bull, his relations with England were not positive. Paul IV had known Cardinal Reginald Pole while Pole was living in Italy and the two had been members of the spirituali together. Pole was the leader of Mary's efforts, but Paul IV seems to have hated Pole and become convinced he was a crypto-Protestant. Combined with hostility towards Spain and thus Mary's husband, Paul IV refused to allow any English bishops to be appointed, and began inquisitorial discipline proceedings against Pole, leading to the "farcical" situation that by 1558, the most serious opponent of English Catholicism was the Pope himself. He also angered people in England by insisting on the restitution of property confiscated during the dissolution of the monasteries. After Mary's death, he rejected the succession of Elizabeth I of England to the throne.

=== Consistories ===
Throughout his pontificate, Paul IV named 46 cardinals in four consistories, including Michele Ghislieri (the future Pope Pius V). According to Robert Maryks, the pope decided to nominate the Jesuit priest Diego Laynez to the cardinalate. However, Father Alfonso Salmerón warned Saint Ignatius of Loyola of this, as did Cardinal Otto Truchsess von Waldburg. In response, Father Pedro de Ribadeneira repeated what the saint had said to him: "If our Lord does not lay down his hand, we will have Master Laínez a cardinal, but I certify to you, if it were, that it be with so much noise that the world would understand how the Society accepts these things".

== Death ==
Paul IV's health began to break down in May 1559. He rallied in July, holding public audiences and attending meetings of the Inquisition. But he engaged in fasting, and the heat of the summer wore him down again. He was bedridden, and on 17 August it became clear he would not live. Cardinals and other officials gathered at his bedside on 18 August, where Paul IV asked them to elect a "righteous and holy" successor and to retain the Inquisition as "the very basis" of the Catholic Church's power. By 2 or 3 pm, he was close to death, and died at 5 pm.

The people of Rome did not forget what they had suffered because of the war he had brought on the State. Crowds of people gathered at the Piazza del Campidoglio and began rioting even before Paul IV died. His statue, erected before the Campidoglio just months before, had a yellow hat placed on it (similar to the yellow hat Paul IV had forced Jews to wear in public). After a mock trial, the statue was decapitated. It was then thrown into the Tiber.

The crowd broke into the three city jails and freed more than 400 prisoners, then broke into the offices of the Inquisition at the Palazzo dell' Inquisizone near to the Church of San Rocco. They murdered the Inquisitor, Tommaso Scotti, and freed 72 prisoners. One of those released was Dominican John Craig, who later was a colleague of John Knox. The people ransacked the palace, and then set it afire (destroying the Inquisition's records). That same day, or the next day (records are unclear), the crowd attacked the Church of Santa Maria sopra Minerva. The intercession of some local nobility dissuaded them from burning it and killing all those within. On the third day of rioting, the crowd removed the Carafa family coat of arms from all churches, monuments, and other buildings in the city.

The crowd dedicated to him the following pasquinata:

Carafa hated by the devil and the sky
is buried here with his rotting corpse,
Erebus has taken the spirit;
he hated peace on earth, our faith he contested.
he ruined the church and the people, men and sky offended;
treacherous friend, suppliant with the army which was fatal to him.
You want to know more? Pope was him and that is enough.

Such hostile views have not mellowed much with time; modern historians tend to view his papacy as an especially poor one. His policies stemmed from personal prejudices—against Spain, for example, or the Jews—rather than any overarching political or religious goals. In a time of precarious balance between Catholic and Protestant, his adversarial nature did little to slow the latter's spread across northern Europe. His anti-Spanish feelings alienated the Habsburgs, arguably the most powerful Catholic rulers in Europe, and his ascetic personal beliefs left him out of touch with the artistic and intellectual movements of his era (he often spoke of whitewashing the Sistine Chapel ceiling). Such a reactionary attitude alienated clergy and laity alike: historian John Julius Norwich calls him "the worst pope of the 16th century."

Four or five hours after his death, Paul IV's body was taken to the Cappella Paolina in the Apostolic Palace. It lay in repose, and a choir sang the Office of the Dead on the morning of 19 August. Cardinals and many others then paid homage to Paul IV ("kissed the feet of the pope"). The canons of St. Peter's Basilica refused to take his body into the basilica unless they were paid the customary money and gifts. Instead, the canons sang the usual office in the Cappella del Santissimo Sacramento (Chapel of the Blessed Sacrament). Paul IV's body was taken to the Sistine Chapel in the Apostolic Palace at 6 pm.

Paul IV's nephew, Cardinal-nephew Carlo Carafa, arrived in Rome late on 19 August. Worried that the rioters might break in and desecrate the pope's corpse, at 10 pm Cardinal Carafa had Pope Paul IV buried without ceremony next to the Cappella del Volto Santo (Chapel of the Holy Face) in St. Peter's. His remains stayed there until October 1566, when his successor as pope, Pius V, had them transferred to Santa Maria sopra Minerva. In the chapel founded by Paul IV's uncle and mentor, Cardinal Oliviero Carafa, a tomb was created by Pirro Ligorio and Paul IV's remains were placed therein.

== In fiction ==
Paul IV's title in the Prophecy of St. Malachy is "Of the Faith of Peter".

As Paul IV, appears as a character in John Webster's Jacobean revenge drama The White Devil (1612).

In the novel Q by Luther Blissett, while not appearing himself, Gian Pietro Carafa is mentioned repeatedly as the cardinal whose spy and agent provocateur, Qoelet, causes many of the disasters to befall Protestants during the Reformation and the Roman Church's response in the 16th century.

== See also ==
- Cardinals created by Paul IV

== Bibliography ==
- Aubert, Alberto. Paolo IV. Politica, Inquisizione e storiografia, Firenze, Le Lettere, 1999
- Baumgartner, Frederic J. “Henry II and the Papal Conclave of 1549.” The Sixteenth Century Journal 16, no. 3 (1985): 301–14. online.
- Booth, Ted W. "Elizabeth I and Pope Paul IV: Reticence and Reformation". Church History and Religious Culture 94.3 (2014): 316–336 online.
- Deming, David (2012). Science and technology in world history Vol. 3: The Black Death, the Renaissance, the Reformation and the Scientific Revolution. Jefferson, N.C.: McFarland & Co., Publishers. ISBN 9780786490868.
- Fichtner, Paula Sutter. “The Disobedience of the Obedient: Ferdinand I and the Papacy 1555-1564.” The Sixteenth Century Journal 11, no. 2 (1980): 25–34. online.
- Firpo, Massimo. Inquisizione romana e Controriforma. Studi sul cardinal Giovanni Morone (1509–1580) e il suo processo d'eresia, Brescia, Morcelliana, 2005
- Gleason, Elisabeth G. “Who Was the First Counter-Reformation Pope?” The Catholic Historical Review 81, no. 2 (1995): 173–84. online.
- Isom-Verhaaren, Christine (2011). Allies with the Infidel: The Ottoman and French Alliance in the Sixteenth Century. Bloomsbury Publishing. ISBN 9780857719737.
- Mampieri, Martina. "From Paul IV 'the Evil' to Pius IV 'the Merciful'". in Living under the Evil Pope (Brill, 2019). 160–204.
- Mathews, Shailer. "The Social Teaching of Paul. IV. The Messianism of Paul". Biblical World 19.4 (1902): 279–287 online.
- Loades, D. M. “THE NETHERLANDS AND THE ANGLO-PAPAL RECONCILIATION OF 1554.” Nederlands Archief Voor Kerkgeschiedenis / Dutch Review of Church History 60, no. 1 (1980): 39–55. online.
- Pattenden, Miles. Pius IV and the Fall of the Carafa: Nepotism and Papal Authority in Counter-Reformation Rome (Oxford UP, 2013).
- Pocock, Nicholas, Marinus Marinius, and J. Barengus. "Bull of Paul IV concerning the Bishopric of Bristol". English Historical Review 12.46 (1897): 303–307. JSTOR 547469.
- Raz-Krakotzkin, Amnon (6 August 2007). The Censor, the Editor, and the Text: The Catholic Church and the Shaping of the Jewish Canon in the Sixteenth Century. University of Pennsylvania Press. ISBN 978-0-8122-4011-5.
- Santosuosso, Antonio. "An Account of the Election of Paul IV to the Pontificate". Renaissance Quarterly 31.4 (1978): 486–498. JSTOR 2860374.
- Stow, Kenneth R. (1972). "The Burning of the Talmud in 1553, in the Light of Sixteenth Century Catholic Attitudes Toward the Talmud". Bibliothèque d'Humanisme et Renaissance. 34 (3): 435–459. ISSN 0006-1999.

Catholic Church titles
Preceded by Giovanni Salviati	Cardinal-bishop of Albano; 1544–1546	Succeeded by Ennio Filonardi
Preceded by Giovanni Salviati	Cardinal-bishop of Sabina; 1546–1550	Succeeded by François de Tournon
Preceded by Philippe de la Chambre	Cardinal-bishop of Frascati; 1550–1553	Succeeded by Jean du Bellay
Preceded by Giovanni Salviati	Cardinal-bishop of Porto; 1553	Succeeded by Jean du Bellay
Preceded by Giovanni Domenico de Cupi	Cardinal-bishop of Ostia; 1553–1555	Succeeded by Jean du Bellay
Preceded by Marcellus II	Pope; 23 May 1555 – 18 August 1559	Succeeded by Pius IV
