= Cum ex apostolatus officio =

1559 papal bull

Cum ex apostolatus officio Latin for 'By virtue of the Apostolic office' Papal bull of Pope Paul IV
- Signature date: 1559
- Subject: Measures against heretics

Cum ex apostolatus officio is the name of a papal bull issued by Pope Paul IV in 1559. The bull states that only Catholics can be elected popes, to the exclusion of non-Catholics, including former Catholics who have become public and manifest heretics.
