= Pope Pius X =

Head of the Catholic Church from 1903 to 1914

Pope Saint Pius X
- Bishop of Rome
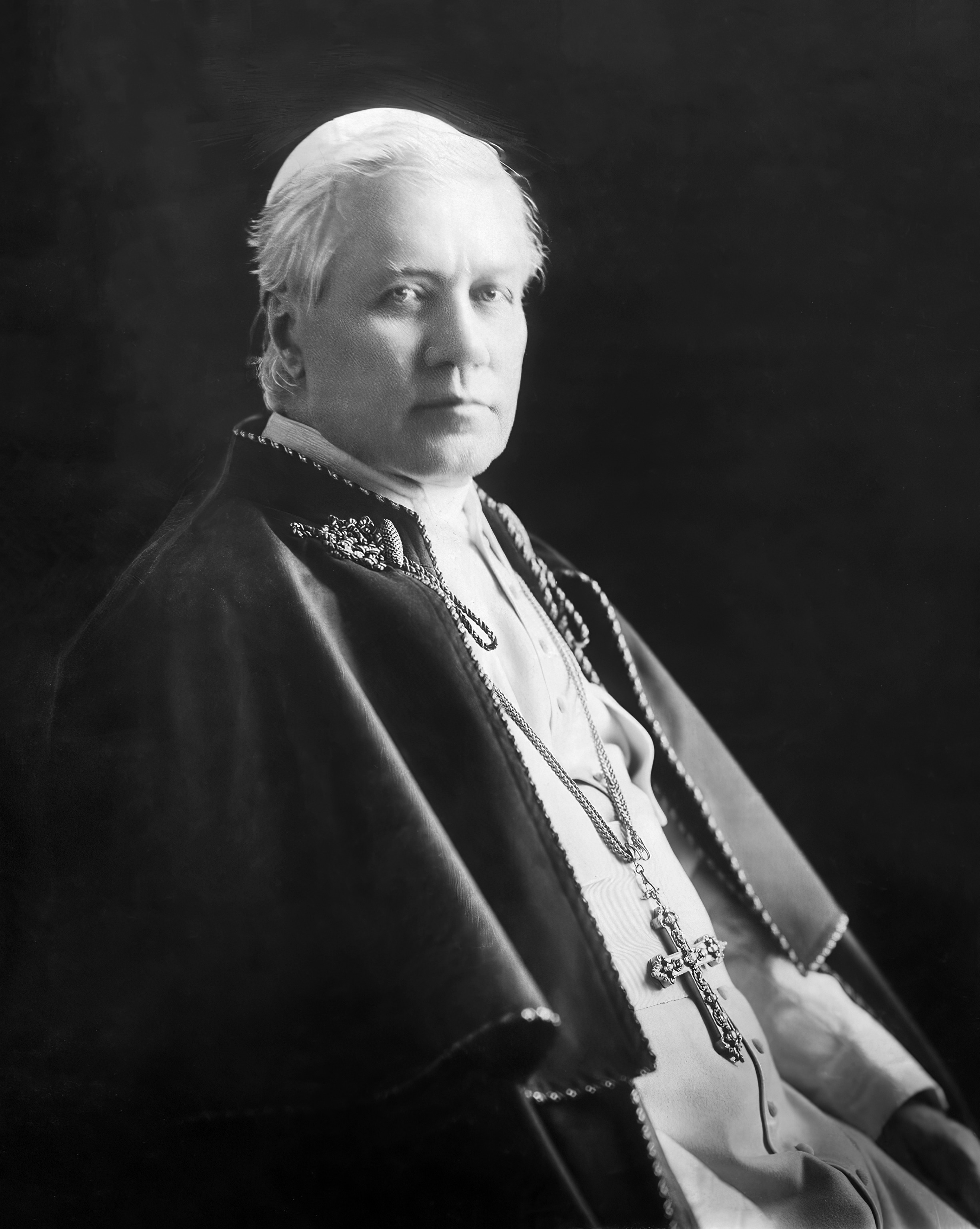
- Portrait by Ernest Walter Histed, c. 1914
- Church: Catholic Church
- Papacy began: 4 August 1903
- Papacy ended: 20 August 1914
- Predecessor: Leo XIII
- Successor: Benedict XV
- Previous posts: Archpriest of Salzano (1867‍–‍1875); Chancellor of the Diocese of Treviso (1875‍–‍1884); Vice-Capitular of Treviso (1879‍–‍1880); Bishop of Mantova (1884‍–‍1893); Patriarch of Venice (1893‍–‍1903); Cardinal Priest of San Bernardo alle Terme (1893‍–‍1903)

Orders
- Ordination: 18 September 1858 by Giovanni Antonio Farina
- Consecration: 16 November 1884 by Lucido Parocchi
- Created cardinal: 12 June 1893 by Leo XIII
- Rank: Cardinal priest

Personal details
- Born: Giuseppe Melchiorre Sarto; 2 June 1835 Riese, Lombardy–Venetia, Austrian Empire
- Died: 20 August 1914 (aged 79) Apostolic Palace, Rome, Italy
- Motto: Instaurare omnia in Christo (Latin for 'To restore all things in Christ')
- Signature: Pius X's signature

- Coat of arms: Pius X's coat of arms

Sainthood
- Feast day: 21 August; 3 September (General Roman Calendar 1955–1969)
- Venerated in: Catholic Church
- Title as Saint: Confessor
- Beatified: 3 June 1951; St. Peter's Basilica, Vatican City by Pope Pius XII
- Canonized: 29 May 1954; St. Peter's Basilica, Vatican City by Pope Pius XII
- Patronage: Catechists; Pilgrims; Emigrants from Treviso; First Communicants; Diocese of Des Moines; Archdiocese of Atlanta; Diocese of Great Falls-Billings; Archdiocese of Kottayam; Santa Luċija, Malta; Diocese of Springfield-Cape Girardeau, Missouri; Archdiocese of Zamboanga; Patriarchate of Venice; St. Pius X Seminary; Society of Saint Pius X

Ordination history
History
Diaconal ordination
- Date: 27 February 1858
Priestly ordination
- Ordained by: Giovanni Antonio Farina
- Date: 18 September 1858
Episcopal consecration
- Principal consecrator: Lucido Parocchi
- Co-consecrators: Pietro Rota; Giovanni Maria Berengo
- Date: 16 November 1884
Cardinalate
- Elevated by: Pope Leo XIII
- Date: 13 June 1893
Episcopal succession
Bishops consecrated by Pope Pius X as principal consecrator
- Francesco Cherubin: 20 August 1899
- Giacomo Maria Radini-Tedeschi: 29 January 1905
- Lajos Balás de Sipek: 21 December 1905
- Ottokár Prohászka: 21 December 1905
- Gyula Zichy: 21 December 1905
- Charles du Pont de Ligonnès: 25 February 1906
- Pierre Dadolle: 25 February 1906
- Marie-Joseph Ollivier: 25 February 1906
- Adrien-Alexis Fodéré: 25 February 1906
- Eugène-François Touzet: 25 February 1906
- François-Léon Gauthey: 25 February 1906
- Charles-Paul Sagot du Vauroux: 25 February 1906
- Charles-Henri-Célestin Gibier: 25 February 1906
- Jean Victor Émile Chesnelong: 25 February 1906
- François-Xavier-Marie-Jules Gieure: 25 February 1906
- Félix-Adolphe-Camille-Jean-Baptiste Guillibert: 25 February 1906
- Alcime-Armand-Pierre-Marie Gouraud: 25 February 1906
- Jacques-Jean Gely: 25 February 1906
- Giacomo della Chiesa: 22 December 1907
- Gaetano De Lai: 17 December 1911
- Adam Stefan Sapieha: 17 December 1911
- Pie Armand Pierre Sabadel: 17 December 1911

Pope Pius X (Italian: Pio X; born Giuseppe Melchiorre Sarto; (Note: Italian: [dʒuˈzɛppe melˈkjɔrre ˈsarto]; English: Joseph Melchior Sarto) 2 June 1835 – 20 August 1914) was head of the Catholic Church from 4 August 1903 until his death in August 1914. He opposed modernist interpretations of Catholic doctrine, and promoted liturgical reforms and Thomist scholastic theology. He initiated the preparation of the 1917 Code of Canon Law, the first comprehensive and systemic work of its kind, which was ultimately promulgated by his successor. He is venerated as a saint in the Catholic Church.

Born in the Austrian Empire to a poor family, Pius X was devoted to the Blessed Virgin Mary under the title of Our Lady of Confidence, while his papal encyclical Ad diem illum took on a sense of renewal that was reflected in the motto of his pontificate. He advanced the Liturgical Movement by formulating the principle of participatio actuosa (active participation of the faithful) in his motu proprio, Tra le sollecitudini (1903). He encouraged the frequent reception of Holy Communion, and he lowered the age for First Communion, which would become a lasting innovation of his papacy.

Like his predecessors, Pius X promoted Thomism as the principal philosophical method to be taught in Catholic institutions. He opposed various 19th-century philosophies that he viewed as an intrusion of secular errors incompatible with Catholic dogma, especially modernism, which he critiqued as the synthesis of every heresy.

Pius X was known for his firm demeanour and sense of personal poverty, reflected by his membership of the Third Order of Saint Francis. He regularly gave sermons from the pulpit, a rare practice at the time. (Note: Prior to the changes of the Second Vatican Council, the celebration of the Mass did not always necessitate a sermon or homily.) After the 1908 Messina earthquake, he filled the Apostolic Palace with refugees, long before the Italian government acted. He rejected any kind of favours for his family, and his close relatives chose to remain in poverty, living near Rome. He also undertook a reform of the Roman Curia with the Apostolic Constitution Sapienti consilio in 1908.

After his death, a strong cult of devotion followed his reputation for piety and holiness. He was beatified in 1951 and canonized in 1954 by Pope Pius XII. A statue bearing his name stands within Saint Peter's Basilica, and his birth town was renamed Riese Pio X after his death.

== Early life and ministry ==
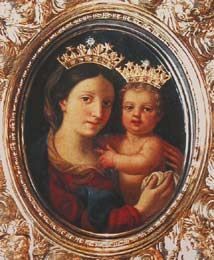
The Marian image of Our Lady of Confidence, for whom Pius had a devotion

Giuseppe Melchiorre Sarto was born in Riese, Kingdom of Lombardy–Venetia, Austrian Empire (now in the province of Treviso, Veneto, Italy), on 2 June 1835. He was the second born of ten children of Giovanni Battista Sarto (1792–1852), the village postman, and Margherita Sanson (1813–1894). He was baptised 3 June 1835. Though poor, his parents valued education, and Giuseppe walked 6 kilometres (3.7 mi) to school each day.

Giuseppe had three brothers and six sisters: Giuseppe Sarto (born 1834; died after six days), Angelo Sarto (1837–1916), Teresa Parolin-Sarto (1839–1920), Rosa Sarto (1841–1913), Antonia Dei Bei-Sarto (1843–1917), Maria Sarto (1846–1930), Lucia Boschin-Sarto (1848–1924), Anna Sarto (1850–1926), Pietro Sarto (born 1852; died after six months). As Pope, he rejected any kind of favours for his family: his brother remained a postal clerk, his favourite nephew stayed on as village priest, and his three single sisters lived together in humble circumstances in Rome.

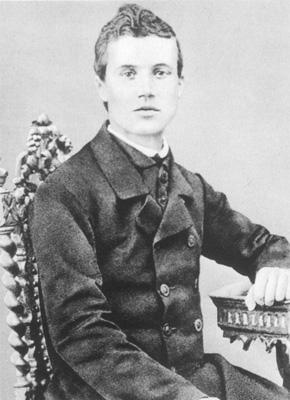
A young Giuseppe Sarto

Giuseppe was an excellent student who focused on homework before hobbies or recreations. In the evenings after sports or games with friends, he would spend ten minutes in prayer before returning home. He also served as an altar boy. By the age of ten, he had completed the two elementary classes of his village school; henceforth he had to walk four miles to the gymnasium in Castelfranco Veneto for further classes. For the next four years, he would attend Mass before breakfast and his long walk to school.

In 1850, Sarto received the tonsure from his parish priest, who wrote to the Cardinal of Venice to secure Sarto a scholarship to the Seminary of Padua, "where he finished his classical, philosophical, and theological studies with distinction".

On 18 September 1858, Sarto was ordained a priest by Giovanni Antonio Farina, Bishop of Treviso (later canonized), and became a chaplain at Tombolo. While there, Sarto expanded his knowledge of theology, studying Thomas Aquinas and canon law, while carrying out most of the functions of the sickly parish priest Constantini. Often, Sarto sought to improve his sermons by the advice of Constantini, who referred to one of his earliest as "rubbish". In Tombolo, Sarto's reputation for holiness grew so much that some of the people call him "Don Sarto".

In 1867, Sarto was named archpriest of Salzano. He restored the local church and expanded the hospital, the funds coming from his own begging, wealth and labour. He won the people's affection when he worked to assist the sick during the cholera outbreak of the early 1870s. He was appointed a canon of the cathedral and chancellor of the Diocese of Treviso, also acting as spiritual director and rector of the Treviso seminary and examiner of the clergy. As chancellor he made it possible for public school students to receive religious instruction. As a priest and later bishop, he often struggled to bring religious instruction to rural and urban youth who could not attend Catholic schools. At one stage, a large stack of hay caught fire near a cottage, and when Sarto arrived he addressed the frantic people, "Don't be afraid, the fire will be put out and your house will be saved!" At that moment, the flames turned in the other direction, sparing the cottage. Despite his many duties, Sarto often made time for an evening walk with children preparing for their First Communion.

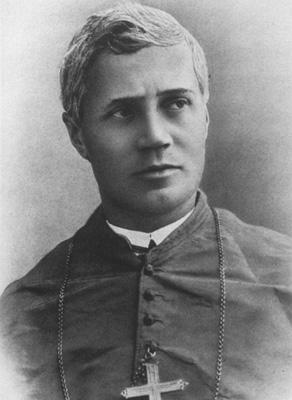
Sarto as bishop

In 1879, Bishop Federico Maria Zinelli died, and Sarto was elected vicar capitular to care for the diocese until the installation of a new bishop in June 1880.

After 1880, Sarto taught dogmatic theology and moral theology at the seminary in Treviso. On 10 November 1884, he was appointed bishop of Mantua by Pope Leo XIII. He was consecrated six days later in Rome in the church of Sant'Apollinare alle Terme Neroniane-Alessandrine, Rome, by Cardinal Lucido Parocchi, assisted by Pietro Rota, and by Giovanni Maria Berengo. He was appointed to the honorary position of assistant at the pontifical throne on 19 June 1891. Sarto required papal dispensation from Pope Leo XIII before episcopal consecration as he lacked a doctorate, making him the last pope without a doctorate until Pope Francis.

When Sarto travelled back to his hometown from Rome after his consecration, he immediately went to visit his mother. There, she repeatedly kissed his ring and said to him: "But you would not have this fine ring, son, if I did not have this", showing him her wedding ring.

== Cardinalate and patriarchate ==
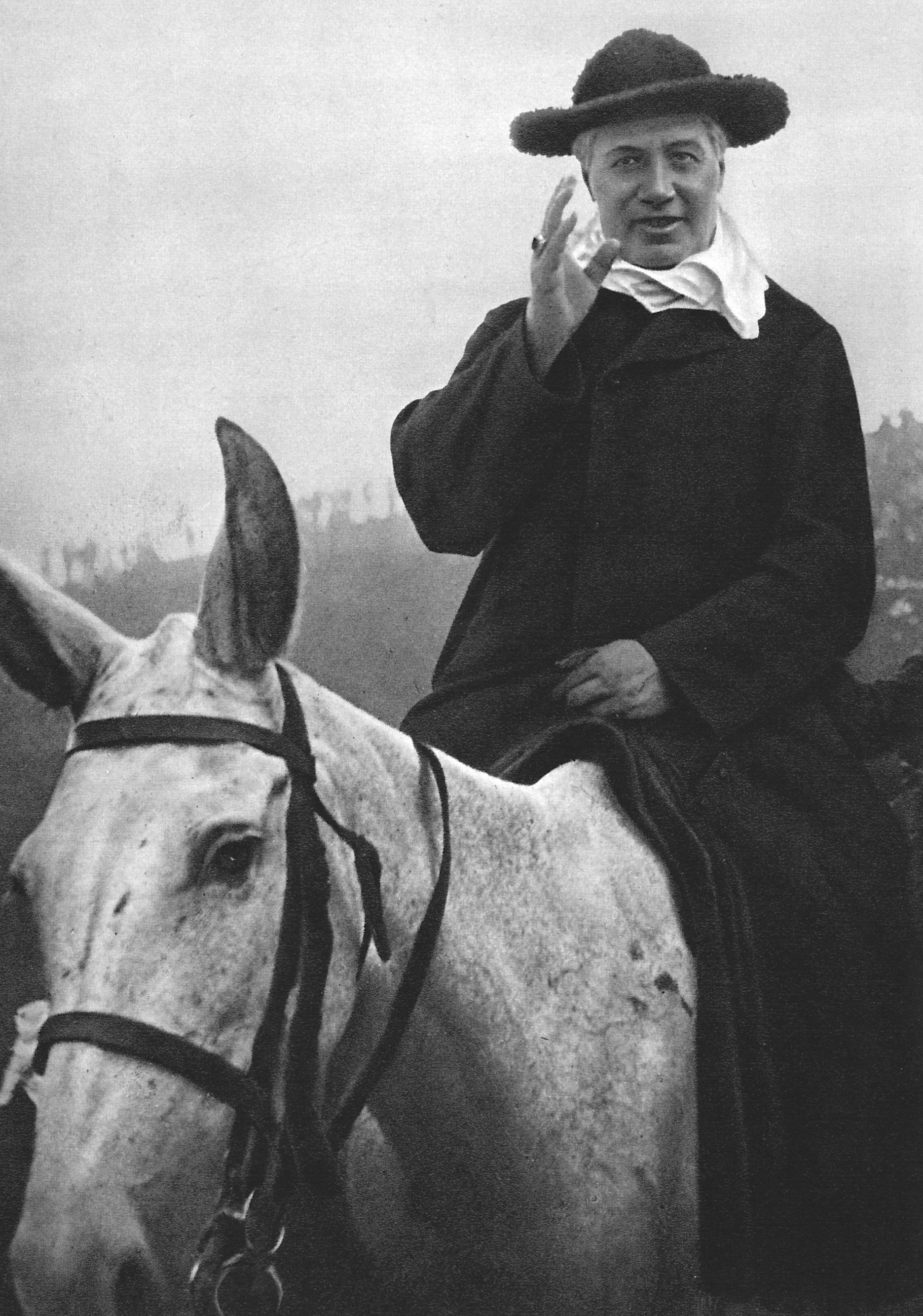
Sarto riding a horse in 1901 as a cardinal

Pope Leo XIII made Sarto a cardinal of the order of cardinal priests in a secret consistory on 12 June 1893. In a public consistory on 15 June, the Pope gave him his cardinal's red galero, assigned him the titular church of San Bernardo alle Terme, and appointed him Patriarch of Venice. This caused difficulty, however, as the government of reunified Italy claimed the right to nominate the Patriarch, since the previous sovereign, the Emperor of Austria, had exercised that power. The poor relations between the Roman Curia and the Italian civil government since the annexation of the Papal States in 1870 placed additional strain on the appointment. The number of vacant sees soon grew to 30. Sarto was finally permitted to assume the position of patriarch in 1894. In regard to being named as a cardinal, Sarto told a local newspaper that he felt "anxious, terrified and humiliated".

After being named cardinal and before leaving for Venice, he visited his mother. Overwhelmed with emotion, she asked: "My son, give your mother a last blessing", sensing that it would be the last time that they would see each other. Arriving in Venice, he was formally enthroned on 24 November 1894.

As cardinal-patriarch, Sarto avoided politics, allocating his time to social works and strengthening parochial credit unions. However, in his first pastoral letter to the Venetians, Sarto argued that in matters pertaining to the Pope, "There should be no questions, no subtleties, no opposing of personal rights to his rights, but only obedience."

In April 1903, Pope Leo XIII reportedly said to Lorenzo Perosi: "Hold him very dear, Perosi, as in the future he will be able to do much for you. We firmly believe he will be our successor". As a cardinal, he was considered by the time of his papal election as one of the most prominent preachers in the Church despite his lesser fame globally. In his role as a cardinal, Sarto held membership in the congregations for Bishops and Regulars, Rites, and Indulgences and Sacred Relics.

== Papal election of 1903 ==
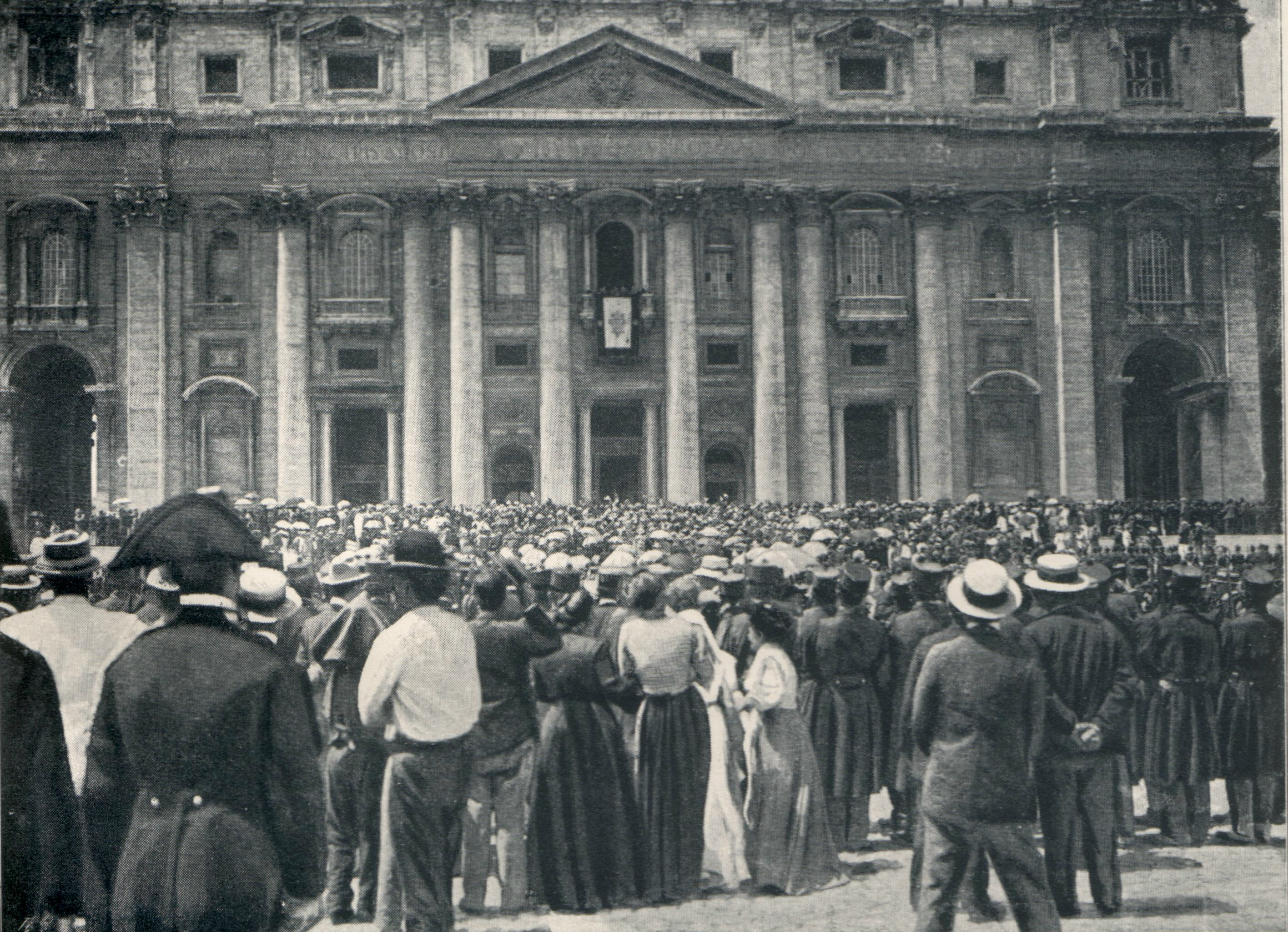
Cardinal Luigi Macchi announces the election of Sarto as Pope Pius X.

Pope Leo XIII died 20 July 1903, and at the end of that month the conclave convened to elect his successor. Before the conclave, Sarto had reportedly said, "rather dead than pope", when people discussed his chances for election. In one of the meetings held just before the conclave, Cardinal Victor-Lucien-Sulpice Lécot spoke with Sarto in French, however, Sarto replied in Latin, "I'm afraid I do not speak French". Lécot replied, "But if Your Eminence does not speak French you have no chance of being elected because the Pope must speak French", to which Sarto said, "Deo Gratias! I have no desire to be pope".

According to historians, the favorite was the late pope's secretary of state, Cardinal Mariano Rampolla. On the first ballot, Rampolla received 24 votes, Gotti had 17 votes, and Sarto five votes. On the second ballot, Rampolla had gained five votes, as did Sarto. The next day, it seemed that Rampolla would be elected. However, the Polish cardinal Jan Puzyna de Kosielsko from Kraków, in the name of Emperor Franz Joseph (1848–1916) of Austria-Hungary, attempted a veto (jus exclusivae) against Rampolla's election, though he had not yet secured the necessary votes.

By the time of the veto attempt, the third vote had already begun, resulting in no clear winner but increasing support for Sarto, with 21 votes. The fourth vote showed Rampolla with 30 votes and Sarto with 24. The following morning, the fifth vote gave Rampolla 10 votes, Gotti two and Sarto 50. Thus, on 4 August 1903, Sarto was elected to the pontificate. At first, it is reported, Sarto declined the selection, feeling unworthy. He had been deeply saddened by the Austro-Hungarian veto attempt and reportedly vowed to excommunicate anyone who communicated such a veto in the future. With the cardinals asking him to reconsider his decline of the papacy, he went into solitude in the Pauline Chapel, and after deep prayer accepted the position. Cardinal Luigi Macchi announced Sarto's election at around 12:10pm.

Sarto took as his papal name Pius X, out of respect for his recent predecessors of the same name, particularly Pope Pius IX (1846–1878), who had fought against theological liberals and for papal supremacy. He explained: "As I shall suffer, I shall take the name of those Popes who also suffered". Pius X's traditional coronation took place the following Sunday, 9 August 1903. As pope, he became ex officio Grand Master of the Equestrian Order of the Holy Sepulchre of Jerusalem, prefect of the Supreme Sacred Congregation of the Holy Office, and prefect of the Sacred Consistorial Congregation.

== Pontificate ==
Papal styles of Pope Pius X
- Reference style: His Holiness
- Spoken style: Your Holiness
- Religious style: Holy Father
- Posthumous style: Saint

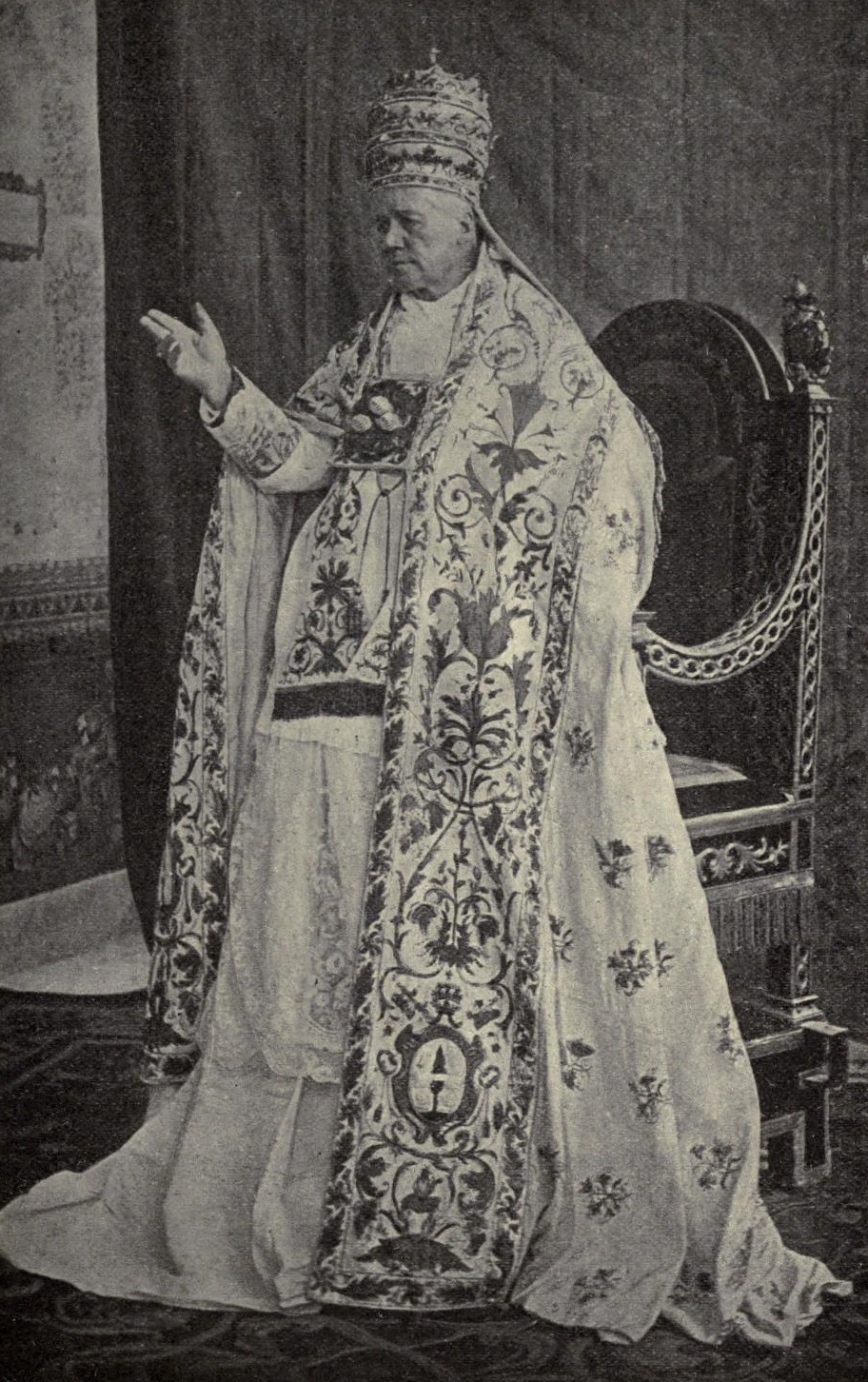
1904 portrait of Pope Pius X wearing papal regalia

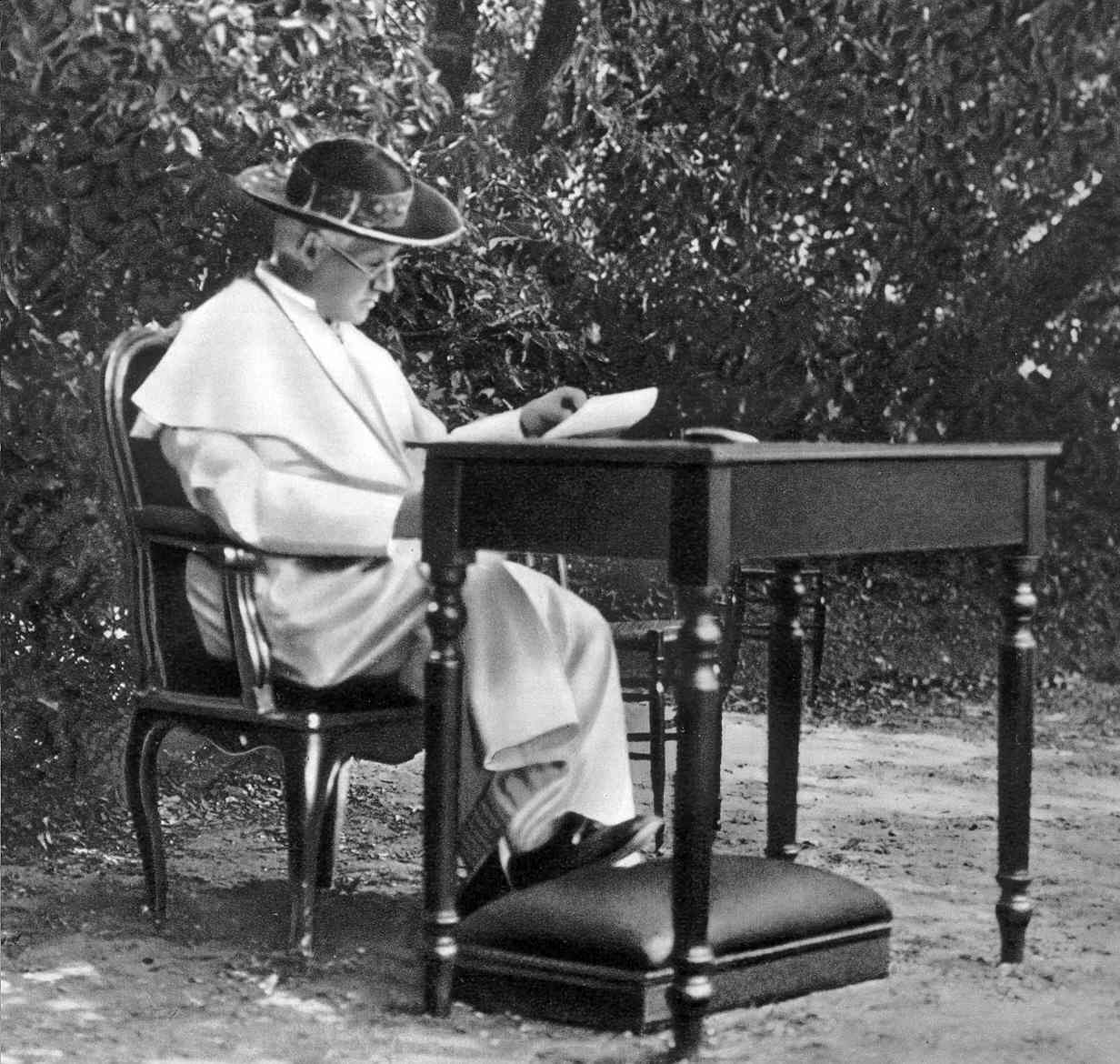
Pope Pius X in the Vatican Gardens in July 1913

The pontificate of Pius X was noted for traditional theology and reforms in liturgy and Church law. In what became his motto, the Pope in 1903 devoted his papacy to Instaurare Omnia in Christo, "to restore all things in Christ." In his first encyclical (E supremi apostolatus, 4 October 1903), he stated his overriding policy: "We champion the authority of God. His authority and Commandments should be recognized, deferred to, and respected."

Continuing his simple origins, Pius wore a pectoral cross of gilded metal on the day of his coronation; when his entourage was horrified, the new pope declared he always wore it and had brought no other with him. He was well known for reducing papal ceremonies. He also abolished the custom of the Pope dining alone, since the time of Pope Urban VIII, and invited his friends to eat with him. (Note: Pope Pius XI revived the practice of dining alone during his pontificate but no other successor of Pius X is known to have followed this custom.)

When chided by Rome's social leaders for refusing to make his peasant sisters papal countesses, he responded: "I have made them sisters of the Pope; what more can I do for them?"

Pius developed a reputation for being very friendly with children. He carried candy in his pockets for the street urchins in Mantua and Venice, and taught them catechism. During papal audiences, he would gather children around him and talk about things that interested them. His weekly catechism lessons in the courtyard of San Damaso in the Vatican always included a special place for children, and his decision to require the Confraternity of Christian Doctrine in every parish was partly motivated by a desire to save children from religious ignorance.

Noted for his humility and simplicity, Pius declared that he had not changed personally save for his white cassock. Aides consistently needed to remind him not to wipe his pen on the white cassock, as he had previously done on his black cassock which hid stains. The new pope's schedule was quite similar each day. He rose at 4:00am before celebrating Mass at 6:00am. He was at his desk at 8:00am to receive private audiences. On his desk stood statues of John Vianney and Joan of Arc, both of whom he beatified in his papacy. At noon, he conducted a general audience with pilgrims, then had lunch at 1:00pm with his two secretaries or whomever else he invited to dine with him. Resting for a short while after lunch, Pius X would then return to work before dining at 9:00pm and a final stint of work before sleep.

=== Church reforms and theology ===
==== Restoration in Christ and Mariology ====
In his 1904 encyclical Ad diem illum, Pius describes Mary in the context of "restoring everything in Christ".

He wrote:

Spiritually we all are her children and she is the mother of us, therefore, she is to be revered like a mother. Christ is the Word made Flesh and the Savior of mankind. He had a physical body like every other man: and as savior of the human family, he had a spiritual and mystical body, the Church. This, the Pope argues has consequences for our view of the Blessed Virgin. She did not conceive the Eternal Son of God merely that He might be made man taking His human nature from her, but also, by giving him her human nature, that He might be the Redeemer of men. Mary, carrying the Savior within her, also carried all those whose life was contained in the life of the Savior. Therefore, all the faithful united to Christ, are members of His body, of His flesh, and of His bones from the womb of Mary like a body united to its head. Through a spiritual and mystical fashion, all are children of Mary, and she is their Mother. Mother, spiritually, but truly Mother of the members of Christ (S. Aug. L. de S. Virginitate, c. 6).

During Pius X's pontificate, many famed Marian images were granted a canonical coronation: Our Lady of Aparecida, Our Lady of the Pillar, Our Lady of the Cape, Our Lady of Chiquinquira of Colombia, Our Lady of San Juan de los Lagos, Our Lady of La Naval de Manila, Virgin of Help of Venezuela, Our Lady of Carmel of New York, the Marian icon of Santuario della Consolata and the Immaculate Conception within the Chapel of the Choir inside Saint Peter's Basilica were granted this prestigious honor.

=== Tra le sollecitudini and Gregorian chant ===
Within three months of his coronation, Pius X published his motu proprio Tra le sollecitudini. Classical and Baroque compositions had long been favoured over Gregorian chant in ecclesiastical music. The Pope announced a return to earlier musical styles, championed by Lorenzo Perosi. Since 1898, Perosi had been Director of the Sistine Chapel Choir, a title which Pius X upgraded to "Perpetual Director". The Pope's choice of Joseph Pothier to supervise the new editions of chant led to the official adoption of the Solesmes edition of Gregorian chant.

=== Liturgical reforms and communion ===
Pius X worked to increase devotion among both clergy and laity, particularly in the Breviary, which he reformed considerably, and the Mass.

Besides restoring to prominence Gregorian chant, he placed a renewed liturgical emphasis on the Eucharist, saying, "Holy Communion is the shortest and safest way to Heaven." To this end, he encouraged frequent reception of Holy Communion. This also extended to children who had reached the "age of discretion", though he did not permit the ancient Eastern practice of infant communion. He also emphasized frequent recourse to the Sacrament of Penance so that Holy Communion would be received worthily. Pius X's devotion to the Eucharist would eventually earn him the honorific of "Pope of the Blessed Sacrament", by which he is still known among his devotees.

In 1910, he issued the decree Quam singulari, which changed the age at which Communion could be received from 12 to 7 years old, the age of discretion. The Pope lowered the age because he wished to impress the event on the minds of children and stimulate their parents to new religious observance; this decree was found unwelcome in some places due to the belief that parents would withdraw their children early from Catholic schools, now that First Communion was carried out earlier. Pius X even personally distributed First Communion to a four-year-old boy the day after the child was presented to him and demonstrated an exceptional understanding of the meaning of the sacrament. When people would criticize Pius X for lowering the age of reception, he simply quoted the words of Jesus, "let the little children come to me".

Pius X said in his 1903 motu proprio Tra le sollecitudini, "The primary and indispensable source of the true Christian spirit is participation in the most holy mysteries and in the public, official prayer of the Church."

He also sought to modify papal ceremonies to underscore their religious significance by eliminating occasions for applause. For example, when entering his first public consistory for the creation of cardinals in November 1903, he was not carried above the crowds on the sedia gestatoria as was traditional. He arrived on foot wearing a cope and mitre at the end of the procession of prelates "almost hidden behind the double line of Palatine Guards through which he passed".

=== Opposition to modernism ===
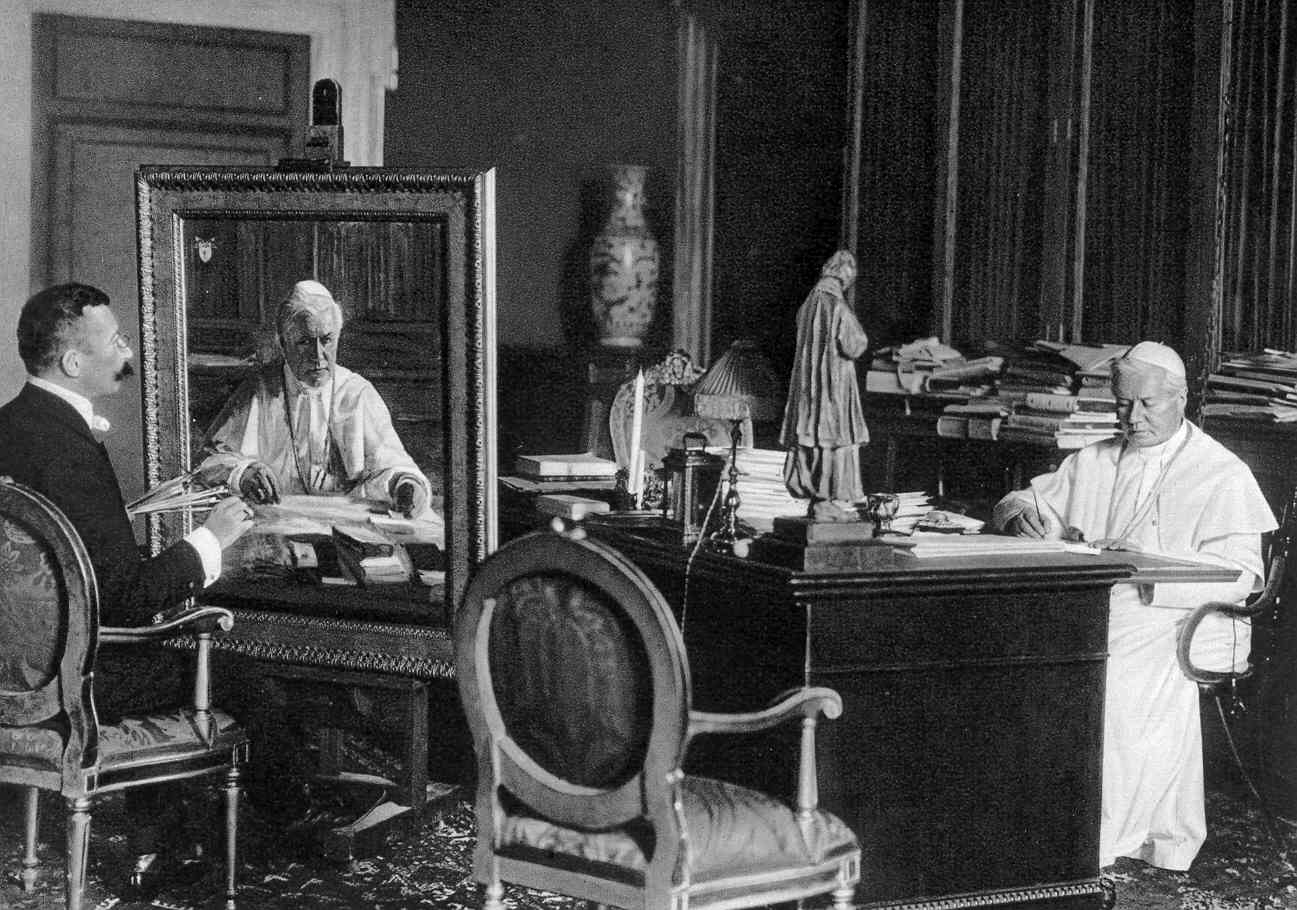
Pius X in his study while receiving a portrait. Nearby is a statue of John Vianney.

Pope Leo XIII had sought to revive the inheritance of Thomas Aquinas, "the marriage of reason and revelation", as a response to secular Enlightenment. Under Pius X, neo-Thomism became the blueprint for theology.

Pius X vigorously condemned the theological movement he termed "Modernism", which he regarded as a heresy endangering the Catholic faith. The movement was linked especially to certain Catholic French scholars such as Louis Duchesne, who applied modern critical methods to Church history, drawing together archaeology and topography to supplement literature and setting ecclesiastical events with contexts of social history. Alfred Loisy, a student of Duchesne, denied that some parts of Scripture were literally rather than metaphorically true. In contradiction to Thomas Aquinas, they argued that there was an unbridgeable gap between natural and supernatural knowledge. From the traditional viewpoint, such investigations led inevitably to relativism and scepticism. The modernist and relativist theological trends tried to assimilate modern philosophers like Immanuel Kant as well as rationalism into Catholic theology.

Anti-Modernists viewed these notions as contrary to the dogmas and traditions of the Catholic Church. In the decree entitled Lamentabili sane exitu ("A Lamentable Departure Indeed") of 3 July 1907, Pius X formally condemned 65 propositions, mainly drawn from the works of Alfred Loisy and concerning the nature of the Church, revelation, biblical exegesis, the sacraments, and the divinity of Christ. That was followed by the encyclical Pascendi Dominici gregis (or "Feeding the Lord's Flock"), which characterized Modernism as the "synthesis of all heresies."

Escalating the campaign, Pius X ordered that all clerics take the Anti-Modernist oath, Sacrorum antistitum. The Pope's aggressive stance against Modernism caused some disruption within the Church, although only about 40 clerics refused to take the oath. Catholic scholarship with Modernist tendencies was greatly discouraged, and theologians who wished to pursue lines of inquiry in line with Secularism, Modernism, or Relativism were threatened with sanctions up to excommunication.

Pius X's attitude towards Modernists was uncompromising. He also instituted the Sodalitium Pianum (or League of Pius V), an anti-Modernist network of informants, which was much criticised due to its accusations of heresy on limited evidence. This campaign was run by Monsignor Umberto Benigni in the Department of Extraordinary Affairs in the Secretariat of State, which distributed anti-Modernist propaganda and gathered information on "culprits". In Benigni's secret code, Pius X was known as Mama. Among those it investigated was the teacher of church history, Angelo Roncalli (later Pope John XXIII), but the Holy Office cleared him of all charges.

His reputation for anti-Modernism led to the use of his name in the 1970s by Bishop Marcel Lefebvre in establishing the Society of Saint Pius X, for Catholics disaffected in the wake of liturgical reforms.

=== Catechism of Saint Pius X ===
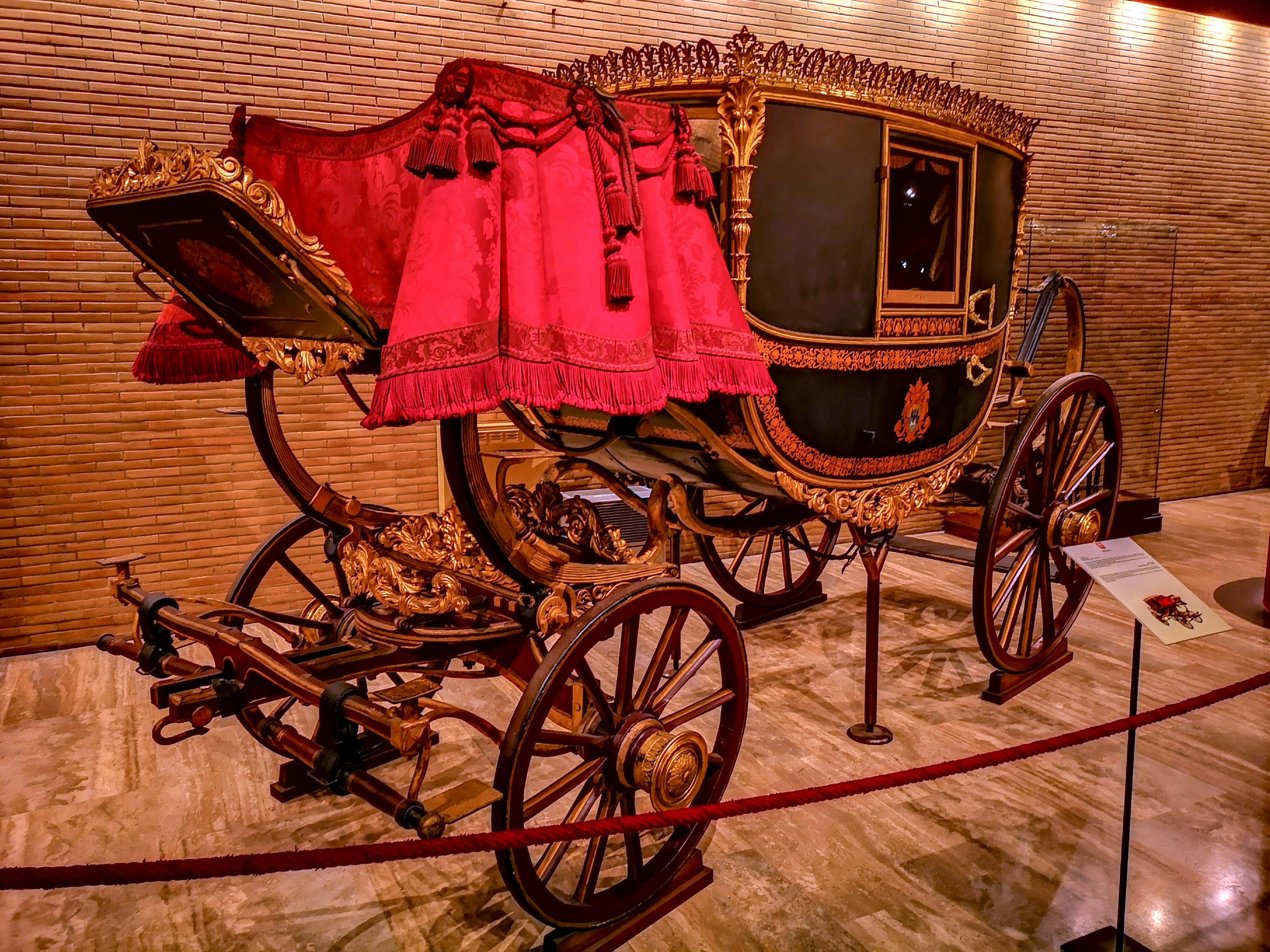
Gala Berlin produced in Rome by the Casalini brothers, renowned carriage manufacturers, during the papacy of Pius IX, whose coat of arms is painted on both doors. As shown by the emblems of Pius IX and Pius X, painted on the right and left doors, respectively, the carriage was used during various pontificates until the beginning of the twentieth century.

In his 1905 letter Acerbo nimis, Pius X mandated the establishment of the Confraternity of Christian Doctrine (catechism class) in every parish in the world, and he extolled catechetical training as a method of religious teaching.

The Catechism of Pius X is his realisation of a simple, plain, brief, popular catechism for uniform use throughout the whole world; it was used in the ecclesiastical province of Rome and for some years in other parts of Italy; it was not, however, prescribed for use throughout the universal Church. It was issued in 1908 in Italian as Catechismo della dottrina Cristiana, Pubblicato per Ordine del Sommo Pontifice San Pio X. An English translation (Catechism of Saint Pius X) runs to 115 pages.

Pope Benedict XVI praised its "simplicity of exposition and depth of content. Also because of this, Pius X's catechism might have friends in the future." Asked in 2003 whether the almost 100-year-old work was still valid, Cardinal Joseph Ratzinger said: "The faith as such is always the same. Hence the Catechism of Saint Pius X always preserves its value. Whereas ways of transmitting the contents of the faith can change instead. And hence one may wonder whether the Catechism of Saint Pius X can in that sense still be considered valid today."

The Society of Saint Pius X (SSPX), an excommunicated traditionalist fraternity, recommends the Catechism of Saint Pius X over the 1992 Catechism of the Catholic Church.

=== Reform of canon law ===
Canon law of the Catholic Church varied from region to region with no overall prescriptions. On 19 March 1904, Pope Pius X named a commission of cardinals to draft a universal set of laws. Two of his successors worked in the commission: Giacomo della Chiesa, who became Pope Benedict XV, and Eugenio Pacelli, who became Pope Pius XII. This first Code of Canon Law was promulgated by Benedict XV on 27 May 1917, with an effective date of 19 May 1918, and remained in effect until Advent 1983, when Pope John Paul II, promulgated the contemporary canon law.

=== Reform of Church administration ===
Pius X reformed the Roman Curia with the constitution Sapienti Consilio (29 June 1908) and specified new rules enforcing a bishop's oversight of seminaries in the encyclical Pieni l'animo. He established regional seminaries (closing some smaller ones), and promulgated a new plan of seminary study. He also barred clergy from administering social organizations.

=== Church policies towards secular governments ===
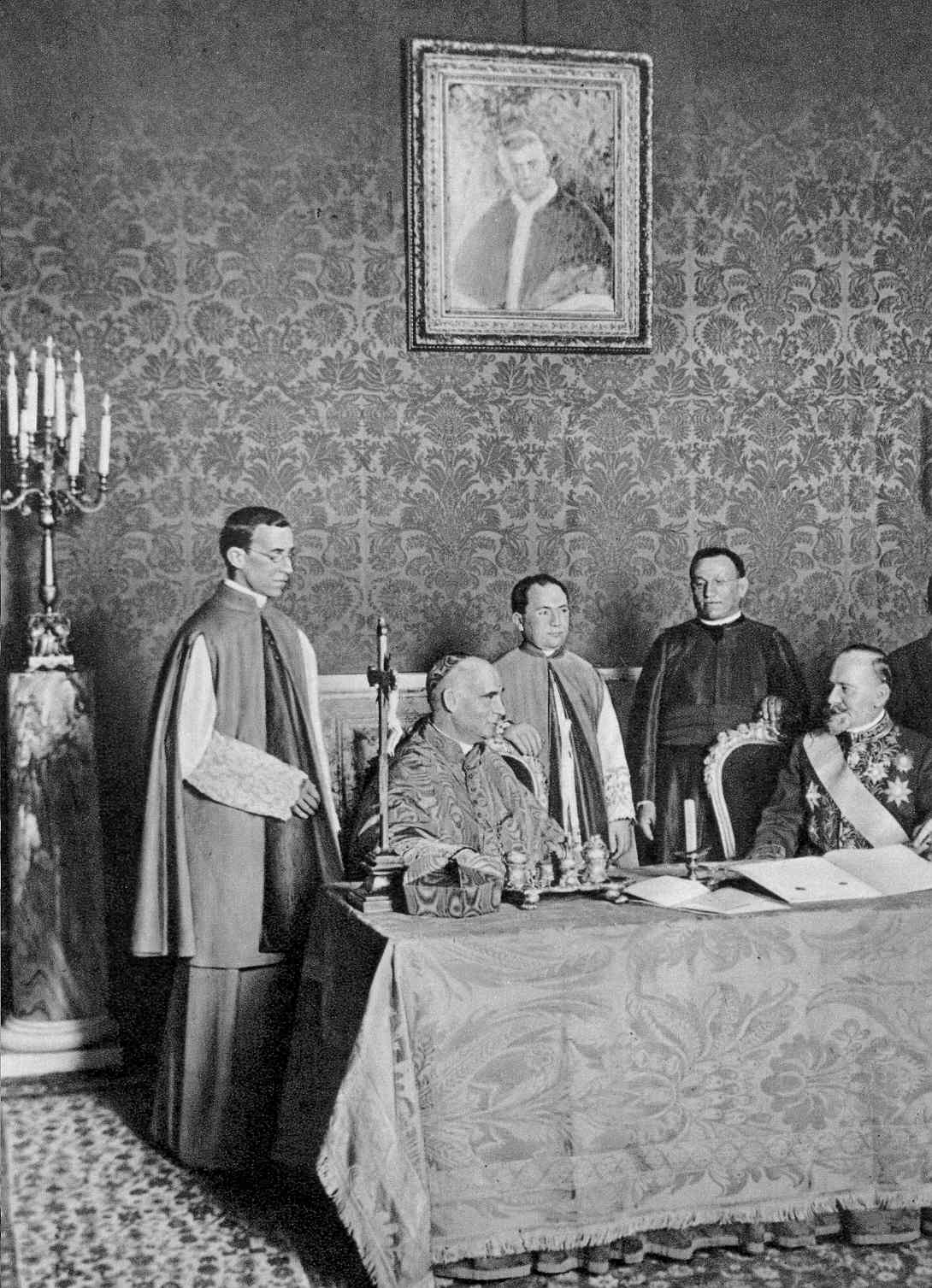
Monsignor Eugenio Pacelli at left and Cardinal Secretary Rafael Merry del Val with Serbian diplomat and special minister Milenko Vesnić at the signing ceremony of the Serbian concordat during the pontificate of Pius X, dated 24 June 1914

Pius X reversed the accommodating approach of Leo XIII towards secular governments, appointing Rafael Merry del Val as Cardinal Secretary of State (Merry del Val would later have his own cause opened for canonization in 1953, but still has not been beatified). When the French president Émile Loubet visited the Italian monarch Victor Emmanuel III (1900–1946), Pius X, still refusing to accept the annexation of the papal territories by Italy, reproached the French president for the visit and refused to meet him. This led to a diplomatic break with France and to the 1905 Law of Separation between church and state, by which the Church lost government funding in France. The Pope denounced this law in his encyclicals Vehementer Nos and Gravissimo officii munere, and removed two French bishops for recognising the Third Republic. However, support came to him from all over the world, notably from the missionary bishop Peter Joseph Hurth. On May 5, 1907, Hurth took part in a public gathering of Indian Catholics in Calcutta in support of the pope and the Catholics of France. Eventually, France expelled the Jesuits and broke off diplomatic relations with the Vatican.

The Pope adopted a similar position toward secular governments in Portugal, Ireland, Poland, Ethiopia, and in other states with large Catholic populations. His opposition to international relations with Italy angered the secular powers of these countries, as well as a few others like the United Kingdom and Russia. In Ireland, Protestants increasingly worried that a proposed Home Rule by an Irish parliament representing the Catholic majority (rather than the status quo of rule by Westminster since the 1800 Union of Ireland and Great Britain) would result in Rome Rule due to Pius X's uncompromising stance being followed by Irish Catholics (Ultramontanism).

In 1908, the papal decree Ne Temere came into effect which complicated mixed marriages. Marriages not performed by a Catholic priest were declared legal but sacramentally invalid, worrying some Protestants that the Church would counsel separation for couples married in a Protestant church or by civil service. Priests were given discretion to refuse mixed marriages or to lay conditions upon them, commonly including a requirement that the children be raised Catholic. The decree proved particularly divisive in Ireland, with its large Protestant minority, contributing indirectly to the subsequent political conflict there and provoking debates in the British House of Commons. The long-term effect of Ne Temere in Ireland was that Irish Unionism which had had strongholds in Dublin as well as Ulster, but existed to some extent on the entire island of Ireland, declined overall and became virtually exclusively a phenomenon of what is today Northern Ireland. Furthermore, while historically both Protestant Irish nationalists and Catholic Unionists existed, the split over who should rule Northern Ireland eventually came to almost exactly match the confessional divide.

As secular authority challenged the papacy, Pius X became more aggressive. He suspended the Opera dei Congressi, which coordinated the work of Catholic associations in Italy, as well as condemning Le Sillon, a French social movement that tried to reconcile the Church with liberal political views. He also opposed trade unions that were not exclusively Catholic.

Pius X partially lifted decrees prohibiting Italian Catholics from voting, but he never recognised the Italian government.

=== Rejection of Zionism ===
On 26 January 1904, Pius X received Theodor Herzl, the father of modern political Zionism, in an audience; Herzl had hoped to convince the Vatican to support his movement. Pius X was respectful towards Herzl, but would not support the establishment of a modern State of Israel, citing the refusal of the Jewish people to acknowledge Jesus as the biblical Messiah.

=== Relations with the Kingdom of Italy ===
Initially, Pius maintained his prisoner in the Vatican stance, but with the rise of socialism he began to allow the Non Expedit, which prohibited Catholics from voting, to be relaxed. In 1905, he authorized bishops in his encyclical Il fermo proposito to offer a dispensation allowing their parishioners to exercise their legislative rights when "the supreme good of society" was at stake.

=== Relations with Poland and Russia ===
Under Pius X, the traditionally difficult situation of Polish Catholics in Russia did not improve. Although Nicholas II of Russia issued a decree on 22 February 1903, promising religious freedom for the Catholic Church, and in 1905 promulgated a constitution which included religious freedom, the Russian Orthodox Church felt threatened and insisted on stiff interpretations. Papal decrees were not permitted and contacts with the Vatican remained outlawed.

=== Activities for the United States ===
In 1903, Pius X negotiated a deal with the United States Government, allowing it to purchase all land owned by Catholic friars in the recently acquired territory of the Philippines for a total of $7 million ($201 million in 2025). The agreement was made between Pius X and Philippine Governor-General William Howard Taft after previous negotiations between Taft and Pope Leo XIII had failed.

In 1908, Pius X lifted the United States out of its missionary status, in recognition of the growth of the Church in America. Fifteen new dioceses were created in the US during his pontificate, and he named two American cardinals. He was very popular among American Catholics, often depicted as an ordinary man from a poor family, raised by God to the papal throne.

In 1910, the Pope refused an audience with former Vice President Charles W. Fairbanks, who had addressed the Methodist association in Rome, as well as with former President Theodore Roosevelt, who intended to address the same association.

On 8 July 1914, Pope Pius X approved the request of Cardinal James Gibbons to invoke the patronage of the Immaculate Conception for the construction site of the National Shrine of the Immaculate Conception in Washington, D.C.

=== Other international affairs ===
Pius X attempted to establish bilateral relations with China. France, which had asserted its religious protectorate in China following the unequal treaties, contended that the Holy See had no sovereign territory and no right to act independently in international matters and blocked the effort by Pius X.

== Miracles during the Pope's lifetime ==
Other than the stories of miracles performed through the Pope's intercession after his death, there are also stories of miracles performed by the Pope during his lifetime. On one occasion, during a papal audience, Pius X was holding a paralyzed child who wriggled free from his arms and then ran around the room. On another occasion, a couple (who had made confession to him while he was bishop of Mantua) with a two-year-old child with meningitis wrote to the Pope and Pius X then wrote back to them to hope and pray. Two days later, the child was cured.

Cardinal Ernesto Ruffini (later the Archbishop of Palermo) had visited the Pope after Ruffini was diagnosed with tuberculosis, and the Pope had told him to go back to the seminary and that he would be fine. Ruffini gave this story to the investigators of the pontiff's cause for canonization.

Once, a man who suffered from a paralyzed arm begged Pius X for his help. Taking his arm in his hand, the Pope simply said, "have confidence in the Lord ... only have faith and the Lord will heal you". At that moment, the man could actually move his arm, calling out to the Pope joyfully who simply put a finger to his lips so as not to draw any attention to what had happened, indicating that the man simply hold his peace. Another case saw an Irish girl covered in sores taken to see the Pope by her mother. When Pius X saw her, he placed his hand on her head, and the sores completely disappeared. Another case saw a Roman schoolgirl contract a serious foot disease that rendered her crippled since she was only a year old. Through a friend she managed to acquire one of the Pope's socks and was told that she would be healed if she wore it, which she did. At the moment she placed the sock on, the diseased foot was instantly healed. When Pius X heard about this, he laughed and said, "What a joke! I wear my own socks every day and still I suffer from constant pain in my feet!"

== Other activities ==
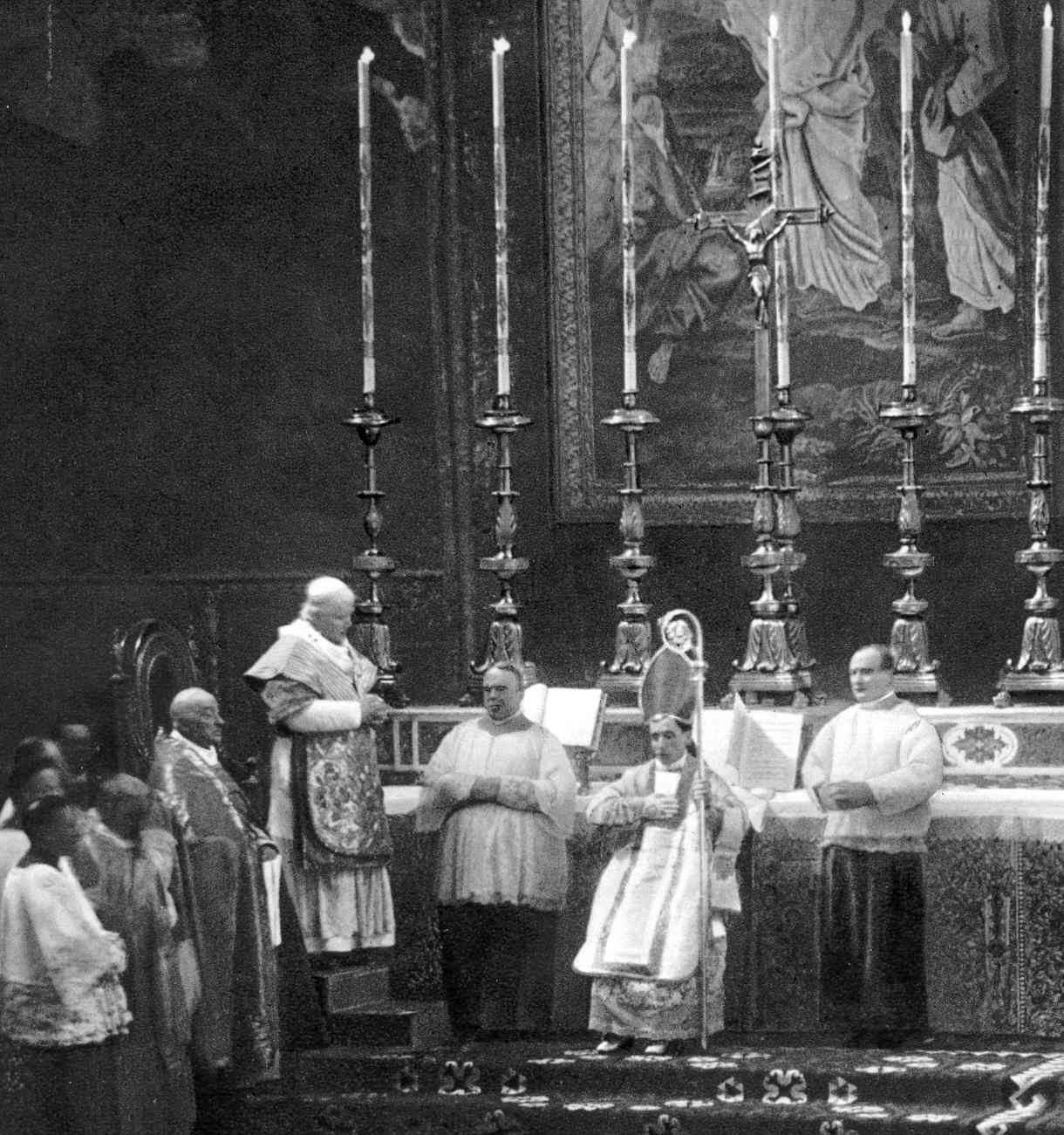
Pius X consecrates Bishop Giacomo Paolo Giovanni Battista della Chiesa, the future Pope Benedict XV, in the Vatican in 1907.

In addition to the political defense of the Church, liturgical reforms, anti-modernism, and the beginning of the codification of canon law, the papacy of Pius X saw the reorganisation of the Roman Curia. He also sought to update the education of priests, seminaries and their curricula were reformed. In 1904 Pope Pius X granted permission for diocesan seminarians to attend the College of St. Thomas. He raised the college to the status of Pontificium on 2 May 1906, thus making its degrees equivalent to those of the world's other pontifical universities. By Apostolic Letter of 8 November 1908, signed by the Supreme Pontiff on 17 November, the college was transformed into the Collegium Pontificium Internationale Angelicum. It would become the Pontifical University of Saint Thomas Aquinas, Angelicum in 1963.

Pius X published 16 encyclicals; among them was Vehementer nos on 11 February 1906, which condemned the 1905 French law on the separation of the State and the Church. Pius X also confirmed, though not infallibly, the existence of Limbo in Catholic theology in his 1905 Catechism, saying that the unbaptized "do not have the joy of God but neither do they suffer... they do not deserve Paradise, but neither do they deserve Hell or Purgatory." On 23 November 1903, Pius X issued a papal directive, a motu proprio, that banned women from singing in church choirs (i.e. the architectural choir).

Pius established the first World Migrant Day in 1914, now the World Day of Migrants and Refugees.

In the Prophecy of St. Malachy, the collection of 112 prophecies about the popes, Pius X appears as Ignis Ardens or "Ardent Fire".

== Canonizations and beatifications ==
Pius X beatified a total of 131 individuals (including groups of martyrs and those by recognition of "cultus") and canonized four. Those beatified during his pontificate included Marie-Geneviève Meunier (1906), Rose-Chrétien de la Neuville (1906), Valentin de Berriochoa (1906), Clair of Nantes (1907), Zdislava Berka (1907), John of Ruysbroeck (1908), Andrew Nam Thung (1909), Agatha Lin (1909), Agnes De (1909), Joan of Arc (1909), and John Eudes (1909). Those canonized by him were Alexander Sauli (1904), Gerard Majella (1904), Clement Mary Hofbauer (1909), and Joseph Oriol (1909).

In 1908 Pope Pius X named John Chrysostom a patron saint of preachers.

== Consistories ==
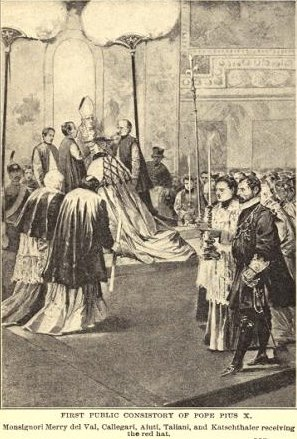
Pope Pius X presiding at his first public consistory on 12 November 1903

Pius X created 50 cardinals in seven consistories held during his pontificate which included noted figures of the Church during that time such as Désiré-Joseph Mercier (1907) and Pietro Gasparri (1907). In 1911, he increased American representation in the cardinalate based on the fact that the United States was expanding; the Pope also named one cardinal in pectore (António Mendes Belo, whom the media accurately speculated on) in 1911 whose name he later revealed in 1914. Pius X also named as a cardinal Giacomo della Chiesa, his immediate successor, Pope Benedict XV.

Among the cardinals whom he nominated came the first Brazilian-born (and the first Latin American-born; Joaquim Arcoverde de Albuquerque Cavalcanti) and the first from the Netherlands (Willem Marinus van Rossum) since 1523. The consistory of 1911 was the largest number of cardinals elevated at a single consistory in roughly a century.

In 1911, the Pope reportedly wished to elevate Diomede Panici to the cardinalate; however, Panici died before the promotion ever took place. Furthermore, this came after Panici was originally considered but passed for the elevation by Pope Leo XIII who even had considered elevating Panici's brother. In the 1914 consistory, Pius X considered naming the Capuchin friar Armando Pietro Sabadel to the cardinalate; however, Sabadel declined the Pope's invitation.

== Death and burial ==
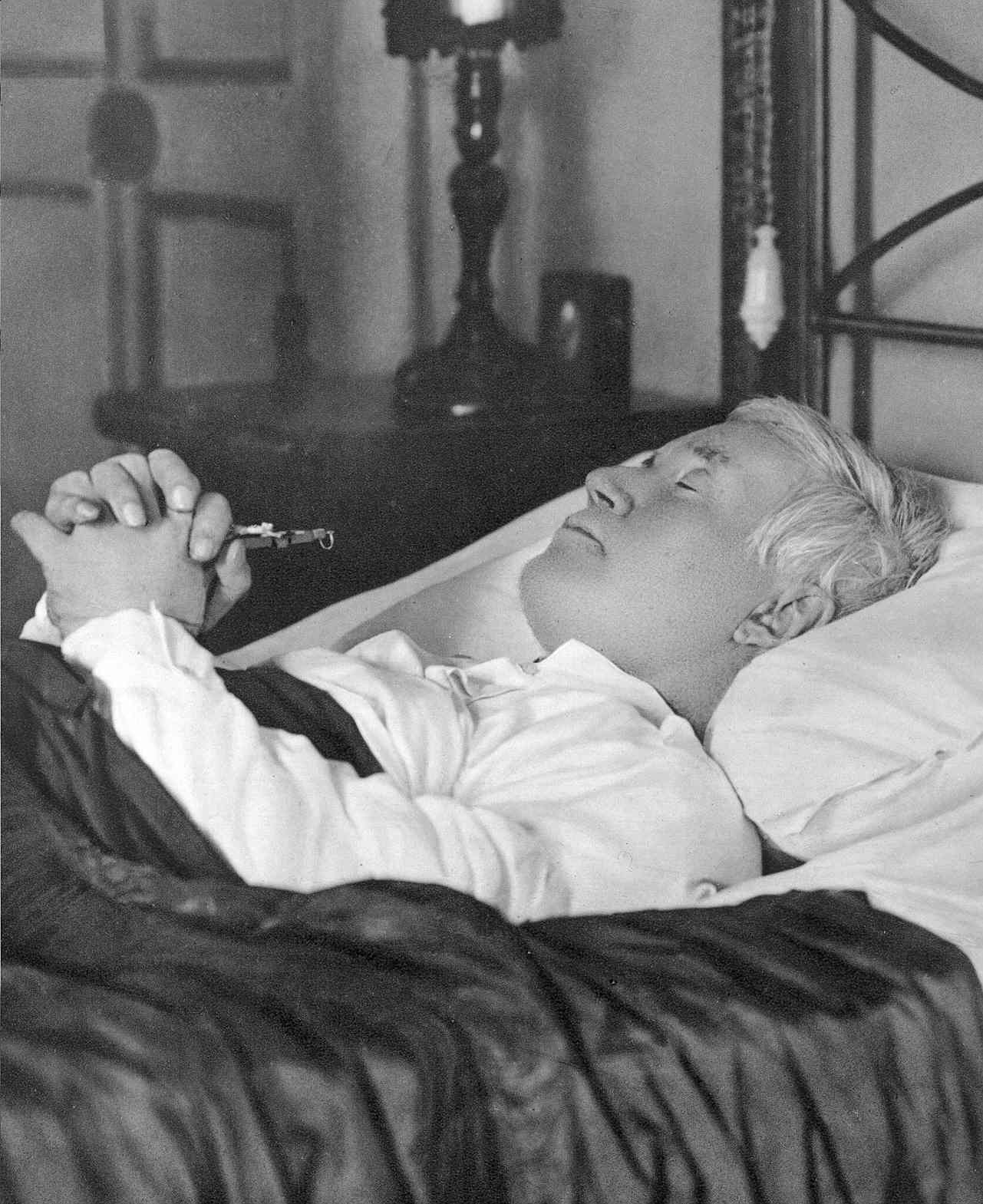
Pius X on his deathbed

In 1913, Pope Pius X suffered a heart attack, and subsequently lived in the shadow of poor health. In 1914, the Pope fell ill on the Feast of the Assumption of Mary (15 August 1914); it was an illness from which he would not recover, and it was reported that he suffered from a fever and lung complications. His condition was worsened by the events leading to the outbreak of World War I (1914–1918), which reportedly sent the 79-year-old into a state of melancholy.

While the Pope's condition was classified as serious, alarming symptoms did not develop until 19 August. While Pius X spent most of that day in and out of consciousness, he said at one stage, "In ancient times, the Pope by a word might have stayed the slaughter, but now he is impotent". The Pope shortly after received the Last Rites and eventually, an old bronchial infection that the Pope had previously had in years past returned, further hastening his decline. The disease which he had been suffering extended to the bronchial tree resulting in pneumonia that killed him.

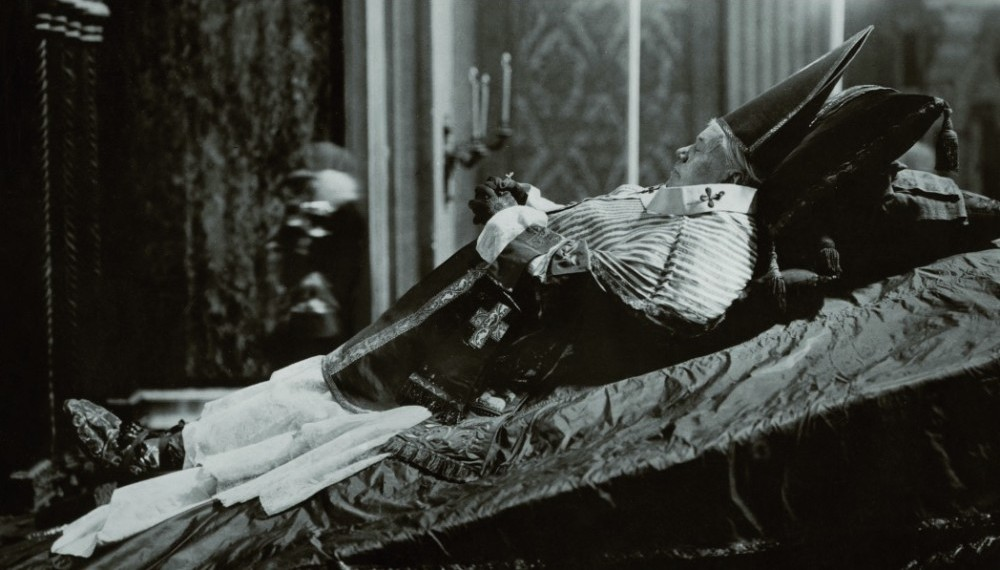
Pius X during his lying in state, 21–22 August 1914

Pope Pius X died at 1:20am on Thursday, 20 August 1914, only a few hours after the death of Jesuit leader Franz Xavier Wernz, and on the very day when German forces marched into Brussels. In a moment of lucidity just moments before he died, Pius X is reported to have said: "Now I begin to think the end is approaching. The Almighty in His inexhaustible goodness wishes to spare me the horrors which Europe is undergoing". His sister, Anna, was praying at his bedside when Pius X died. The Pope's last act of life was to kiss the little crucifix that he had clasped in his hands at around 1:15am.

Pius X was buried in a simple and unadorned tomb in the crypt below Saint Peter's Basilica. His body was laid in state on 21 August in red pontifical vestments and then interred following the Requiem Mass following his coffin lying in state on a large catafalque in the Sistine Chapel. His original tombstone bore the inscription: "Pope Pius X, poor and yet rich, gentle and humble of heart, unconquerable champion of the Catholic Faith, whose constant endeavor it was to renew all things in Christ". Papal physicians had been in the habit of removing organs to aid the embalming process. Pius X expressly prohibited this in his burial and successive popes have continued this tradition. Pius X's tomb is located near the tombs of both Pope John XXIII and Pope John Paul II under the altar of the Presentation.

After Pope Pius X's death, the 1914 conclave was held from 31 August to 3 September. It elected Giacomo della Chiesa, who was known as Pope Benedict XV.

== Exhumation ==
On 19 May 1944, the body of Pius X was exhumed for inspection as part of the beatification process, during which the remains were found to be miraculously incorrupt. In 1959, the remains of the late pope were sent, with the permission of Pope John XXIII (himself a former Patriarch of Venice), to Venice. Before the remains were taken to Venice via a train on 11 April, Pope John XXIII led a small prayer service alongside some other cardinals. The body was exposed for the veneration of the faithful at St Mark's Basilica for one month (12 April–10 May) before it was returned to the late pope's original resting place, with Cardinal Giovanni Urbani acting as the papal legate for the month-long event.

== Canonization ==
Pope Saint Pius X Bishop of Rome
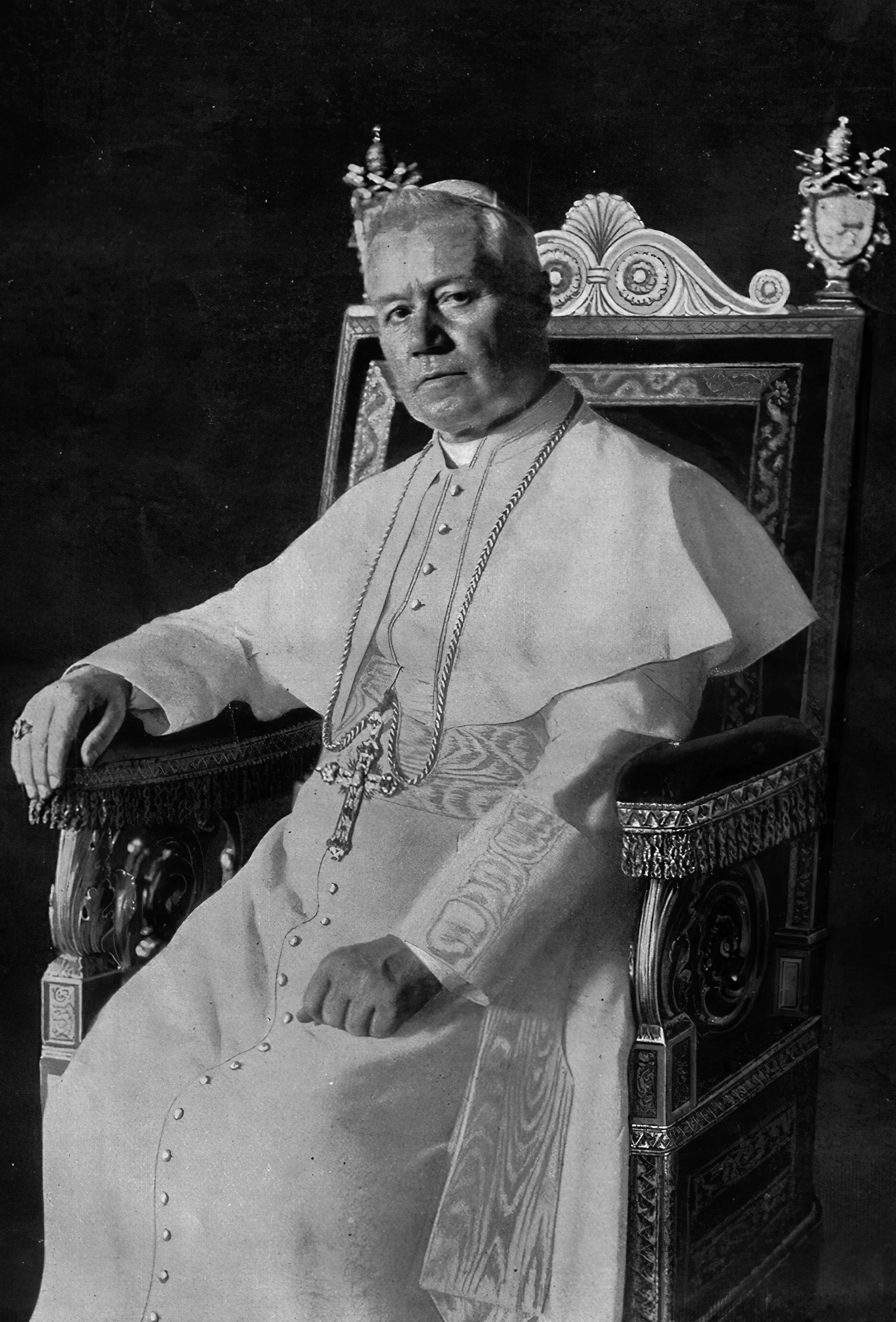
- Official portrait, 1903

Pope, Confessor of the Faith
- Venerated in: Catholic Church
- Beatified: 3 June 1951, Saint Peter's Basilica, Vatican City by Pope Pius XII
- Canonized: 29 May 1954, Saint Peter's Basilica, Vatican City by Pope Pius XII
- Feast: 21 August; 3 September (General Roman Calendar 1955–1969)
- Patronage: Archdiocese of Atlanta, Georgia; diocese of Des Moines, Iowa; first communicants; Diocese of Great Falls-Billings, Montana; archdiocese of Kottayam, India; pilgrims; Santa Luċija, Malta; Diocese of Springfield-Cape Girardeau, Missouri; Archdiocese of Zamboanga, Philippines; emigrants from Treviso; Patriarchate of Venice; St. Pius X Seminary (Dubuque, Iowa)

Although Pius X's canonization took place in 1954, the events leading up to it began immediately with his death. A letter of 24 September 1916 by Monsignor Leo, Bishop of Nicotera and Tropea, referred to Pius X as "a great Saint and a great Pope." To accommodate the large number of pilgrims seeking access to his tomb, more than the crypt would hold, "a small metal cross was set into the floor of the basilica," which read Pius Papa X, "so that the faithful might kneel down directly above the tomb". Masses were held near his tomb until 1930.

Devotion to Pius X between the two world wars remained high. On 14 February 1923, in honor of the 20th anniversary of his accession to the papacy, the first moves toward his canonization began with the formal appointment of those who would carry out his cause. The event was marked by the erecting of a monument in his memory in St. Peter's Basilica. On 19 August 1939, Pope Pius XII (1939–58) delivered a tribute to Pius X at Castel Gandolfo. On 12 February 1943, a further development of Pius X's cause was achieved, when he was declared to have displayed heroic virtues, gaining therefore the title "Venerable".

On 19 May 1944, Pius X's coffin was exhumed and was taken to the Chapel of the Holy Crucifix in St. Peter's Basilica for the canonical examination. Upon opening the coffin, the examiners found the body of Pius X remarkably well preserved, despite the fact that he had died 30 years before and had made wishes not to be embalmed. According to Jerome Dai-Gal, "all of the body" of Pius X "was in an excellent state of conservation". At the canonical recognition of his mortal body were present the Italian cardinals Alfredo Ottaviani and Nicola Canali.

After the examination and the end of the apostolic process towards Pius X's cause, Pius XII bestowed the title of Venerable Servant of God upon Pius X. His body was exposed for 45 days (Rome was liberated by the Allies during this time), before being placed back in his tomb.

Following this, the process towards beatification began, and investigations by the Sacred Congregation of Rites (SCR) into miracles performed by intercessory work of Pius X took place. The SCR would eventually recognize two miracles. The first involved Marie-Françoise Deperras, a nun who had bone cancer and was cured on 7 December 1928 during a novena in which a relic of Pius X was placed on her chest. The second involved the nun Benedetta De Maria, who had cancer, and in a novena started in 1938, she eventually touched a relic statue of Pius X and was cured.

Pope Pius XII officially approved the two miracles on 11 February 1951; and on 4 March, Pius XII, in his De Tuto, declared that the Church could continue in the beatification of Pius X. His beatification took place on 3 June 1951 at St. Peter's before 23 cardinals, hundreds of bishops and archbishops, and a crowd of 100,000 faithful. During his beatification decree, Pius XII referred to Pius X as "Pope of the Eucharist", in honor of Pius X's expansion of the rite to children.

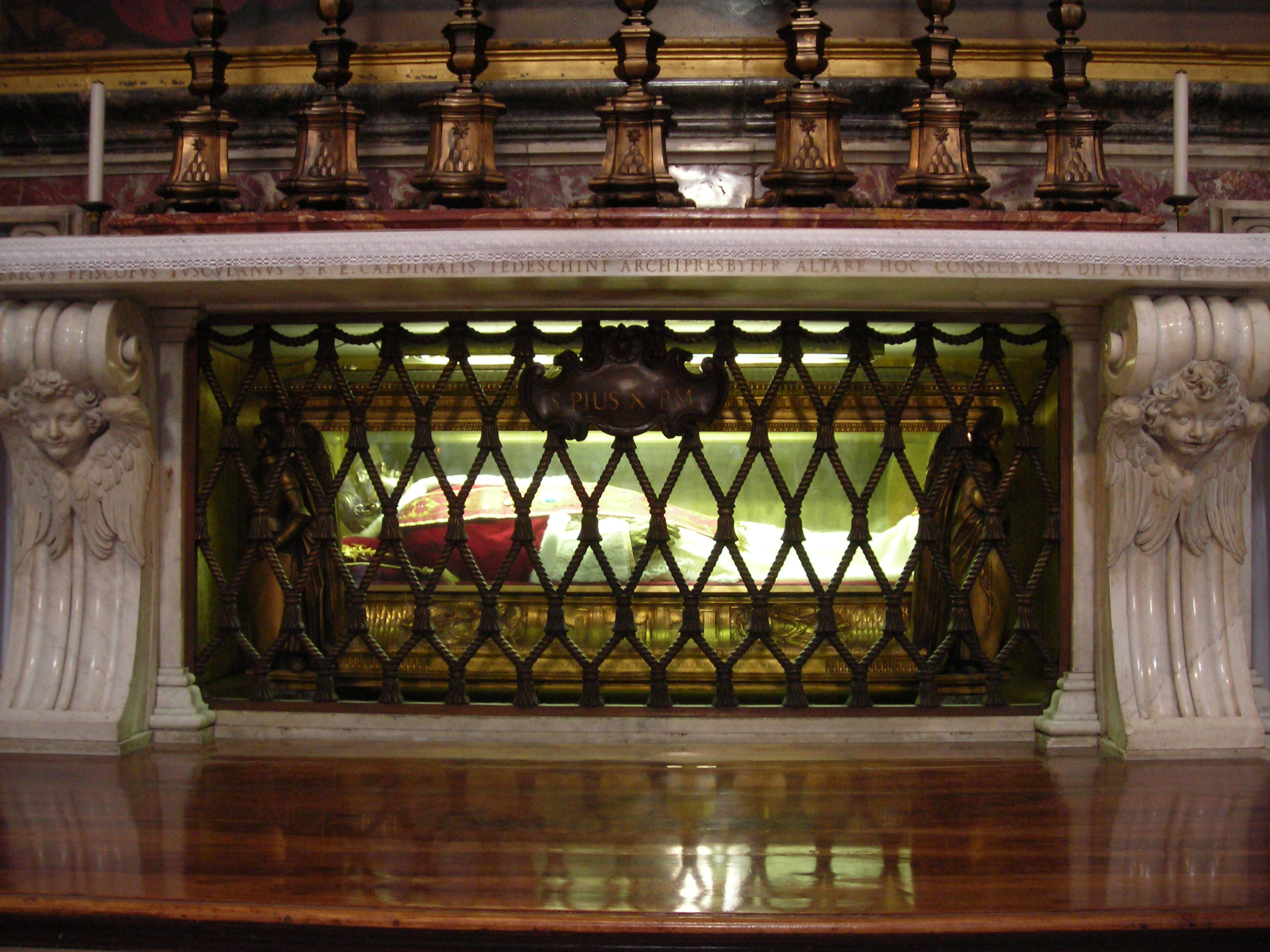
The tomb of Pope Pius X under the altar of the Chapel of the Presentation in St. Peter's Basilica

The cause for Pius X's canonization was opened on 24 November 1951. On 17 February 1952, Pius X's body was transferred from its tomb to the Vatican basilica and placed under the altar of the Chapel of the Presentation in St. Peter's Basilica. The pontiff's body lies within a glass and bronze-work sarcophagus for the faithful to see.

On 29 May 1954, less than three years after his beatification, Pius X was canonized, following the SCR's recognition of two more miracles. The first involved Francesco Belsami, an attorney from Naples who had a pulmonary abscess, who was cured upon placing a picture of Pope Pius X upon his chest. The second miracle involved Sr. Maria Ludovica Scorcia, a nun who was afflicted with a serious neurotropic virus, and who, upon several novenas, was entirely cured. The canonization Mass was presided over by Pius XII at Saint Peter's Basilica before a crowd of about 800,000 of the faithful and Church officials at St. Peter's Basilica. Pius X became the first pope to be canonized since Pius V in 1712.

Pope Pius X's canonization ceremony was taped and recorded by television news broadcasters, including NBC.

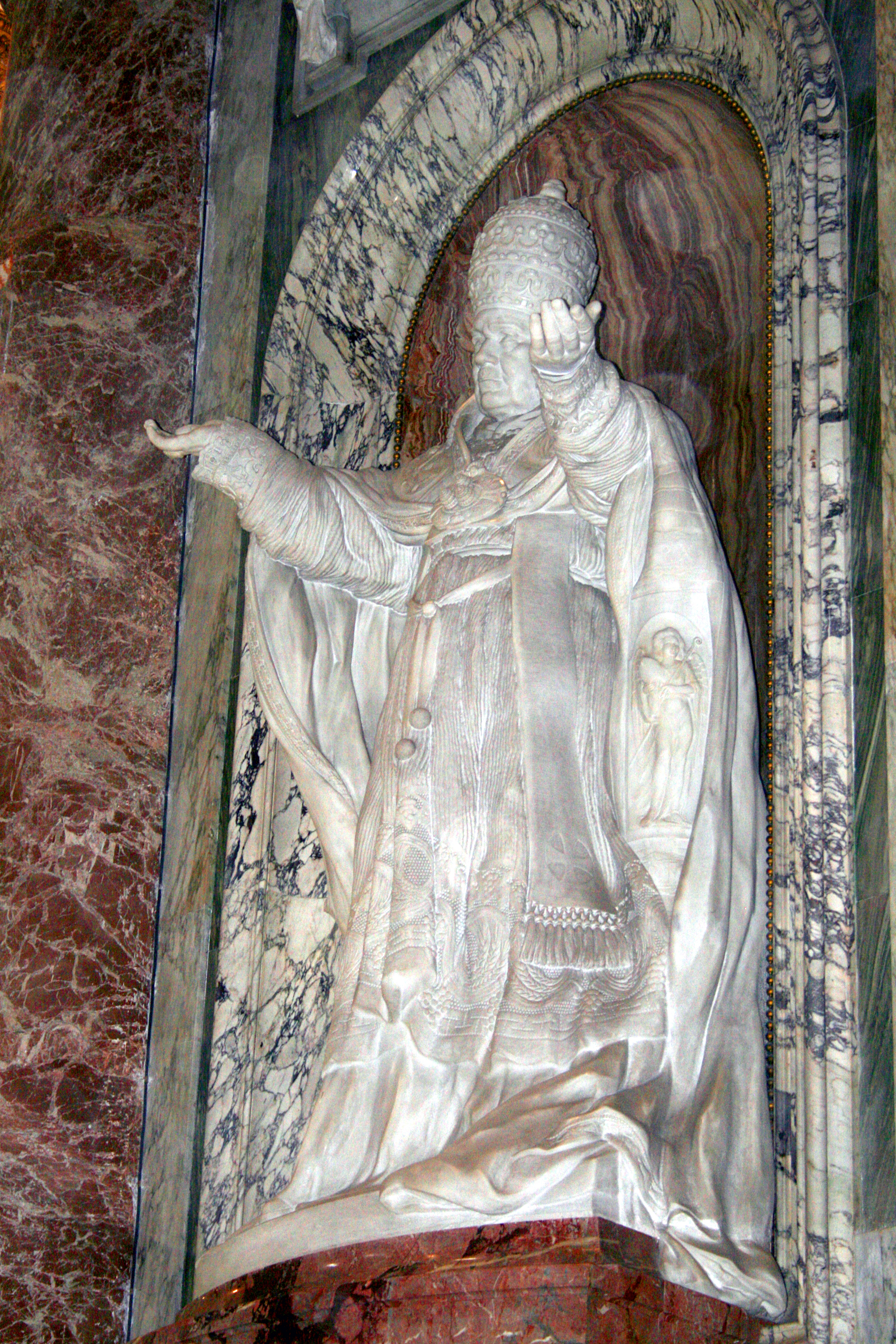
The statue of Pius X in St. Peter's Basilica

Prayer cards often depict the sanctified pontiff with instruments of Holy Communion. In addition to being celebrated as the "Pope of the Blessed Sacrament", Pius X is also the patron saint of emigrants from Treviso. He is honored in numerous parishes in Italy, Germany, Belgium, Canada, and the United States.

The number of parishes, schools, seminaries and retreat houses named after him in Western countries is very large, partly because he was very well known, and his beatification and canonization in the early 1950s was during a period of time following World War II when there was a great deal of new construction in cities and population growth in the era of the baby boom, thus leading to Catholic institutional expansion that correlated with the growing society.

Pius X's feast day was assigned in 1955 to 3 September, to be celebrated as a Double. It remained thus for 15 years. In the 1960 calendar, the rank was changed to Third-Class Feast. The rank in the General Roman Calendar since 1969 is that of Memorial and the feast day is obligatorily celebrated on 21 August, closer to the day of his death (20 August, impeded by the feast day of St Bernard).

The Confraternity of Christian Doctrine was a big supporter of his canonization, partly because he had ordained the need for its existence in every diocese and because it had received a great deal of episcopal criticism, and it was thought that by canonizing the Pope who gave them their mandate, this would help inoculate against this criticism. They initiated a prayer crusade for his canonization that achieved the participation of over two million names.

After the Pope's canonization, another miracle is said to have taken place when a Christian family activist named Clem Lane suffered a major heart attack and was placed in an oxygen tent, where he was given extreme unction. A relic of the Pope was placed over his tent, and he recovered to the great surprise of his doctors. A sister of Loretto at Webster College in St Louis, Missouri, claimed that her priest brother had been cured through the Pope's intercession as well.

== Papal coat of arms ==
Coat of arms of Pius X

The personal papal arms of Pius X are composed of the traditional elements of all papal heraldry before Pope Benedict XVI: the shield, the papal tiara, and the keys, symbolizing papal authority.

The shield is charged in two parts, as it is per fess. In upper shield (chief) shows the arms of the Patriarch of Venice, which was Pius X's see from 1893 to 1903. It consists of the Lion of Saint Mark proper and haloed in silver upon a silver-white background, displaying a book with the inscription of PAX TIBI MARCE on the left page and EVANGELISTA MEUS on the right page. This means "Peace to you, Mark, my evangelist", the motto of Venice as the final resting place of Mark the Evangelist; however, the arms of the Republic of Venice have red background. Previous Patriarchs of Venice had combined their personal arms with these arms of the Patriarchate. The same chief can be seen in the arms of the later popes who were Patriarchs of Venice upon election to the See of Rome, John XXIII and John Paul I. Renditions of this part of Pius X's arms depict the lion either with or without a sword, and sometimes only one side of the book is written on.

The lower shield displays the arms of Pius X as Bishop of Mantua: an anchor proper cast into a stormy sea (the blue and silver wavy lines), lit up by a single six-pointed star of gold. These were inspired by Hebrews Chapter 6, Versicle 19, (English: "The hope we have is the sure and steadfast anchor of the soul") Bishop Sarto had said, "hope is the sole companion of my life, the greatest support in uncertainty, the strongest power in situations of weakness."

Although not present upon his arms, the most famous motto of Pius X was: Instaurare omnia in Christo (English: "To restore all things in Christ"), allegedly his last words before his death.

== Cultural depictions ==
The life of Pope Pius X is depicted in the 1951 movie Gli uomini non-guardano il cielo by Umberto Scarpelli. The movie is centered on the year 1914, as the Pope grieves over the threat that is incumbent and is consoled by his nephew.

A satirical depiction of Pope Pius X is presented in Flann O'Brien's novel The Hard Life, as the Irish characters travel from Dublin to Rome and gain a personal interview with the Pope, which ends very badly.

In the poem "Zone" by Guillaume Apollinaire, Pope Pius X is referred to as L'Européen le plus moderne, the most modern European.

== See also ==
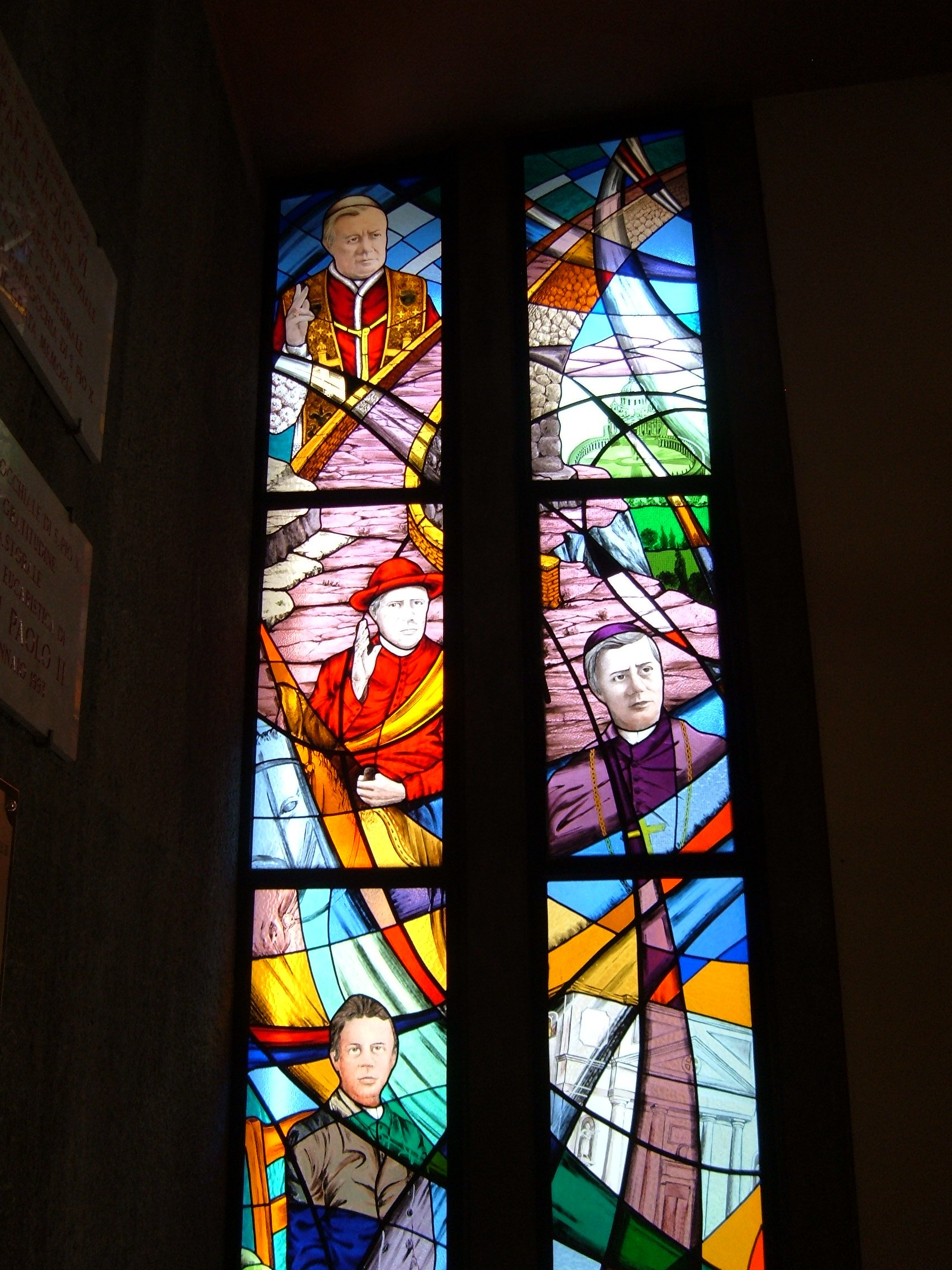
Life of Pope Pius X, depicted on a window in San Pio X alla Balduina

- List of Catholic saints
- List of encyclicals of Pope Pius X
- List of popes
- Mario Sarto, his grandnephew
- Reform of the Roman Breviary by Pope Pius X
- St. Pius X Seminary, Philippines
- Pope Pius X, patron saint archive
- Saint Pius X Catholic High School, a high school in Kansas City, Missouri
- Pius X High School, Nebraska, United States
- St. Pius X High School, Albuquerque, New Mexico, United States
- Pius X High School, a high school in Bangor, Pennsylvania, United States that operated from 1951 to 2015
- St. Pius X High School, Ottawa, Ontario, Canada
- St. Pius X Church, St. John's, Newfoundland and Labrador, Canada
- San Pio X alla Balduina, titular church in Rome

== Bibliography ==
- Bavoux, GA (1996). Le porteur de lumière [The bearer of light] (in French). Paris: Pygmalion.
- Browne-Olf, Lillian. Their Name Is Pius (1941) pp 235–304 online
- Chadwick, Owen (2003). A History of the Popes 1830-1914. pp. 332–405. Archived from the original on 24 May 2018 – via Questia.
- Chiron, Yves (2002). Pope Saint Pius X: Restorer of The Church. Kansas City, MO: Angelus. ISBN 978-1-892331-10-6.
- Cornwell, John (2008). Hitler's Pope: The Secret History of Pius XII. Penguin. ISBN 978-0-14311400-0.
- F. A. Forbes (1954) [Burns Oates & Washbourne 1918]. Pope St. Pius X. London: TAN.
- Kühner, Hans (1960). Lexikon der Päpste [Dictionary of Popes] (in German). Frankfurt: Fischer.
- Lortz, Joseph (1934). Geschichte der Kirche (in German). Munster.
- Noel, Gerard (13 December 2009). Pius XII: The Hound of Hitler (Hardcover). Bloomsbury. ISBN 978-1-84706355-7.
- Renz, Christopher J (2009). In This Light Which Gives Light: A History of the College of St. Albert the Great (1930–1980). Dominican School. ISBN 978-1-88373418-3.
- Regoli, Roberto (2009). "L'elite cardinalizia dopo la fine dello stato pontificio". Archivum Historiae Pontificiae (in Italian). 47: 63–87. JSTOR 23565185.
- Regoli, Roberto, ed. (2016). San Pio X. Papa riformatore di fronte alle sfide del nuovo secolo. Vatican City: Libreria Editrice Vaticana. ISBN 9788820997823.
- Smit, JO; dal Gal, G (1951). Beato Pio X. Amsterdam: N.V. Drukkerij De Tijd.
- van der Veldt, J. H. (1965). St. Pius X Pope. Boston, MA: Daughters of St. Paul.
- Cardinal Rafael Merry del Val (1920). Pope Pius X. Rome: Vatican.
- Catechismo della dottrina Cristiana, Pubblicato per Ordine del Sommo Pontifice San Pio X [Catecism of the Christian doctrine, published by order of the High priest Saint Pius X] (in Italian). Il Sabato. 1999.

=== In his lifetime ===
- Á Czaich; A. Fráter (1907). X. Pius pápa. Életének és uralkodásának története napjainkig. Budapest: Az Athenaeum.
- Monsignor Hartwell de la Garde Grissell (1903). Sede Vacante: Being a Diary Written During the Conclave of 1903. Oxford: James Parke & Co.
- Sarto, Giuseppe Melchiorre (2 February 1904). "Ad diem illum". Rome, IT: Vatican Publishing House. 5.
- ——— (1905). Catechism (PDF). Catholic Primer. Archived from the original (PDF) on 26 May 2013.
- ——— (15 April 1905a). "Acerbo Nimis". Rome, IT: Vatican Publishing House.
- ——— (3 July 1907). "Lamentabili Sane". Papal encyclicals.
- Schmidlin, Edward; de Waal, Anton (1904). Life of His Holiness, Pope Pius X. Benziger Brothers. (this was an apologetic work intended for American audiences, where criticism of 'popery' was very common in society, and it contained a preface by James Cardinal Gibbons).
- Monsignor E. Canon Schmitz (1907). Life of Pius X. New York: The American Catholic Publication Society.
- Monsignor Anton de Waal (1904). Life of Pope Pius X. trans. Joseph William Berg. Milwaukee: The M.H. Wiltzius Co.

=== Posthumous ===
- F. A. Forbes (1924) [1918]. Life of Pius X (2nd ed.). New York: PJ Kenedy & Sons. Merry del Val (above) considered this work to be the most authoritative written on him.
- René Bazin (1928). Pius X. St Louis: B Herder.
- Burton, Katherine (1950). The Great Mantle: The Life of Giuseppe Sarto. Longmens.
- Thornton, Father Francis Beauchesne (1952). The Burning Flame: The Life of Pius X. Benziger Brothers. This priest was the editor for Burton's book.
- Martini, Teri (1954). The Fisherman's Ring: The Life of Giuseppe Sarto, The Children's Pope. St Anthony Guild Press.

Catholic Church titles
Preceded by Giovanni Berengo	Bishop of Mantua; 10 November 1884 – 15 June 1893	Succeeded by Paolo Origo
Preceded by Domenico Agostini	Patriarch of Venice; 15 June 1893 – 4 August 1903	Succeeded by Aristide Cavallari
Preceded by Francesco Battaglini	Cardinal-Priest of San Bernardo alle Terme; 15 June 1893 – 4 August 1903	Succeeded by Emidio Taliani
Preceded by Leo XIII	Pope; 4 August 1903 – 20 August 1914	Succeeded by Benedict XV
