= Vehementer Nos =

1906 papal encyclical by Pope Pius X

Vehementer Nos Latin for 'We with vehemence' Encyclical of Pope Pius X
- Signature date: 11 February 1906
- Subject: French law on the Separation of Church and State
- Number: 6 of 17 of the pontificate
- Text: In Latin; In English

Vehementer Nos was a papal encyclical promulgated by Pope Pius X on 11 February 1906. He denounced the French law on the Separation of the Churches and the State enacted two months earlier. He condemned its unilateral abrogation of the Concordat of 1801 between Napoleon I and Pope Pius VII that had granted the Catholic Church a distinctive status and established a working relationship between the French government and the Holy See. The title of the document is taken from its opening words in Latin, which mean "We with vehemence".

== Background ==
Prior to the French Revolution of 1789, Roman Catholicism had been the state religion of France, and closely identified with the ancien regime. During the French Revolution, the National Assembly had taken Church properties and issued the Civil Constitution of the Clergy, which made the Church a department of the State, effectively removing it from papal authority. Subsequent laws abolished the traditional Gregorian calendar and Christian holidays. The revolution led to a brief separation of church and state in 1795, ended by Napoleon's re-establishment of the Catholic Church as the state religion with the Concordat of 1801.

While the Concordat restored some ties to the papacy, it was an attempt on Napoleon's part to win favor with Catholics in France and largely favored the state. According to its terms Catholicism was recognized as the religion of the great majority of the French but not the official state religion. While the Papacy had the right to depose bishops, the French government retained the right to nominate them. The state would pay clerical salaries to clergy who swore an oath of allegiance to the state. The Catholic Church also gave up all claims to Church lands confiscated after 1790, but Sunday was reestablished as a "festival", effective Easter Sunday, 18 April 1802.

== 1905 law ==
In 1905 the French government passed a law stipulating “the separation of churches and the state", and unilaterally abrogating the terms of the 1801 Concordat. According to Sheridan Gilley while claiming to guarantee freedom of worship, the law kept religion under state regulation. The act stipulated that all Church property be turned over to "associations" of lay people. The pope and most French Catholics considered the law as undermining the independent authority of the Church. Pius viewed it as related to Modernist theories popular in France, and a concerted attack upon the Church. In Italy, Modernism was more political than doctrinal.

In February 1906 the government began to make inventories of ecclesiastical property in order "to prevent any theft of antiques". This provoked riots in Paris, Lille, and some country districts by disgruntled French Catholics. People barricaded themselves in churches. According to Mary McAuliffe, people rang church bells to sound the alarm, and armed themselves with sticks and pitchforks. She notes that in the Pyrenees, the Basques brought their bears. Opposition to the reforms was supported by the monarchists.
