= E supremi =

1903 papal encyclical by Pius X

E supremi Latin for 'On high' Encyclical of Pope Pius X
- Signature date: 4 October 1903
- Subject: On the restoration of all things in Christ
- Number: 1 of 17 of the pontificate
- Text: In Latin; In English

E supremi is a papal encyclical (On High) issued by Pope Pius X on October 4, 1903. This was the first encyclical issued by the pontiff. He expressed his deep feelings of unworthiness by quoting the plight of Anselm of Canterbury. The pope saw the current age as wracked with troubles and even thought that we had perhaps reached the end of days. He fervently wished to administer to the spiritual needs of the day - emphasizing the Catholic position on marriage, education, respect for property, maintaining order and justice in the social classes. He emphasized the great importance of educating priests and of maintaining the highest level of morals in seminarians.

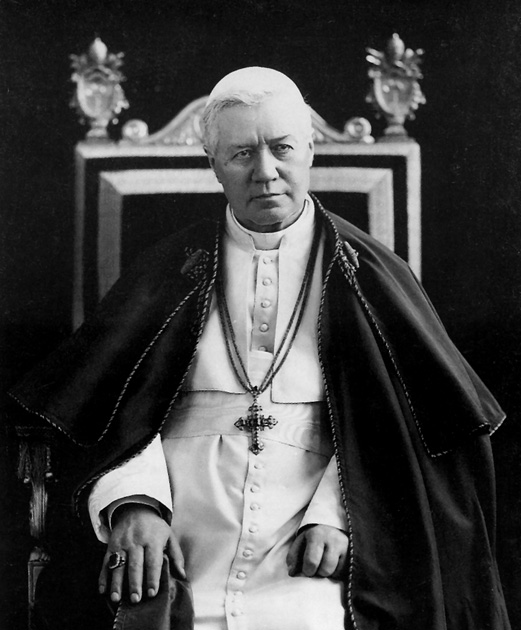
His Holiness, Pope Pius X
