= Sanctuary of Santa Maria dell'Acquasanta =

Sanctuary in Marino, Italy

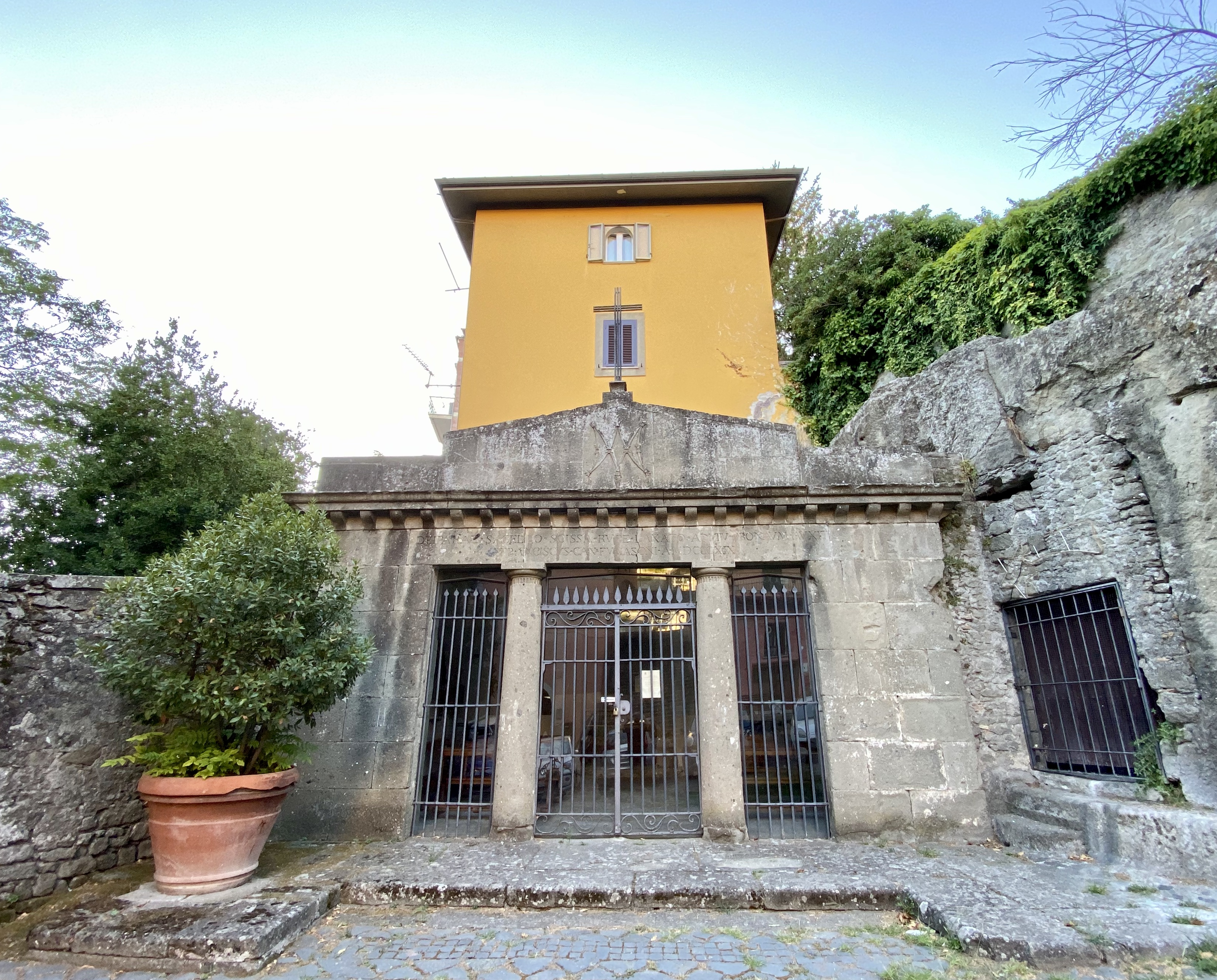
- The facade of the sanctuary (August 2020)

- 41.76812°N 12.66451°E
- Location: Marino, Lazio, Italy
- Denomination: Catholic
- Website: https://www.comune.marino.rm.gov.it/santuario-madonna-dellacqua-santa

History
- Dedication: Mary
- Consecrated: 13th century

Architecture
- Style: Romanesque, Rococo, Neoclassical
- Groundbreaking: 13th century
- Completed: 19th century

Administration
- Diocese: Diocese of Albano

The sanctuary of Santa Maria dell'Acquasanta or Acqua Santa (also referred to over the centuries as Santa Maria dell'Orto, Santa Maria d'Ammonte or even Madonna del Sasso) is a place of Catholic Marian worship in the city of Marino, in the Roman Castles area, in the metropolitan city of Rome Capital and suburbicarian diocese of Albano. It is currently included in the parish of the basilica of San Barnaba.

== History ==
The Marinesi, men and women of faith, "read" the spring in the middle of the peperino bench as a sign of God's benevolence to their City, granted through Mary's intercession, and believed it to be a source of miraculous and holy water. [...]

— Dante Bernini, bishop of the suburbicarian diocese of Albano, in Vincenzo Antonelli, La Chiesa della Madonna dell'Acquasanta in Marino, Veroli 1993, p. 3.

The image of the Madonna was probably made between the fourth and ninth centuries, according to popular tradition around the sixth century, as suggested by the way it was made as found during the last restoration of the painting and the fact that its measurements can be easily calculated in Roman feet. Later, the image was repainted between the twelfth and fourteenth centuries, and partially remodeled around the sixteenth century, and finally in the eighteenth century, when the orientation of the image was adapted to the orientation of the altar.

When the veneration of the image first began, it must have been located in an open-air roadside aedicula along the then public road leading to Castel Gandolfo and Albano Laziale, corresponding to today's Via Antonio Fratti. The image was connected to the built-up area by a staircase of thirty-four steps carved into the peperino stone, which allowed the visitor to avoid the steep bend in the road and which is still visible today at the back of the sanctuary. The veneration of the image is also linked to a miraculous event reported by popular tradition: it is said that a man, while riding his horse on the Via Maremmana Inferiore in the direction of Castel Gandolfo and Albano Laziale, lost control of the animal in the hairpin bends of the road and was in danger of falling into the precipice had not Our Lady intervened to save him. In the following centuries, other miracles were attributed to the Virgin of Acquasanta: in August 1883, the high prelate Pietro Rota, archbishop of Carthage and canon regular of the St. Peter's Basilica in Rome, made an ex voto to Mary to thank her for saving him from a ruinous fall from a horse in the precipitous paths on Lake Albano; and so many other episodes, even quite serious ones.

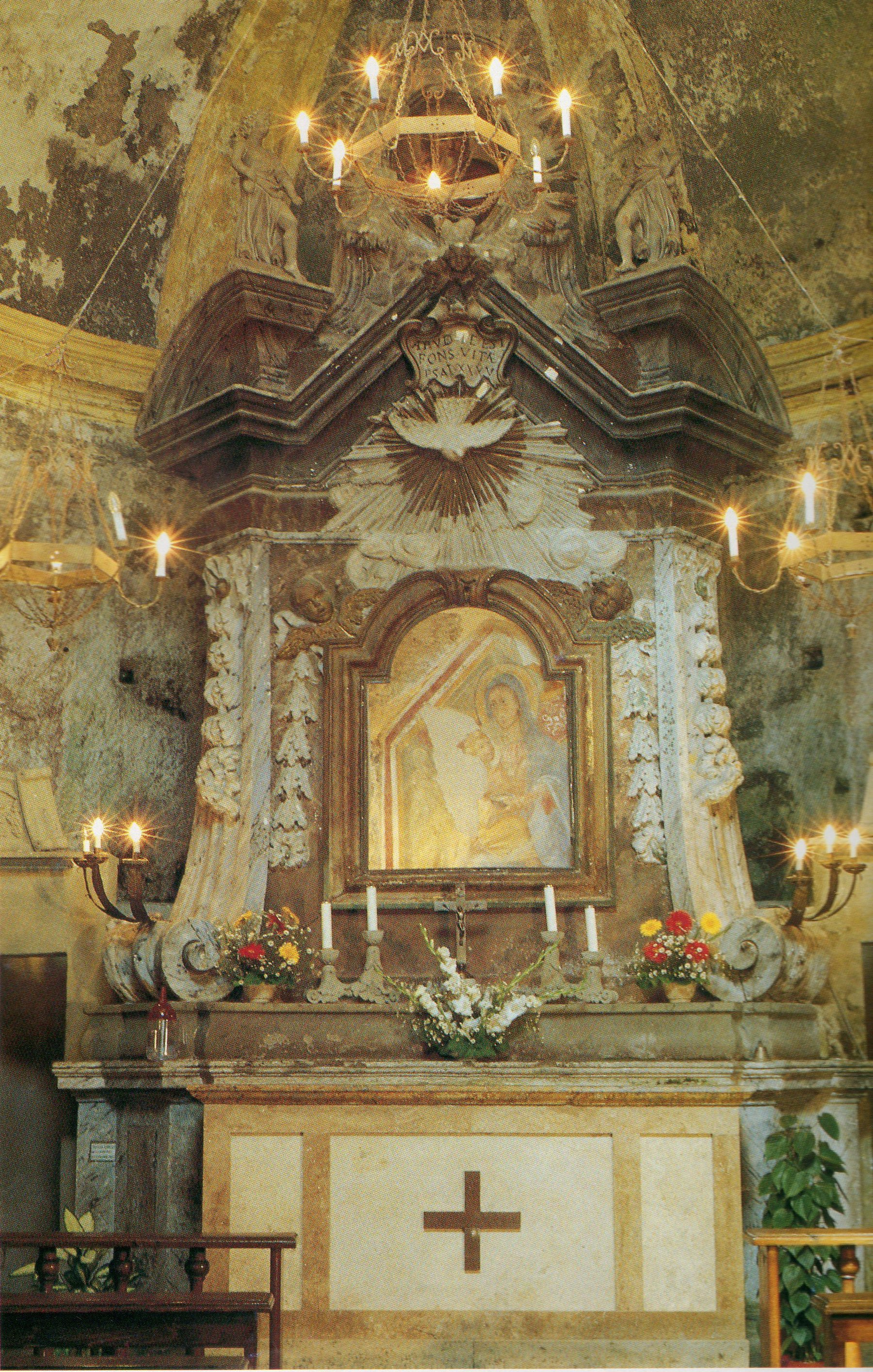
The image of Our Lady

The aedicula was visited in the summer of 1260 or at any rate in the early 1370s by St. Bonaventure of Bagnoregio, cardinal bishop of the suburbicarian diocese of Albano from 1270 to 1274, who absorbed in prayer at the Marian image and was inspired to found the archconfraternity of the Gonfalone of Marino.

Probably in the 16th century the roadside aedicula was incorporated into the first nucleus of the sanctuary, since in the 1566 cadastre of the Colonna family's properties of Marino an "ecclesia" dedicated to Our Lady "loco divotissimo" is mentioned. During the seventeenth century, the rectory located above the church was also built, as three hermits were reported to be residing there in 1682. The final appearance inside the sanctuary was determined by the work carried out between 1693 and 1720: the entire single-nave building is carved out of peperino stone and has remnants of plaster and ogives.

The Rococo altar had already been built in 1759, while two Calabrian priests Giovanni Andrea and Nicola Fico financed in 1788 the construction of the side altar of the Most Holy Crucifix, which was later used by the Secular Franciscan Order, as evidenced by the coat of arms affixed to the altar itself. In 1792 the two Calabrian priests financed the shrine again, completing the rectory tower with two more floors and building a small bell gable above it.

The current appearance of the sanctuary's facade is due to the interventions financed in 1819 by Francesco Fumasoni Biondi and commissioned to architect Matteo Lovatti, who created here one of his most celebrated and best-performed works. Between 1823 and 1824 Massimo d'Azeglio, who was staying in Marino at the time, executed a pictorial decoration in the church on commission from Fumasoni Biondi, which is now lost.

In 1926 the nobleman Riccardo Tuccimei, emphyteuta of the sanctuary then owned by the chapter of the collegiate basilica of St. Barnabas, decided to demolish the church's bell tower, a decision that, although contested by the municipality and the "Acqua Santa Society", was nevertheless implemented.

In the 1980s a restoration was carried out on the sacred image by architect Vincenzo Antonelli, which led to important results from a historical and artistic point of view.

== Description ==
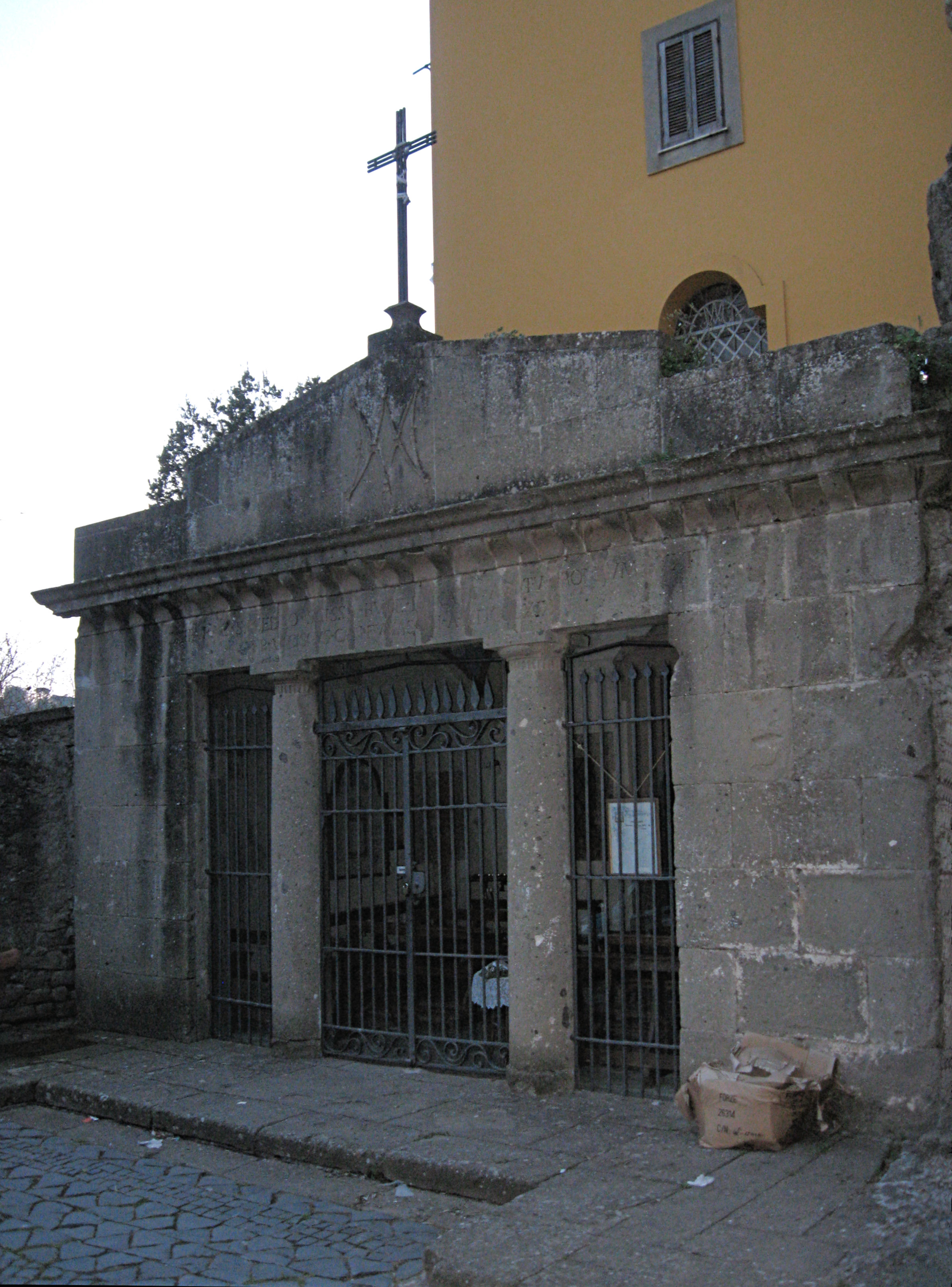
A detail of the facade

=== The facade and the narthex ===
The facade and narthex of the sanctuary were made in 1819 by architect Matteo Lovatti, also active in the same period in Velletri and Albano Laziale and awarded for his artistic merits the Order of St. Sylvester Pope, with funding from the canon regular of the basilica of St. Barnabas Francesco Fumasoni Biondi.

The facade elevation, neoclassical in style, is made entirely of peperino, with an entrance "in antis" (i.e., punctuated by two Tuscan columns) holding a molded architrave supported by a corbel that runs along the entire facade elevation. The wrought-iron gate that closes the narthex outside was placed in 1865, and is now replaced with a stained glass window. On the entablature of the facade the following inscription reads:

DEIPARAE SACELLO SCISSA RUPE LAXATO ADITU PRONAUM AUXIT
FRANCISCUS CAN FUMASONI A MDCCCXIX
In the sanctuary of the Virgin Deipara leveled
the cliff left space erected a pronaos
Francesco Fumasoni Biondi canon year 1819

The interior of the narthex is bare, raised three steps above street level (a difference in height reduced to one step after the sanctuary square was paved in sanpietrini in the early 20th century). The inner doorway of the church, originally located directly outside, was made in the 18th century and features molded imposts and an arched tympanum in the center of which a coat of arms was probably placed, as depicted by some prints and drawings.

=== The interior of the sanctuary ===
The interior of the sanctuary has a single nave, with the right side carved entirely out of peperino, so that the only window is located on the left wall, above the altar of the Most Holy Crucifix, the church's only side altar. The presence of ogives would suggest that originally the walls and vault were plastered, however in its present state the rock is left exposed, with patches of moisture evident in places. The perimeter of the hall is traversed by a sturdy cornice.

In the right wall there is a cut in the peperino, probably an ancient aqueduct that served the cave near the sanctuary, which some have speculated to be a Roman or pre-Roman sanctuary, located near the Ferentano Woods consecrated to the indigenous Latin deity Ferentina.

On the left wall, there is a marble plaque affixed by Calabrian priests Giovanni Andrea and Nicola Fico in 1788 in celebration of their funding for the construction of the side altar of the Holy Crucifix. The plaque reads as follows:

ARAM HANC IESU CHRISTO CRUCIFIXO
CUIUS NOBILE SIGNUM EXIBET
SACRAM
IOHANNES ANDREAS FICO
ET
NICOLAUS FRATRIS FILIUS
PRESBYTERI MESSURGAGENSES
SYBERITANAE DIOCESIS
IN BRUTIIS ULTERIORIBUS
AERE SUO CONSTRUI ET EXORNARI
CURARUNT
ANNO A VIRGINIS PARTU MDCCLXXXVIII
This altar of Jesus Christ Crucified
whose noble symbol it exhibits
sacred
Giovanni Andrea Fico
and
Nicola son of his brother
priests of Mesoraca
in the diocese of Santa Severina
in Calabria Ulterior
at their own expense they built and adorned
they cured
in the year since the birth of the Virgin 1788

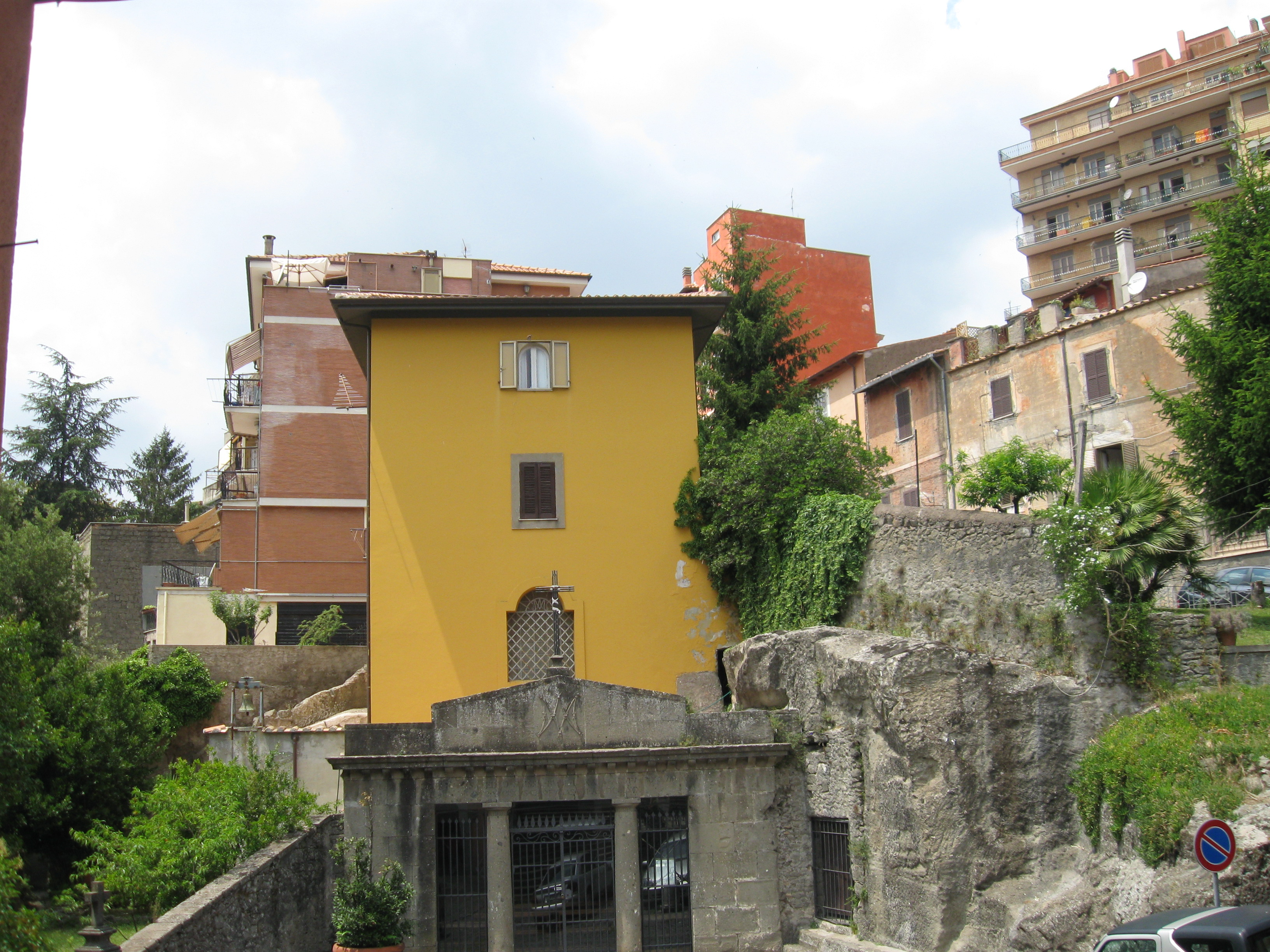
Another view of the sanctuary. Note the bell placed on the roof of the sacristy, to the left of the church, after the small bell tower was demolished.

The same altar of the Crucifix was thus built at the end of the eighteenth century out of devotion to these two Calabrian priests, and it does not present any notable details of attention, also because it was remodeled at various times: the Secular Franciscan Order, for example, had its own coat of arms in white marble on a blue field affixed in the oval of the tympanum. Between 1823 and 1824 the same canon Fumasoni Biondi who had financed the construction of the facade donated a life-size wooden crucifix to the altar and asked Massimo d'Azeglio, who was vacationing in Marino at the time, to make a pictorial frame for the sacred image. Moreover, the painter, a future president of the Council of Ministers of the Kingdom of Italy, was helped in the work by two brigands who had taken refuge in the sanctuary to escape arrest, a sign that it was possible for common criminals to have the right of asylum in the sanctuary. Currently, both the crucifix, which was probably moved before World War II to the basilica of St. Barnabas and replaced with a 19th-century polychrome wooden crucifix of medium size, and the fresco have been lost. Marinese historian Girolamo Torquati believes that the Most Holy Crucifix of Marino was originally displayed in the sanctuary, an image that began to work miracles in June 1635, and was moved to the church of the Holy Trinity, where it is still kept, by the religious congregation of the Clerics Regular Minor in June 1637.

The high altar, carved from a large block of isolated peperino stone probably in the eighteenth century, houses the Marian image framed by festoons and stucco volutes, and surmounted by two broken tympanums in the center of which reads the inscription in Latin: "apud Te est fons vitae - Psal XXXV" ("at you is the source of life," "Psalm 35"). On the two tympanums, two small statues depicting curly-haired children are placed: in the center, a small roundel depicting God and the Holy Spirit stands to represent, in connection with the Child Jesus below, the Trinity.

=== The sacristy ===
Access to the sacristy is provided by a bronze door, a recent work by Marinese painter and sculptor Stefano Piali (2005), depicting the miracle of Our Lady of Aquasanta. The peperino imposts of the door are ancient.

The sacristy room is a rectangular room with a pavilion-vaulted ceiling covered with eighteenth-century stuccoes now largely ruined. Outside the sacristy is a small garden, which scholar Vincenzo Antonelli speculates was the "kitchen garden" that gave the place of worship its first name: Here is located the staircase carved into the peperino stone that was the original access to the Marian image before the church was built.

=== The rectory tower ===
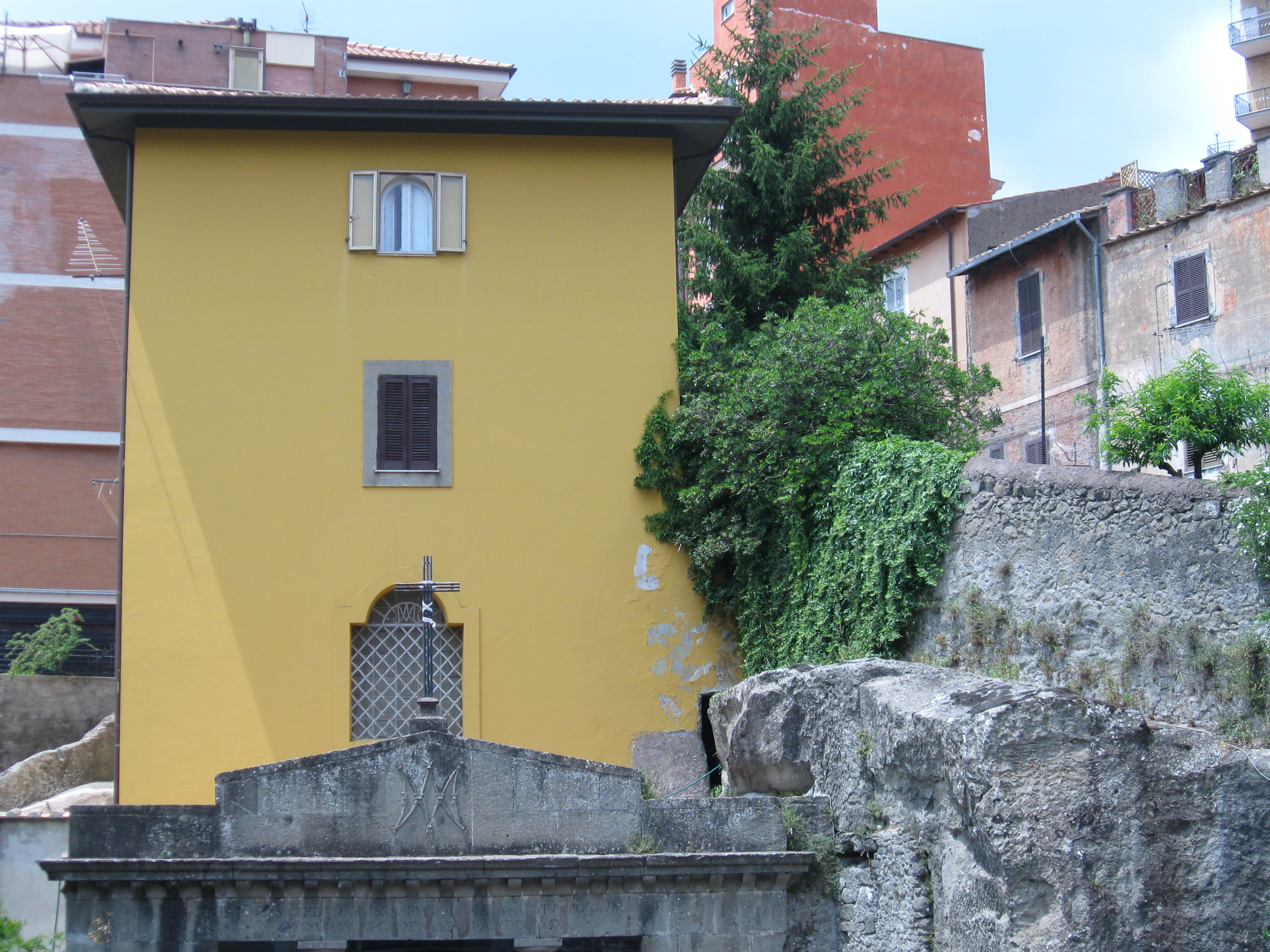
The rectory tower and, at lower right, the cut in the rock cliff

Above the church rises a two-story tower, which already existed in the second half of the 16th century and was raised in the late 18th century. At the top of the tower stood a small bell gable, demolished in the 1920s: of the two bells placed there, one has been lost, while the other is still used inside the sanctuary. Both were cast on the same date the bell tower was built, 1792, thanks to funding from the aforementioned Calabrian priests Giovanni Andrea and Nicola Fico.

An epigraph celebrating the work done in the church on this occasion is placed on the wall of the tower facing Antonio Fratti Street:

NOLAS ET TURRIM SACRAM IN
HONOREM DEIPARAE VIRGINIS
QUAM SINGULARI AMORI ET CULTU
PROSECUTI IOHANNES ANDREAS
ET NICOLAUS FICO PRESBYTERI
MESSUGAGENSES SYBERITANA
DIOCESIS IN BRUTTIS ULTERIORIBUS
S.R.E. COSTRUI ET EXORNANT
CURARUNT AN AB EIUSDEM
VIRGINIS PARTUM CICICCCXLII
The bells and the bell tower in
honor of the Virgin Deipara
driven by such singular love and devotion
priests Giovanni Andrea
and Nicola Fico
of Mesoraca in the archdiocese of Santa Severina
in Calabria Ulterior
for the church they cared
to build and adorn
in the year since the birth of the Virgin 1792

== See also ==
- Marino, Lazio
- Roman Castles
- Roman Catholic Suburbicarian Diocese of Albano

== Bibliography ==
- Antonelli, Vincenzo (1993). La chiesa della Madonna dell'Acquasanta in Marino (1 ed.). Veroli: Tipolitografia dell'Abbazia di Casamari.
- Lucarelli, Antonia (1982). Le confraternite del Gonfalone e della Carità a Marino. Biblioteca Girolamo Torquati.
- Moroni, Gaetano (1844). Dizionario di erudizione storico-ecclesiastica. Vol. 42 (1 ed.). Venezia: Tipografia Emiliana.
- Riccy, Giovanni Antonio (1787). Memorie storiche dell'antichissima Alba Longa e dell'Albano moderno. Vol. XLV. Stamperia Giovanni Zempel.
- Rufo, Vittorio (1991). Marino - Immagini di una città. Marino: Banca di Roma.
- Tomassetti, Giuseppe; Tomassetti, Francesco (1910). La campagna romana antica, medioevale e moderna IV (1 ed.). Turin: Loescher.
- Torquati, Girolamo (1856). Cenni storici sulla immagine miracolosa del Santissimo Crocifisso che si onora in Marino. Pallotta.
