= Sett (paving) =

Rectangular stone for surfacing roads and walkways

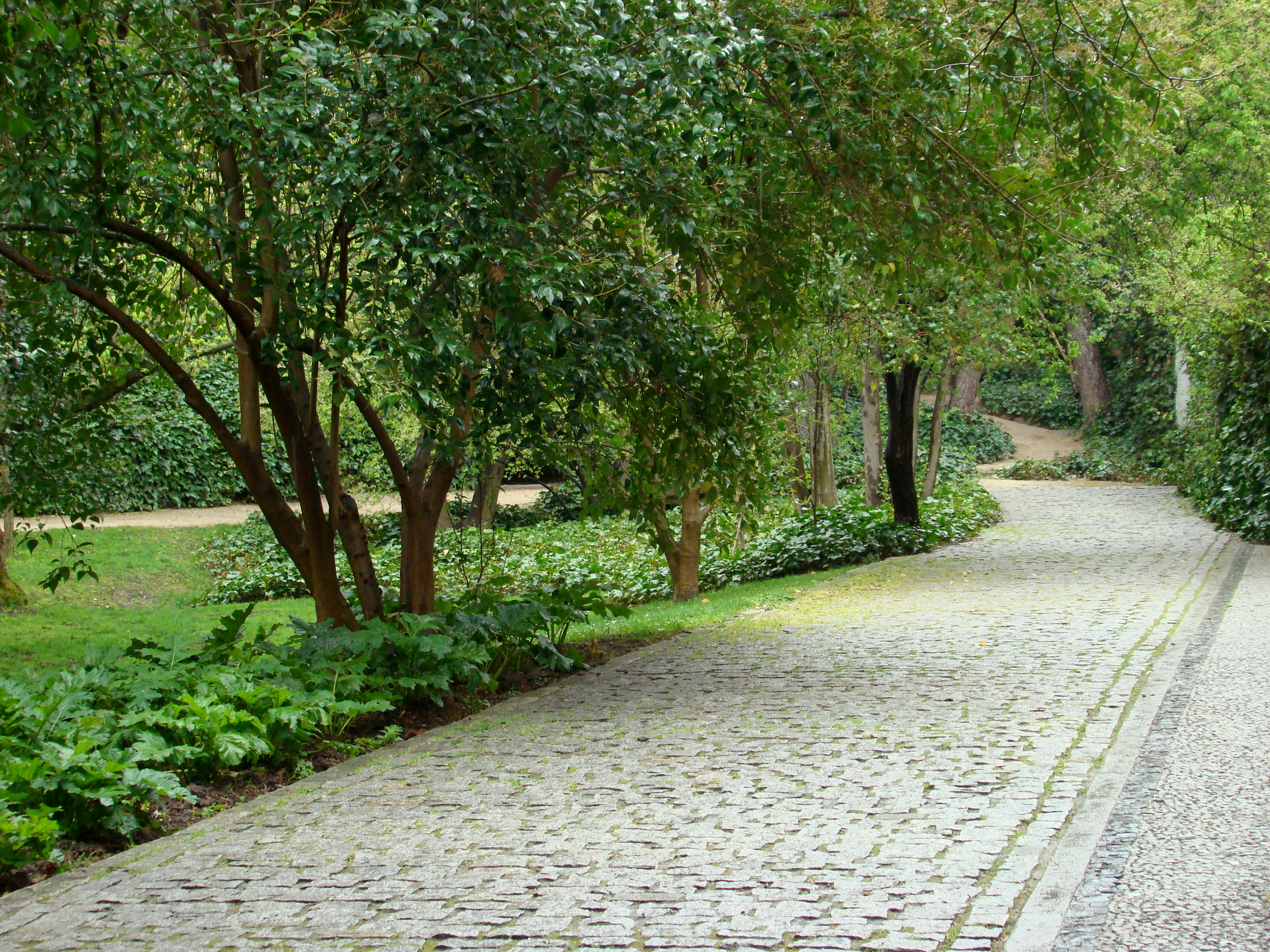
Sett paving in Quinta de los Molinos park in Madrid, Spain.

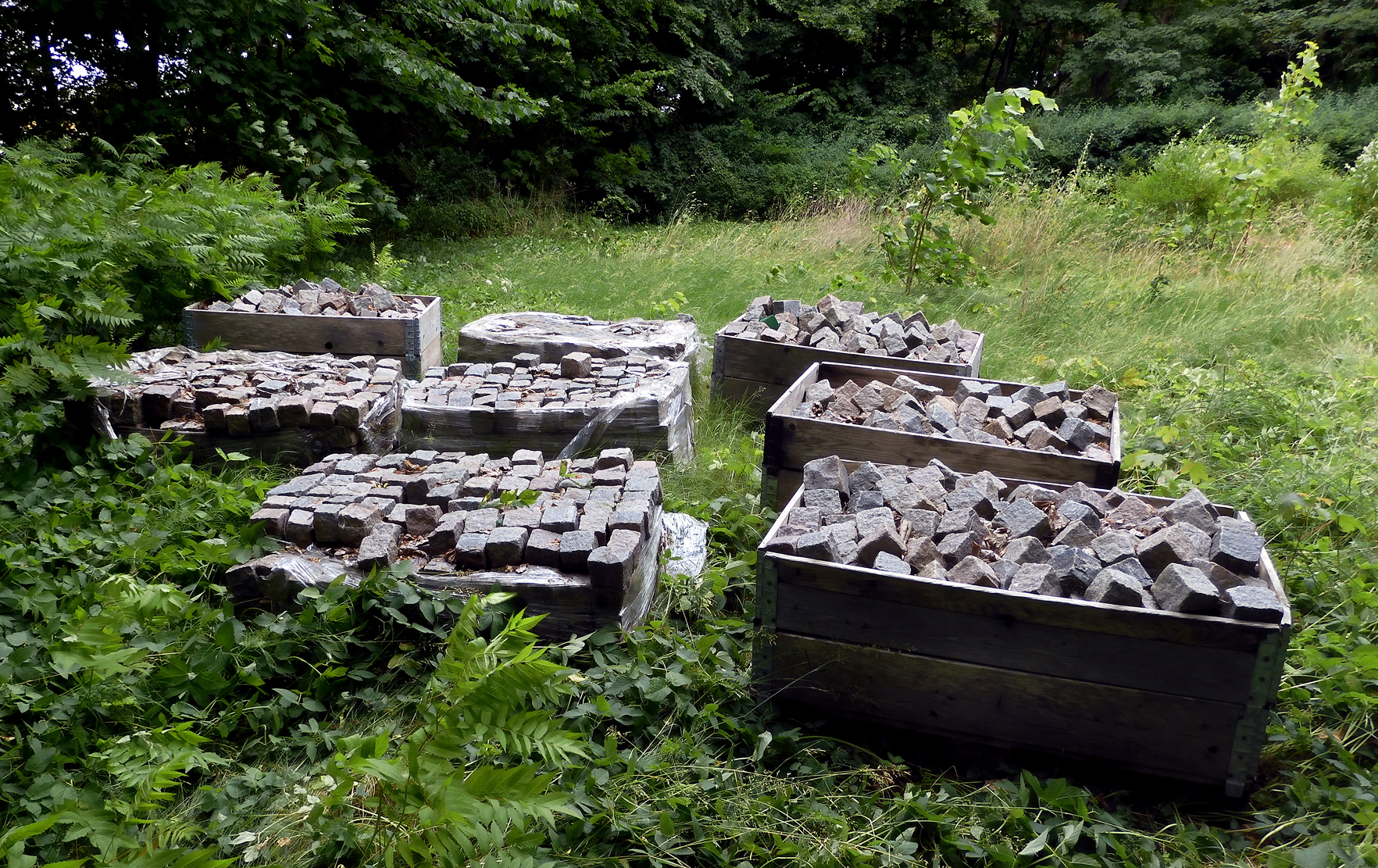
Setts in pallet collars.

A sett, also known as a block or Belgian block, is a broadly rectangular quarried stone used in paving roads and walkways. Formerly in widespread use, particularly on steeper streets because setts provided horses' hooves with better grip than a smooth surface, they are now encountered more usually as decorative stone paving in landscape architecture. Setts may be referred to incorrectly as cobblestones, but a sett is distinct from a cobblestone in that it is quarried or worked to a regular shape, whereas the latter is generally a small, naturally rounded rock. Setts are usually made of granite.

== Places ==
=== Europe ===
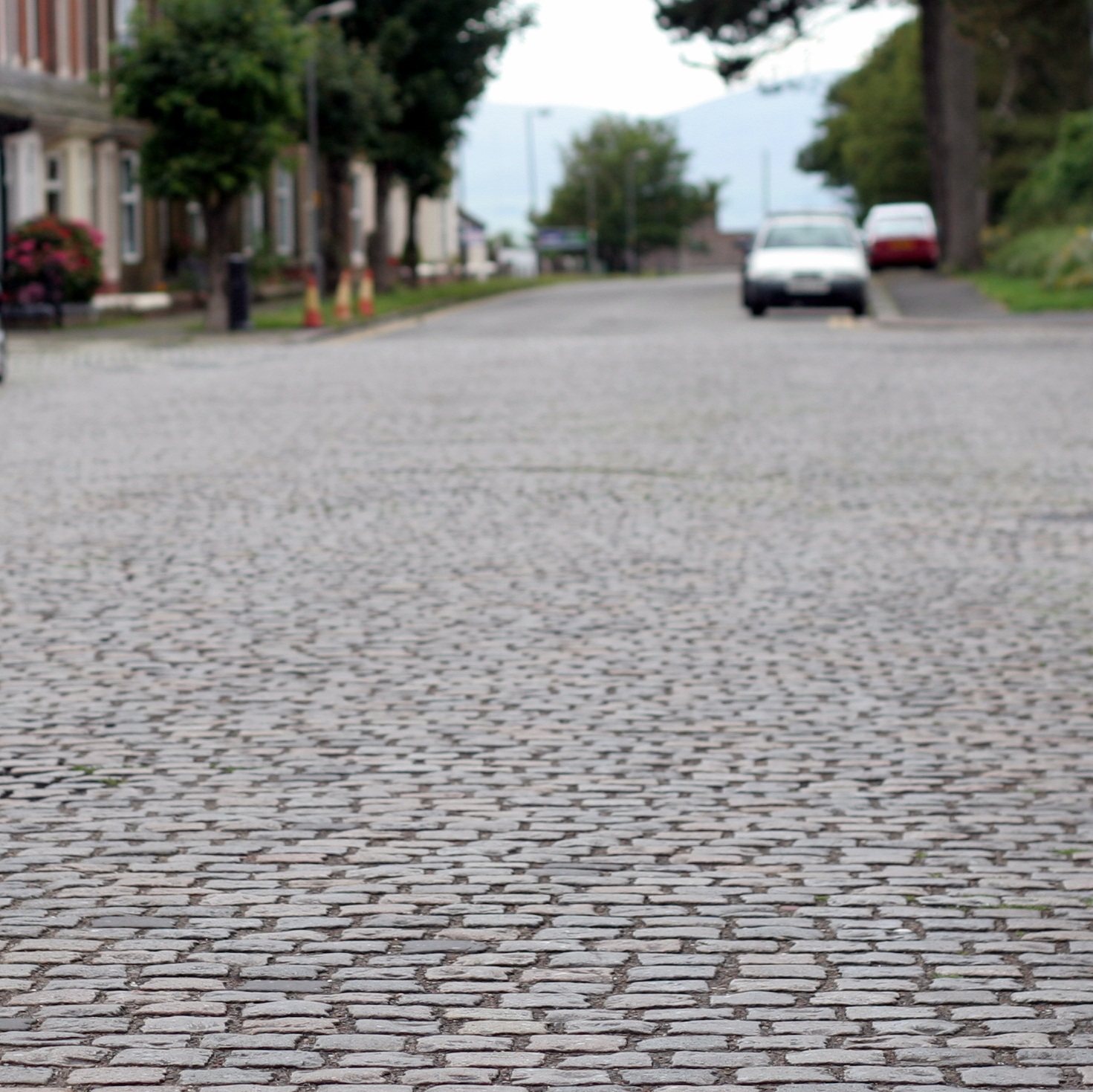
The setts at the junction of Eden Street and Criffel Street in Silloth-on-Solway, Cumbria, UK.

Places paved with setts include many streets in Rome and elsewhere in Italy (where blocks are called sampietrini or bolognini), since the technique was first used by Romans.

In Aberdeen (Scotland), and much of Edinburgh's Old Town and New Town, a large number of streets retain the original setts.

Silloth on Solway, a seaside town in Cumbria, still has setts (originally laid in the 19th century) on Eden St and the seafront Criffel Street. Streets paved with setts feature in cycling competitions, including the "Tour of Britain", which visited Silloth on Solway in 2015.

St. Anne, Alderney, the main town of Alderney in the Channel Islands, has many streets constructed of locally quarried granite setts. They continue to be maintained and replaced today.

Streets in Belgian towns are historically layered with Belgian blocks, both in the centre areas and the outer residential neighbourhoods. However, in recent years, many of them have been progressively replaced by asphalt in order to reduce car noise and improve conditions for commuter cycling. Many streets and roads in Belgium and remote country routes just over the border in northern France are still dominated by setts, with some gaining notoriety through bicycle races such as the Paris–Roubaix race and the Tour of Flanders race.

Streets in the old part of Danish towns are also often layered with sett, known as brosten or bridge-stones. To make it easier to bike on, the part of the road meant for bicycles are paved with special stones that are saw-cut on top for smoothness and jet-burned for friction. Vendersgade in Copenhagen is the latest CycleStreet to get jet-burned and saw-cut setts on the part of the road between Israels Plads and Torvehallerne to create cohesion between the square and the market area, and make it safe for pedestrians to cross the cyclestreet.

In addition to streets, large public squares also employed setts, as seen at Moscow's Red Square.

=== United States ===
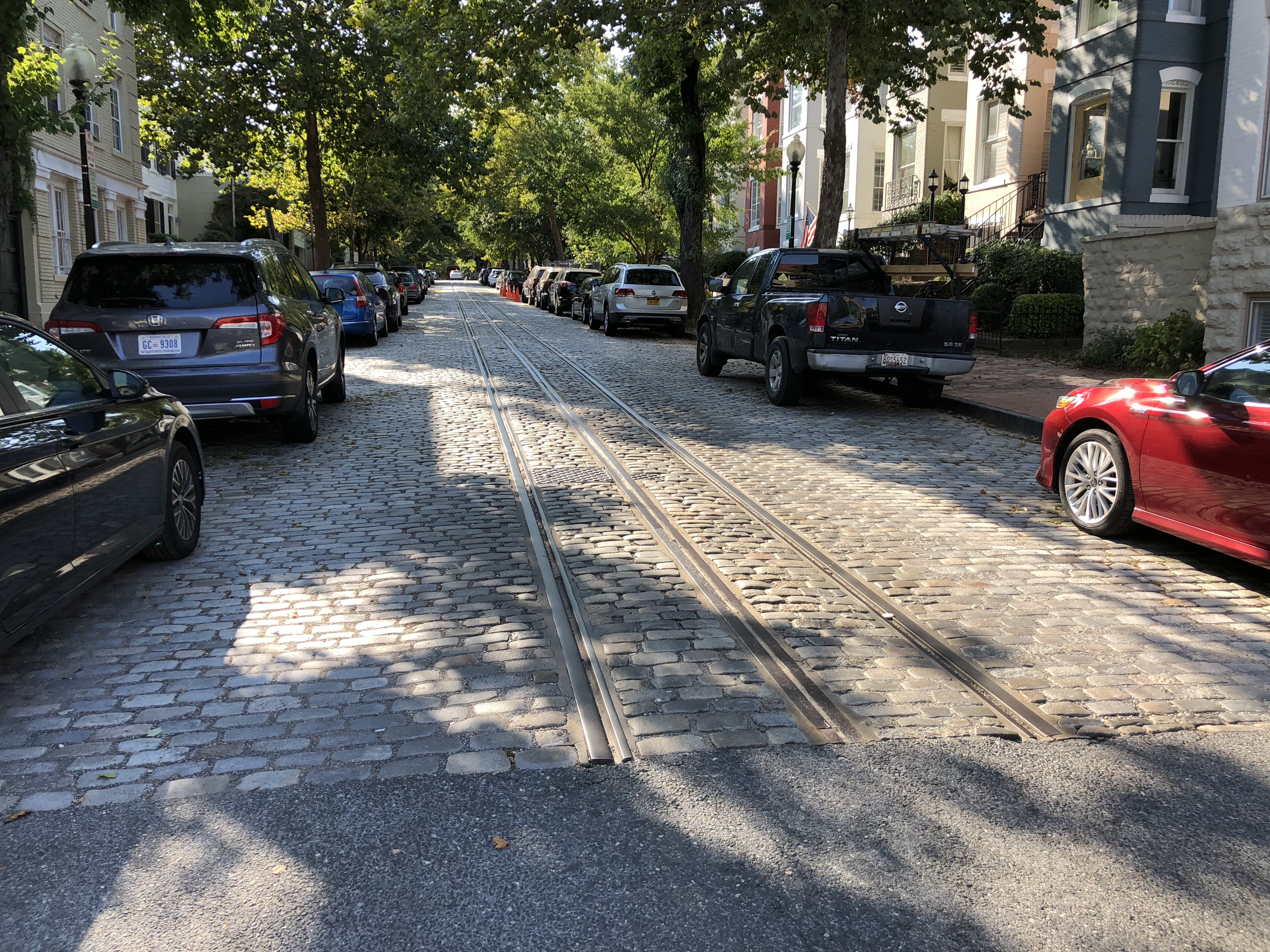
Sett paving in Georgetown, Washington, D.C.

In New York City, the West Village (including the Meatpacking District), SoHo, and TriBeCa neighbourhood retain such streets. The Holland Tunnel used the blocks extensively and can still be seen in some spots including under pavement of service roads on the New Jersey side. Older sections of Brooklyn such as DUMBO and surrounding neighbourhoods also have streets bearing Belgian blocks.

In the Dearing Street Historic District of Athens, Georgia, Finley Street, between Broad Street and The Tree That Owns Itself, retains Belgian blocks, the only street in the city to be so paved.

Germantown Avenue in Philadelphia, in particular its upper reaches through Germantown, Mount Airy and Chestnut Hill, is notable for being paved with Belgian blocks; repaving projects on this thoroughfare have retained or reintroduced block paving to give additional historic character to these neighbourhoods. Part of this character includes the tracks of the 23 trolley, though the modern tracks are encased in concrete slabs rather than blocks, and the trolley line itself is currently operated by buses.

In Richmond, Virginia, Belgian block streets are particularly common, most notably in Shockoe Slip. Street cars travelled through the street on tracks that are still visible though the system has been replaced by buses.

The Fells Point neighbourhood of Baltimore also has Belgian block streets.

In many cities besides Richmond and Philadelphia setts have often been used for pavement around street-running trolley or tram lines in the same manner as brickwork.

Portland, Oregon, used Belgian block paving extensively in the 19th century, starting near the Willamette River, to stop the streets from washing away in floods. Many streets in older parts of the city are underlain by these blocks, and a few streets in the Pearl District still feature this kind of pavement. The City of Portland stockpiles these blocks when they are dug up for street or utility repairs or renovation. They have been used between the rails in some of TriMet's MAX light rail lines to warn automobile drivers that they are driving on light rail right of way. The romantic claim that old Portland "cobbles" were imported as ship's ballast is incorrect; they are local basalt, quarried near St. Helens in Oregon.

== Archaeological ==
In older towns and cities setts may be used to outline buried archaeological features beneath the road surface such as city walls, gates and cathedrals, for example the first Rochester Cathedral.

== Sett sizes and colours ==
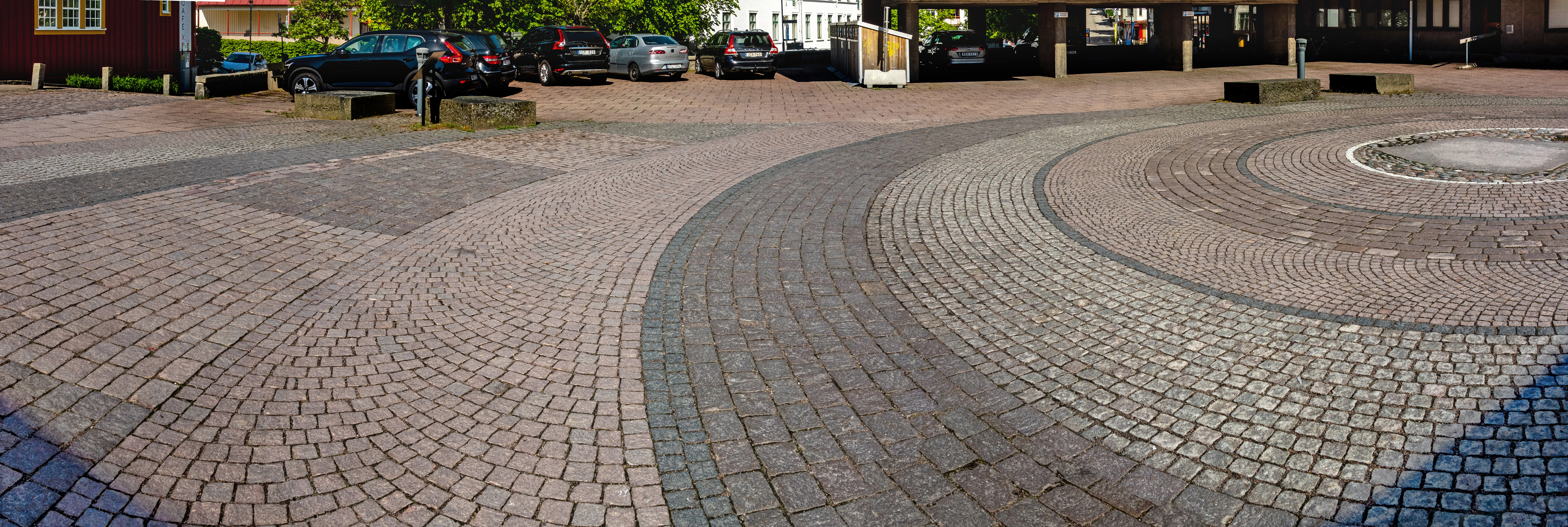
Samples of setts in Lysekil, Sweden, quarried and cut in Bohuslän, once a major producer of granite setts. The image has notations about the different types of setts; they can also be identified by an information board (in Swedish).

== Accessibility ==
Belgian blocks may present accessibility challenges for disabled people, particularly wheelchair users. The United States Access Board states that "cobblestones, Belgian blocks, and similar materials can be difficult and sometimes painful to negotiate with wheeled mobility aids due to the vibrations they cause."

== Examples ==
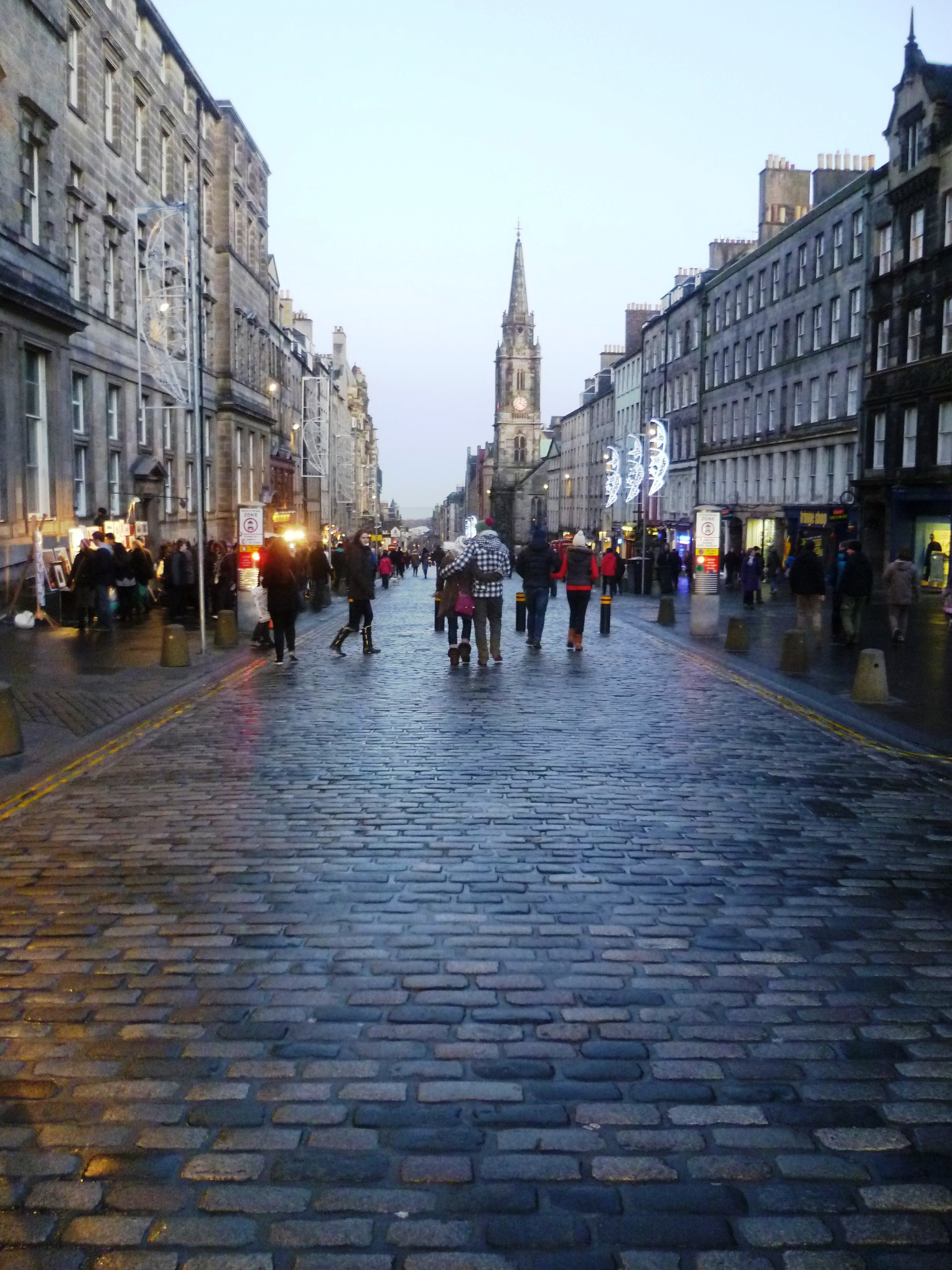
Much of the Royal Mile in Edinburgh, Scotland, is laid with granite setts, as here looking east towards the Tron Kirk.

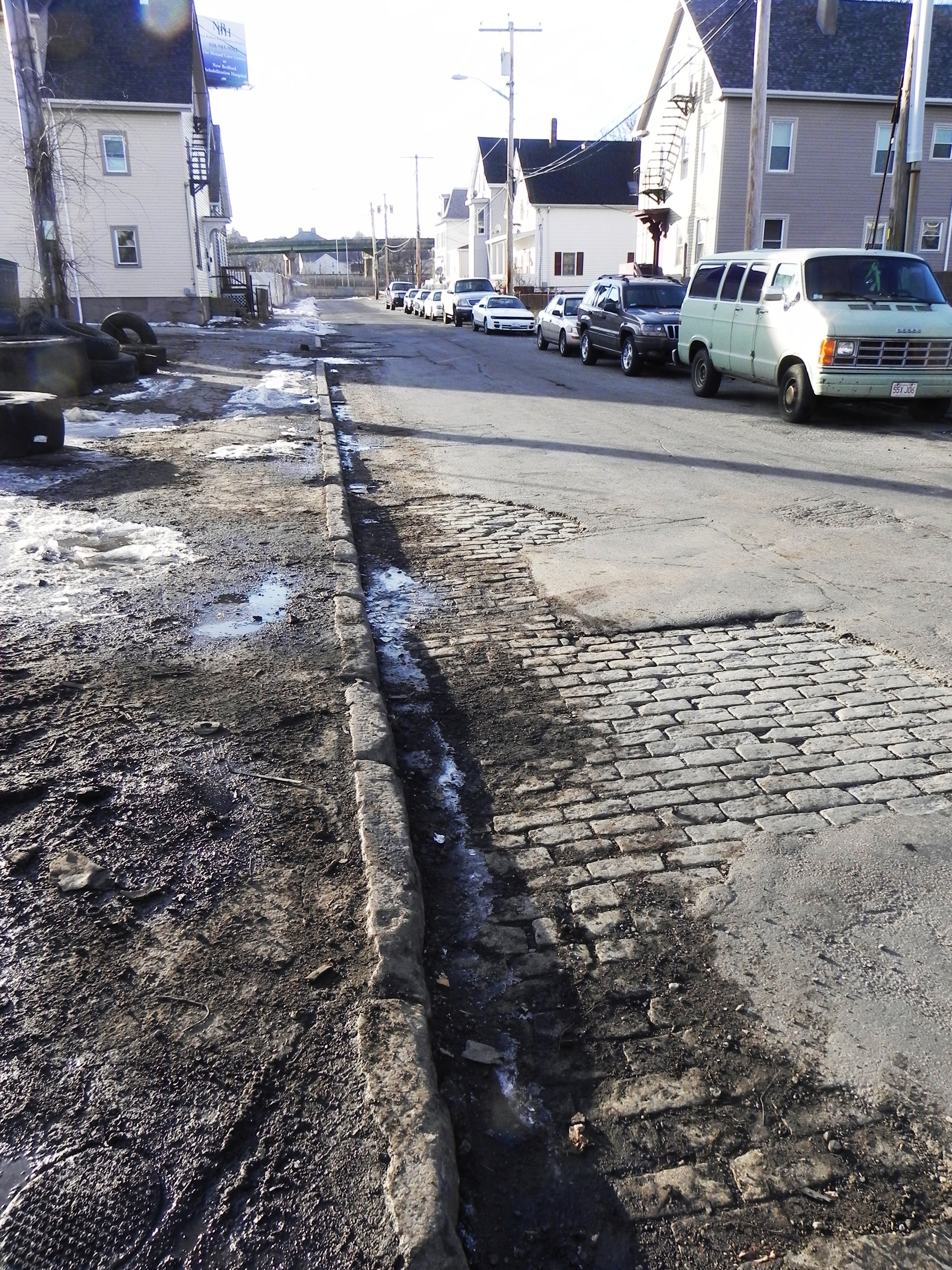
Setts visible beneath cracked asphalt in New Bedford, Massachusetts, United States.

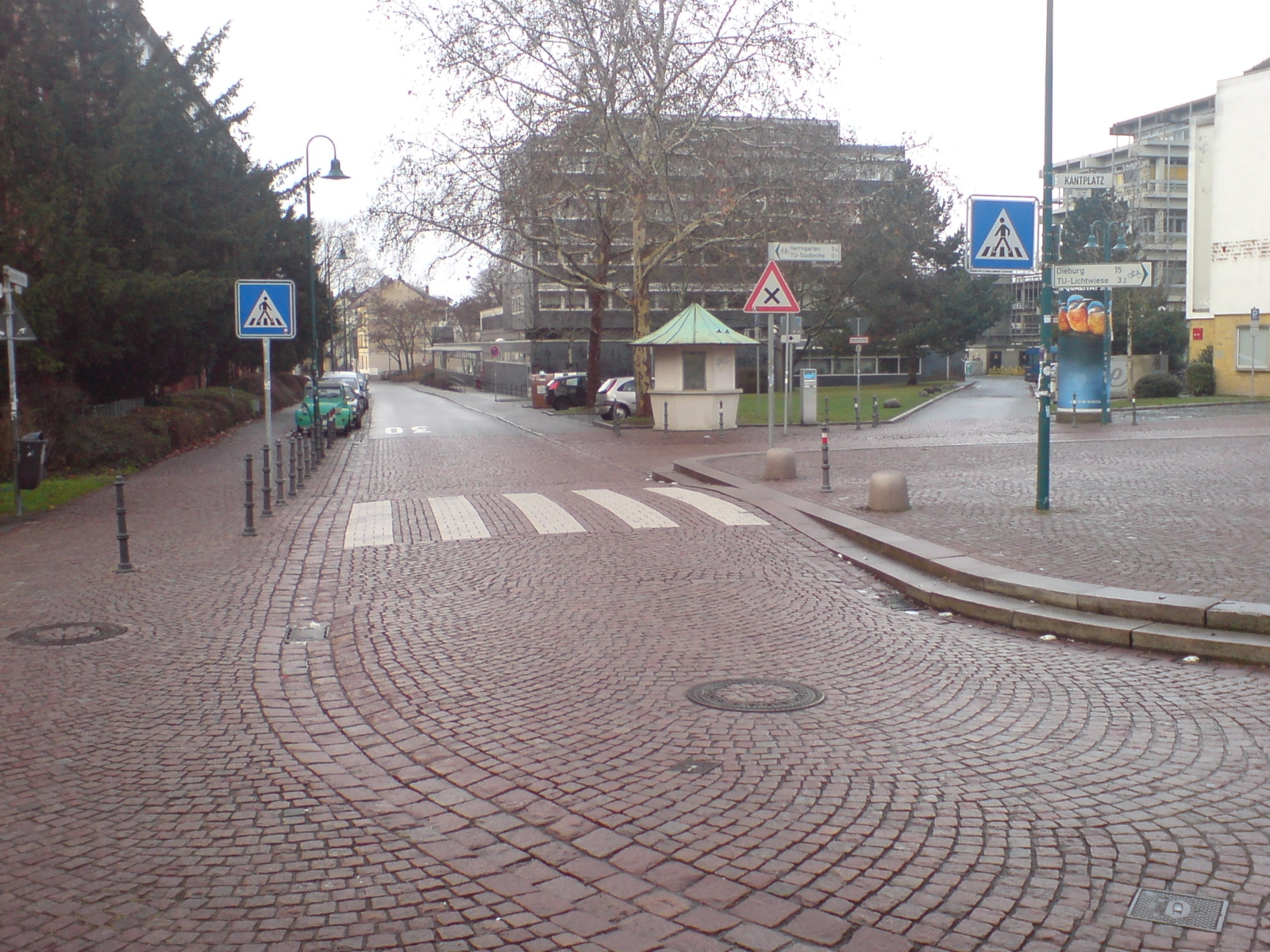
A street in Darmstadt, Germany, in the 2000s paved with setts.

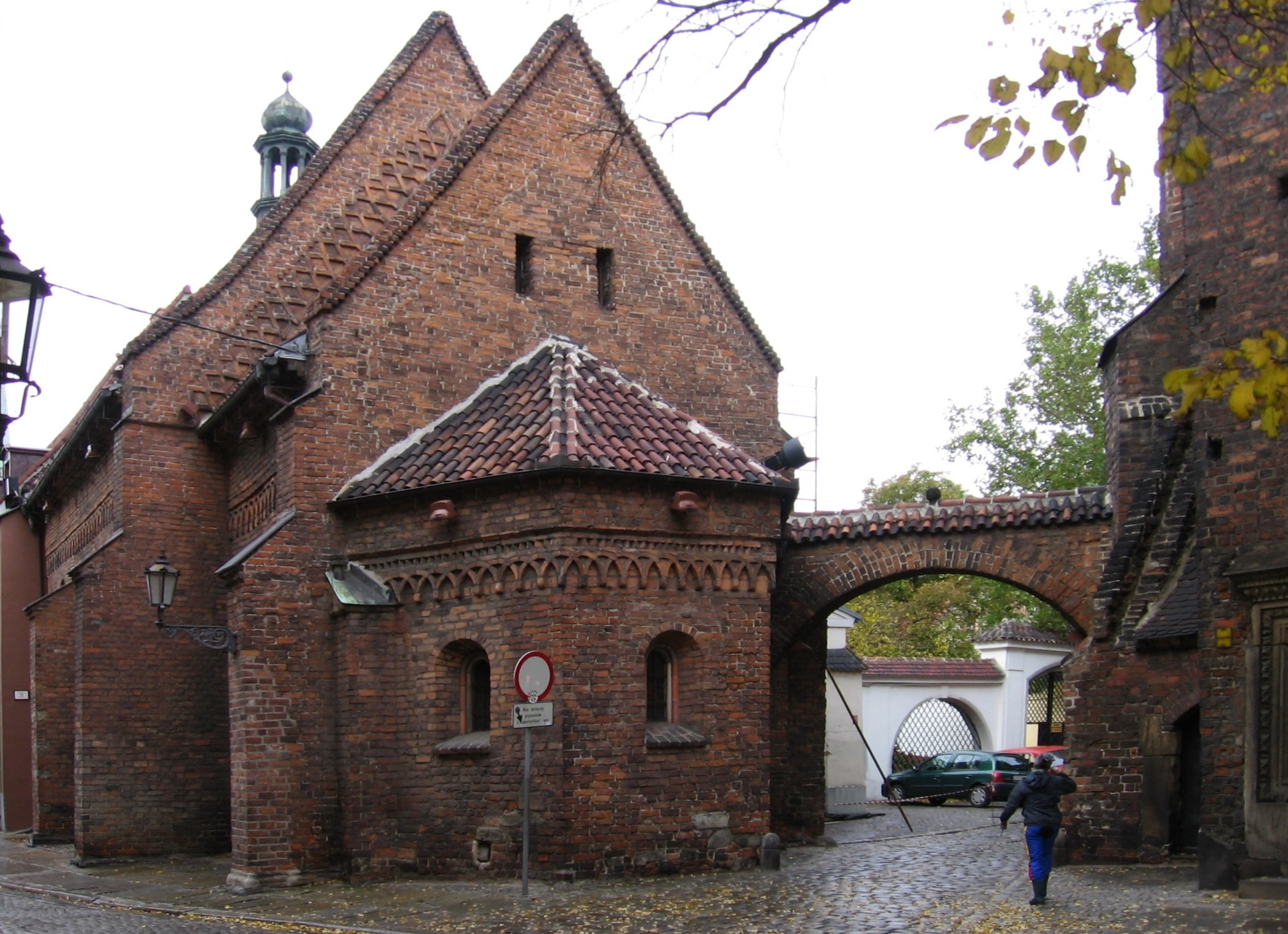
Around St Giles' Church in Wrocław, Poland.

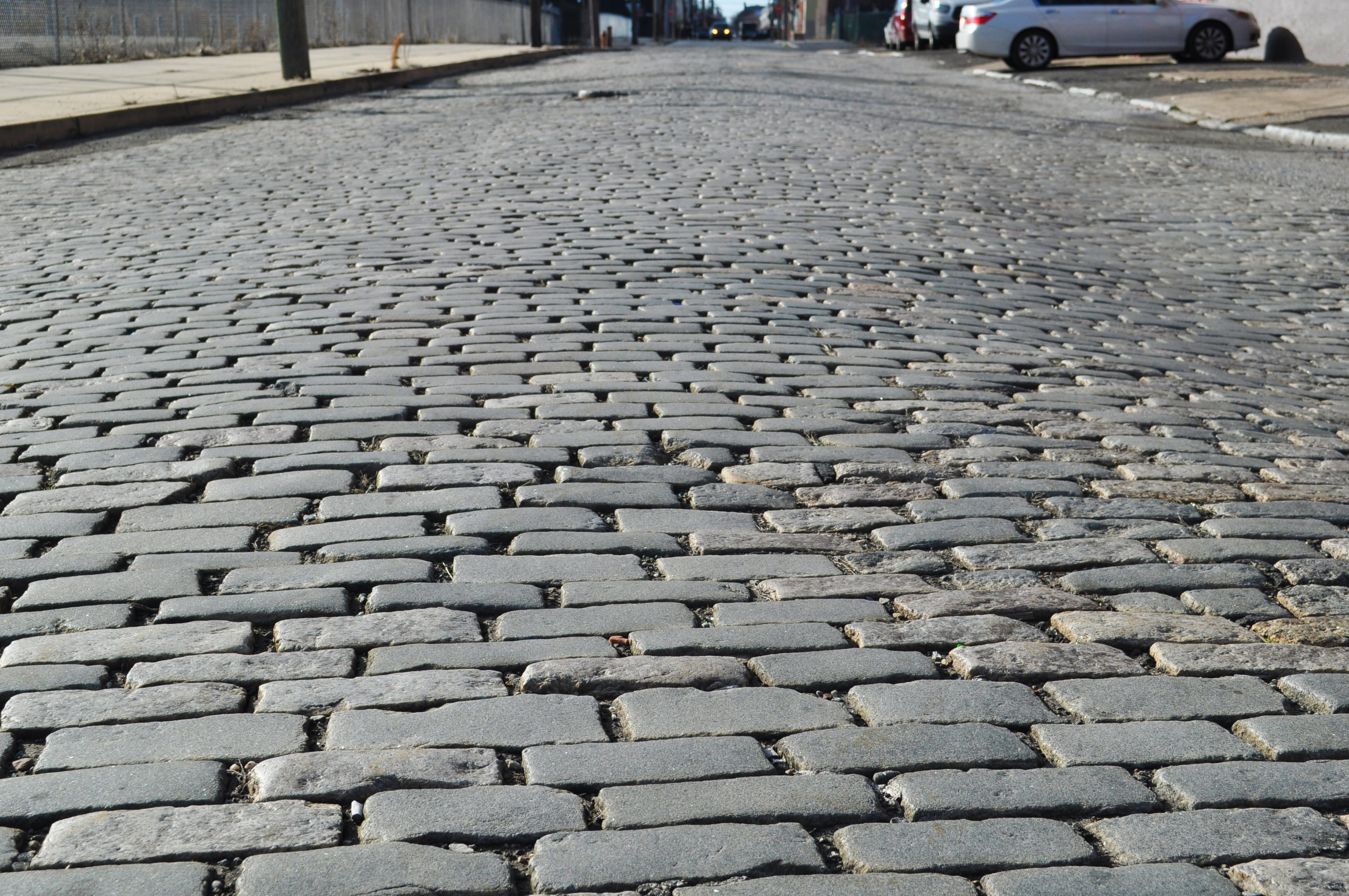
Wolf St. at Weccacoe Ave. in Philadelphia.

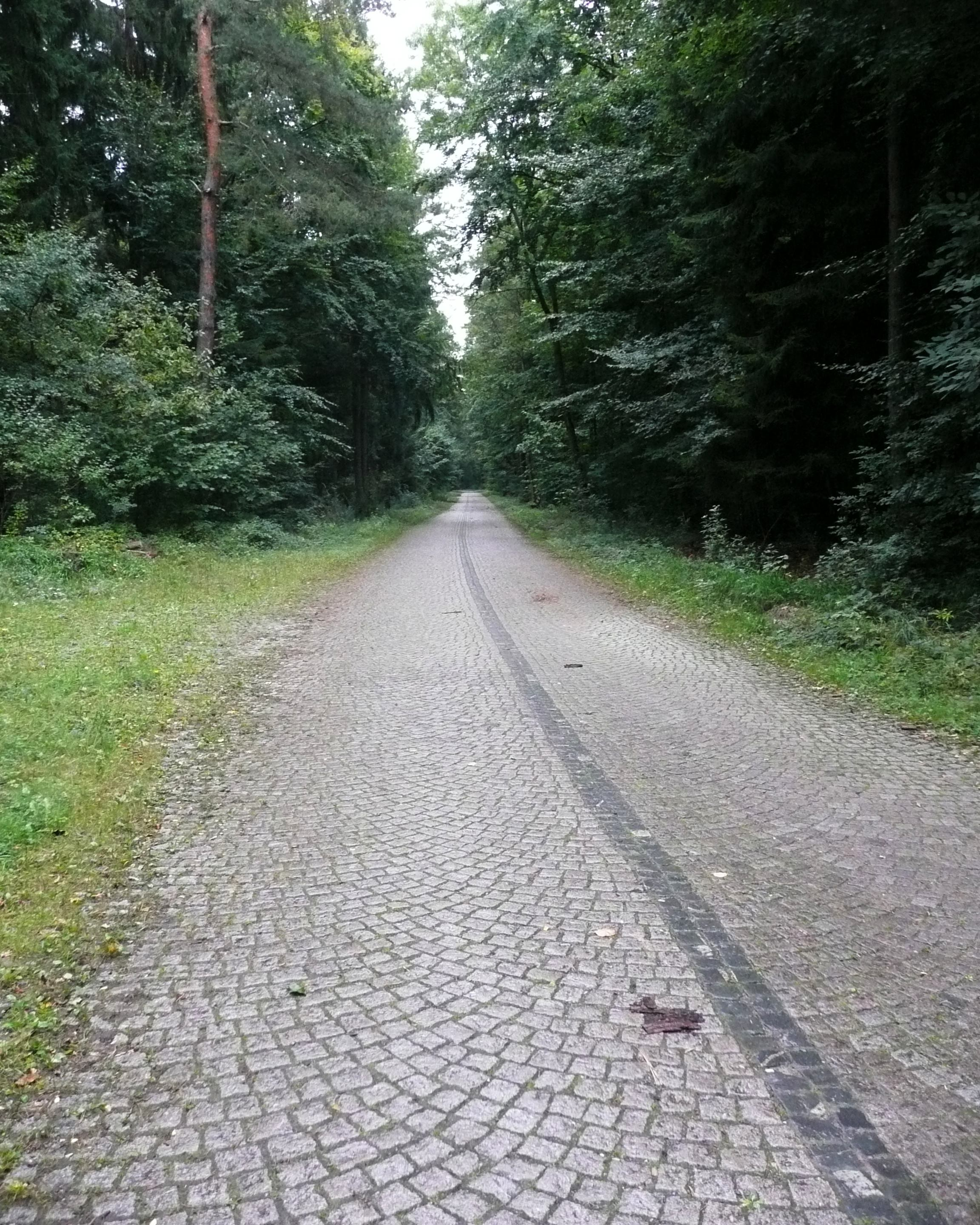
Sett-paved tank trail in Stuttgart, Germany.

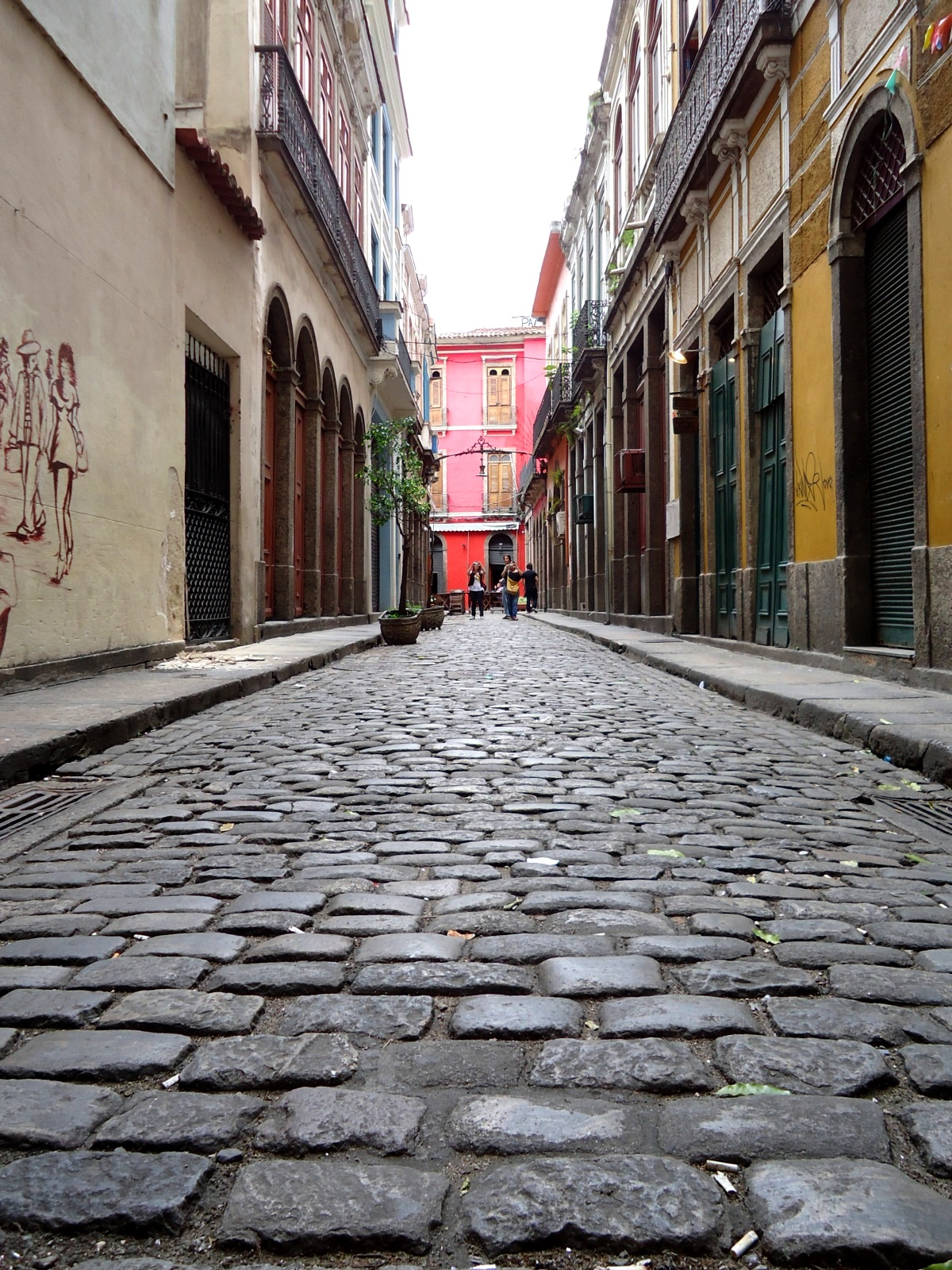
Travessa do Comércio in Rio de Janeiro, Brazil. Portuguese-born Brazilian singer and actress Carmen Miranda lived at number 13 during her youth.

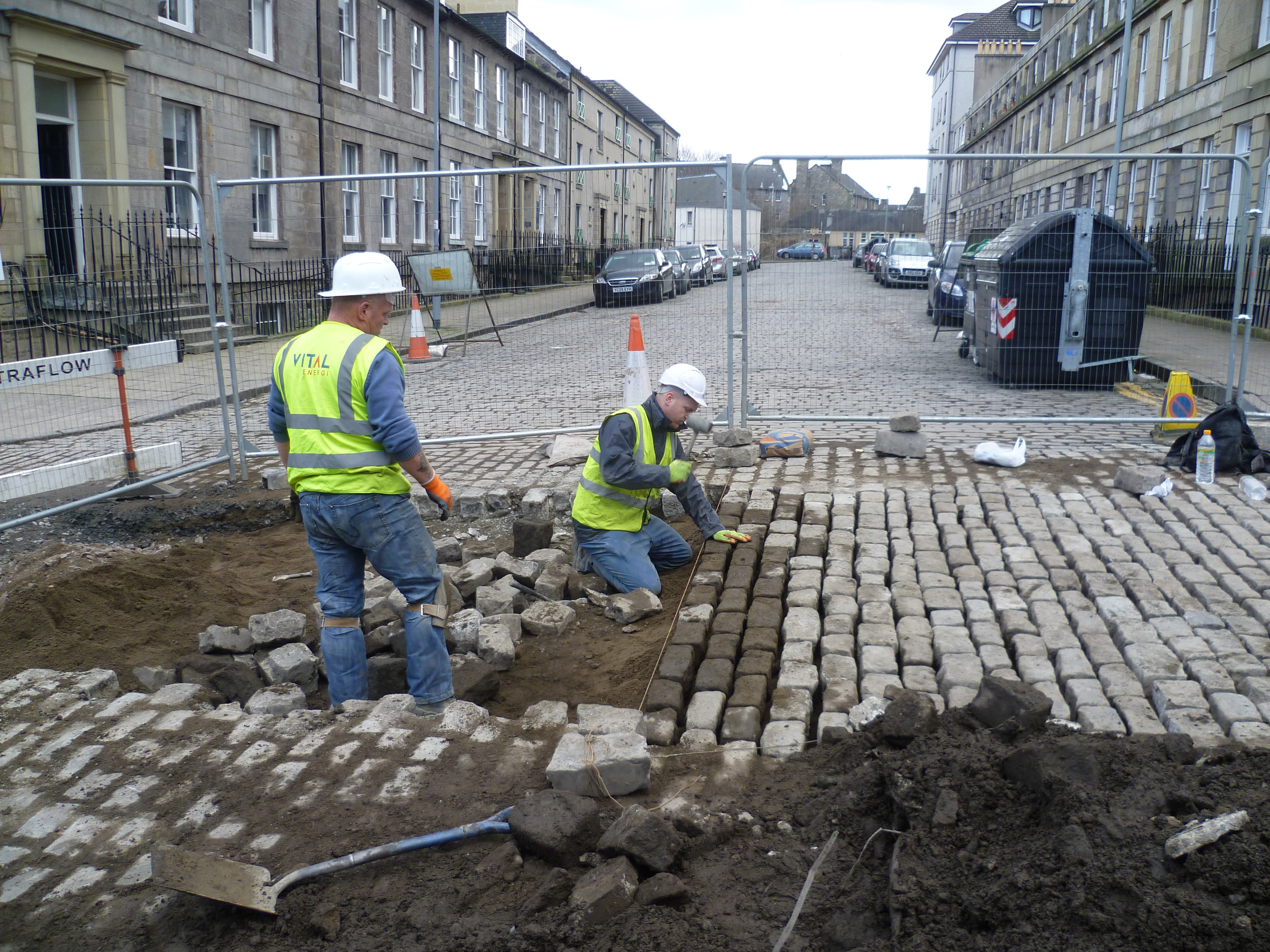
Laying setts in Edinburgh, Scotland, in 2013.

== See also ==
- Flagstone
- Nicolson pavement
- Sampietrini
