= Giovanni Corti =

Italian priest and bishop (1797–1868)

Monsignor Giovanni Corti
- Bishop of Mantua
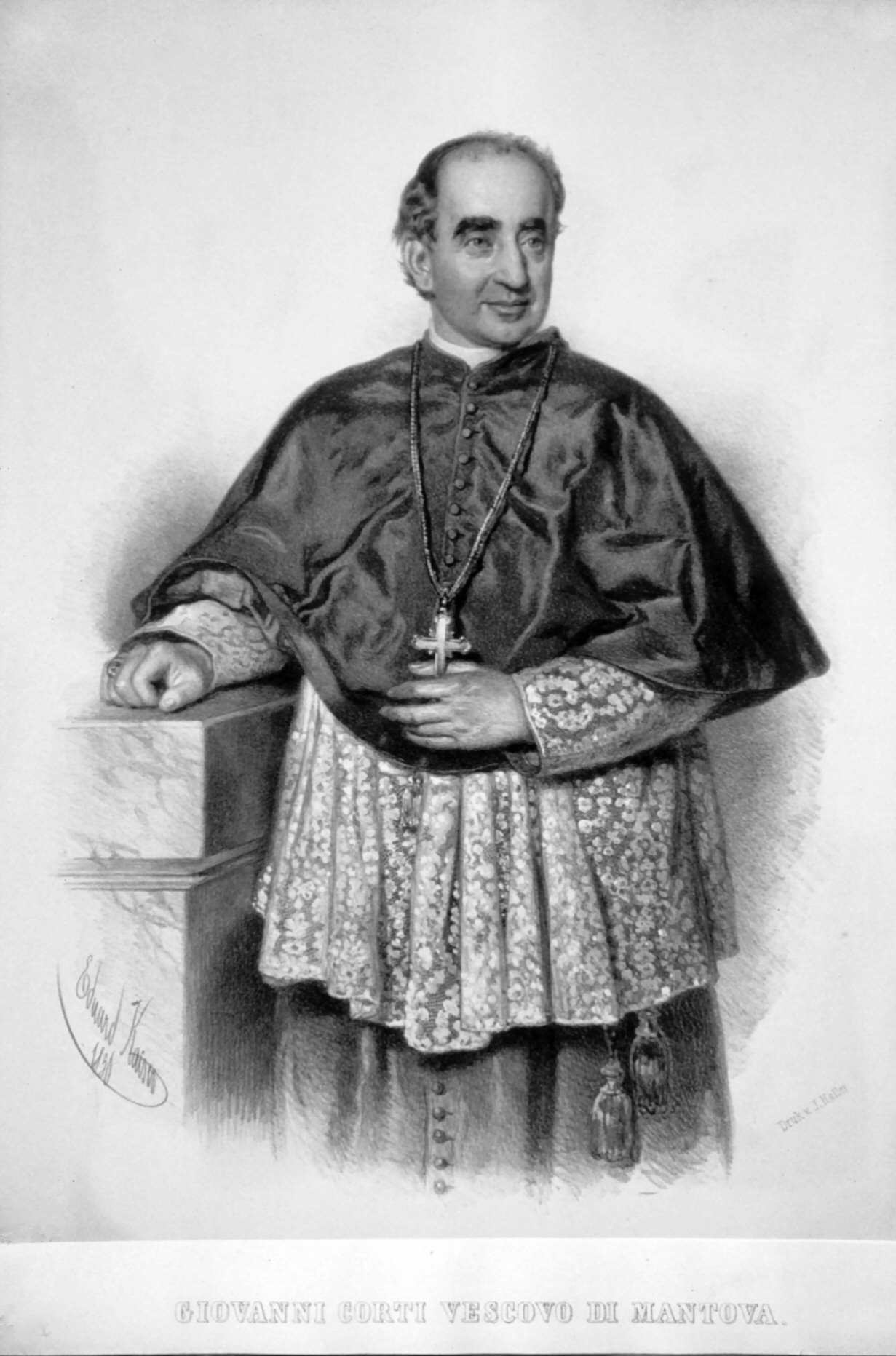
- Church: Roman Catholic
- Predecessor: Giovanni Battista Bellé
- Successor: Pietro Rota

Orders
- Ordination: 1820
- Consecration: by Cardinal Lodovico Altieri

Personal details
- Born: 14 April 1797 Pomerio, Como, Austrian Italy
- Died: 12 December 1868 (aged 71) Mantua, Italy
- Denomination: Roman Catholic
- Residence: Mantua, Italy

Giovanni Corti (14 April 1797 - 12 December 1868) was an Italian priest who became Bishop of Mantua. He supported the cause of Italian reunification at a time when his diocese was under Austrian rule, although he defended the temporal powers of the Pope.

== Early years ==
Giovanni Corti was born on 14 April 1796 in Pomerio, Como. He was ordained a priest around 1820. In 1838 the old parish of Agliate was divided into two, one based on Besana in Brianza and the other on Carate Brianza. The new parish of Besana was formally inaugurated on 25 April 1838, and Corte was made provost.

Corti twice declined a nomination as bishop before finally accepting in 1846. On 7 October 1846 he was selected Bishop of Mantova, Italy. He was confirmed in this position on 12 April 1847 and ordained on 25 April 1847. He handed over his parish to don G. Battista Mojana. He was consecrated by Cardinal Altieri on 19 January 1850.

== Bishop ==
Corti was a popular bishop, and when he endorsed union with Italy this helped to win supporters to the cause in Mantua. When the priest Enrico Tazzoli was condemned by the Austrians in 1852 for raising money for Giuseppe Mazzini's unification movement, Corti was asked to defrock Tazzoli. Corti resisted, but eventually was ordered to obey by Pope Pius IX, and reluctantly complied. Tazzoli was executed on 7 December 1852. Other priests of Mantua who were executed around this time were Giovanni Grioli (5 November 1851) and Bartolomeo Grazioli (3 March 1853). In 1853 Corti offered his resignation to the Pope, but was rejected.

During the revolutionary upheavals of 1848 Saint Andrews church in Mantua was occupied by Austrian troops. They removed the reliquary of the holy blood, and destroyed the relic (Note: It was thought that the relic was the blood of Jesus, preserved by his disciples.) itself. Fortunately part of the relic had been detached by the princely family of Gonzaga and held in their chapel, and with this the traditional rites continued at Saint Andrews. In 1856 Corti asked the Emperor Franz Joseph to repair the sacrilege to the extent possible. The emperor had two gold reliquaries made based on the design of the missing reliquary, which was the work of Benvenuto Cellini. The transfer was eventually made with great ceremony on Ascension day, 1876.

During the Second Italian War of Independence of 1859, in which France supported Kingdom of Sardinia, the Austrians retained control of the east of the province including the city of Mantua. Corti now had to show great prudence in leading the diocese, which was divided between Italy and Austria. In 1863 Corti wrote to the Pope, expressing all his bitterness for the opposition he faced because of his defense of the Pope's temporal powers. However, Corti sang a Te Deum for the unification of Italy, and said he hoped the Pope would voluntarily give up his temporal power. After being repeatedly asked to retract, he finally did so, but only as an act of pure obedience. Mantua finally became part of the kingdom of Italy after the Third Italian War of Independence in 1866. On 5 November 1866 Corte was made a senator of the Kingdom by King Victor Emanuel II.

Giovanni Corti died in Mantua on 12 December 1868. He was buried in the Cathedral. After a three-year gap he was succeeded by Pietro Rota, who tried to restore the diocese to orthodoxy, and was therefore not allowed by the civil authorities to take his seat.

== Bibliography ==
- Corti, Giovanni (1867). Ai dilettissimi miei diocesani.
- Corti, Giovanni (1868). Lettera pastorale al venerabile clero ed al dilettissimo popolo della città e diocesi di Mantova per la Quaresima del 1868. Tip. Eredi Segna.
- Vanoni, Vincenzo; Corti, Giovanni (1869). Risposta ... ad un libello infamatorio pubblicato in Milano sotto il titolo Una Lotta clericale sostenuta e narrata dal Conte G. Custoza ... contro Monsignor G. Corti Vescovo di Mantova.
- Corti, Giovanni (1869). Sugli insegnamenti degli Evangelici.
- Corti, Giovanni (1891). Filosofia della religione. Tipografia Vaticana.

== See also ==
- Catholic Church in Italy
