= Diocese of Mantua =

Roman Catholic diocese in Italy

Coordinates: 45.1667°N 10.8000°E

Diocese of Mantua Dioecesis Mantuana

Catholic
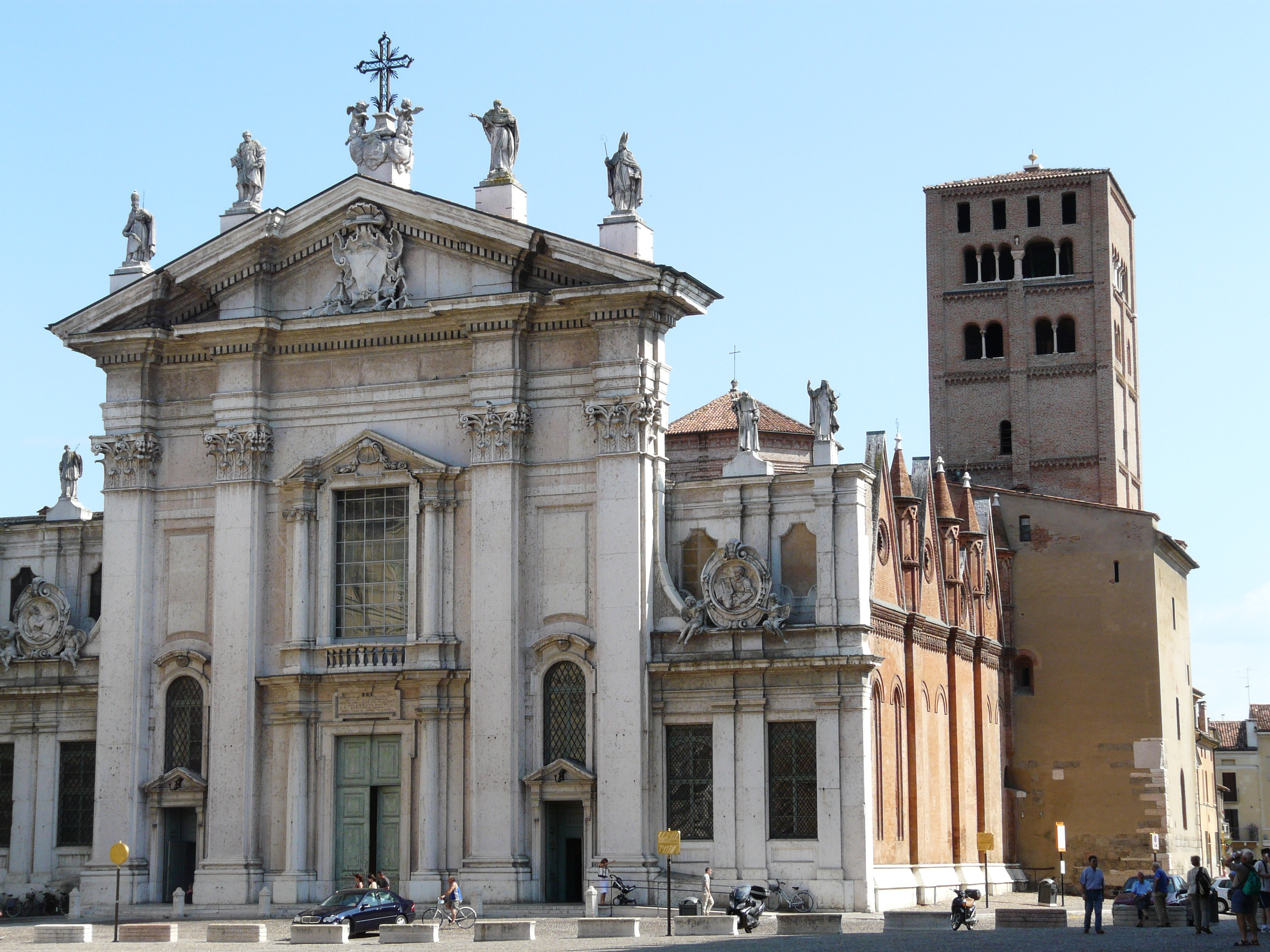
- Mantua Cathedral

Location
- Country: Italy
- Ecclesiastical province: Milan

Statistics
- Area: 2,080 km^{2} (800 sq mi)
- Population: Total; Catholics: (as of 2019); 376,405; 322,782 (85.8%)

Information
- Denomination: Catholic Church
- Sui iuris church: Latin Church
- Rite: Roman Rite
- Established: c. 804
- Cathedral: Cattedrale di San Pietro Apostolo
- Co-cathedral: Basilica di Sant'Andrea Apostolo
- Secular priests: 160 (diocesan); 22 (Religious Orders); 20 Permanent Deacons

Current leadership
- Pope: Leo XIV
- Bishop: Gianmarco Busca
- Bishops emeritus: Roberto Busti

Map

Website
- www.diocesidimantova.it

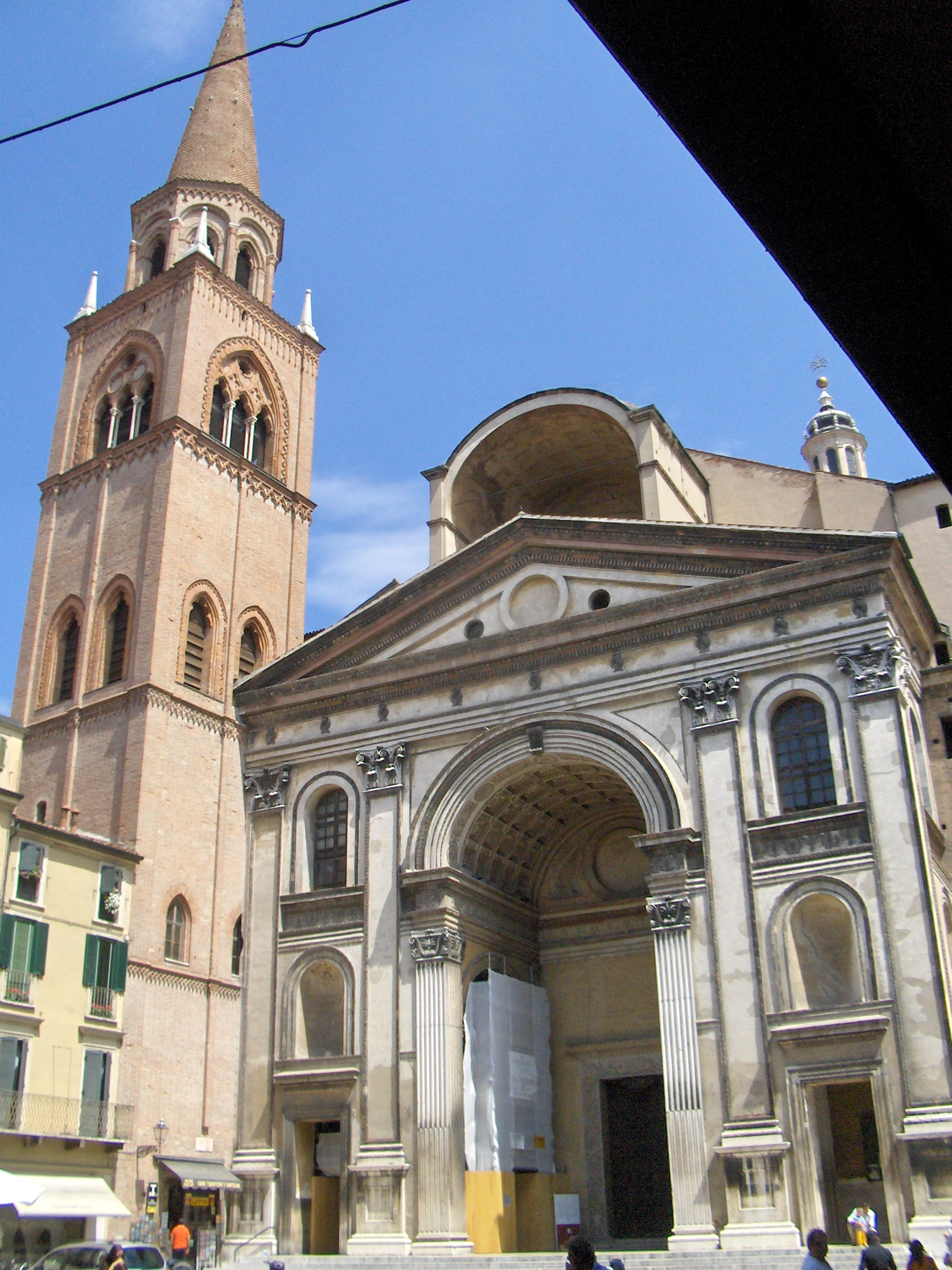
Basilica di S. Andrea Apostolo (Co-cathedral)

The Diocese of Mantua (Latin: Dioecesis Mantuana) is a Latin Church ecclesiastical territory or diocese of the Catholic Church in Italy. The diocese existed at the beginning of the 8th century, though the earliest attested bishop is Laiulfus (827). It has been a suffragan of the Archdiocese of Milan since 1819.

The cathedra of its bishop is in the Cathedral of S. Pietro Apostolo. Mantua also contains the Basilica di Sant'Andrea di Mantova. The current Bishop of Mantua is Gianmarco Busca, appointed by Pope Francis on June 3, 2016. The bishop emeritus is Roberto Busti. In 2013, there was one priest in the diocese for every 1,660 Catholics; in 2016, there was one priest for every 1,763 Catholics. The Diocese of Mantua is a suffragan diocese in the ecclesiastical province of the metropolitan Archdiocese of Milan.

== Bishops of Mantova ==
=== to 1200 ===
...

- Laiulfus (attested 827)

...

- Egilulf (attested 881)

...

- Manasses (935–937)
- Petrus (attested 937–945)

...

- Wilielmus (attested 962–964)
- Gumpoldus (attested 966–981)

...

- Joannes (attested 997)
- Hiltolfus (attested 1007–1040)
- Martianus (attested 1045–1052)
- Helisaeus (attested 1055–1064)

...

- Ubaldus (attested 1086–1098)

[Cono (Chono) (attested 1093–1112)] Imperialist. Intrusus

- Hugo (attested 1101–1113)

=== 1200 to 1511 ===
- Errico (1192–1229)
- Pellizzario (1229–1230)
- Guidotto da Correggio (1231–1235)
- Giacomo da Castell'Arquato (1237–1251)
- Martin de Puzalerio (1252–1268)
- Philippus de Casaloldo (1270–1303) Bishop elect
- Philippus dei Bonacolsi (1303)
- Giacomo Benfatti, O.P. (1304–1332)
- Gotifredus (1338–1347)
- Ruffinus de Landa (1347–1367)
- Guido da Arezzo (1367–1385)
- Scaramuzzo Gonzaga (1386–1390)
- Antonio Uberti (1390–1417)
- Giovanni degli Uberti (1418–1428)
- Matteo Boniperti, O.P. (1428–1444)
- Galeazzo Cavriani (1444–1466)
- Francesco Gonzaga (1466–1483)
- Ludovico Gonzaga (1483–1511)

=== 1511 to 1807 ===
Cardinal Sigismondo Gonzaga (10 February 1511–10 May 1521 Resigned) Administrator

- Ercole Gonzaga (10 May 1521 – 2 March 1563)
- Federico Gonzaga 4 June 1563 21 February 1565
- Francesco Gonzaga 15 May 1565 6 January 1566
- Gregorio Boldrini, O.P. 7 February 1567 2 November 1574
- Marco Fedele Gonzaga 28 November 1574 8 September 1583
- Alessandro Andreasi 14 November 1583 23 March 1593
- Francesco Gonzaga, O.F.M. ( 30 April 1593 2 March 1620)
- Vincenzo Agnello Suardi (2 March 1620–September 1644)
- Maffeo Vitale, O.F.M. (5 February 1646 – 23 June 1669)
- Ferdinando Tiberius Gonzaga (23 February 1671 – 1673)
- Joannes Lucidus Cataneo (12 March 1674–February 1685)
- Enrico Vialardi, B. (3 March 1687 – 6 December 1711)
- Alessandro Arrigoni (bishop) (30 January 1713 – 13 August 1718)
- Antonio Guidi di Bagno (26 April 1719 – 21 December 1761) (it)
- Juan Portugal de la Puebla (29 March 1762 – 17 January 1770 ||Resigned)
- Giovanni Battista de Pergen (29 January 1770 – 12 November 1807)

=== since 1800 ===
- Giuseppe Maria Bozzi (16 May 1823 – 14 December 1833)
- Giovanni Battista Bellé (24 July 1835 – 30 June 1844)
- Giovanni Corti (12 April 1847 – 12 December 1868)
- Pietro Rota (27 October 1871 – 3 May 1879 Retired)
- Giovanni Maria Berengo (12 May 1879 – 1884)
- Giuseppe Melchiorre Sarto (10 November 1884 – 1893)
- Paolo Carlo Francesco Origo (18 March 1895 – 13 November 1928)
- Domenico Menna (16 November 1928 – 8 September 1954 Retired)
- Antonio Poma (8 September 1954 – 1967)
- Carlo Ferrari (19 October 1967 – 28 June 1986 Retired)
- Egidio Caporello (28 June 1986 – 13 July 2007 Retired)
- Roberto Busti (13 July 2007 – 3 June 2016 Retired)
- Gianmarco Busca (3 June 2016– )

== Parishes ==
There are 168 parishes in the diocese of Mantua, all in the Lombardy region; 166 are in the Province of Mantua and 2 in the Province of Cremona.

== Books ==
- Eubel, Conradus, ed. (1913). Hierarchia catholica, Tomus 1 (second ed.). Münster: Libreria Regensbergiana. (in Latin)
- Eubel, Conradus, ed. (1914). Hierarchia catholica, Tomus 2 (second ed.). Münster: Libreria Regensbergiana.
- Gulik, Guilelmus (1923). Eubel, Conradus (ed.). Hierarchia catholica, Tomus 3 (second ed.). Münster: Libreria Regensbergiana.
- Gams, Pius Bonifatius (1873). Series episcoporum Ecclesiae catholicae: quotquot innotuerunt a beato Petro apostolo (in Latin). Ratisbon: Typis et Sumptibus Georgii Josephi Manz.
- Gauchat, Patritius (Patrice) (1935). Hierarchia catholica IV (1592-1667). Münster: Libraria Regensbergiana.
- Ritzler, Remigius; Sefrin, Pirminus (1952). Hierarchia catholica medii et recentis aevi V (1667-1730). Patavii: Messagero di S. Antonio.
- Ritzler, Remigius; Sefrin, Pirminus (1958). Hierarchia catholica medii et recentis aevi VI (1730-1799). Patavii: Messagero di S. Antonio.

=== Studies ===
- Bougard, François (2007). "Manasse". Dizionario Biografico degli Italiani (in Italian). Vol. 68: Malatacca–Mangelli. Rome: Istituto dell'Enciclopedia Italiana. ISBN 978-88-12-00032-6.
- Cappelletti, Giuseppe (1857). Le chiese d'Italia: dalla loro origine sino ai nostri giorni (in Italian). Vol. XII. Venezia: G. Antonelli. pp. 7–123.
- Kehr, Paul Fridolin (1923). Italia Pontificia Vol. VII:l Venetiae et Histria, Pars I: Provincia Aquileiensis. Berlin: Weidmann, pp. 305–354. (in Latin).
- Pezza-Rossa, Giuseppe (1847). Storia cronolica dei vescovi mantovani (in Italian). Mantua: Fratelli Negretti.
- Schwartz, Gerhard (1907). Die Besetzung der Bistümer Reichsitaliens unter den sächsischen und salischen Kaisern: mit den Listen der Bischöfe, 951-1122. Leipzig: B.G. Teubner. pp. 53–56. (in German)
