= Giuseppe Maria Bozzi =

Italian priest who became Bishop of Mantua

Monsignor Giuseppe Maria Bozzi
- Bishop of Mantua
- Church: Roman Catholic
- Installed: 16 June 1823
- Predecessor: Giovanni Battista de Pergen
- Successor: Giovanni Battista Bellé

Orders
- Ordination: 10 January 1796
- Consecration: by Cardinal Francesco Saverio Maria Felice Castiglioni

Personal details
- Born: 7 January 1772 Rosate, Milan
- Died: 14 December 1833 (aged 61)
- Denomination: Roman Catholic
- Residence: Mantua, Italy

Giuseppe Maria Bozzi (6 January 1772 - 14 December 1833) was an Italian priest who became Bishop of Mantua, based in the city of Mantua, Italy.

== Biography ==
=== Early years ===
Giuseppe Maria Bozzi was born in Rosate, Milan on 7 January 1772. His father, Giovanni Antonio, had a farm at Rosate, and in 1767 had married Maddalena Belloni, from the nearby town of Casorate. He entered the seminary in Milan, and by the age of 23 was a deacon and had earned a degree in Moral Theology at the University of Pavia. He exercised his ministry in the Milanese monastery of St. Eustorgius, in the college of the oblates of Rho, and as provost in the parish church of his native Rosata.

Bozzi was ordained a priest on 10 January 1796. In 1802 he was appointed parish priest of the church of S. Maria Nuova of Abbiategrasso. He remained in this village until 1816, when he was appointed provost of Casorate Primo.

=== Bishop ===
Bozzi was appointed Bishop of Mantova on 16 June 1823, at the age of fifty. The position had been vacant for fifteen years. At the time, Mantua was part of the Austro-Hungarian Empire. The Emperor Francis I of Austria chose Bozzi and he was consecrated by the future Pope Pius VIII. Bozzi was "preceded by a great reputation for spiritual qualities and for doctrine", as stated in a report of the time. He undertook a pastoral visit of his diocese. He transferred the Bishop's residence to the Palazzo Bianchi and transformed the old Bishop's Palace into a seminary.

In 1828 Bozzi became ill, and by the next year was no longer able to govern the diocese. He died on 14 December 1833 without having recovered. He was buried in the choir of the cathedral church.

== See also ==
- Catholic Church in Italy
