= Gianmarco Busca =

Italian bishop

His Excellency, The Most Reverend Gianmarco Busca
- Diocese: Mantua
- Appointed: 3 June 2016
- Installed: 3 June 2016
- Predecessor: Roberto Busti

Orders
- Ordination: 8 June 1991 by Bruno Foresti
- Consecration: 11 September 2016 by Luciano Monari
- Rank: bishop

Personal details
- Born: 30 November 1965 (age 60) Edolo
- Denomination: Roman Catholic
- Motto: Latin: Quærite primum regnum Dei

Styles of Gianmarco Busca
- Reference style: The Most Reverend
- Spoken style: Your Excellency
- Religious style: Monsignor

Gianmarco Busca (born 30 November 1965 in Edolo) is the bishop of the Roman Catholic Diocese of Mantua, Italy.

He was ordinated priest on June 8, 1991 and was incardinated in the Roman Catholic Diocese of Brescia. From 1994 to 1999 he was studying theology in Pontifical Gregorian University in Rome. He was appointed a bishop of Mantua on June 3, 2016 by Pope Francis. He received his episcopal consecration on September 11, 2016 and was installed in the diocese on October 2, 2016.

== Sources ==
- Profile of Mons. Busca on catholic-hierarchy
- Profile of Mons. Busca on Gcatholic
