= Egidio Caporello =

Italian Catholic prelate (1931–2022)

His Excellency Egidio Caporello
- Bishop of Mantua
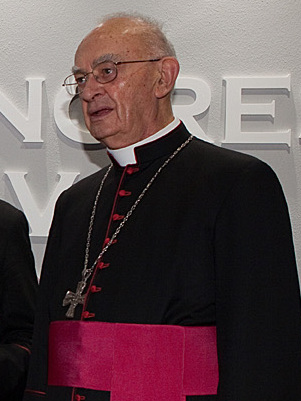
- Caporello in 2011
- Church: Catholic
- Diocese: Mantua
- Appointed: 28 June 1986
- Term ended: 13 July 2007
- Predecessor: Carlo Ferrari
- Successor: Roberto Busti
- Previous posts: Titular Bishop of Caprulae (1982–1986); Bishop Emeritus of Mantua (2007–2022)

Orders
- Ordination: 10 July 1955 by Girolamo Bartolomeo Bortignon
- Consecration: 19 September 1982 by Anastasio Alberto Ballestrero

Personal details
- Born: 8 June 1931 Padua, Italy
- Died: 18 July 2022 (aged 91) Mantua, Italy

Egidio Caporello (8 June 1931 – 18 July 2022) was an Italian prelate of the Catholic Church.

Caporello was ordained to the priesthood in 1955. He served in the Roman Curia from 1982 to 1986 and was ordained titular bishop of Caprulae. Caporello then served as bishop of Diocese of Mantua, Italy, from 1986 until his retirement in 2007.

Catholic Church titles
Preceded by Carlo Ferrari	Bishop of Mantua; 1986–2007	Succeeded by Roberto Busti
Preceded by John Francis Kinney	Titular Bishop of Caprulae; 1982–1986	Succeeded by Gilberto Agustoni
