= Alessandro Arrigoni (bishop) =

Most Reverend Alessandro Arrigoni
- Bishop of Mantua
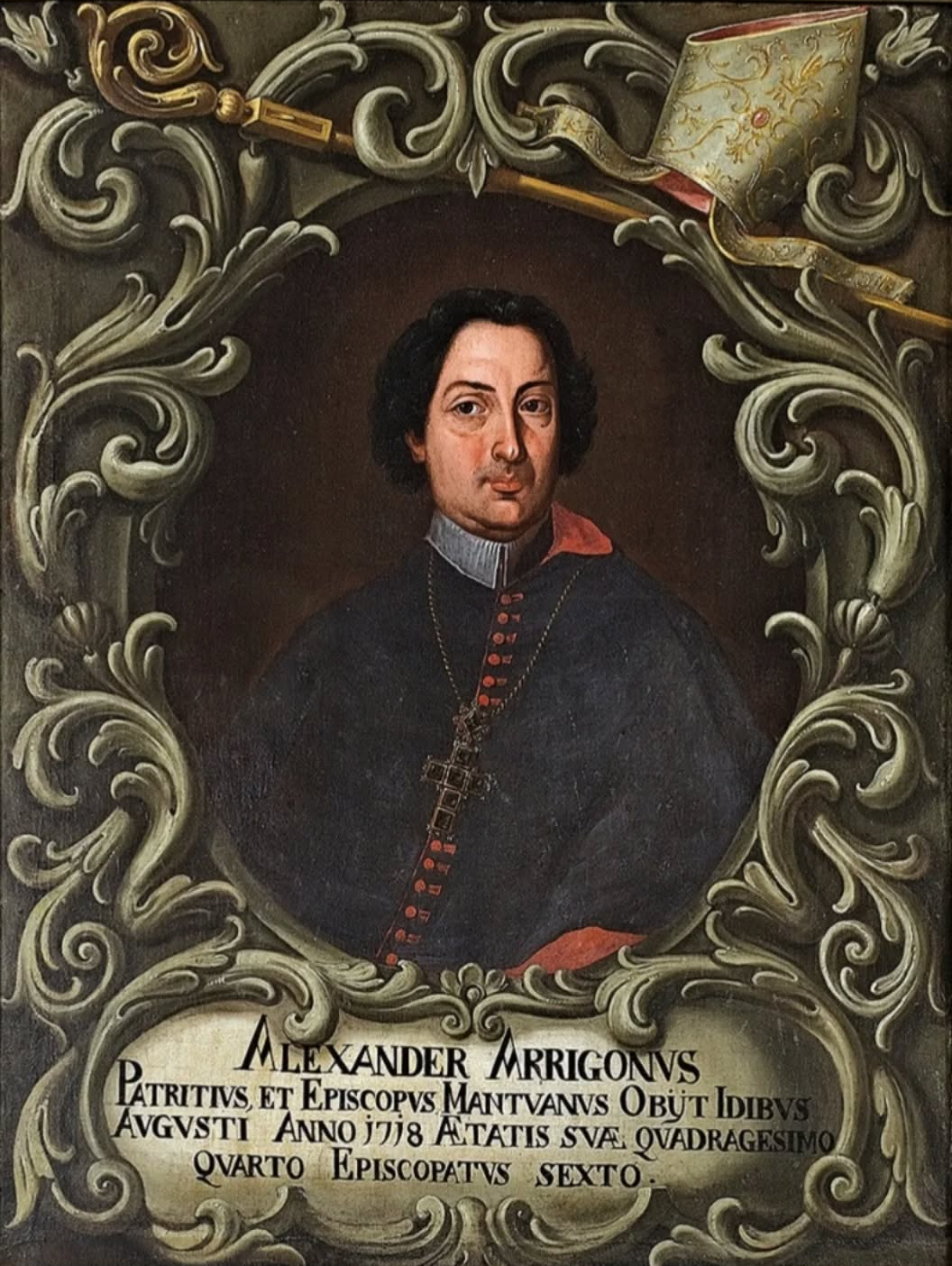
- Church: Catholic Church
- Diocese: Diocese of Mantua
- In office: 1713–1718
- Predecessor: Enrico Vialardi
- Successor: Antonio Guidi di Bagno

Orders
- Consecration: 5 February 1713 by Ferdinando d'Adda

Personal details
- Born: 24 August 1674 Mantua, Italy
- Died: 13 August 1718 (aged 43) Mantua, Italy

Alessandro Arrigoni (died 1674) was a Roman Catholic prelate who served as Bishop of Mantua (1713–1718).

== Biography ==
Alessandro Arrigoni was born in Mantua, Italy on 24 August 1674. On 30 January 1713, he was appointed during the papacy of Pope Clement XI as Bishop of Mantua. On 5 February 1713, he was consecrated bishop by Ferdinando d'Adda, Cardinal-Priest of Santa Balbina, with Vincenzo Petra, Titular Archbishop of Damascus, and Antonio San Felice, Bishop of Nardò, serving as co-consecrators. He served as Bishop of Mantua until his death on 13 August 1718.

== External links and additional sources ==
- Cheney, David M. "Diocese of Mantova". Catholic-Hierarchy.org. (for Chronology of Bishops) ^{[self-published]}
- Chow, Gabriel. "Diocese of Mantova (Italy)". GCatholic.org. (for Chronology of Bishops) ^{[self-published]}

Catholic Church titles
Preceded by Enrico Vialardi	Bishop of Mantua; 1713–1718	Succeeded by Antonio Guidi di Bagno
