= Giovanni Battista Bellé =

Monsignor Giovanni Battista Bellé
- Bishop of Mantua
- Church: Roman Catholic
- Appointed: 20 February 1835
- Installed: 24 July 1835
- Term ended: 30 June 1844
- Predecessor: Giuseppe Maria Bozzi
- Successor: Giovanni Corti

Orders
- Ordination: 28 February 1801
- Consecration: 26 July 1835 by Cardinal Carlo Odescalchi

Personal details
- Born: 4 October 1776 Lodi, Lombardy, Austrian Italy
- Died: 30 June 1844 (aged 67)
- Denomination: Roman Catholic
- Residence: Mantua, Italy

Giovanni Battista Bellé (4 October 1776 - 30 June 1844) was an Italian priest who became Bishop of Mantua, based in the city of Mantua, Italy.

Bellé was born in Lodi, Lombardy, on 4 October 1776. He was ordained a priest on 28 February 1801. At the time of his appointment he was dean of the parish of Lodi Cathedral. He was selected as Bishop of Mantova on 20 February 1835, confirmed as bishop on 24 July 1835, and ordained two days later.

Bellé undertook a detailed pastoral visit of his diocese. He paid particular attention to the seminary, and restored its original buildings for use as a minor seminary. He died on 30 June 1844.
