= Matteo Lovatti the younger =

Italian painter

Matteo Lovatti the younger (1861–1927) was an Italian painter, mainly of genre subjects.

== Biography ==
He was born in Rome His grandfather with the same name (1770–1849) was an architect who worked for the Papal authorities during the early 19th century. His father Filippo Lovatti was a lawyer and he died in 1893. Matteo was influenced by the circle of realist genre painters around Mariano Fortuny in Rome. He exhibited in 1880 at Turin: Il 14 marzo 1878 a Roma; the same year at Milan, Piccolo venditore di violette; in 1883 at Rome, Vita moderna; in 1884 at Turin, Una partita alle carte and Male Portrait. In 1909, he exhibited with the Watercolor Association in Rome: Il Vaticano and Villa de' Quintili.

== See also ==
- Matteo Lovatti the elder
