= Pietro Rota =

Monsignor Pietro Rota
- Bishop of Mantua
- Church: Roman Catholic
- Appointed: 27 October 1871
- Term ended: 3 May 1879
- Predecessor: Giovanni Corti
- Successor: Giovanni Maria Berengo

Orders
- Consecration: by Cardinal Costantino Patrizi Naro

Personal details
- Born: 30 January 1805 Correggio, Emilia-Romagna, Italian Republic
- Died: 3 February 1890 (aged 85) Rome
- Denomination: Roman Catholic
- Residence: Mantua, Italy

Pietro Rota (30 January 1805 – 3 February 1890) was an Italian priest who became Bishop of Mantua, based in the city of Mantua, Northern Italy. He was given the mandate of restoring the diocese to obedience to the Pope after succeeding a popular liberal bishop who had supported Italian unification and the surrender of the Pope's temporal powers. He was harassed by the civil authorities, and was not allowed to take his seat.

== Early years ==
Pietro Rota was born in Correggio, Emilia-Romagna, on 30 January 1805. He was appointed Bishop of Guastalla on 23 March 1855, and was ordained two days later. On 27 October 1871 he was appointed Bishop of Mantova.

== Bishop of Mantua ==
Rota succeeded Bishop Giovanni Corti in Mantua, a liberal who had strongly supported the unification of Italy and hoped that the Pope would voluntarily give up his temporal powers. Corti had died three years earlier, and it had been difficult to find a successor. Rota had the mandate of restoring the diocese to order and orthodoxy, and used strong language – so strong that the civil authorities jailed him for six days and imposed a fine. Pietro Rota was not granted the exequatur from the civil authorities, and therefore was not allowed to reside in the bishop's palace. The authorities closed the seminary in Mantua. Rota founded the periodical Il Vessillo Cattolico (The Catholic Banner), which was published from 1872 to 1876. He undertook a pastoral visit.

== Later years ==
Pietro Rota retired on 3 May 1879. On 12 May 1879 he was appointed titular Archbishop of Carthage, and on 4 November 1884 he was appointed titular Archbishop of Thebae. He died in Rome on 3 February 1890. His name was later submitted for consideration as a saint on the basis of heroic virtues. The informative process opened on 8 May 1943.
