= Sampietrini =

Italian cobblestone street pavement

Coordinates: 41°54′08″N 12°27′52″E

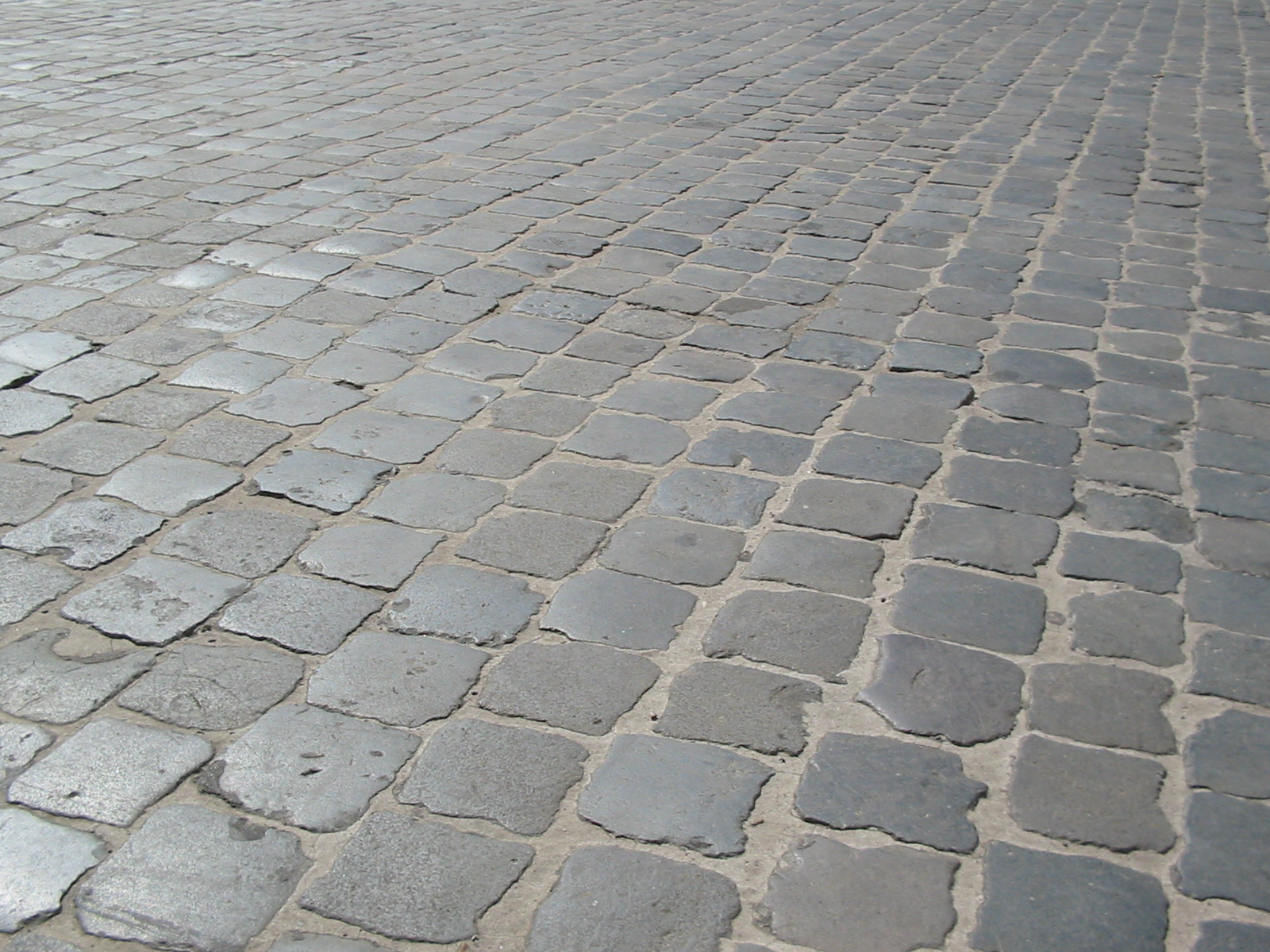
An example of sampietrini pavement

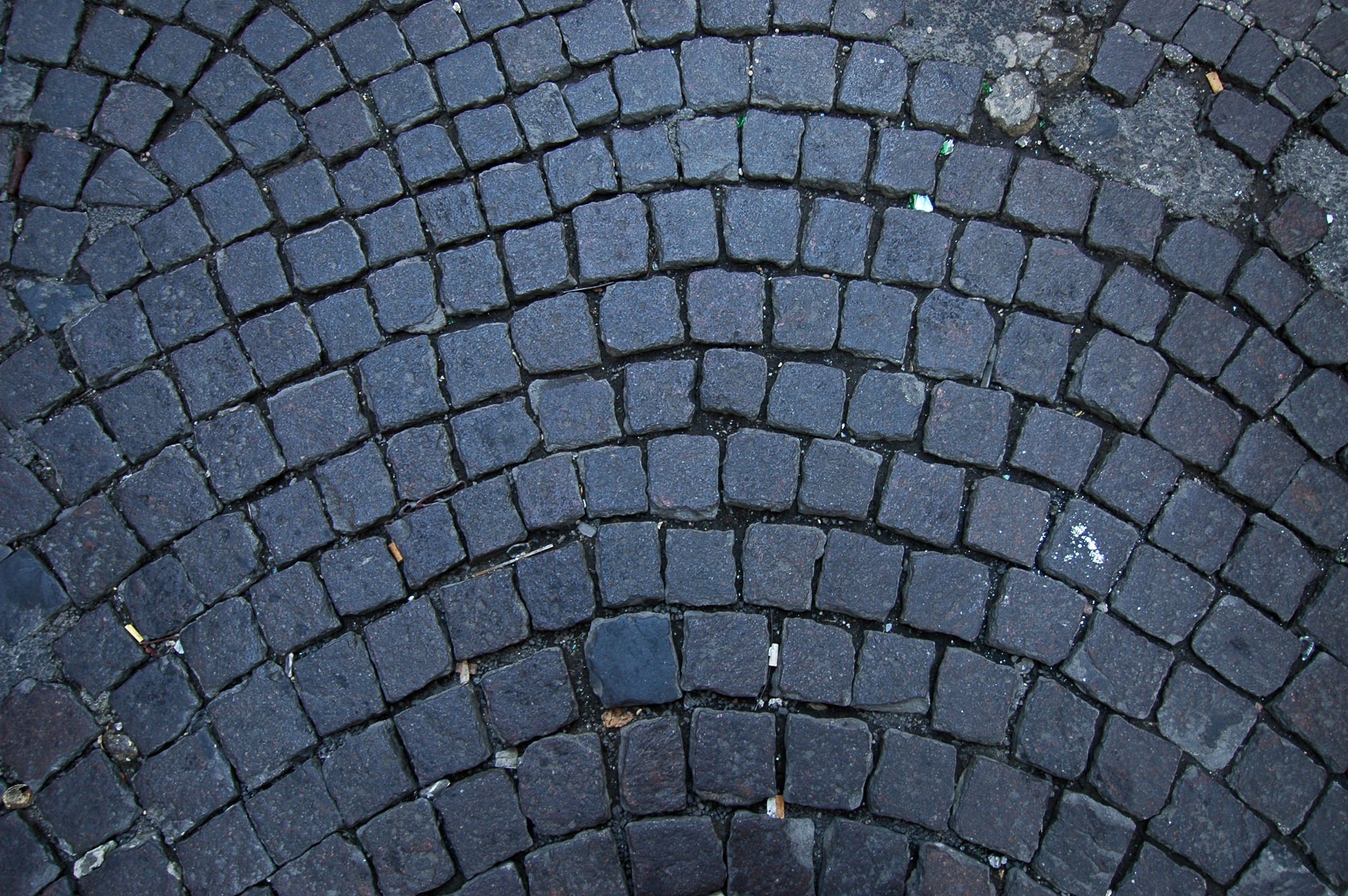
An examples of sampietrini pavement

Sampietrini (also sanpietrini) is the pavement found in the historic district of Rome and in St. Peter's Square, Vatican City. The earliest examples were made by trimming large blocks that had been used in ancient Roman roads, as recently discovered in fifteenth- and sixteenth-century archeological excavations. The first documented use in Rome of "sampietrini" stones was during the reign of Pope Pius V (1566–72). Over the next two centuries, the stones were used to pave all the main streets of Rome, because this mode was superior to brick, as it provided a smoother, stronger surface for carriages.

Advantages of sampietrini:

- It creates small channels between the bricks that allow water to pass.
- It can be adapted to the irregularities of the underlying ground.
- It is a long-lasting material.

Disadvantages of sampietrini:

- Over time, the underlying ground will become irregular.
- It is slippery when wet.

Sampietrini's peculiarities make it unsuitable to streets where traffic travels at high speed. Nowadays, its use is largely confined to historical or very narrow streets in the center of Rome (e.g., in Trastevere), where traffic is light and slow.

The widespread availability of sampietrini made it a weapon of choice in Italian riots since the 1960s.

In July 2005, the mayor of Rome, Walter Veltroni, declared that the sampietrini pavement was causing problems: its irregularity could be dangerous to moped riders and other two-wheeled vehicles; heavy vehicles passing over it created noise and vibrations damaging to adjacent buildings. While these concerns were countered with the argument that inadequate maintenance was at fault, Veltroni said that the sampietrini would be removed, reserving them solely for pedestrian streets.

== Sources ==
- Cibin, Ludovica, "Selciato Romano; il sampietrino" (Rome: Gangemi) 2005.
- Sampietrini: una grana per Veltroni, il Giornale (in Italian)
- Roma dice addio ai sampietrini asfalto anche nelle vie del centro, la Repubblica (in Italian)
- Rinne, Katherine, "The Waters of Rome: Aqueducts, Fountains, and the Birth of the Baroque City," chapter 9 (New Haven: Yale) 2010.
