= Paride Suzzara Verdi =

- Born: 1 April 1826; San Giorgio di Mantova
- Died: 7 August 1879 (aged 53); Mantua
- Occupations: Patriot, journalist, politician

Paride Suzzara Verdi (1 April 1826 – 7 August 1879) was an Italian patriot, journalist and politician.

== Early years ==
Paride Suzzara Verdi was born in San Giorgio di Mantova in the Province of Mantua on 1 April 1826 to a wealthy and patriotic family. His parents were Carlo Suzzara Verdi, a landowner, and Matilde Dall'Acqua. He participated in the revolutions of 1848 with his brothers Annibale (born 1827), Teodoro (born 1828) e Tullio (born 1829). He was identified by the police as being close to the revolutionary movement of 1848. After the Austrians returned he first moved to Borgoforte and then to Pavia. In 1851 he graduated from University of Pavia with a degree in law.

Suzzara Verdi was among the twenty people who met on 2 November 1850 to create the revolutionary committee of Mantua. (Note: According to the priest Enrico Tazzoli, testifying in 1852, those present were Enrico Tazzoli, Engineer Attilio Mori, Carlo Marchi, Luigi Castellazzo, Doctor Giovanni Acerbi, Paride Suzzara Verdi, Giuseppe Borella, Alessandro Vettori, Deacon Giuseppe Pezzarossa, Engineer Giuseppe Borchetta, Engineer Giovanni Chiassi, Doctor Vincenzo Giacometti, Doctor Carlo Poma, Doctor Giuseppe Quintavalle, Francesco Siliprandi, Omero Zanucchi and Tassoni Dario. The others were Aristide Ferrari, Giovanni Rossetti and Achille Sacchi.) Following the subsequent Austrian repression, some of these would be executed, and were among the Belfiore martyrs. Suzzara Verdi suffered imprisonment for a month. However, he was not investigated for participating in the conspiracy.

== Journalist ==
Having survived the trials and hangings, in 1855 Suzzara Verdi returned to Mantua. He began to write in the local liberal-democratic journal La Lucciola (The Firefly), and became its editor before it was closed. In 1856 he began teaching. When the Second Italian War of Independence began in 1859 he was expelled from Mantua and forced into exile in Piedmont and Lombardy. In 1860 he participated in the Expedition of the Thousand in which forces led by Giuseppe Garibaldi overcame the Kingdom of the Two Sicilies, which was annexed to Italy. He contributed to the journals Eco della borsa and Il Pungolo (The Sting), then worked as press secretary for the superintendency of Cremona. He also wrote using the pen name of "Sordello".

When Mantua became part of Italy in 1866, he returned and founded the political journal La Favilla (The Spark), which was published from 20 November 1866 to 17 August 1879. At first the journal followed a democratic line, then from 1871 to 1873 was internationalist, supporting the International Workingmen's Association (IWA - often called the First International). Suzzara Verdi, Lodovico Nabruzzi and Celso Ceretti were among the few internationalists who at first considered that Garibaldi's leadership was essential for a people's republic. In August 1872 Suzzara Verdi participated in the congress in Rimini in which the Italian section of the IWA, the Federazione Italia dell'Associazione Internazionale dei Lavoratori (FIAIL) was constituted. He was elected to the statistics commission. He offered to make La Favilla the official organ of the movement, and in December 1872 it was proclaimed the national organ of the IWA.

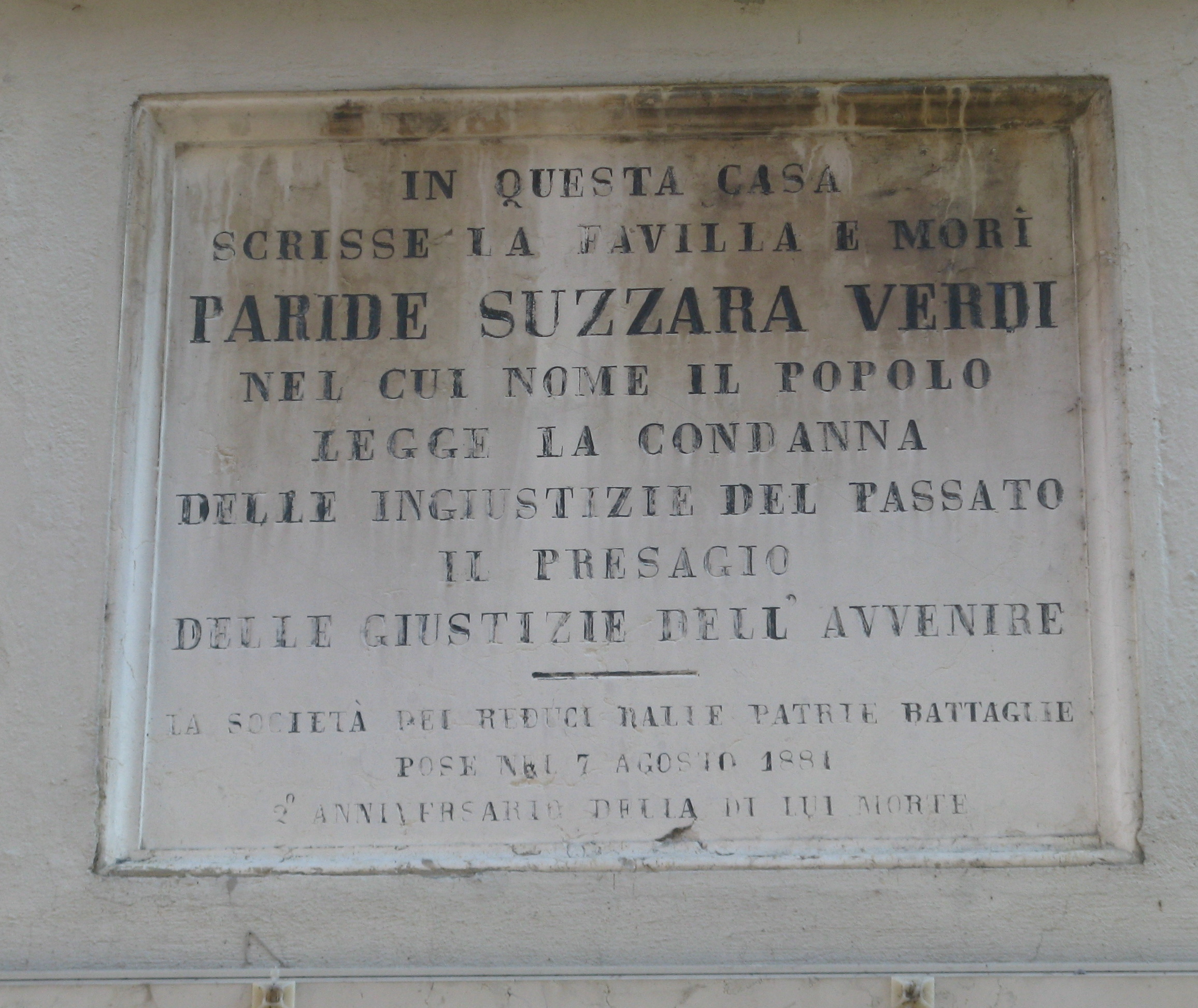
Commemorative plaque to Paride Suzzara Verdi on the wall of his house on the Via Orefici, Mantua

Suzzara Verdi's adherence to the IWA did not last, and he later joined the Democratic League of Padano-Veneta, supported by the republican Alberto Mario of the Province of Mantova. He was a proponent of organized labor, universal suffrage and radical democracy. He was an active Republican Socialist until his death. In October 1876 he was among the founders in Mantua of the Associazione Generale dei Lavoratori di Città e di Provincia (General Workers' Association of the City and Province).

Paride Suzzara Verdi died on 7 August 1879 in Mantua aged 53. A street in Mantua is named after him.

== Bibliography ==
- Patria e cuore (Home and heart). Milan: Boniotti diretto da F. Gareff. 1861.
- Appunti sulla istruzione pubblica (Notes on public education). Milano: Alessandro Lombardi. 1862.
- Poesie (Poems). Mantova: Mondovi. 1880.

== Sources ==
- Cipolla, Costantino (2006a). Belfiore: I. Comitati insurrezionali del Lombardo-Veneto ed il loro processo a Mantova del 1852-1853. FrancoAngeli. p. 176. ISBN 978-88-464-7733-0.
- Cipolla, Costantino (2006b). Belfiore: II. Costituti, documenti tradotti dal tedesco ed altri materiali inediti del processo ai comitati insurrezionali del Lombardo-Veneto (1852-1853). FrancoAngeli. p. 146. ISBN 978-88-464-7922-8.
- Castagnoli, Clara; Ciaramelli, Giancarlo (2002). Un secolo di stampa periodica mantovana: 1797-1897. FrancoAngeli. ISBN 978-88-464-3756-3.
- "La Lucciola". Regione Lombardia - Università degli Studi di Pavia.
- Ravindranathan, T. R. (October 1981). "The Paris Commune and the First International in Italy: Republicanism versus Socialism, 1871-1872". The International History Review. 3 (4). Taylor & Francis, Ltd.: 482–516. doi:10.1080/07075332.1981.9640259. JSTOR 40105174.
- "Suzzara Verdi Paride" (in Italian). ABMO.
- "Via Paride Suzzara Verdi".
