= Martyr =

Person who suffers persecution and death for their faith

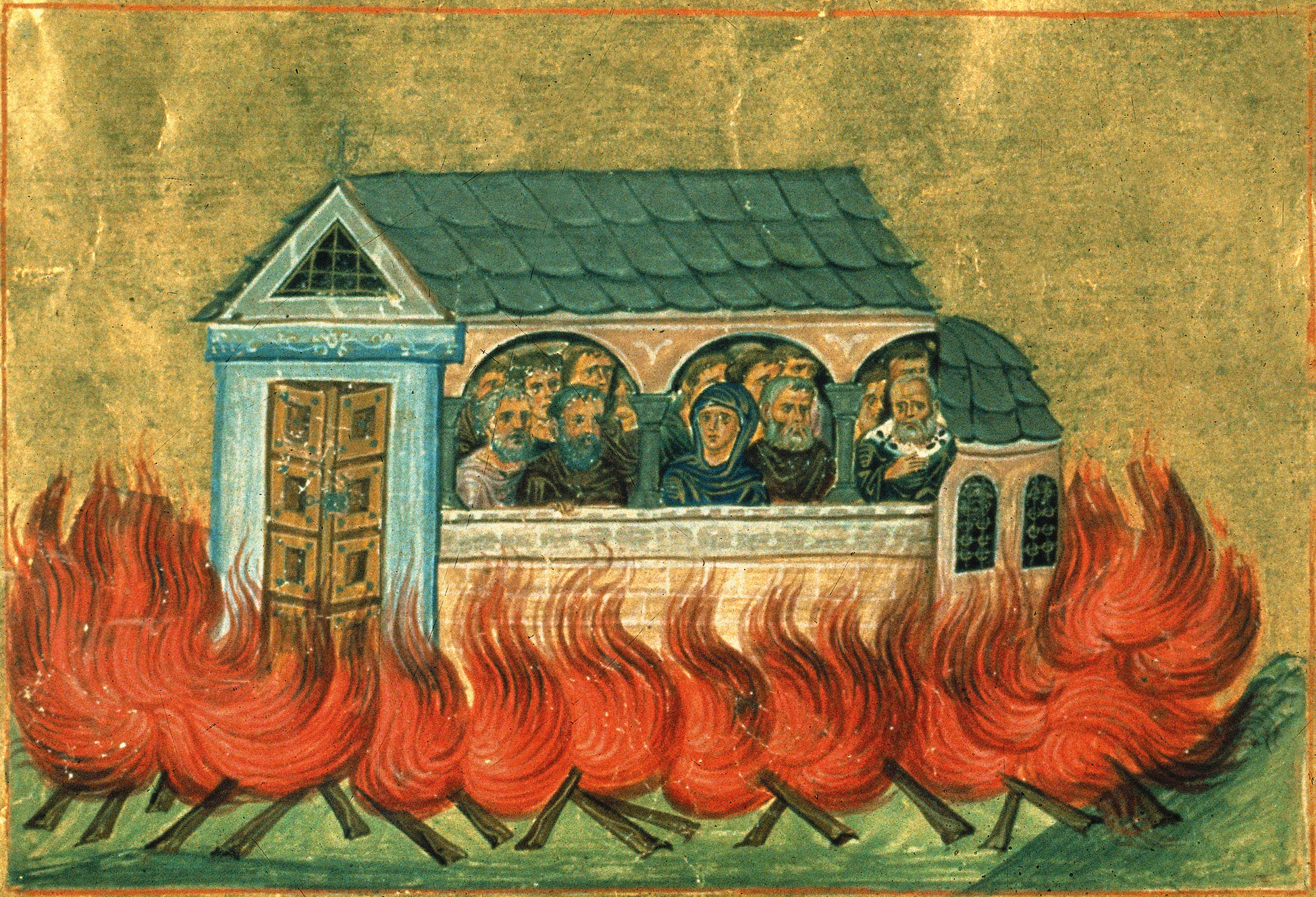
Miniature from the Menologion of Basil II depicting the 20,000 Martyrs of Nicomedia, who were martyred when Roman soldiers set their church on fire on Christmas Day, AD 302

A martyr (Greek: μάρτυς, mártys, 'witness' stem μαρτυρ-, martyr-) is someone who suffers persecution and death for advocating, renouncing, or refusing to renounce or advocate, a religious belief or other cause as demanded by an external party. In colloquial usage, the term can also refer to any person who suffers a significant consequence in protest or support of a cause.

In the martyrdom narrative of the remembering community, this refusal to comply with the presented demands results in the punishment or execution of an individual by an oppressor. Accordingly, the status of the 'martyr' can be considered a posthumous title as a reward for those who are considered worthy of the concept of martyrdom by the living, regardless of any attempts by the deceased to control how they will be remembered in advance. Insofar, the martyr is a relational figure of a society's boundary work that is produced by collective memory. Originally applied only to those who suffered for their religious beliefs, the term has come to be used in connection with people killed for a political cause.

Most martyrs are considered holy or are respected by their followers, becoming symbols of exceptional leadership and heroism in the face of difficult circumstances. Martyrs play significant roles in religions. Similarly, martyrs have had notable effects in secular life, including such figures as Socrates, among other political and cultural examples.

== Meaning ==
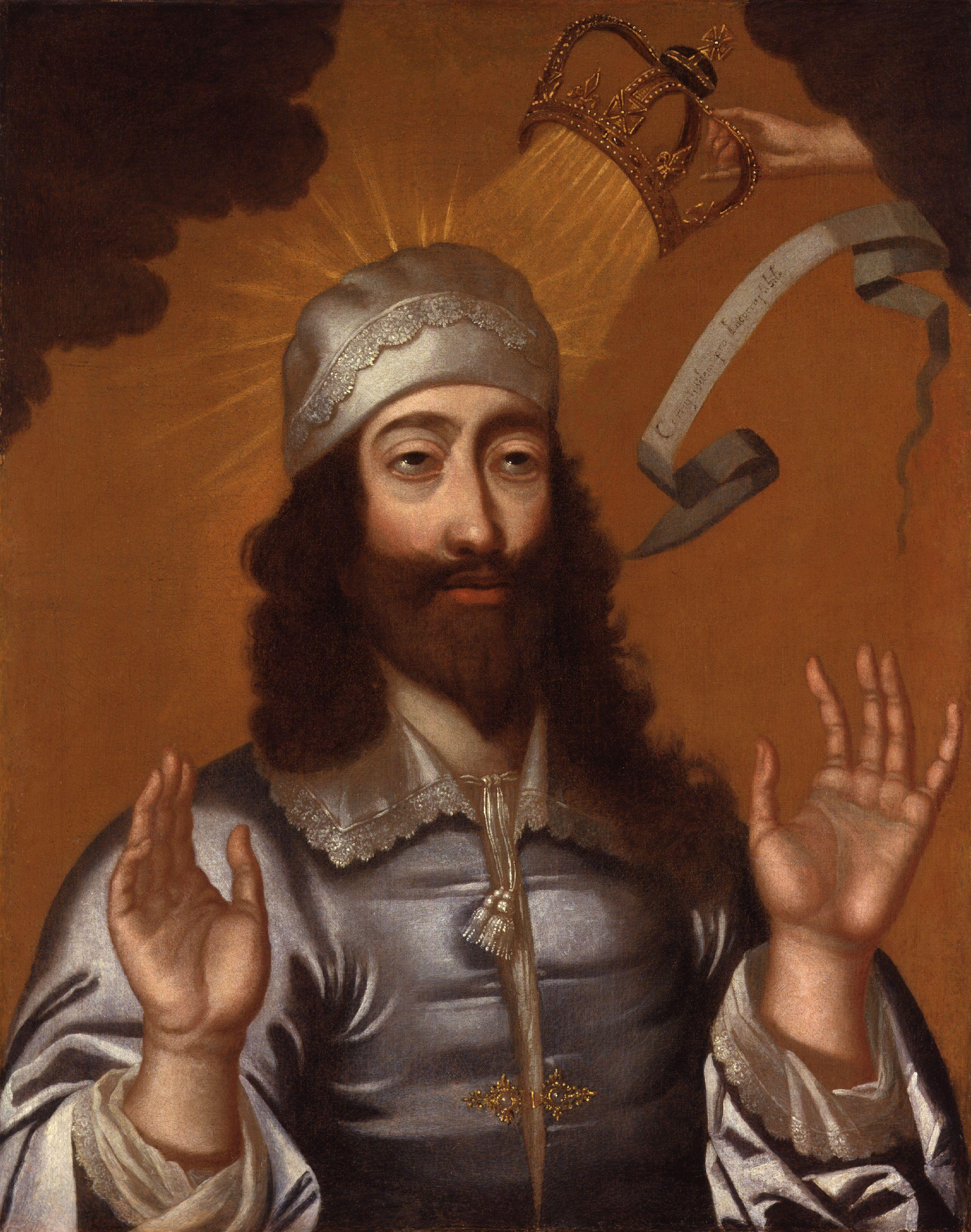
Charles I is regarded by many members of the Church of England as a martyr because, it is said, he was offered his life if he would abandon the historic episcopacy in the Church of England. It is said he refused, however, believing that the Church of England was truly "Catholic" and should maintain the Catholic episcopate.

In its original meaning, the word martyr, meaning witness, was used in the secular sphere as well as in the New Testament of the Bible. The process of bearing witness was not intended to lead to the death of the witness, although it is known from ancient writers (e.g., Josephus) and from the New Testament that witnesses often died for their testimonies.

During the early Christian centuries, the term acquired the extended meaning of believers who are called to witness for their religious belief, and on account of this witness, endure suffering or death. The term, in this later sense, entered the English language as a loanword. The death of a martyr or the value attributed to it is called martyrdom.

The early Christians who first began to use the term martyr in its new sense saw Jesus as the first and greatest martyr, on account of his crucifixion. The early Christians appear to have seen Jesus as the archetypal martyr.

The word martyr is used in English to describe a wide variety of people. However, the following table presents a general outline of common features present in stereotypical martyrdoms.

A female martyr may rarely be referred to as a martyress.

Common features of stereotypical martyrdoms
| 1. | A hero | A person of some renown who is devoted to a cause believed to be admirable. |
| 2. | Opposition | People who oppose that cause. |
| 3. | Foreseeable risk | The hero foresees action by opponents to harm them, because of their commitment to the cause. |
| 4. | Courage and commitment | The hero continues, despite knowing the risk, out of commitment to the cause. |
| 5. | Death | The opponents kill the hero because of their commitment to the cause. |
| 6. | Audience response | The hero's death is commemorated. People may label the hero explicitly as a martyr. Other people may in turn be inspired to pursue the same cause. |

== Martyrdom in the Middle East ==
In contemporary Middle Eastern cultures, the term for 'martyr' (Arabic shahid) has more uses than the English word 'martyr'.

While the term can be narrowly used for a person who is killed because of their religion, it is more generally used to mean a person who died a violent death. Thus it can arguably mean a general 'victim'.

A person is a martyr if they were killed because of their identity, because of natural disasters like earthquakes, or while performing relief or health care work. For example, İbrahim Bilgen was killed by Israel in the 2010 Gaza flotilla raid. Because he died as a humanitarian activist, he is called a martyr by Al-Jazeera.

Martyrdom is also tied with nationalism, because a martyr can be a person who died in the context of national struggle. For example, in Beirut, Martyrs' Square is a public square that's dedicated to Lebanese nationalists who were executed by the Ottomans.

In Palestine, the word 'martyr' is traditionally used to mean a person killed by Israeli forces, regardless of religion. For example, Shireen Abu Akleh was a Palestinian Christian journalist who was killed by Israeli forces, and Arabic media calls her a 'martyr'. This reflects a communal belief that every Palestinian death is part of a resistance against Israeli occupation. Children are likewise called martyrs, such as the children of journalist Wael Al-Dahdouh who were killed in an Israeli airstrike.

The label of martyrdom is used as a form of memoralizing the dead within some narrative, such as how the victims of the 2020 Beirut explosion were called 'martyrs of corruption' as a form of protest against the government.

The wide usage of 'martyr' is not restricted to Arabic. Armenian culture likewise uses the term for the victims of the Armenian genocide, who are called Holy Martyrs. April 24 is Armenian Genocide Memorial Day, and also called "Armenian Martyrs Day".

== Religious meanings ==
=== Eastern religions ===
==== Chinese culture ====
Martyrdom was extensively promoted by the Tongmenghui and the Kuomintang party in modern China. Revolutionaries who died fighting against the Qing dynasty in the Xinhai Revolution and throughout the Republic of China period, furthering the cause of the revolution, were recognized as martyrs.

==== Sikhism ====
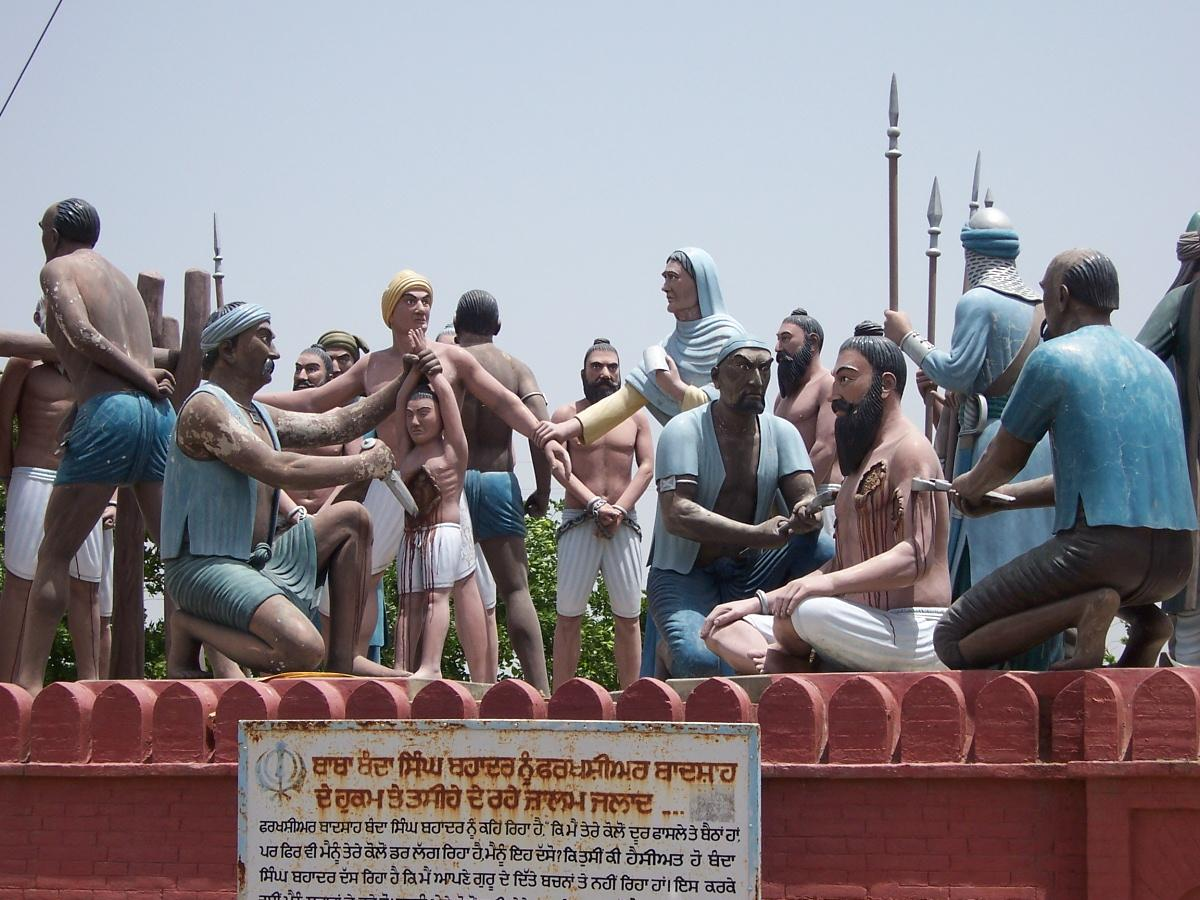
Sculpture at Mehdiana Sahib of the execution of Banda Singh Bahadur by Mughals in 1716

Martyrdom (called shahadat in Punjabi) is a fundamental concept in Sikhism and represents an important institution of the faith. Sikhs believe in Ibaadat se Shahadat (from love to martyrdom). Some famous Sikh martyrs include:

- Guru Arjan, the fifth leader of Sikhism. Guru ji was brutally tortured for almost 5 days before he attained shaheedi, or martyrdom.
- Guru Tegh Bahadur, the ninth guru of Sikhism, martyred on 11 November 1675. He is also known as Dharam Di Chadar (i.e. "the shield of Religion"), suggesting that to save Hinduism, the guru gave his life.
- Bhai Dayala is one of the Sikhs who was martyred at Chandni Chowk at Delhi in November 1675 due to his refusal to accept Islam.
- Bhai Mati Das is considered by some one of the greatest martyrs in Sikh history, martyred at Chandni Chowk at Delhi in November 1675 to save Hindu Brahmins.
- Bhai Sati Das is also considered by some one of the greatest martyrs in Sikh history, martyred along with Guru Teg Bahadur at Chandni Chowk at Delhi in November 1675 to save kashmiri pandits.
- Sahibzada Ajit Singh, Sahibzada Jujhar Singh, Sahibzada Zorawar Singh and Sahibzada Fateh Singh – the four sons of Guru Gobind Singh, the 10th Sikh guru.
- Bhai Mani Singh, who came from a family of over 20 different martyrs

=== Abrahamic religions ===
==== Judaism ====
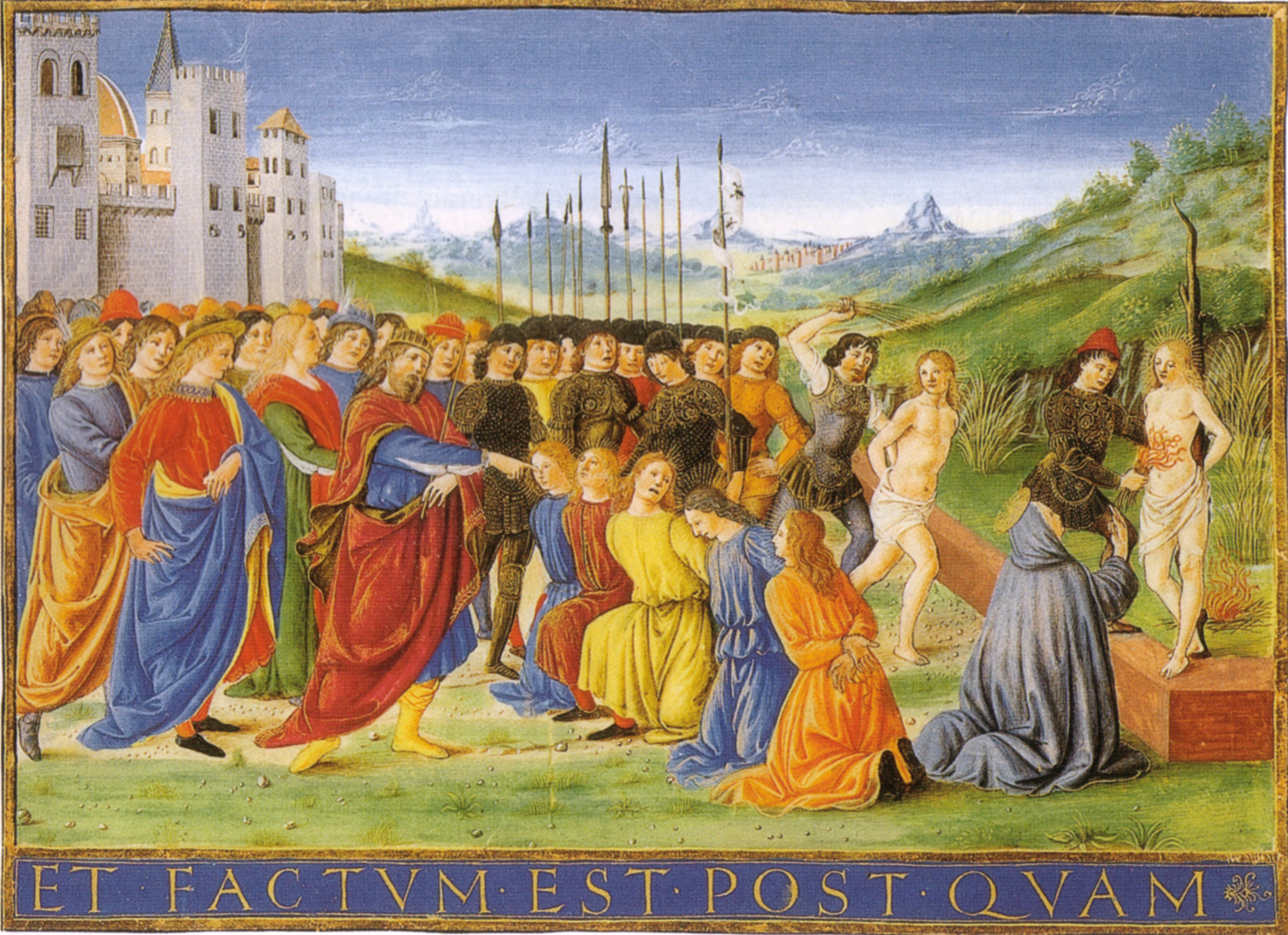
Martyrdom of the seven Hebrew brothers, Attavante degli Attavanti, Vatican Library

Martyrdom in Judaism is one of the main examples of Kiddush Hashem, meaning "sanctification of God's name" through public dedication to Jewish practice. Religious martyrdom is considered one of the more significant contributions of Hellenistic Judaism to Western Civilization. 1 Maccabees and 2 Maccabees recount numerous martyrdoms suffered by Jews resisting Hellenizing (adoption of Greek ideas or customs of a Hellenistic civilization) by their Seleucid overlords, being executed for such crimes as observing the Sabbath, circumcising their boys or refusing to eat pork or meat sacrificed to foreign gods. However, the notion of martyrdom in the Jewish and Christian traditions differ considerably.

There are times that the Hebrew Bible records that the Israelites, the ancestors of the Jews, are instructed to wage war against their enemies in the Bible sometimes as instructed by God or their leaders or both. Examples are wars against Amalek and the Seven Nations. Such wars are known as Milkhemet Mitzvah ("war by commandment" in Hebrew, or "Holy War") and any Israelite or Jew who is killed in the course of fighting for the cause is automatically regarded as having died al Kiddush Hashem ("for Sanctifying God's Name") and is hence a Jewish martyr.

==== Christianity ====
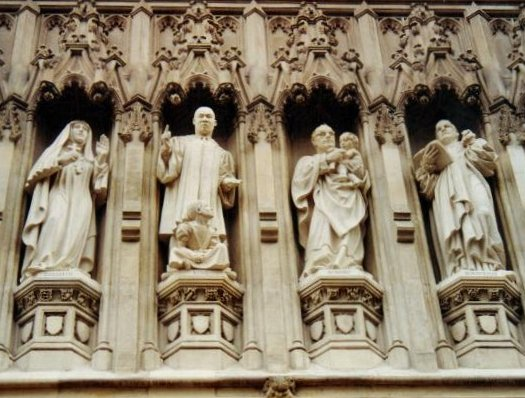
From the gallery of 20th century martyrs at Westminster Abbey—l. to r. Mother Elizabeth of Russia, Rev. Martin Luther King Jr., Archbishop Óscar Romero and Pastor Dietrich Bonhoeffer

In Christianity, a martyr, in accordance with the meaning of the original Greek term martys in the New Testament, is one who brings a testimony, usually written or verbal. In particular, the testimony is that of the Christian Gospel, or more generally, the Word of God. A Christian witness is a biblical witness whether or not death follows.

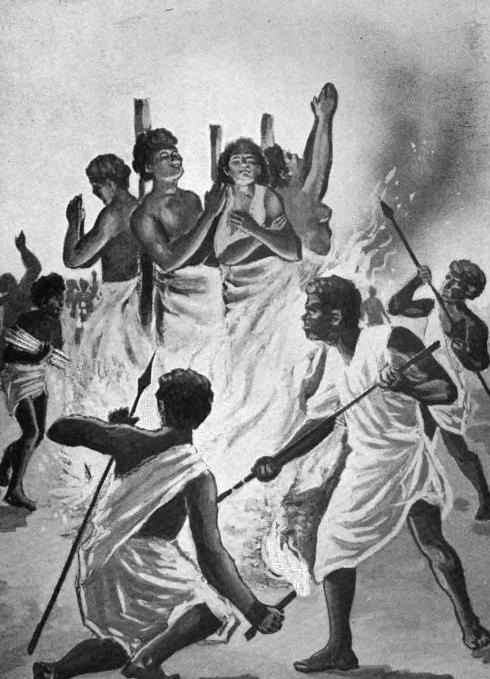
Illustration of Christian martyrs burned at the stake by the order of Ranavalona I in Madagascar

The concept of Jesus as a martyr has recently received greater attention. Analyses of the Passion narratives in the Gospels have led many scholars to conclude that they are martyrdom accounts in terms of genre and style. Several scholars have also concluded that Paul the Apostle understood Jesus' death as a martyrdom. In light of such conclusions, some have argued that the early Christians of the first three centuries would have interpreted the crucifixion of Jesus as a martyrdom.

In the context of church history, from the time of the persecution of early Christians in the Roman Empire under the Julio-Claudian dynasty, it developed that a martyr was one who was killed for maintaining a religious belief, knowing that this will almost certainly result in imminent death (though without intentionally seeking death). This definition of martyr is not specifically restricted to the Christian faith. Christianity recognizes certain Old Testament Jewish figures, like Abel and the Maccabees, as holy, and the New Testament mentions the imprisonment and beheading of John the Baptist, Jesus's possible cousin and his prophet and forerunner. The first Christian witness, after the establishment of the Christian faith at Pentecost, to be killed for his testimony was Saint Stephen (whose name means "crown"), and those who suffer martyrdom are said to have been "crowned". From the time of the Roman Emperor Constantine, Christianity was decriminalized, and then, under Theodosius I, became the state religion, which greatly diminished persecution (although not for non-Nicene Christians). As some wondered how then they could most closely follow Christ there was a development of desert spirituality characterized by a eremitic lifestyle, renunciation, self-mortification, and separation from the world, practiced by several desert monks and Christian ascetics in late antiquity (such as Paul the Hermit and Anthony the Great). This was a kind of white martyrdom, dying to oneself every day, as opposed to a red martyrdom, the giving of one's life in a violent death.

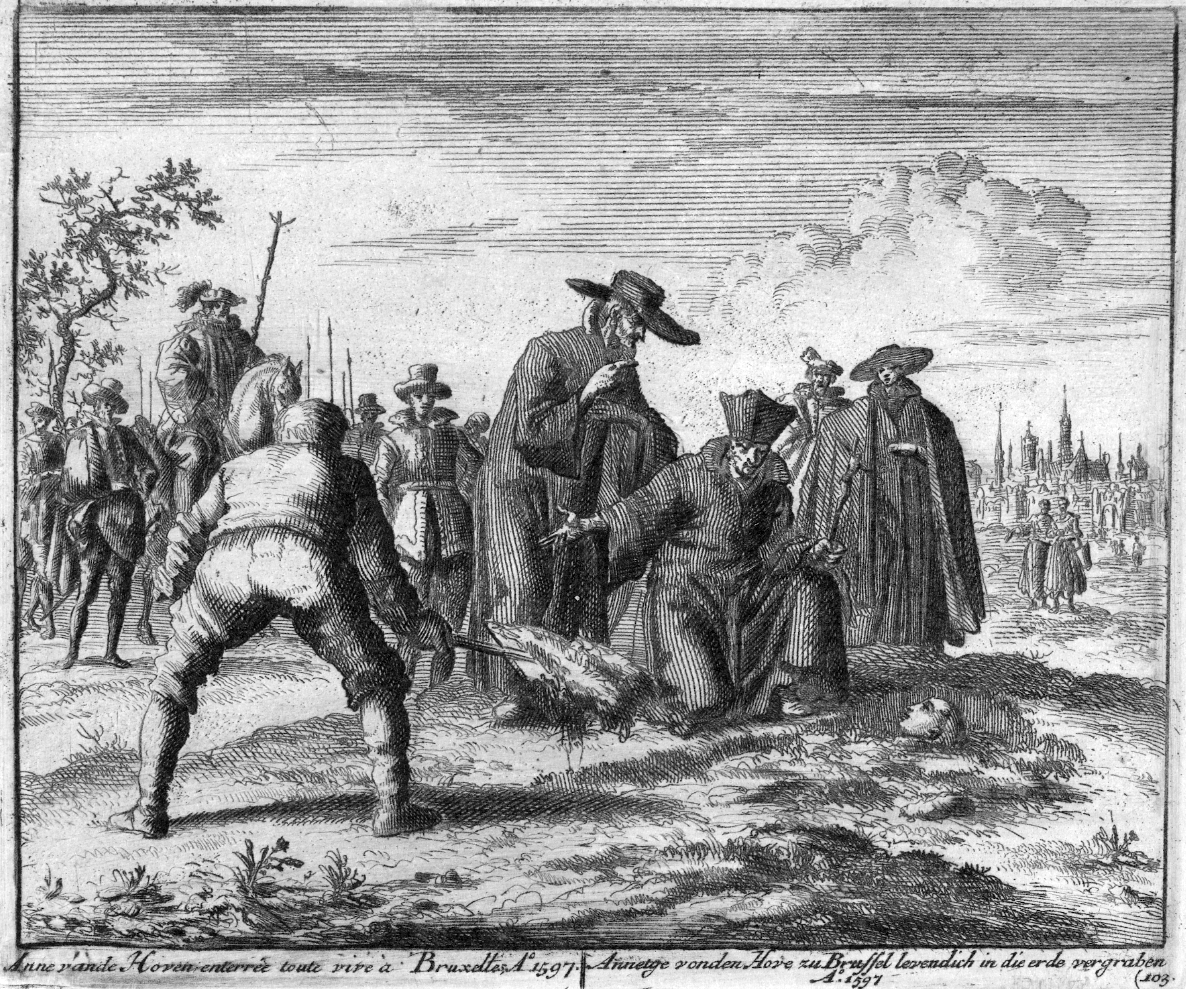
Jan Luyken's drawing of the Anabaptist Anna Utenhoven being buried alive at Vilvoorde (present-day Belgium) in 1597. In the engraving, her head is still above the ground and the Catholic priest is exhorting her to recant her faith, while the executioner stands ready to completely cover her up upon her refusal. This engraving was part of a major Protestant outrage praising Utenhoven as a martyr.

In the history of Christianity, death due to sectarian persecutions by other Christians has been regarded as martyrdom as well. There were martyrs recognized on both sides of the schism between the Roman Catholic Church and the Church of England after 1534. Two hundred and eighty-eight Christians were martyred for their faith by public burning between 1553 and 1558 by the Roman Catholic Queen Mary I in England leading to the reversion to the Church of England under Queen Elizabeth I in 1559. "From hundreds to thousands" of Waldensians were martyred in the Massacre of Mérindol in 1545. Three-hundred Roman Catholics were said to have been martyred by the Church authorities in England in the 16th and 17th centuries.

Even more modern day accounts of martyrdom for Christ exist, depicted in books such as Jesus Freaks, though the numbers are disputed. The claim that 100,000 Christians are killed for their faith annually is greatly exaggerated according to the BBC, with many of those deaths due to war, but the fact of ongoing Christian martyrdoms remains undisputed.

==== Islam ====
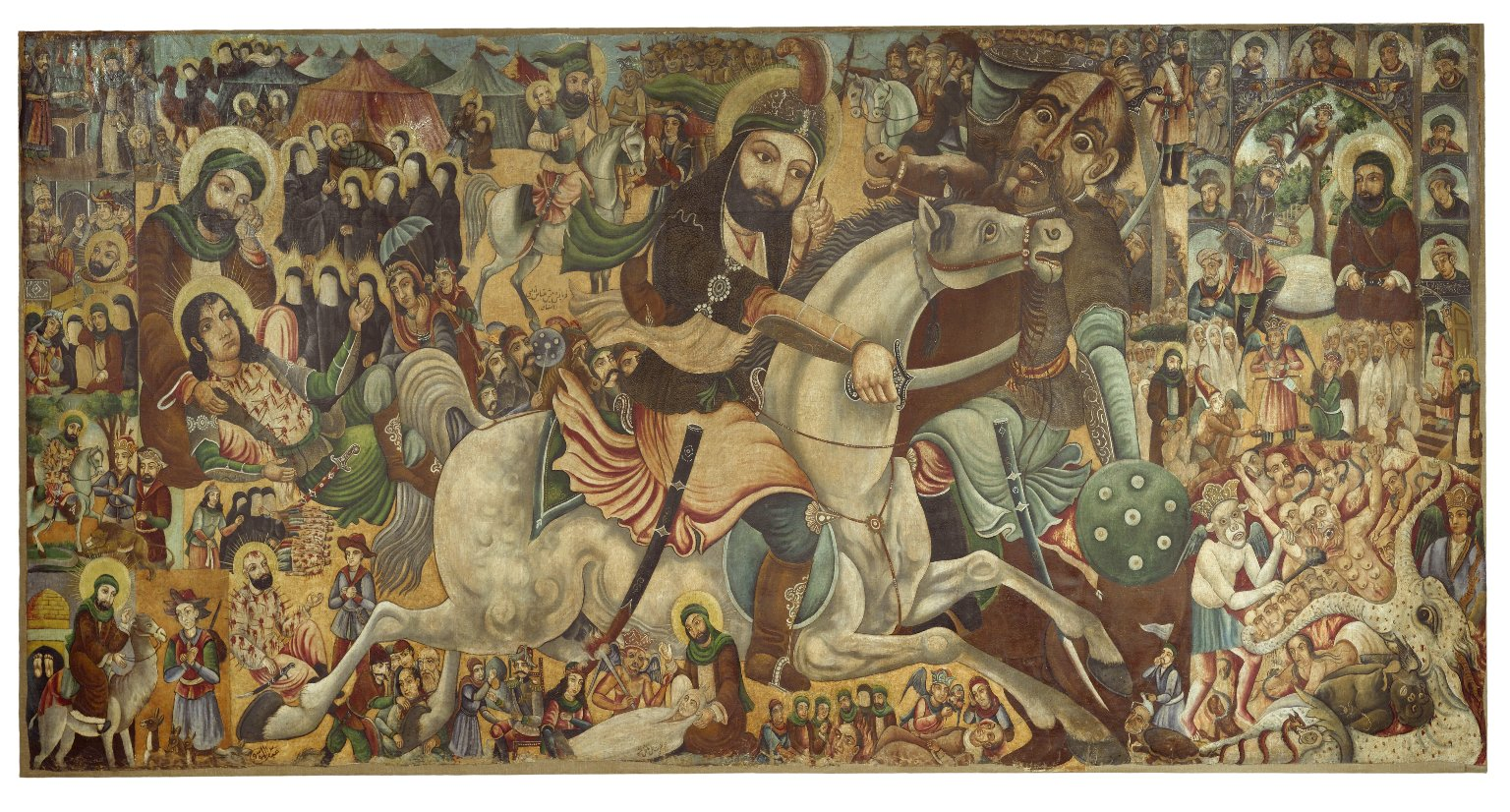
A painting commemorating the martyrdom of the 3rd Shia Imam Husayn ibn Ali at the Battle of Karbala in 680 AD

Shahid is an Arabic term in Islam meaning "witness", and is also used to denote a martyr; a female martyr is named shahida. The term Shahid occurs frequently in the Quran in the generic sense "witness", but only once in the sense "martyr, one who dies for his faith"; this latter sense acquires wider use in the ḥadīth literature. Islam views a martyr as a man or woman who dies while conducting jihad, whether on or off the battlefield (see greater jihad and lesser jihad).

The concept of martyrdom in Islam became prominent during the Islamic Revolution in Iran (1979) and the subsequent Iran–Iraq War (1980–1988), so that the cult of the martyr had a lasting impact on the course of revolution and war. Since the early 2000s, it has been primarily associated with Islamic extremism and jihadism.

==== Baháʼí Faith ====
In the Baháʼí Faith, martyrs are those who sacrifice their lives serving humanity in the name of God. However, Bahá'u'lláh, the founder of the Baháʼí Faith, discouraged the literal meaning of sacrificing one's life. Instead, he explained that martyrdom is devoting oneself to service to humanity.

A Course In Miracles (ACIM)

In A Course In Miracles, the author says "I do not call for martyrs but for teachers." (ACIM, T-6.I.16:3) In other words, suffering through martyrdom is not a way to demonstrate faith to God. Teachers, on the other hand, share the Word of God by living it, peacefully without a recourse to violence towards one self or others.

== Notable people entitled as religious martyrs ==
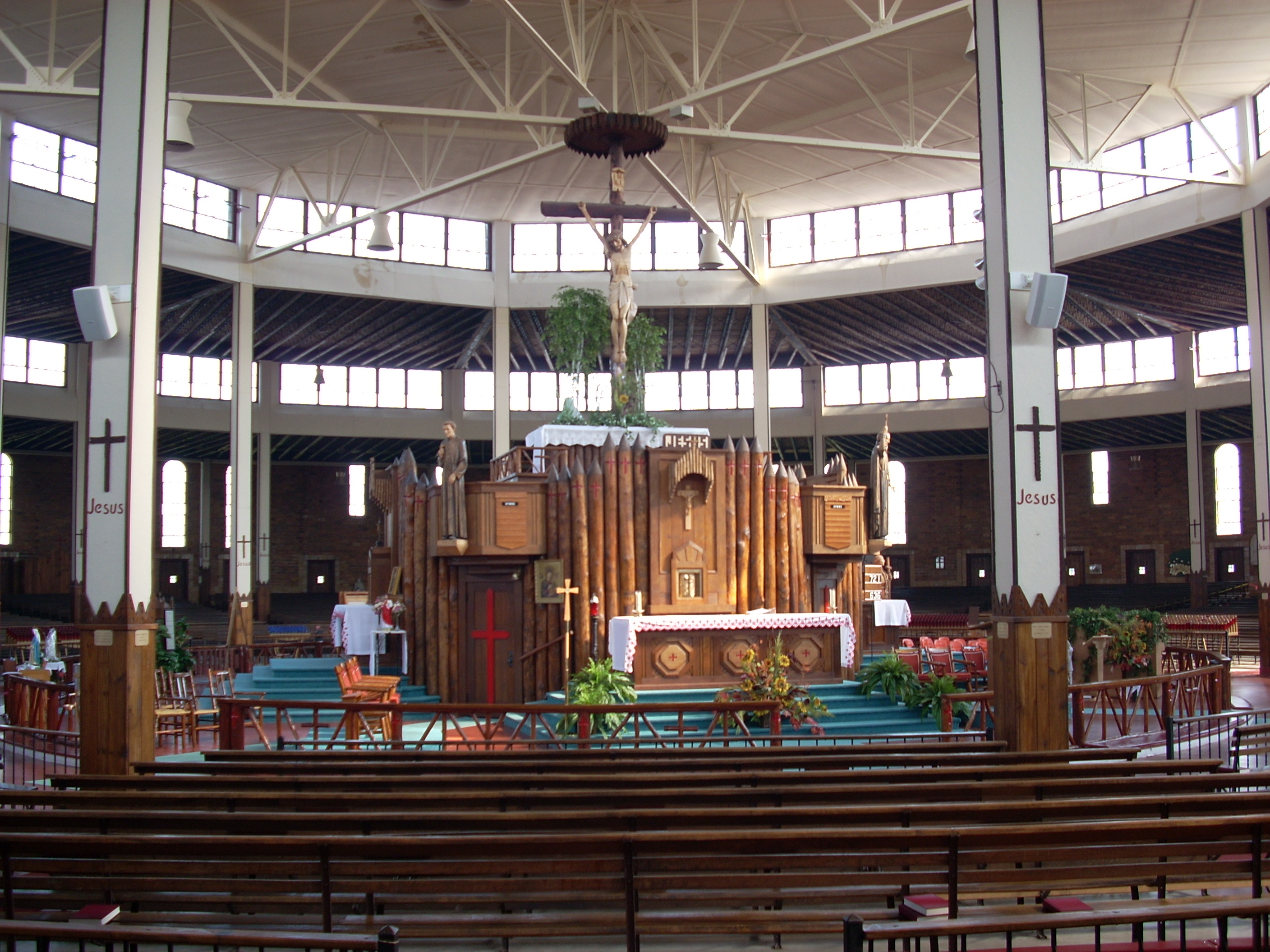
Interior of the Coliseum at the National Shrine of the North American Martyrs, Auriesville, New York, showing the sanctuary and high altar

- 399 BCE – Socrates, a Greek philosopher who chose to die rather than renounce his ideals.
- c. 34 CE – Saint Stephen, considered to be the first Christian martyr.
- c. 2nd century CE – Ten Martyrs of Judaism.
- c. 288 – Saint Sebastian, the subject of many works of art.
- c. 290 - Hripsime, Martyred after refusing a Marriage proposal by king Trdat III.
- c. 304 – Saint Agnes of Rome, beheaded for refusing to forsake her devotion to Christ, for Roman paganism.
- c. 450 – Moses the Black, Refused to flee an attack from a group of Mazices Raiders on his Monastery.
- c. 680 – Husayn ibn Ali, grandson of Muhammad beheaded for opposing the Umayyad Caliphate.
- c. 692 – Abd Allah ibn al-Zubayr, martyred for opposing the Umayyad Caliphate.
- 1415 – Jan Hus, Christian reformer burned at the stake for heresy.
- 1535 – Thomas More, beheaded for refusing to acknowledge Henry VIII as Supreme Head of the Church of England. Canonised in 1935.
- 1606 – Guru Arjan Dev, the fifth leader of Sikhism.
- 1675 – Guru Tegh Bahadur, the ninth guru of Sikhism, referred to as "Hind di Chadar" or "Shield of India" martyred in defense of religious freedom of Hindus.
- 1844 – Joseph Smith Jr., founder of Mormonism, killed by a mob in Carthage Jail, Illinois.
- 1918–1991 – New Martyrs and Confessors of the Russian Orthodox Church, persecuted by communists in the Soviet Union after the October Revolution.
- 1941 – Maximilian Kolbe, a Roman Catholic priest who was martyred in the Nazi concentration camp at Auschwitz.
- 1984 – Father Jerzy Popiełuszko, a Polish Catholic priest and a chaplain of Solidarity, was attacked and murdered by Security Service agents.

== Political meanings ==
In politics, a martyr is someone who suffers persecution and/or death for advocating, renouncing, refusing to renounce, and/or refusing to advocate a political belief or cause.

=== Sovereignty ===
The leaders of the 1916 Easter Rising were executed for organising an armed insurrection in Ireland during Easter Week in April 1916. A series of courts martial began on 2 May, in which 187 people were tried. Controversially, Maxwell decided that the courts martial would be held in secret and without a defence, which Crown law officers later ruled to have been illegal. Ninety were sentenced to death. Fifteen of those (including all seven signatories of the Proclamation of Independence ) had their sentences confirmed by Maxwell and fourteen were executed by firing squad at Kilmainham Gaol between 3 and 12 May..

The Manchester Martyrs were three Irishmen executed after being convicted for the murder of a Manchester City Police officer in 1867. The day after the executions, Frederick Engels wrote to Karl Marx: "Yesterday morning the Tories, by the hand of Mr Calcraft, accomplished the final act of separation between England and Ireland. The only thing that the Fenians still lacked were martyrs. ... To my knowledge, the only time that anybody has been executed for a similar matter in a civilised country was the case of John Brown at Harpers Ferry. The Fenians could not have wished for a better precedent." Ten Irish Republican Army members died during a 1981 hunger strike, including Bobby Sands.

The Belfiore martyrs (in Italian, Martiri di Belfiore) were a group of Italian pro-independence fighters condemned to death by hanging in 1853 during the Italian Risorgimento. They included Tito Speri and the priest Enrico Tazzoli and are named after the site where the sentence was carried out, in the valley of Belfiore at the south entrance to Mantua.

=== Unionism ===
The Tolpuddle Martyrs were a group of 19th century agricultural labourers in Dorset, England, who were arrested for and convicted of swearing a secret oath as members of the Friendly Society of Agricultural Labourers. The rules of the society showed it was clearly structured as a friendly society, that is, a mutual association for the purposes of insurance, pensions, savings or cooperative banking; and it operated as a trade-specific benefit society. But at the time, friendly societies had strong elements of what are now considered to be the principal role of trade unions, and wages were at issue. The Tolpuddle Martyrs were sentenced not to death but to transportation to Australia, a harsh form of exile.

=== Communism ===
In the People's Republic of China, people who died in the cause of the Communist Party—most particularly the many victims of the 1927 Shanghai massacre but also including devoted humanitarians during the Chinese Civil War such as the Canadian physician Tillson Harrison—are honored and commemorated as martyrs. The red scarf worn by the 100+ million Young Pioneers honors their spilt blood. Jiang Zhuyun and Liu Hulan are notable female martyrs who have been commemorated in various media. Notable monuments include the Monument to the People's Heroes at the confluence of Suzhou Creek and the Huangpu River in central Shanghai and the Longhua Martyrs' Memorial.

Many communist activists have died as martyrs in India, due to their allegiance to various communist parties, such as the CPI(M) and the CPI. Most of them hail from mainly leftist states such as Kerala, and Tripura. In Kerala, many are killed in protests by the police, and some are assassinated by activists in other political parties, such as the INC and the RSS. The district of Kannur has reported to have had the most political murders. Here, the RSS are known to have used brutal violence to eliminate CPI(M) workers.

=== Civil rights movement ===
In the United States, the assassinations of Malcolm X in 1965 and Martin Luther King Jr. in 1968 have been linked to their leadership in movements to improve the rights and quality of life of black citizens, black nationalism and the civil rights movement respectively.

== Notable people entitled as political martyrs ==
A political martyr is someone who suffers persecution or death for advocating, renouncing, refusing to renounce, or refusing to advocate a political belief or cause.

- 1835 – King Hintsa kaKhawuta, a Xhosa monarch who was shot and killed while attempting to escape captivity during Sixth Frontier War, also known as the Hintsa War.
- 1859 – John Brown, a militant abolitionist who was executed after his raid on Harper's Ferry. Many abolitionists of the time extolled him as a martyr.
- 1865 – Abraham Lincoln, 16th U.S. President. Assassinated by a Confederate sympathizer John Wilkes Booth after the end of the American Civil War.
- 1967 – Che Guevara, a Marxist–Leninist revolutionary in Cuba, the Congo, and Bolivia who was captured and executed in Bolivia. He has since become a figure of political protests and revolutions worldwide.
- 2024 – Alexei Navalny, a Russian opposition leader, lawyer, anti-corruption activist, and political prisoner who died while serving a 19-year prison sentence in the corrective colony FKU IK-3.

== Revolutionary martyr ==
The term "revolutionary martyr" usually relates to those dying in revolutionary struggle. During the 20th century, the concept was developed in particular in the culture and propaganda of communist or socialist revolutions, although it was and is also used in relation to nationalist revolutions.

- In France, the assassination of radical Jacobin leader Jean-Paul Marat by Charlotte Corday in 1793 led to his veneration as a martyr of the French Revolution.
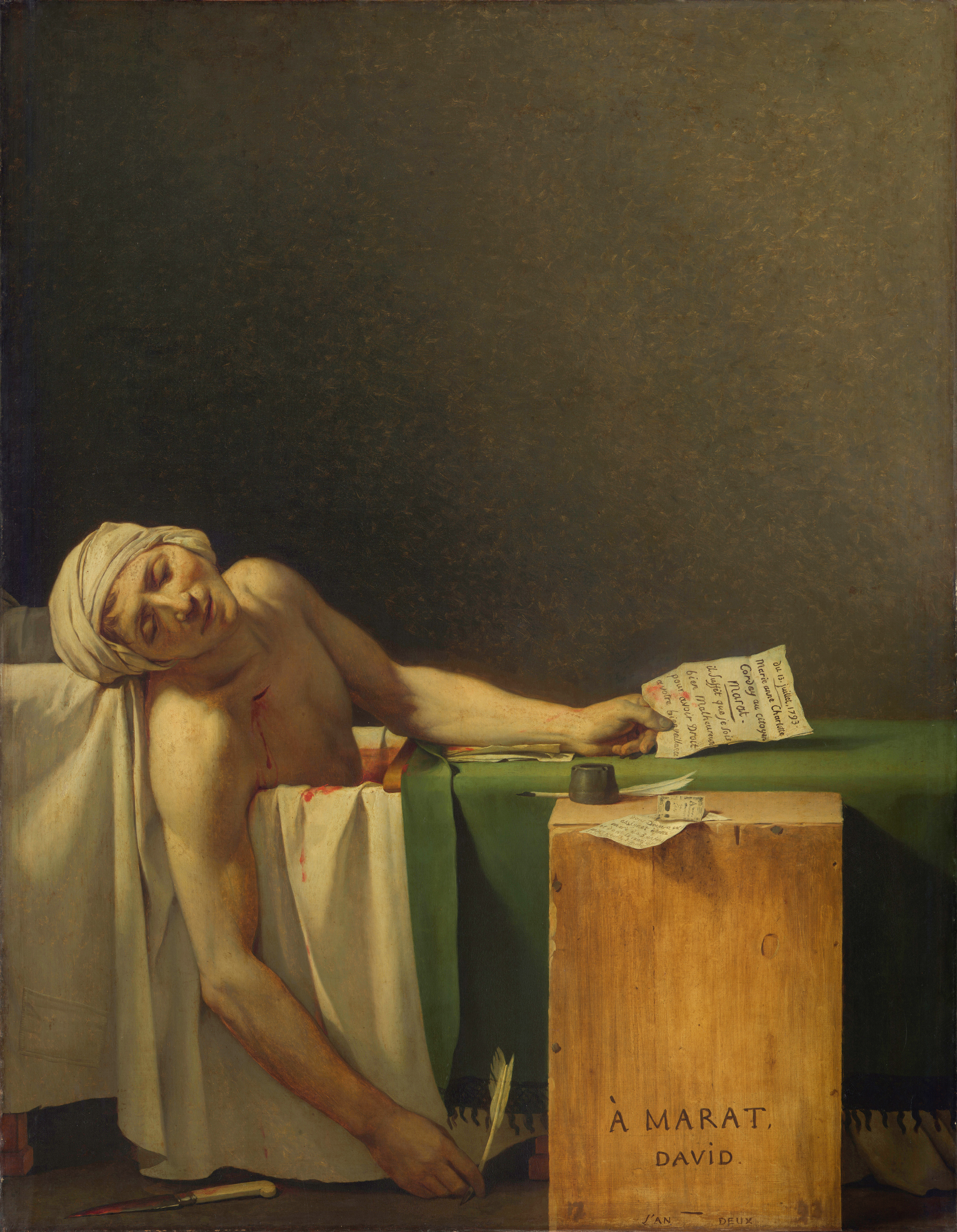
  The Death of Marat (1793) by Jacques-Louis David, depicting Marat shortly after his assassination
  The painting, created by artist and politician Jacques-Louis David, immortalized Marat as a revolutionary icon.
- In the culture of North Korea, martyrdom is a consistent theme in the ongoing revolutionary struggle, as depicted in literary works such as Sea of Blood. There is also a Revolutionary Martyrs' Cemetery in the country.
- In Vietnam, those who died in the independence struggle are often honoured as martyrs, or liệt sĩ in Vietnamese. Nguyễn Thái Học and schoolgirl Võ Thị Sáu are two examples.
- In India, the term "revolutionary martyr" is often used when referring to the world history of socialist struggle. Guru Radha Kishan was a notable Indian independence activist and communist politician known to have used this phrasing.
- In Algeria, those who died in the Algerian war for independence are officially recognized as martyrs.
- In Colombia, Camilo Torres Restrepo is recognized as a martyr.

== See also ==
- Martyr complex
- Martyrology
- Martyrs Mirror

== Bibliography ==
- "Martyrs", Catholic Encyclopedia
- Foster, Claude R. Jr. (1995). Paul Schneider, the Buchenwald apostle: a Christian martyr in Nazi Germany: A Sourcebook on the German Church Struggle. Westchester, PA: SSI Bookstore, West Chester University. ISBN 978-1-887732-01-7
- History.com Editors. "Abolitionist John Brown Is Hanged". History.com, 4 Mar. 2010, www.history.com/this-day-in-history/john-brown-hanged.
