= Tazzoli =

Tazzoli may refer to:

- Enrico Tazzoli (priest), an Italian priest who was one of the Belfiore martyrs
- Italian submarine Enrico Tazzoli, more than one submarine of the Italian Navy
