= Dottesio =

Dottesio is a surname. Notable people with the surname include:

- Attilio Dottesio (1909–1989), Italian actor
- Luigi Dottesio (1814–1851), Italian patriot
