= Carlo Lombardi =

Carlo Lombardi may refer to:

- Carlo Lombardi (actor) (1900–1984), Italian actor
- Carlo Lombardi (architect) (1559–1620), Italian architect of the Renaissance period
- Carlo Lombardi (politician), see Legislature III of Italy
- Carlo Lombardi (Unionist soldier) (1834–1865), Italian patriot and soldier
- Carlo Lombardi, birth name of British artist Carl Randall
- Carlo Francis Lombardi (1897–1983), World War One ace and founder of the AVIA aviation company
