= Belfiore martyrs =

Group of pro-independence fighters during the Italian Risorgimento

Coordinates: 45°9′24″N 10°46′19″E

The Belfiore martyrs were a group of pro-independence fighters condemned to death by hanging between 1852 and 1853 during the Italian Risorgimento. They included Tito Speri and the priest Enrico Tazzoli and are named after the site where the sentence was carried out, in the valley of Belfiore at the south entrance to Mantua. The hanging was the first in a long series of death sentences imposed by Josef Radetzky, governor general of Lombardy–Venetia. As a whole these sentences marked the culmination of Austrian repression after the First Italian War of Independence and marked the failure of all re-pacification policies.

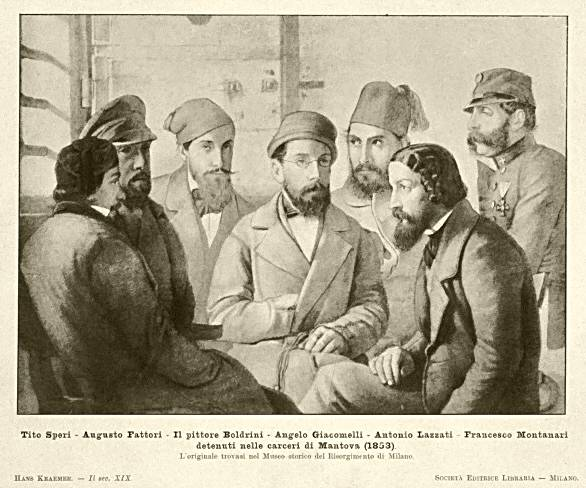
"Speri, Fattori, the painter Boldrini, Giacomelli, Lazzati and Montanari imprisoned in Mantua in 1853", retouched reduction, lithograph

== Mantua ==
The city of Mantua had formed part of the lands of the Austrian House of Habsburg since 1707. It was the capital of a small but quite rich dukedom, as well as being of some military importance, both for the quality of its fortifications but also for its geographic position, allowing it to control the route between the Veneto and Lombardy and a large number of crossings over the River Po. Indeed, the city had been at the centre of the 1797 campaign during the French Revolutionary Wars, with repeated Austrian invasions of the area until Eugène de Beauharnais surrendered it to Heinrich Johann Bellegarde on 23 April 1814. It was thus logical that, from 1815 onwards, the Austrians turned the whole city into a kind of large stronghold, perhaps the strongest one in the Lombardy-Veneto.

Such a militarised city was very well suited to house what could in modern terms be called a maximum security prison (in the castello di San Giorgio) to hold the Lombard and Venetic patriots, imprisoned for their opposition to the Austrian occupation. The French had also thought the city suitable for a prison when, on 20 February 1810, the Tyrolean rebel leader Andreas Hofer was executed in Mantua for leading a rebellion in two of Napoleon's client states.

== Political context ==
Charles Albert of Sardinia had united the Sardinian army and countless volunteers from Lombardy, Veneto and many other Italian regions, but the defeat of his force by Radetzky at Novara in 1849 led to a hardening in the Austrian government's attitude. In just one year, from August 1848 to August 1849, the Austrians carried out 961 hangings and executions, requisitioned many expatriates' goods and imposed heavy taxes and extraordinary taxes on the people. The repressive policy was directly carried out by field marshal Radetzky, governor general, but strongly supported from the imperial court in Vienna. In all, they allowed no ambiguity as to the occupying power's real intentions.

The atmosphere became even worse with two visits by emperor Franz Joseph in 1851 (in March–April to Venice and in September–October to Milan, Como and Monza), which showed up how little success Radetzky's policy had had in winning over the region's population and nobility to the Habsburg regime. These failed visits led Radetzky to issue two proclamations (on 22 February and 19 July 1851) decreeing that anyone found in possession of 'revolutionary' writings would be sentenced to 1 to 5 years in prison, reimposing the state of siege, holding the city collectively responsible for housing secret societies (even unknowingly).

== The Mantua plot ==
Discontent in the region grew yet more and the patriots began to organise and meet secretly. A section organised itself in Mantua, with its first meeting on 2 November 1850 attended by 10 patriots, including the engineers Attilio Mori and Giovanni Chiassi, the teacher Carlo Marchi, Giovanni Acerbi, the lawyer Luigi Castellazzo, Achille Sacchi and the Mantuan doctor Carlo Poma. The group's inspiration was Enrico Tazzoli, a prelate close to the Mazzinian movement. In particular it had contacts with notable figures such as Tito Speri, protagonist in the Ten Days of Brescia, and Antonio Scarsellini of Legnano, in Venice. Proclamations were printed, cells founded in Milan, Venice, Brescia, Verona, Padua, Treviso, and Vicenza, and money collected to finance the revolutionary activities via 'interprovincial loan folders' organised by Mazzini. It was these folders that led to the arrest of Luigi Dottesio from Como, hanged in Venice on 11 October 1851. That execution was followed, at the end of 1851, by that of Don Giovanni Grioli, pastor of Cerese, arrested on 28 October and condemned to death on 5 November for having tried to cause two Hungarian soldiers to desert and for possessing revolutionary literature.

== Arrest ==
With a renewal in the repressive climate, the Austrian police increased their surveillance activities in Mantua and on 1 January 1852 commissioner Rossi found a folder of 25 francs from a Mazzinian loan during a raid on the home of Luigi Pesci, city tax collector in Castiglione delle Stiviere. The raid was on charges of Pesci's forging Austrian bank notes and so the discovery came as a surprise. Under fierce interrogation, Pesci revealed that the folder came from the priest don Ferdinando Bosio, a friend of Tazzoli and professor of grammar at the episcopal seminary in Mantua. Bosio was then arrested and after 24 days confessed and indicated that don Enrico Tazzoli was the movement's coordinator. Tazzoli was then arrested on 27 January, and with him many documents were seized, such as a register in which he had encrypted annotated receipts and expenditures, with the names of members who had paid money.

== Torture and trial ==
The trial lasted from January 1852 till March 1853, and the first death sentences were pronounced in December 1852.

Tazzoli did not give in to his interrogators, led by the judicial auditor Alfred Krauss, but the police managed to decipher the register thanks to informing by the Mantuan lawyer Giulio Faccioli and by one of the society's members, the son of Luigi Castellazzo (a commissioner of police). This allowed them to move on to arresting Poma, Speri, Montanari and other members in Mantua, Verona, Brescia and Venice, with 110 patriots being arrested in total, as well as 30 (including Benedetto Cairoli) condemned in absentia.

The Austrian police and occupying government evidently exaggerated the society's extent, putting most of the prisoners under torture. Most confessed, some died before they could do so, and Pezzotto even chose to commit suicide in his cell at the Castello di Milano. In the end 110 people came to trial. Krauss supported the Austrian belief in the existence of an association in Mantua and of committees in other provinces, communicating with Mazzini and expatriates in Switzerland, attempts by Carlo Montanari to map the fortifications of Mantua and Verona, a plan by the Trentine patriot Igino Sartena for an attempt on Radetzky's life, another plan to capture Franz Josef on his visit to Venice (both of which plans Poma and Speri had in the end quashed as impractical).

== Sentence and intervention of the bishop of Mantua ==
Tazzoli and Ottonelli, being two priests, could in theory only be judged by the Vatican Foro Ecclesiastico. The Bishop of Mantua Giovanni Corti explained the situation to Pope Pius IX in a letter sent on 20 July 1852, asking for an intercession with emperor Franz Joseph I of Austria in order to avoid further capital punishments. The Vatican replied on 1 September, mentioning that a mediation with the Austrian government did take place, but there was not much hope. Should the priests be found guilty, they will have to be degraded.

The Austrian trial on 13 November ended with the death sentence being pronounced for all ten defendants. Tazzoli, Poma, Scarsellini, Canal, and Zambelli will later be hanged, while through the intervention of Corti the sentence for Paganoni, Mangili, Quintavalle, Ottonelli and Faccioli was turned into 8–12 years of imprisonment.

The rite of defrocking of Tazzoli and Ottonelli took place on 24 November.

== Executions ==
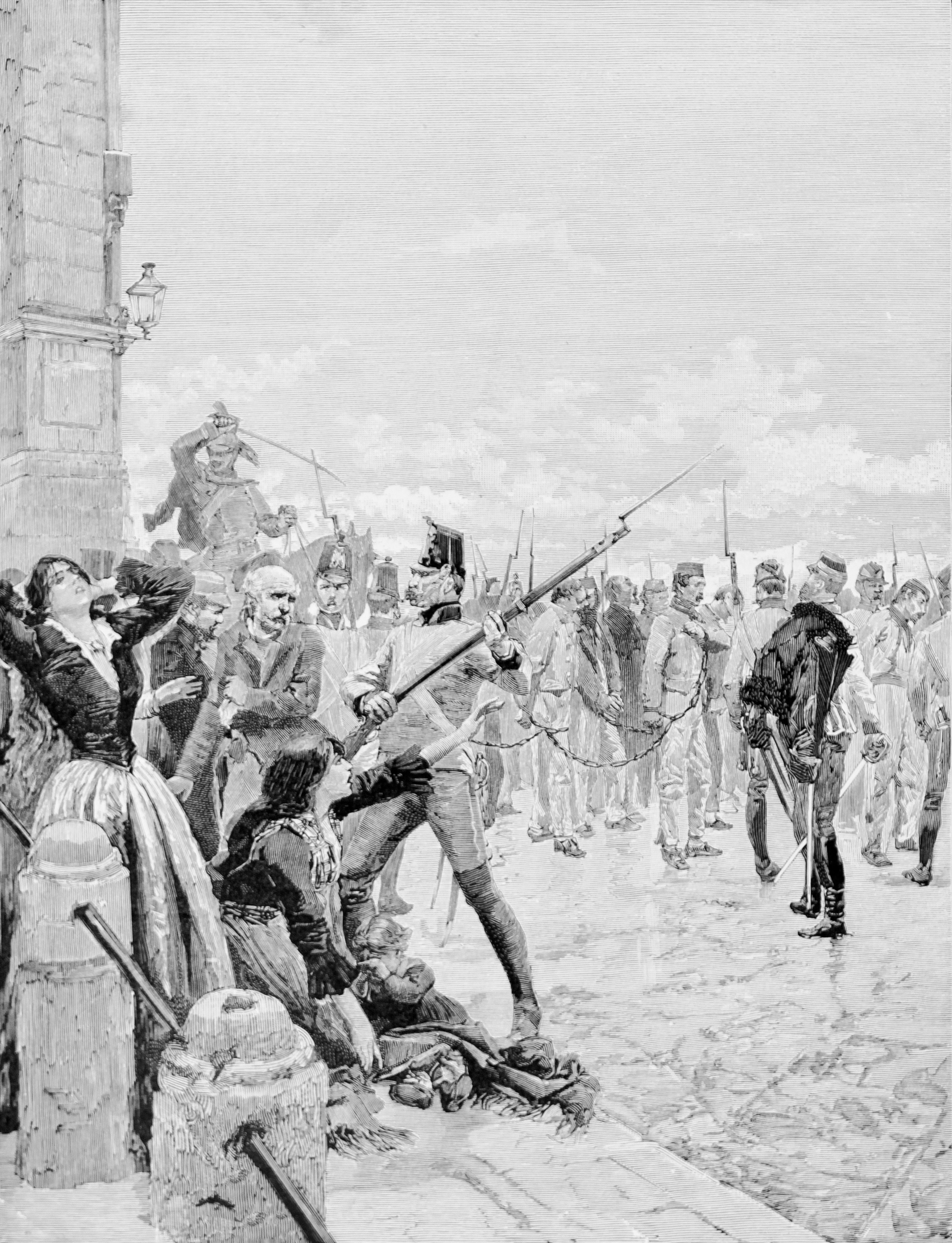
Martyrs led to the scaffold by Edoardo Matania

The five convicts were hanged in Belfiore on 7 November.

Tito Speri, Carlo Montanari, and Bartolomeo Grazioli were put to death in Belfiore on 3 March 1853. Pietro Frattini was hanged on March 19. Pier Fortunato Calvi, the last of the Belfiore Martyrs, was executed on 4 July 1855.

== Subsequent events ==
After the Second Italian Independence War Mantua remained in Austrian hands. During June 1866, in preparation for the Third Italian War of Independence, the Austrian commander ordered work to reinforce Mantua's fortifications. As part of those works it proved necessary to excavate the sand needed for the work on the city walls and in doing so the chiefs of works from the Andreani family (father and son) recovered what were identified as the martyrs' remains (only those of Pietro Frattini and don Grioli, found in 1867, were missing). The Andreani kept the discovery secret and asked their absent Austrian contractors to speed up the work by working at night. The Austrians' absence allowed the wall-workers to transport the corpses to a city cemetery in great secrecy. Funeral rites for the remains were finally celebrated some months after this, when Mantua became part of the Kingdom of Italy at the end of the Third Independence War.

Tazzoli continued to be honoured throughout the Mantua diocese, led by Monsignor Giovanni Corti, who Tazzoli had authorised to publish the sermons Tazzoli had written in jail. Tazzoli had done a great service to the Roman Catholic Church when, under Austrian interrogation, he had written that the Mantuan clergy were as faithful to the revolt as to Catholic tradition, "with spirit adhering to the social and practical value of men's education and training ... and to implement what was necessary to be free. May God forgive me."
