= Carlo Lombardi (Unionist soldier) =

- Born: February 28, 1834; Brescia, Kingdom of Lombardy–Venetia
- Died: January 16, 1865 (aged 30) Wilmington, North Carolina, US
- Allegiance: Kingdom of Sardinia; United States of America
- Branch: (Kingdom of Sardinia) Piedmontese Army (United States) Union Army
- Service years: 1849 - 1861 (Sardinia); 1861 - 1865 (US)
- Rank: Captain
- Conflicts: First Italian War of Independence; Ten Days of Brescia; Battle of Aspromonte; American Civil War

Carlo Lombardi (28 February 1834 – 16 January 1865) was an Italian patriot and soldier whose military career as an officer spanned from the Risorgimento - the Italian Unification Wars - to the American Civil War.

== Early years ==
Lombari was born on 28 February 1834 in Brescia, Kingdom of Lombardy–Venetia, to Giuseppe and Elisabetta Torelli. He took part in Italian patriotic movements from a very young age. At the time, the northernmost part of the Italian Peninsula (except the Sardinian-Piedmontese Kingdom) was included in the Kingdom of Lombardy–Venetia. De facto this was a client state of the Austrian-Hungarian Empire, which sought to crush any semblance of conspiracy by extreme measures, including imprisonment, exile or execution. Therefore, those who, like Lombardi, engaged in activities aimed at ousting the Austrians from the land had a Sword of Damocles constantly hanging over their head.

After the Piedmontese were defeated in the Battle of Custoza (1848), Lombardi sought refuge in the friendly Kingdom of Sardinia and enlisted in the 20º Reggimento Fanteria, participating in the latter stages of the First Italian War of Independence in 1849. In that same year he also managed to return to his native city and take part to the Ten Days of Brescia between 23 March and 1 April. After the uprising was crushed he returned to Piedmont, but was arrested on occasion of the Milan revolt (1853).

Unlike fellow citizen Tito Speri (a central figure in the Brescia insurrection) who was hanged, Lombardi managed to avoid the noose by fleeing to the United States. He came back to Italy in 1859 to fight in the Second Italian War of Independence, and the following year he enlisted in the Medici expedition (that took place after Garibaldi's Expedition of the Thousand). He was wounded at Milazzo and promoted to the rank of captain. Soon after, he obtained a discharge from the Army to stay with the Redshirts and followed Garibaldi even in the Battle of Aspromonte. In 1863 he left Italy for good and settled in the United States.

== Union Army career ==
As soon as Lombardi landed in the States he enlisted, again as a captain, in the Union Army where he was appointed command of a Company of African-American soldiers, distinguishing himself for "uncommon bravery".

== Death ==
He took part in the Second Battle of Fort Fisher, North Carolina, viewed by many as decisive in the American Civil War. He died there on 16 January 1865, when the powder magazine in the fortress accidentally detonated causing hundreds of casualties on both sides. The Confederate garrison had surrendered just one day earlier.

== Homage ==
Carlo Lombardi was mentioned in the exhibition Brescia per l'America per Brescia, dedicated to Brescian citizens who contributed to any fields of American history and culture. The exhibition was hosted in the city museum Santa Giulia in Summer 2010.

== See also ==
- Risorgimento
- Italian diaspora
- Charles DeRudio, another expatriate Italian fighting in US Army
- Luigi Palma di Cesnola, Italian-born Medal of Honor winner.

== Sources ==
Antonio Fappani, Enciclopedia bresciana volume 7. Published by La Voce del Popolo, Brescia, 1987.
