= Pietro Frattini =

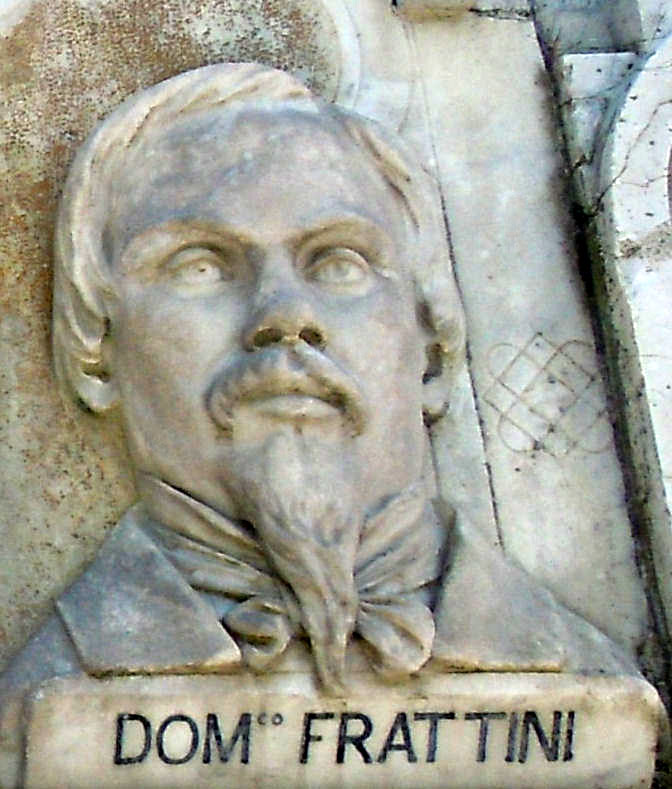
Frattini on the Belfiore monument

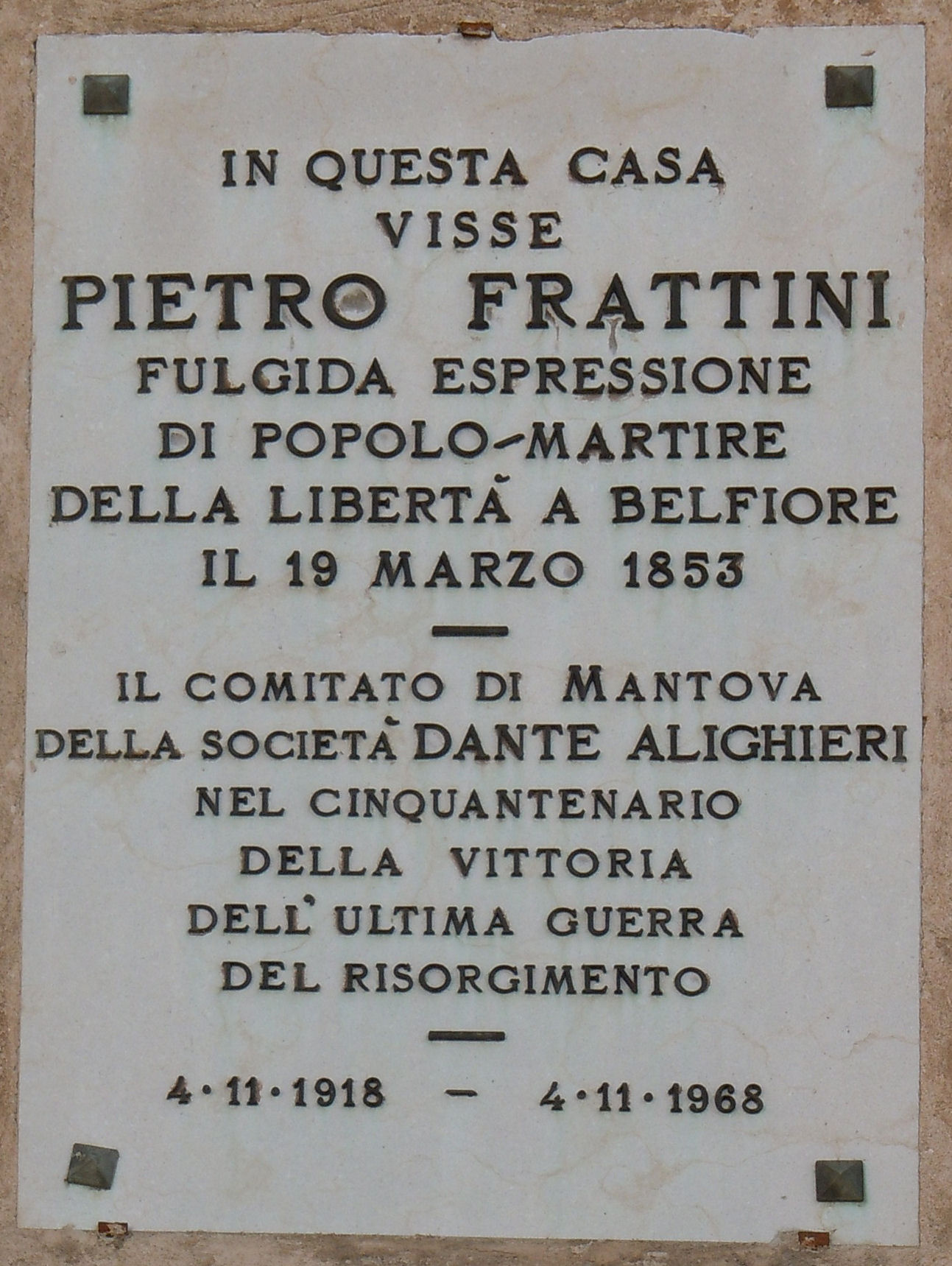
Commemorative plaque in Mantua

Pietro Domenico Frattini (1 December 1821 – 19 March 1853) was a supporter of Italian unification and one of the Belfiore martyrs.

== Life ==
He was born in Vigo di Legnago, but moved to Mantua at the age of 15, and was converted to the Republican ideas of Mazzini by the Revolutions of 1848. He was one of the first people to join the Guardia Civica formed in the province. During the First Italian War of Independence he took part in the first battle of Governolo. After the battle of Novara he joined Giuseppe Garibaldi in his defence of the Roman Republic and was seriously injured during the clashes at the Villa Doria Pamphilj.

Following the Austrian Empire's amnesty in October 1849, Frattini returned to Mantua and quickly joined the Mantuan Insurrectional Committee, hiding its secret press in his home and bringing supporters of unification to Mantua from other cities in Italy. He and the other Belfiore martyrs were incriminated by Luigi Castellazzo's confession, arrested on 26 October 1852 and condemned to hang for high treason. The execution took place at Belfiore on 19 March 1853, one hour before the announcement of an amnesty for Francis Joseph I of Austria's birthday. The precise instructions to Josef Radetzky for the executions forbade him from delaying them - they had been personally set by Francis Joseph with advice from his main counsellor Karl Grünne.
