= Giuseppe Finzi =

Italian politician

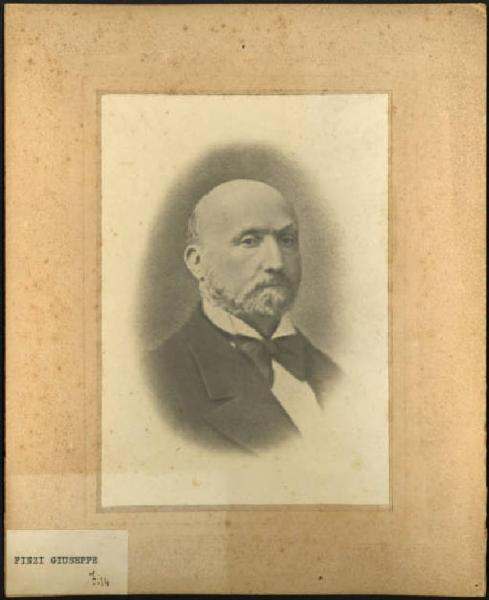

Senator of the Kingdom of Italy
- In office 1860–1886

Personal details
- Born: 17 February 1815 Rivarolo Mantovano
- Died: 7 June 1886 (aged 71) Mantua
- Resting place: Canicossa di Marcaria Cemetery
- Parent(s): Abraham and Rosa Finzi

Giuseppe Finzi (Rivarolo Mantovano 17 February 1815 - Mantua 7 June 1886) was a patriot and Italian politician.

== Biography ==
Finzi was born in 1815 in Rivarolo Mantovano by Abraham and Rosa Finzi, both Jewish family . He was already a student at the Young Italy of Giuseppe Mazzini and, in 1848, at the outbreak of the first war of independence he enlisted in the Piedmontese army. After the defeat of the battle of Novara Giuseppe Garibaldi followed in the defense of the Roman Republic.

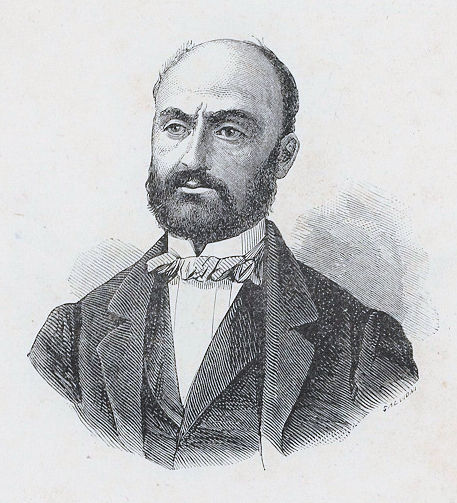
1861 Portrait by Aristide Calani from Parlamento del Regno d'Italia

He was involved in the facts of the Mazzinian conspiracy of Mantua in 1852, arrested in his villa in Canicossa di Marcaria on the night of 16 June 1852, he was one of the few who never confessed and thus escaped the death penalty, but was condemned by of the Austrian military judiciary at 18 years of hard prison, then condoned in 1856 . He served four years in prison in part in the prisons of Josephstadt and Theresienstadt near Prague . Released on 2 December 1856, he was one of the main accusers of Luigi Castellazzo which always pointed out as the traitor of the conspirators from Mantua, called the Martyrs of Belfiore.

In 1859 the Piedmontese government appointed him extraordinary commissioner for the province of Mantua, from which he was dismissed by the Minister of the Interior, Urban Rattazzi, on 2 October 1859 for violating the agreements signed with the armistice of Villafranca di Verona.

Giuseppe Finzi was elected a Member of Parliament on 25 March 1860 for the constituency of Viadana. He retained the parliamentary mandate until the elections of 1882, being elected in various constituencies: Milan V, Borghetto Lodigiano, Bologna and Pesaro. On 7 June 1886, King Umberto I finally nominated Finzi as a senator, on the proposal of Augustine Depretis, but before he had been sworn into office he died at his house in Canicossa. He was buried in the cemetery of Canicossa di Marcaria, Mantua.

== Bibliography ==
- Alessandro Luzio, The martyrs of Belfiore and their process, Tipografia Editrice LF Cogliati, Milan 1908.
- Simonetta Bono, Luigi Castellazzo and the Mantua trials of 1852-53 in the light of some documents, in the Historical Review of the Risorgimento, 43, 1956, n ° 1, January–March.
- Giuseppe Solitro, After Belfiore and the degree of Luigi Castellazzo, Historical Review of the Risorgimento, 1936.
- Costantino Cipolla, Belfiore, Franco Angeli publisher, Milan 2006.
- Palmiro Ghidetti, Rivarolo Mantovano. Historical itinerary, Rivarolo Mantovano, 1985
