= Castello di San Giorgio, Mantua =

Castle in Mantua, Italy

Coordinates: 45.1609°N 10.8000°E

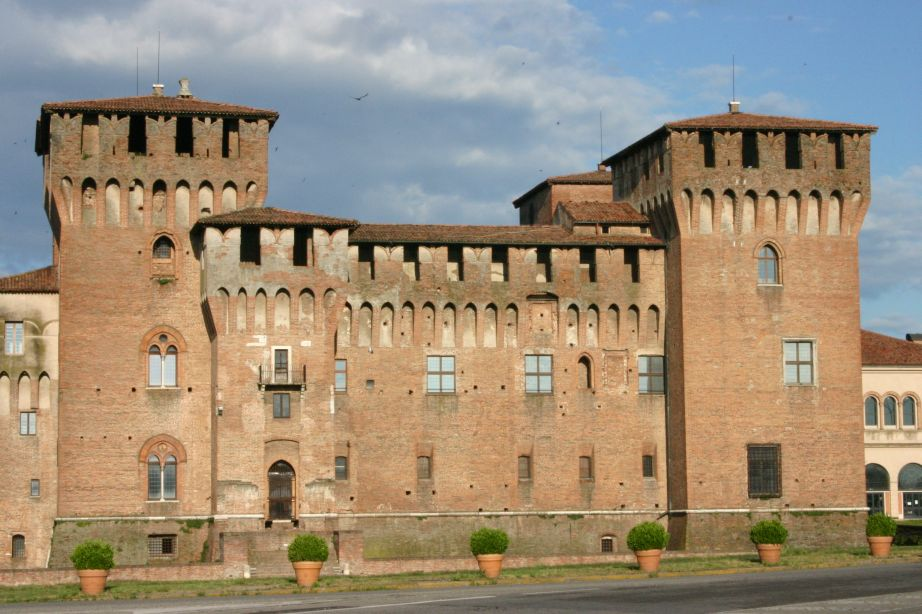
The Castello

The Castello di San Giorgio is part of the Ducal palace of Mantua. It is a moated rectangular castle, each of which's four corners has a large tower and the moat is crossed by three drawbridges.

== History ==
It was built between 1395 and 1406 on the ruins of the church of Santa Maria di Capo di Bove for Francesco I Gonzaga, to designs by Bartolino da Novara. Ludovico III Gonzaga gave over his rooms in the "Corte Vecchia" to pope Pius II for the Council of Mantua in 1459 - that year, he commissioned Luca Fancelli to rebuild the castle as a palazzo rather than as a defensible castle. He also commissioned the frescoes of the castle Camera degli Sposi. In 1490 the castle became the site of the studiolo of Isabella d'Este, remaining there until she moved it to the "Corte Vecchia" in 1519-1522. In 1496 the condottiero Paolo Vitelli was captured by Francesco II and imprisoned in the castle. It remained the main Gonzaga residence for around a century until Guglielmo Gonzaga moved his apartments to the rebuilt "Corte Vecchia".

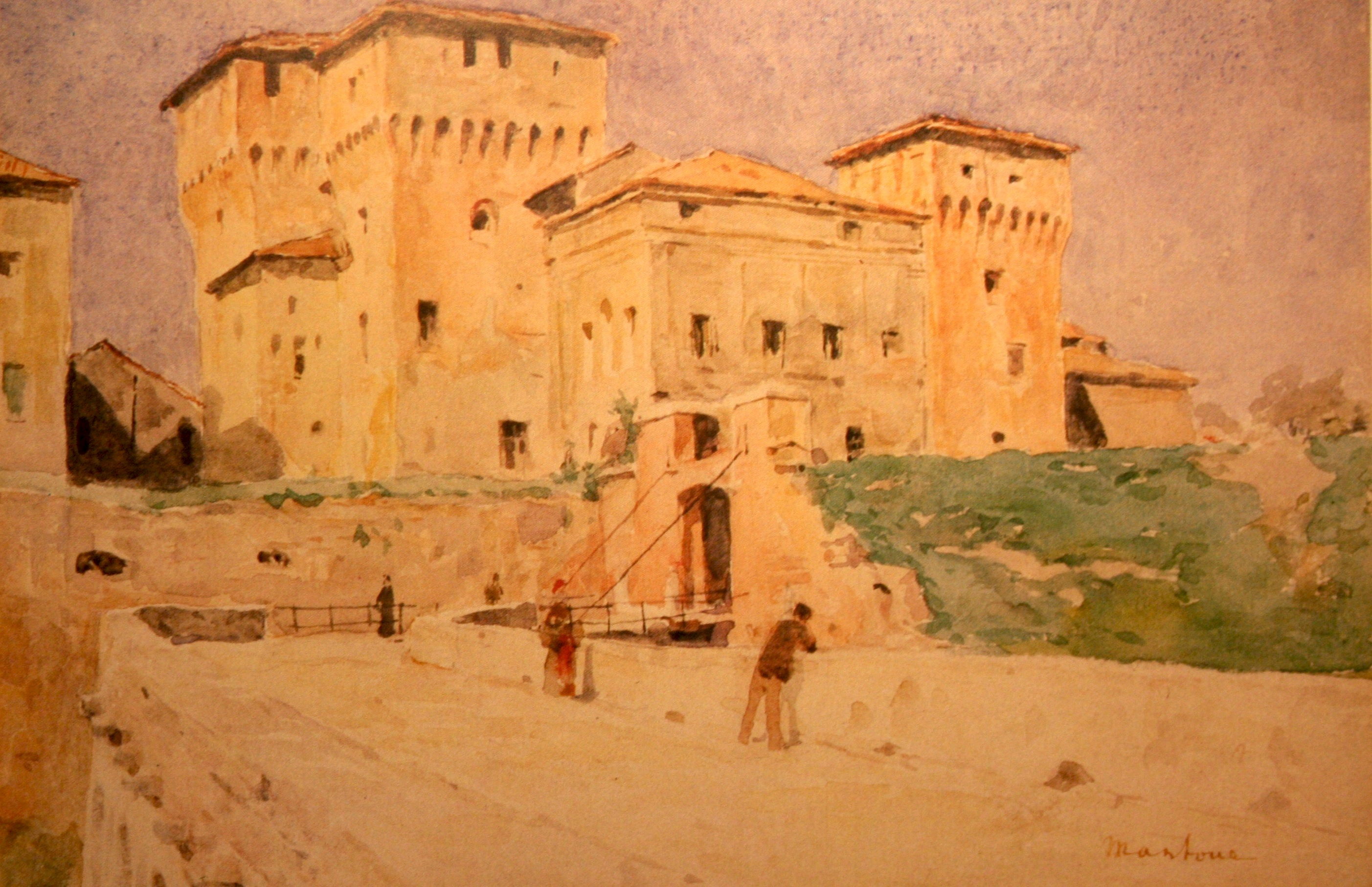
Painting of the Castello and the Palazzina della Paleologa in 1891.

In 1810 the Tyrolean fighter Andreas Hofer was imprisoned in the castle before his execution by the Kingdom of Italy. Mantua became part of the Austrian Empire in 1814 and from 1815 it was a maximum security prison for the Empire's political opponents, such as the Belfiore martyrs from 1852 onwards. Others pro-Risorgimento figures imprisoned there included Ciro Menotti and Teresa Arrivabene. The building's structure was damaged by the 2012 Emilia earthquake.

== Rooms ==
- Sala dei Soli, ground floor, contains 15th century frescoes, redesigned by Giulio Romano in 1531 and then by Giovan Battista Bertani
- Sala degli Stemmi, accessed by a spiral staircase
- Salone degli Affreschi, parallel to the Sala degli Stemmi
- Sala delle Sigle, bridal suite of Isabella d'Este
- Saletta della Grotta, part of Isabella's apartments
- Sala delle Armi, with twelve heraldic devices by Giulio Romano
- Chapel, built in 1563 by Bertani
- Sala di Mezzo
- Sala del Fregio
- Sala delle Cappe, with barrel vaulted ceiling
- Sala dello Zodiaco, with the remains of paintings by Giulio Romano, the room used to house Pietro Frattini, one of the Belfiore martyrs, and Ciro Menotti
- Camera degli Sposi.
- Scalone di Enea, designed by Bertani in 1549, just after his appointment as "Prefect of the Ducal Buildings" by cardinal Ercole Gonzaga, directly connects the castle's courtyard and loggiato with the Salone di Manto in the Ducal Palace
- Courtyard and loggiato, designed by Fancelli in 1472 to designs by Andrea Mantegna

== Bibliography ==
- (in Italian) Maria Rosa Palvarini, Carlo Perogalli, Castelli dei Gonzaga, Milano, 1983.
- (in Italian) Alberto Garlandini, I castelli della Lombardia, Milano, 1991.
- (in Italian) Touring Club Italiano (ed.), Lombardia. Guide d'Italia, Milano, 1970.
