= Santa Maria di Capo di Bove =

Demolished church in Mantua, Italy

Santa Maria di Capo di Bove (literally St Mary's at the Ox's Head) was a Romanesque church in Mantua, located near the porta di San Giorgio at the outer limits of the old city. Francesco I Gonzaga had it demolished in 1395 by permission of pope Boniface IX to build his Castello di San Giorgio.
