= Enrico Tazzoli (priest) =

Italian patriot and priest, the best known of the Belfiore martyrs

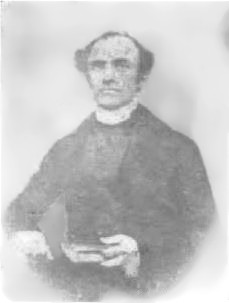
- Photograph of Tazzoli taken around 1850
- Born: 19 April 1812; Canneto sull'Oglio
- Died: 7 December 1852 (aged 40); Mantua
- Occupation: Priest
- Known for: Belfiore Martyr

Enrico Tazzoli (19 April 1812 - 7 December 1852) was an Italian patriot and priest, the best known of the Belfiore martyrs.

== Early years ==
Enrico Tazzoli was born in Canneto sull'Oglio on 19 April 1812, son of Pietro Tazzoli, justice of the peace and magistrate, and Isabella Arrivabene, of a noble family. His given names were Enrico Napoleone. In 1821 he was enrolled in the second class of the Goito secondary school, where he immediately began to show his inclination for the priestly life. Later he entered the seminary in Verona. He was ordained on 19 April 1835 by the bishop of Verona, since the Mantuan seat was vacant after the death of Giuseppe Maria Bozzi. In 1844 he published the "Book of the people" which denounced social inequality. Tazzoli became a professor of philosophy at the seminary of Mantua, and taught school. He was never a pastor. He lived with his mother near Mantua Cathedral in the Zuccaro district. (Note: Tazzoli's former house is on what is now Via Don Enrico Tazzoli)

Tazzoli was arrested the first time on 12 November 1848 for giving a sermon in Duomo against the tyrannical imperial powers who allowed the sack of Mantua of 1630, evidently an allusion to the imperial Austrians of his time. The arrest was ordered by the Captain Carl Pichler von Deeben, the same man who ordered Ugo Bassi shot in Bologna in 1849, and who in 1851 ordered the same fate for Giovanni Grioli. For the moment, however, the arrest was done only as a warning. In a search of the house he turned a blind eye to the tricolor scarf that was found among the books, but warned the priest's mother to burn the 5 giornate (5 days) of Ignazio Cantù and the poems of Giovanni Berchet. Don Enrico was then released, and on returning home found a large crowd applauding his courage and ideas.

== Conspiracy and arrest ==
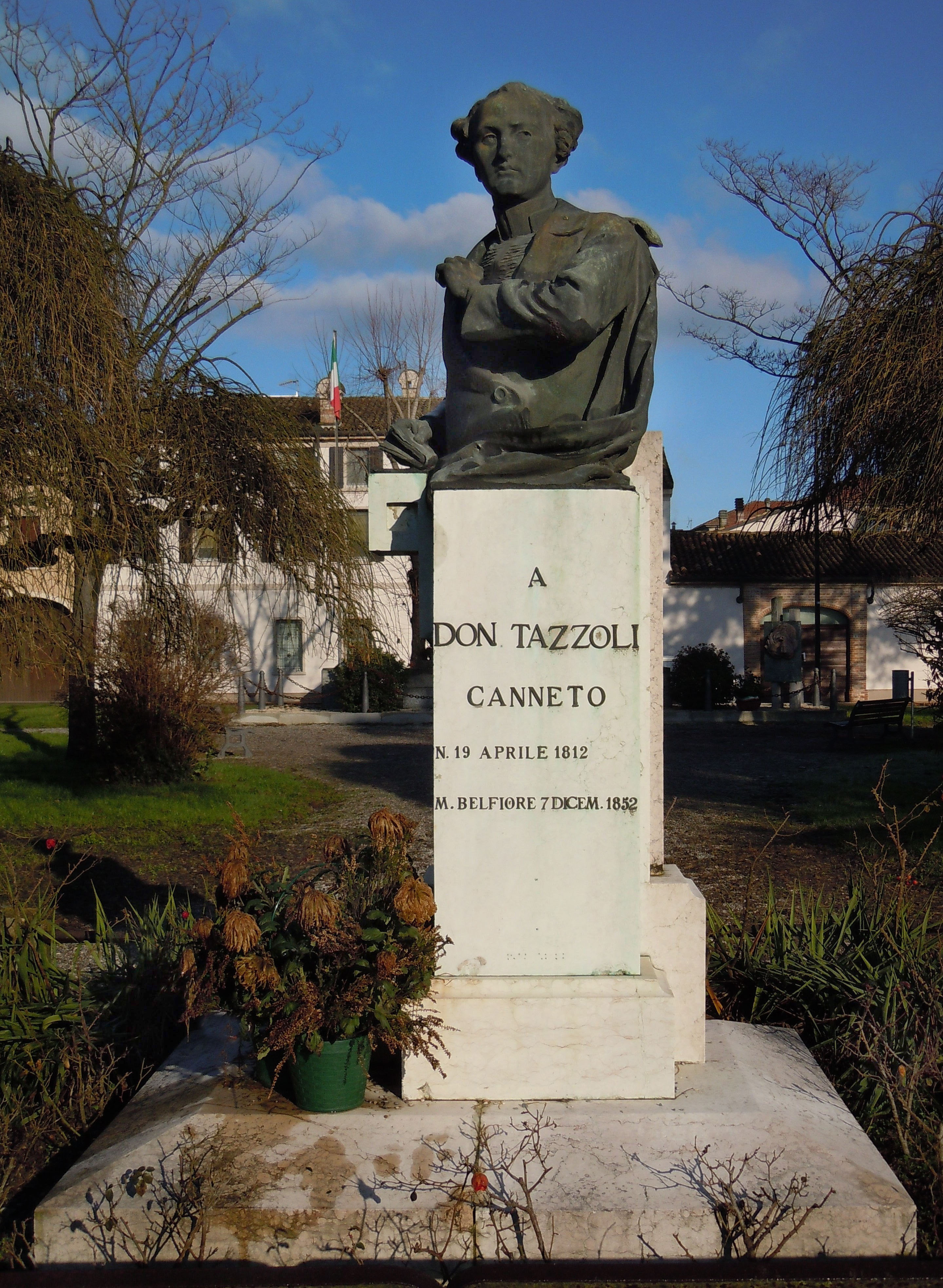
Monument at Canneto sull'Oglio

While Tazzoli did not share the religious vision of Giuseppe Mazzini, he became convinced that his Young Italy movement was the only one that had the membership and organization needed to take concrete action. Very involved in Catholic philanthropy and popular education, he married the "enlightened" principles of his Christianity with the humanitarian and "democratic" spirit of the Risorgimento to define his supreme love of country, his second religion.

On 2 November 1850, in a house at number 10 on the street in Mantua which is today called via Giovanni Chiassi, twenty Mantuans (Note: The twenty Mantuans were, in alphabetical order, Acerbi Giovanni, Borchetta Giuseppe, Borelli Giuseppe, Castellazzo Luigi, Chiassi Giovanni, Ferrari Aristide, Giacometti Vincenzo, Marchi Carlo, Mori Attilio, Pezzarossa Giuseppe, Poma Carlo, Quintavalle Giuseppe, Rossetti Giovanni, Sacchi Achille, Siliprandi Francesco, Suzzara Verdi Paride, Tassoni Dario, Tazzoli Enrico, Vettori Alessandro, Zanucchi Omero.) participated in the meeting which laid the foundation of an anti-Austrian insurrection plan. Don Enrico Tazzoli was the main organizer and coordinator of the conspiracy. He was also in contact with Mazzini, in exile in London, and was actively engaged in distributing Mazzini's leaflets. The Austrian police accidentally found some of these leaflets, and by using torture discovered the conspiracy. Don Enrico Tazzoli was arrested on 27 January 1852. Many documents were seized, including an encrypted register in which he noted receipts and expenses, with the names of members who had paid money. On 24 June, while in prison, Don Tazzoli learned that the Austrians had deciphered the key to understanding his book, which was based on his Pater Noster. Members from Mantua, Verona, Brescia and Venice were arrested.

== Death and aftermath ==
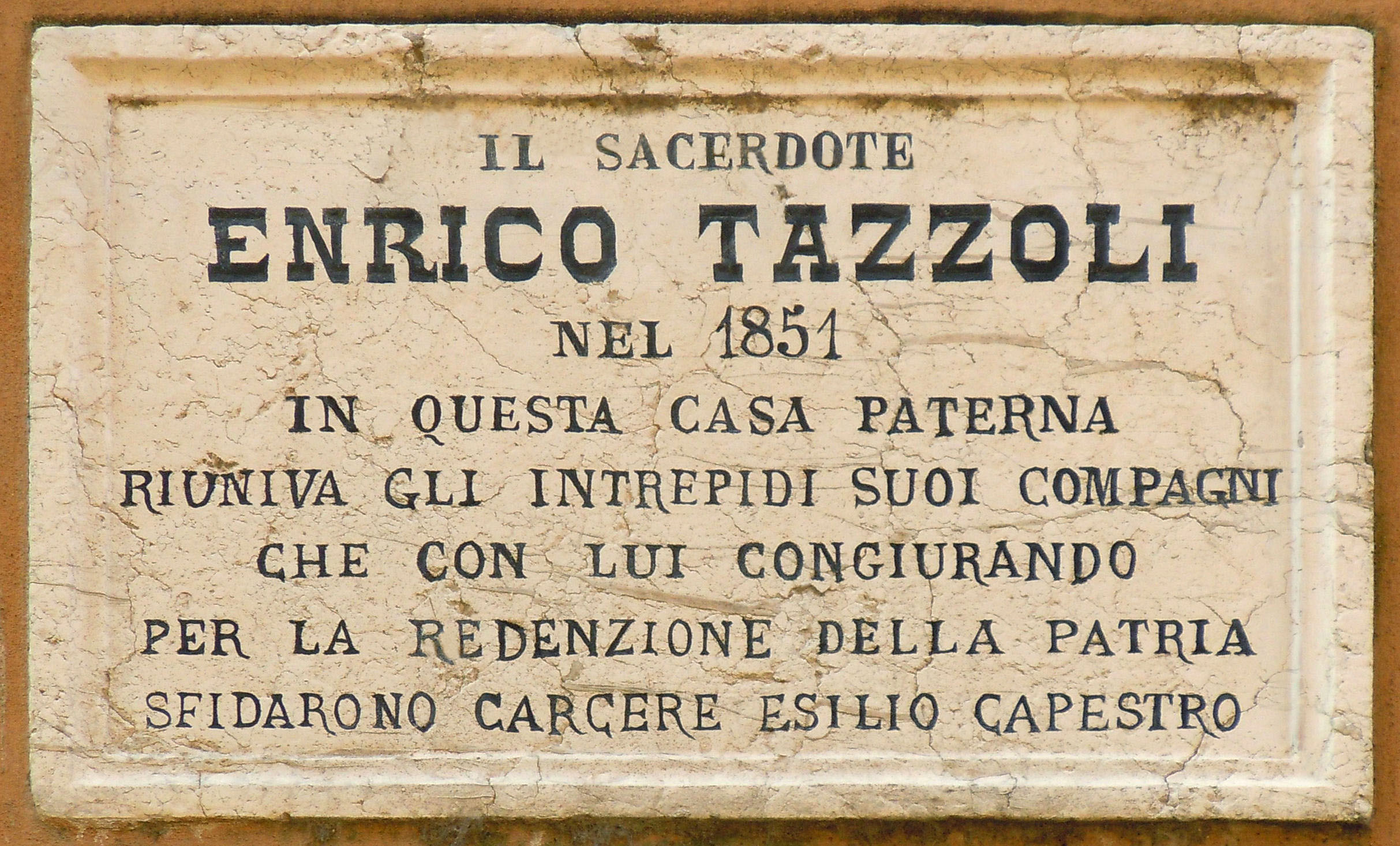
Mantua, plaque on Enrico Tazzoli's house

Shrewdly the Austrian authorities obtained a special order from Pope Pius IX, who overrode the bishop and ordered the defrocking of Enrico Tazzoli. This was done on 24 November. Monsignor Giovanni Corti was forced to read the formula of condemnation, remove the vestments and scrape with a knife the skin of the fingers that had held the host of the Eucharist. There now being no conflict with ecclesiastical law, on 4 December the Austrians gave the ten people who had been tried the judgment of the Austrian Council of War, which on 13 November had already decreed the death sentence.

The emotion aroused and the subsequent intervention of the Lombard religious authorities led the Governor General Josef Radetzky to commute some of the sentences to years in prison, but he upheld the death penalty for Tazzoli, Scarsellini, Poma, Canal and Zambelli. On 7 December 1852 the condemned men were executed by hanging in Belfiore, just outside the walls of the city of Mantua.

Twenty years after their martyrdom, 7 December 1872, Enrico Tazzoli was commemorated with the national premiere of the play by Riccardo Bonati "Enrico Tazzoli and the martyrs of 1852", presented at the Andreani theater of Mantua.

== Eponym submarine for Tazzoli (S 511) ==
USS Barb SS-220, a Gato-class submarine, was the first ship of the United States Navy to be named for the Barbus, a genus of ray-finned fish. After serving courageously in World War II for the United States, the submarine was loaned to the Italian Navy in 1954 and was renamed Enrico Tazzoli (S 511) by the Italian Navy, after Tazzoli.

The submarine was eventually sold for scrap in 1972 for approximately $100,000 (currently $770,000). Admiral Eugene B. Fluckey, the former American commander of the submarine on the last five of her 12 World War II patrols, noted that had the crew known of this, they would have bought the sub and brought her back to the United States to serve as a museum ship.

Previously, Italian submarine Enrico Tazzoli (1935), which was lost during a blockade-running mission between Europe and the Far East in May 1943, was also named after Tazzoli.

== Writings ==
- Scritti e memorie 1842-1852 (Writings and memoirs 1842-1852), Francoangeli, Milan, 1997
