= Tito Speri =

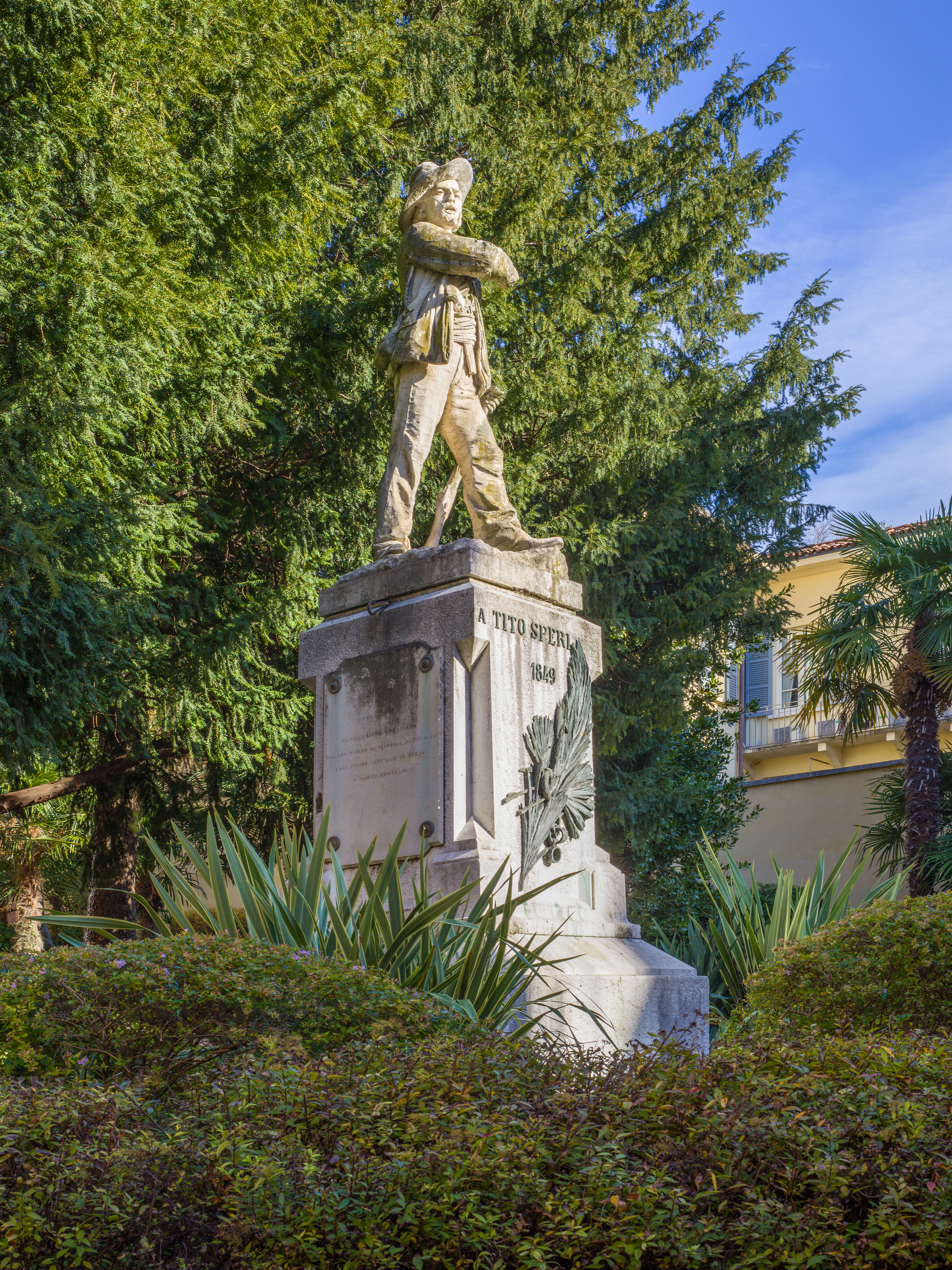
The Monument to Tito Speri at Brescia, formally inaugurated on its original site in Piazza Speri in Brescia on 1 September 1888

Tito Speri (2 August 1825 - 3 March 1853) was an Italian patriot and hero of the Risorgimento.

== Life ==
Speri was born in Brescia.

He began his military career as a volunteer in the First Italian Independence War in 1848, has been engaged in the Battle of Sclemo and after that war ended in an armistice he returned to Brescia, where he gave clandestine assistance to preparations for the Ten Days of Brescia in which the town earned the nickname of Leonessa d'Italia (Lioness of Italy). He then commanded the defence of Porta Torrelunga (what is now Piazza Arnaldo) and the square that now bears his name. The revolt broke out, profiting from the Austrian army's departure towards Piedmont, and ending on 1 April 1849.

Speri took part in several of its armed clashes and so, on the city's surrender, he took refuge in the Swiss Ticino at Lugano, en route to Turin to join the Mazzinian riots. He returned to Brescia shortly after an amnesty was declared, but his conspiratorial activities were discovered and he was arrested and hung within the Austrian Quadrilatero as one of the Belfiore martyrs.

He is buried in the Cimitero Monumentale of Brescia.
