= Luigi Dottesio =

Luigi Dottesio (14 January 1814 in Como – 11 October 1851 in Venice (then called Venezia)) was an Italian patriot who was very active in the distribution of anti-Austrian pamphlets, before and after 1848. Intercepted by the gendarmes in Maslianico while he was trying to illegally cross the Swiss frontier, he was executed by Austrians in Venezia, in 1851.

== First years ==
He was born in Como on 15 January 1814, and his parents were Carlo and Antonietta Casartelli. The modest conditions of his family, belonging to lower-middle class, allowed him to attend only the first classes of elementary school. However, he managed to get a good education, improved by the chance to study Dutch on a free course, which took place in the former Imperial Regio Liceo, the current Liceo Classico A. Volta in Como.

== Sources ==
- The information in this article is based on that in its Italian equivalent.
