= Battle of Novara (1849) =

Battle during the First Italian War of Independence

- Part of the First Italian War of Independence
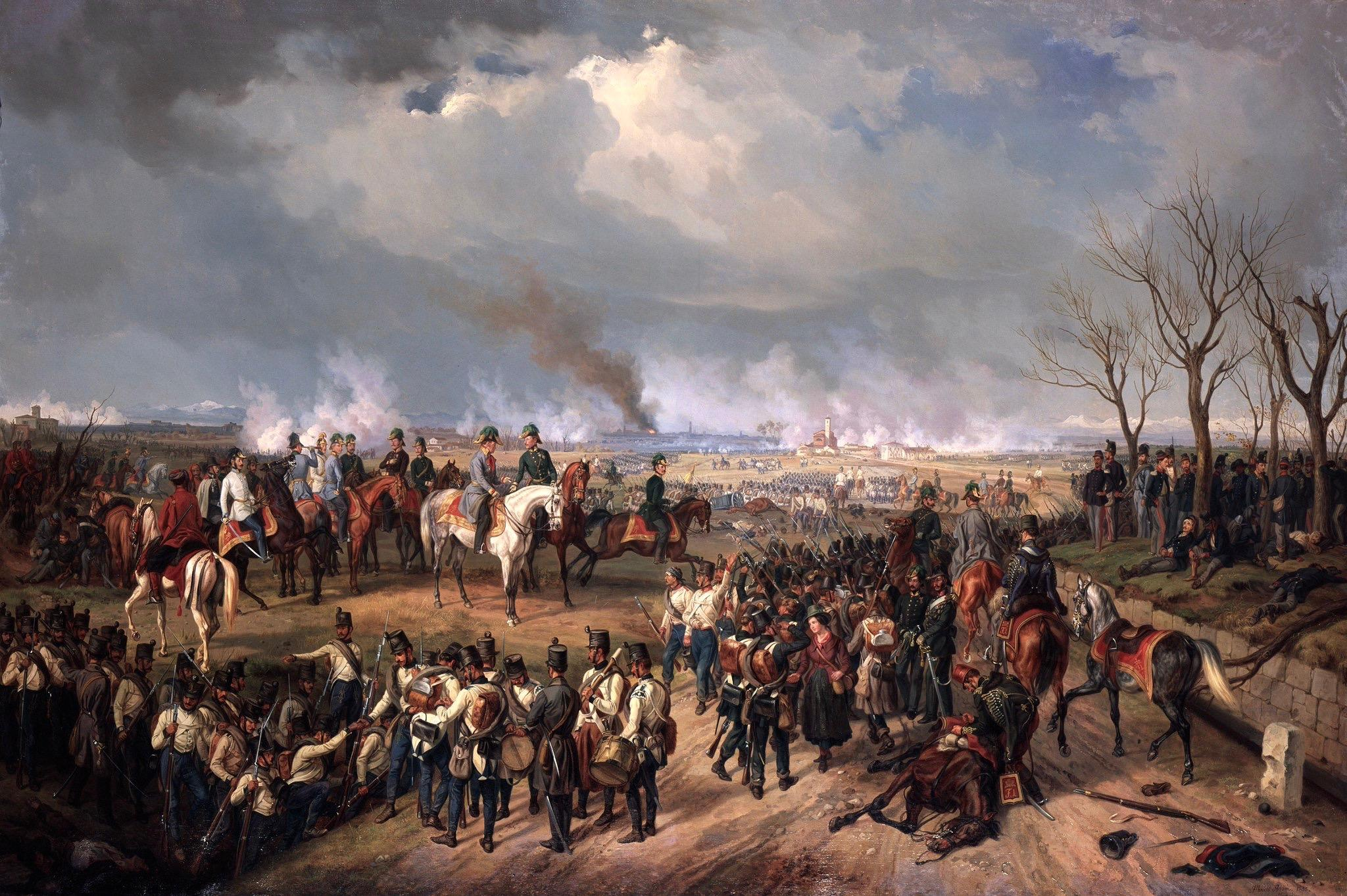
- Field Marshal Radetzky and his staff at the Battle of Novara on March 23, 1849; Albrecht Adam, 1855
Date	23 March 1849
Location	Novara, Kingdom of Sardinia (present-day Italy) 45°25′53″N 8°42′58″E
Result	Austrian victory: Abdication of Charles Albert

Belligerents
(Kingdom of Sardinia) Sardinia	(Austrian Empire) Austria

Commanders and leaders
Wojciech Chrzanowski	Joseph Radetzky

Strength
45,000 to 59,000	41,000 to 70,000

Casualties and losses
5,946: 1,378 killed 2,181 wounded 2,387 captured (Note: According to Michael Embree's Radetzky's Marches: The Campaigns of 1848-1849 in Upper Italy, the total number of killed was around 1,000 to 1,100, total number of wounded being rescued from the Novara battlefield and treated was 3,008, total number of missing or captured was around 2,000)	2,657: 466 killed 1,670 wounded 521 missing or captured (Note: According to Michael Embree's Radetzky's Marches: The Campaigns of 1848-1849 in Upper Italy, the total number of killed was between 410 and 797, total number of wounded being rescued from the Novara battlefield and treated was 1,850, total number of missing or captured was around 957)

The Battle of Novara (or Battle of Bicocca; Bicocca being a borough of Novara) was one of the battles fought between the Austrian Empire and the Kingdom of Sardinia during the First Italian War of Independence, within the era of Italian unification. Lasting the whole day of 22 March 1849 and ending at dawn on 23 March, it resulted in a severe defeat and retreat of the Piedmontese (Sardinian) army.

== Overview ==
An uneasy armistice made in 1848 between Austria and Sardinia lasted less than seven months, before Charles Albert, King of Sardinia, denounced the truce on 12 March 1849. The Austrian army took the military initiative in Lombardy. Under the command of Field Marshal Joseph Radetzky von Radetz, it seized the fortress town of Mortara.

The seizure of Mortara led to a battle between Austrian and Piedmontese troops at Novara, 28 miles (45 km) west of Milan. Austrian forces (estimates vary from 41,000 to 70,000 tropps) thoroughly routed their Piedmontese opponents (estimates vary from 45,000 to 59,000 troops) as they had at the Battle of Custoza the previous year. Piedmont also suffered from a lack of support from the smaller Italian states. General Girolamo Ramorino was accused of disobeying orders before the Battle of Novara, and, that same year, he was executed.

The Piedmontese were driven back to Borgomanero at the foot of the Alps, and the Austrian forces occupied Novara, Vercelli and Trino, with the road to the Piedmontese capital, Turin, lying open to them.

== Aftermath ==
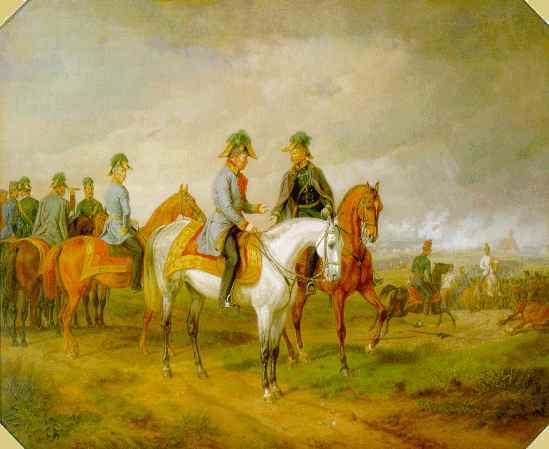
Albrecht Adam, Die Schlacht bei Novarra (The Battle of Novara), 1858

Austrian general Baron Julius von Haynau subdued Brescia, 54 miles NE of Milan, and Charles Albert abdicated in favor of his son Victor Emmanuel, who would later become the first king of a unified Italy. Friedrich Engels wrote "that, after this defeat, a revolution and proclamation of a republic in Turin is expected, arises from the fact that the attempt is being made to prevent it by the abdication of Charles Albert in favour of his eldest son." A Piedmontese Republic was not created, though a Roman Republic had already been proclaimed in February, and there existed a Venetian Republic as well. Charles Albert exiled himself to Porto, Portugal, and died shortly thereafter.

A peace treaty was signed on 9 August. Piedmont was forced to pay an indemnity of 65 million francs to Austria. A reenactment of the battle occurs every year. The Austrian frigate Novara, which went on a round-the-world scientific expedition between 1857 and 1859, was named after this Austrian victory.
