= Ten Days of Brescia =

1849 battle of the First Italian War of Independence

Siege of Brescia Ten Days of Brescia
- Part of the First Italian War of Independence
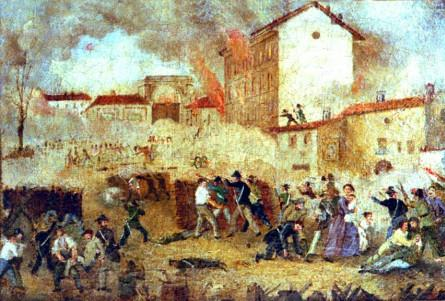
- Episode from the Ten Days of Brescia in 1849
Date	23 March – 1 April 1849
Location	Brescia, Lombardy
Result	Capitulation of Brescia

Belligerents
Brescia	Austrian Empire

Commanders and leaders
Tito Speri; Giuseppe Martinengo; Pietro Boifava	Julius von Haynau; Field marshal Johann Graf Nugent †; Major general

Strength
Numerous barricades armed insurgents: 2,000–3,000	Austrian garrison: 4 companies & 30 guns Nugent Brigade: 2,300 infantry & cavalry 4 guns 30-pound Mörser-Batterie

Casualties and losses
c. 1,000 killed including civilians 16 executed	31 March and 1 April: 53 KIA including 3 officers 209 wounded including 13 officers 54 MIA

The Ten Days of Brescia (Italian: Dieci giornate di Brescia) was a revolt which broke out on 23 March 1849 in the Italian city of Brescia, then part of the Kingdom of Lombardy–Venetia, a Crown land of the Austrian Empire.

The revolt, headed by the patriot Tito Speri, began on the same day as the Battle of Novara ended (though news of Austria's victory there had not yet reached Brescia) and ended on 1 April after 10 days of fierce fighting with the Austrian forces. In spite of the loss of the Italian rebels, their bravery earned the city the surname of Leonessa d'Italia (Lioness of Italy).

The Austrian troops, under General Nugent, were initially surprised and retired to the castle, from which they heavily cannonaded the city, damaging many of Brescia's historical monuments. A total encirclement of Brescia was established by the Austrians beginning on the 8th day of the revolt, when reinforcements arrived. The following day General Haynau, later nicknamed "The Hyena of Brescia", came and demanded the unconditioned surrender of the Bresciani. As the latter refused, the fighting continued until late night, when the heads of the revolt decided to surrender. The following day (April 1), however, the Austrian troops sacked the city and massacred numerous inhabitants before the surrender could be signed.

Some 1,000 citizens were killed during the battle. Although it ultimately ended in defeat, the revolt was lauded in a composition by the Italian poet Aleardo Aleardi, who in 1857 depicted Brescia as Leonessa d'Italia (Italian for: "Lioness of Italy") for its fierce resistance and its will to not give up in front of a better armed opponent; the expression then became widespread thanks to Giosuè Carducci who reprised it in one of his most famous works, Odi barbare (1877).

== See also ==
- Risorgimento
- Battle of Novara (1849)
