= Giovanni Acerbi =

Italian politician and soldier

General Giovanni Acerbi
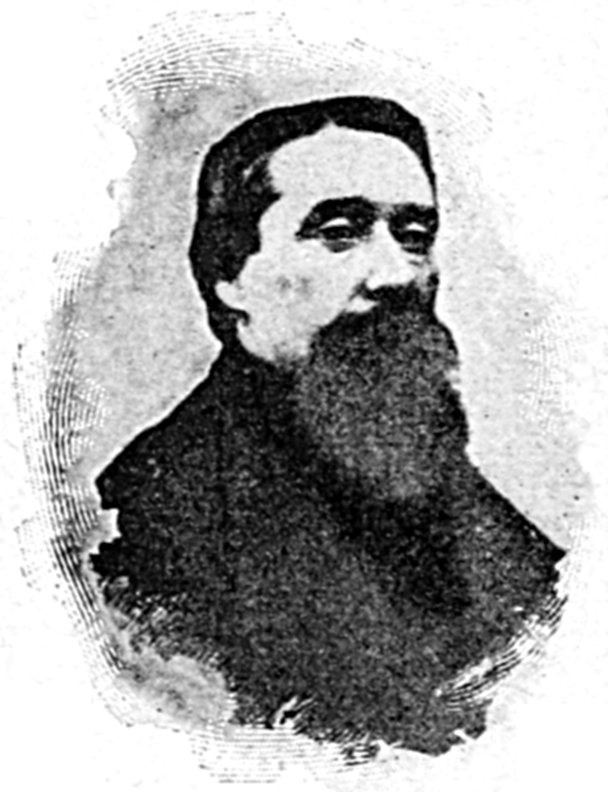

Deputie of the Kingdom of Italy

Personal details
- Born: Giovanni Acerbi; 14 November 1825 Castel Goffredo
- Died: 4 September 1869 (aged 43) Florence
- Party: Historical Left

Military service
- Allegiance: Kingdom of Sardinia; Kingdom of Italy
- Branch/service: Royal Sardinian Army; Royal Italian Army
- Years of service: active: 1859-1867
- Rank: Intendant General
- Unit: Red Shirts
- Battles/wars: Italian Wars of Independence (1848-1866)

Giovanni Acerbi (14 November 1825, Castel Goffredo - 4 September 1869, Florence) was an Italian soldier, politician and supporter of Risorgimento.
