= Luigi Castellazzo =

Luigi Castellazzo (29 September 1827 – 16 December 1890) was an Italian lawyer, politician, writer and supporter of Italian unification, federalism and the Historical Far Left.

Castellazzo was born in Pavia. He fought for Giuseppe Garibaldi, who praised him, though others have criticised him for his 1852 confession to the Austrian police, which was used as the main evidence against the Belfiore martyrs. He was a deputy from 1882 to 1886. He died in Pistoia, aged 63.
