= The Strauss Dynasty =

- Directed by: Marvin J. Chomsky
- Screenplay by: Zdenek Mahler
- Produced by: Kurt J. Mrkwicka, Werner Swossil
- Cinematography: Gérard Vandenberg
- Edited by: Petra von Oelffen
- Music by: Laurence Rosenthal
- Release date: 1991
- Running time: 606 minutes
- Country: Austria
- Languages: English, German

The Strauss Dynasty (German: Die Strauß-Dynastie) is an Austrian biographical film in six parts from 1991. It depicts the careers of Johann Strauss (father), the composer of the Radetzky March, and his son Johann Strauss (son) ("Schani"), the composer of the waltz The Blue Danube, who, despite his father's resistance, also became a musician and competed with his father as a waltz composer.

It was broadcast in Austria by ORF III, in Germany by ZDF and in Italy by RAI.

== Plot ==
=== First part ===
Johann Strauss befriends Joseph Lanner at one of his concerts. The superficial dance music of the aristocratic balls gives Johann Strauss the idea of founding an orchestra with Lanner.

Both of them immediately get a job with the inn owner Streim. While his daughter Anna flirts with Strauss and Lanner at the same time, the businessman Karl Friedrich Hirsch convince the two musicians to play music in parallel in Streim's inn and in other places.

Anna becomes pregnant and marries Strauss; at the wedding Lanner breaks away from Strauss. Despite his professional success, Strauss is plagued by fears about the future. When Anna gives birth to their son Johann ("Schani"), Strauss prefers to play with the Italian violinist Niccolò Paganini, who has shown enthusiasm for his music.

Little Schani develops his first musical inclinations, while his father becomes soon more successful than Lanner, despite the last one is appointed music director to the imperial court. During a cholera epidemic, Strauss plans with Hirsch a concert in Schönbrunn to draw the emperor's attention to his music. Despite his absence, the concert is a success and Strauss chooses a waltz queen from the audience, the young Emilie Trampusch. The troops of the emperor dissolve the concert due to health concerns, even with the use of force; in their escape, Strauss and Emilie kiss.

Prince Metternich summons Strauss at court and sent him on a concert tour to England for the coronation of Queen Victoria. In return, he promises Strauss that he would find a post at the imperial court for him when he is back in Vienna.

=== Second part ===
Because his lover Emilie Trampusch gives birth to a son, Strauss decides, despite the homesickness of his orchestra, to prolong his concert tour to France. When he prospects to continue the journey to New York, Strauss is abandoned by his musicians.

Resigned, Strauss and Hirsch return to Vienna, where Strauss sees his grown-up son Schani and his brothers again. Strauss is unable to work, while Anna does not know how to support her family. Frustrated, Strauss forbids his sons to become musicians in order to spare them the disappointments he had to experience himself. When the musicians of his previous orchestra return to Strauss, at Anna's insistence he start working again.

Strauss moves in with Emilie and agrees to pay Anna's family maintenance only if his sons abide by his music ban. For this reason, Schani attends business school, but, with the support of his mother, secretly turns back to music. Moreover, he falls in love with Lanner's daughter Kathi, who arranges for him violin lessons with her father. After Johann Strauss finds out about the lessons, Anna forbids any further interference from her husband and sends her son to take composition lessons with the organist Joseph Drechsler; Schani earns the necessary money at night working in a factory. However, Schani does not enjoy Drechslers' lessons on fugues and would rather, contrary to his mother's plans, compose waltzes and set up an orchestra with his friend Gustav Levi.

Lanner dies unexpectedly; due to Prince Metternich's influence, Strauss becomes his successor as music director to the imperial court.

After initial difficulties, Schani gets permission to found an orchestra with the help of his mother, who de facto signs as his guardian. Although Johann Strauss threatens to boycott all café owners who let Schani play with them, Schani celebrates a successful debut at Café Dommayer. Johann Strauss congratulates his son and offers him a tour together; Schani's mother, however, vehemently refuses.

=== Third part ===
Prince Metternich worries about public order because of the rivalry between father and son. When a young woman dies in a dispute between the supporters of father and son, Schani plays at her funeral despite the official prohibition. Prince Metternich urges Strauss to end the conflict with his son, but then, at Hirsch's suggestion, sends Schani as a cultural ambassador to Romania.

The rebels of the revolution of 1848 celebrate Schani as a hero because he opposed the authorities at the funeral; he plays for them the Marseillaise. After his return to Vienna, Schani reports to the revolutionary army. While Field Marshal Radetzky crushes the rebels, Schani and Levi are arrested for participating in the revolution. Prince Metternich is deposed and Emperor Ferdinand I abdicates; his successor is his nephew Franz Joseph I.

Escaping from the revolution with other upper-class citizens, Johann Strauss has an affair with the singer Jetty Treffz, the lover of the banker Moritz von Todesco; when he returns to Vienna, he performs the Radetzky March in Radetzky's honour. While Anna is campaigning for Schani's release, Johann Strauss falls ill with scarlet fever. Schani is allowed to visit his terminally ill father, but comes too late: Emilie Trampusch has gone and has left Johann Strauss's naked body in the house.

After his funeral, Schani reunites his orchestra with that of his father. A little later he falls in love with Karoline, who however is starting a relationship with Schani's brother Josef. When his application for music director to the imperial court is rejected, he reluctantly goes on a tour at the urging of his mother. The Russian Prince Alexander Nikolajewitsch Gribow gives him the opportunity to play in Russia for the Tsar.

=== Fourth part ===
Johann Strauss writes in his letters to his mother how successful his music is in Russia and how popular he is with women - he already lives in a liaison with the aristocratic daughter Olga Wassiljewna Smirnitskaja - but also reports on the darker side of the raging Crimean War in Russia. A little later he is awarded the Order of St. Stanislaus by the Tsar.

Olga's parents, on the other hand, try to prevent their daughter's not appropriate relationship with Johann. When he secretly arranges to take Olga with him to Austria, she tries, driven by inner voices, to shoot herself and Strauss; however, Strauss manages to flee. The Tsar promises that Olga will be taken care of; Strauss returns to Vienna, where, thanks to his success, he gives one concert after another.

When Strauss has to go to the sanatorium for three months because of overwork, his brother Josef - who works as an engineer - replaces Johann as music director at the insistence of his mother. Since Johann's stay in the sanatorium results in a lack of new waltzes, Josef begins to compose; a little later their brother Eduard turns to music as well. When Josef also collapses due to overwork, Eduard takes over the orchestra.

Johann and Jetty Treffz begin a relationship and get married, despite protests from Johann's mother, who considers Jetty a bad wife. Shortly after the wedding, Johann is appointed music director to the imperial court. Anna Strauss reacts in horror when Johann wants to devote himself exclusively to composing.

=== Fifth part ===
While the Strauss brothers quarrel over contract negotiations and Johann's choice of spouse, Austria experiences a defeat in the Austro-Prussian War in 1866. Johann is given by police inspector Joseph Weyl the task of setting a poem to music to lighten the mood in the population. While Johann despairs of the silly text, Levi becomes his publisher.

Since Josef is in financial difficulties, Johann offer him the chance to go on a concert tour to Russia with some of his musicians. When Johann takes the rest of the orchestra to France, Eduard reacts angrily that there are no musicians left for him. Johann celebrates a success in Paris at the 1867 Exposition Universelle when he performs his music transposition of the poem, the waltz The Blue Danube, without text.

Since Johann reacts cautiously to an offer from the impresario Charles Gilmore to host an American tour, Jetty informs him only when they are in America that he had received a telegram in France with the news of his mother's death. Johann is shocked by her approach.

In Vienna, his joy over being awarded the Salvator Medal and the sale of a million copies of The Blue Danube is overshadowed by the cancer death of his brother Josef; on the deathbed Eduard accuses Johann of having caused Josef's death during the trip to Russia.

Jetty tries several times to encourage Johann to write operettas; only when Eva Wesseli, a singer at the theater, presents Johann with a libretto, Johann decides to compose Die Fledermaus. Jetty is jealous when an affair develops between Johann and Eva.

The great success of Die Fledermaus is overshadowed by allegations that Johann published an unknown work by his deceased brother as his own. His marriage is also threatened with disaster when Jetty's grown-up son shows up and demands payment of his gambling debts; otherwise he threatens to expose public that he is the son of Johann Strauss (father).

In the meantime, Johann meets Johannes Brahms, who as a music expert offers to publicly refute the plagiarism allegations against Johann, since his cheerful music is completely different from that of the calculating engineer Josef Strauss. His joy about such meeting is immediately spoiled by Jetty's suicide; through a letter from her he learns the truth about her son.

=== Sixth part ===
Shortly after Jetty's death, Strauss marries the actress Angelika Dittrich. She quickly dilapidates her husband's money and her attempt to surprise her husband with daring, self-painted pictures fails miserably. During an argument, Angelika miscarries; due to rumours that she was having an affair, Johann asks for a divorce and, on the advice of family lawyer Dr. Halmi, travels to Hungary. After Angelika does not consent to the divorce, Strauss finds legal help from Dr. Halmi's widowed daughter-in-law Adele, who has opened a law firm in Budapest. At a gypsy festival, a fortune teller predicts an imminent wedding between them.

After Angelika blocks Johann's accounts, Adele took over his financial affairs. Angelika insinuates a liaison between them, whereupon Dr. Halmi becomes her lawyer and dismisses Adele from his office. Despite Levi's request, Eduard refuses to help Johann financially by performing his music.

While working on his new operetta Der Zigeunerbaron, Johann converts to Protestantism and becomes a citizen of the German Duchy of Saxe-Coburg and Gotha in order to divorce Angelika and marry Adele; Eduard is his successor as music director to the imperial court.

Despite Johann's new citizenship, the Viennese respond enthusiastically to Der Zigeunerbaron. Johann's plan to publish a complete edition of his works fails because of Edward's refusal to hand over the music he has archived. On the occasion of the award of the Order of chivalry by Franz Joseph I, Johann dedicates his Kaiser-Waltz to the Emperor.

On June 3, 1899, Johann, sitting in an armchair, thinks back to his eventful life and dies. The musicians in Eduard's orchestra mournfully play The Blue Danube; Eduard himself runs back home and, crying, burns his archive in the fireplace.

== Cast ==
- Anthony Higgins: Johann Strauss (Father)
- Stephen McGann: Johann Strauss (Son) ("Schani")
- Lisa Harrow: Anna Strauss (née Streim), Johann's wife
- David Yelland: Joseph Lanner, Johann's friend and rival
- Vernon Dobtcheff: Karl Friedrich Hirsch, Johann's friend and impresario
- Anton Lesser: Gustav Levi, Schani's friend and impresario
- Edward Fox: Prince of Metternich
- Julia Stemberger: Emilie Trampusch ("Emmi"), Johann's lover
- Sophie Ward: Kathi, Lanner's daughter and Schani's first lover
- Emily Richard: Adele Deutsch, Schani's third wife
- Herwig Seeböck: Ferdinand Dommayer, owner of the café of Schani's debut
- John Gielgud: Joseph Drechsler, Schani's music teacher
- John Rhys-Davies: Alexander Nikolajewitsch Gribow, host of Schani in Russia
- Cherie Lunghi: Henrietta Treffz ("Jetty"), Johann's lover and then Schani's first wife
- Duncan Bell: Josef Strauss ("Pepi"), Schani's middle brother
- Adrian Lukis: Eduard Strauss ("Edi"), Schani's youngest brother
- Geoffrey Whitehead: Halmi, Strauss' family friend and lawyer
- Jane Arden: Karoline, Schani's lover and then Pepi's wife
- Paris Jefferson: Eva Wesseli, Schani's lover
- Emma Harbour: Angelika Dittrich ("Lili"), Schani's second wife
- Guido Wieland: Franz
- Alice Krige: Olga Wassiljewna Smirnitskaja, Schani's lover in Russia
- Peter Uray: Olga's father
- Krista Stadler: Olga's mother
- Colin Jeavons: Imperial Officer in the License office
- Hans Kraemmer: Musician
- Gideon Singer: Musician
- Julia Gschnitzer: Fortune teller in Budapest
- Vilma Degischer: Old dancer
- Franz Morak: Consul
- Ronald Lacey: Farmer
