= Cortina d'Ampezzo Town Hall =

- Municipio di Cortina d'Ampezzo (Italian)
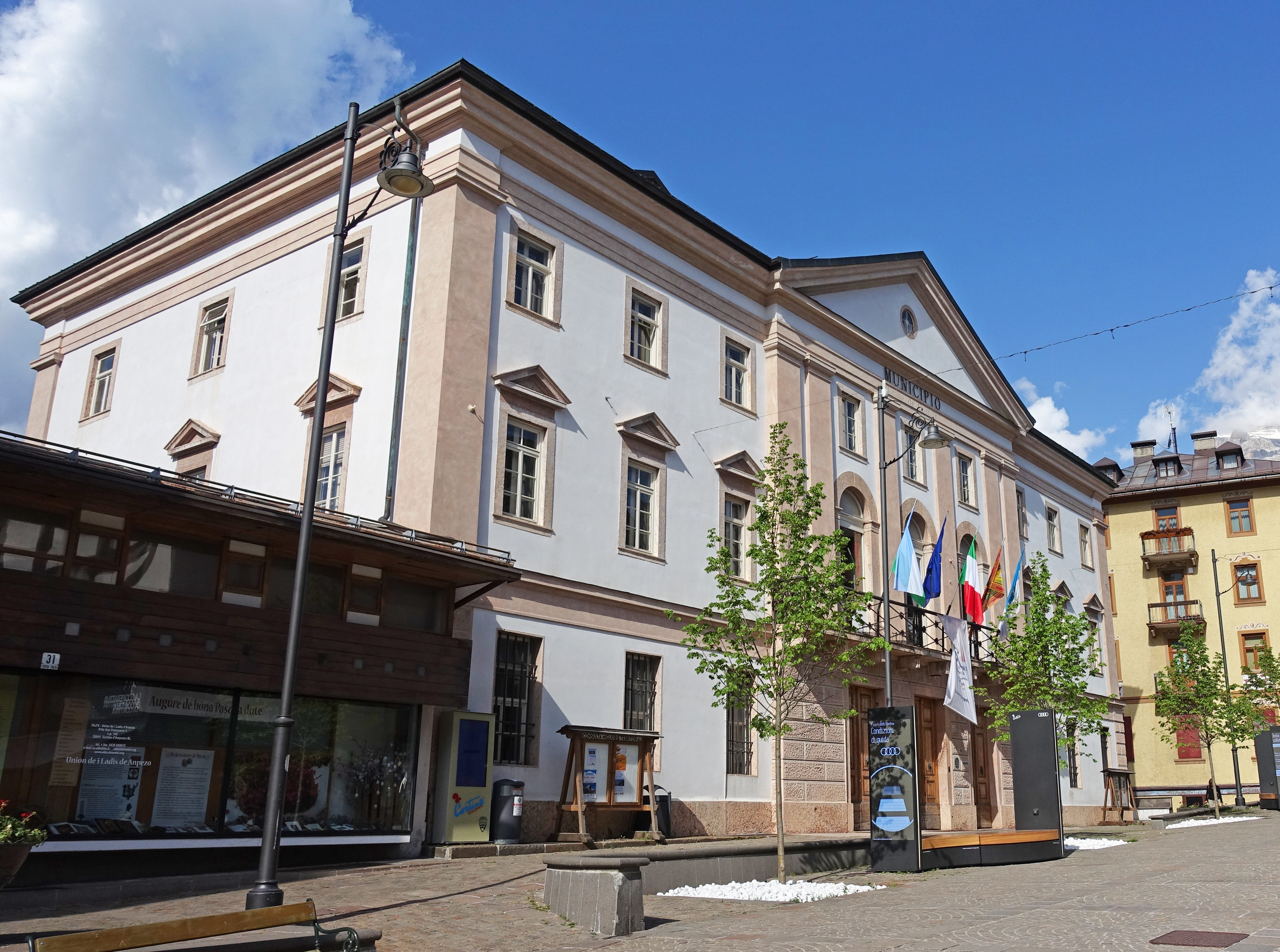
- Cortina d'Ampezzo Town Hall in 2019
- Click on the map for a fullscreen view

General information
- Location: Cortina d'Ampezzo, Italy
- Coordinates: 46°32′12.14″N 12°08′18.87″E

Cortina d'Ampezzo Town Hall (Italian: Municipio di Cortina d'Ampezzo) is the town hall of the town and comune of Cortina d'Ampezzo in Italy.

== History ==
The building was constructed in 1836 to house the town's administrative seat.

== Description ==
The building is located on Corso Italia, in the centre of Cortina. It has three levels and it features a neoclassical style and a symmetrical façade.

In the entrance hall of the building there are two cannons given to Cortina in 1851 by Radetzky, originally intended to be melted down to obtain the metal needed for the manufacture of the bells of the town's bell tower.
