= Mako Sajko =

Brazilian screenwriter and film director (1938–2022)

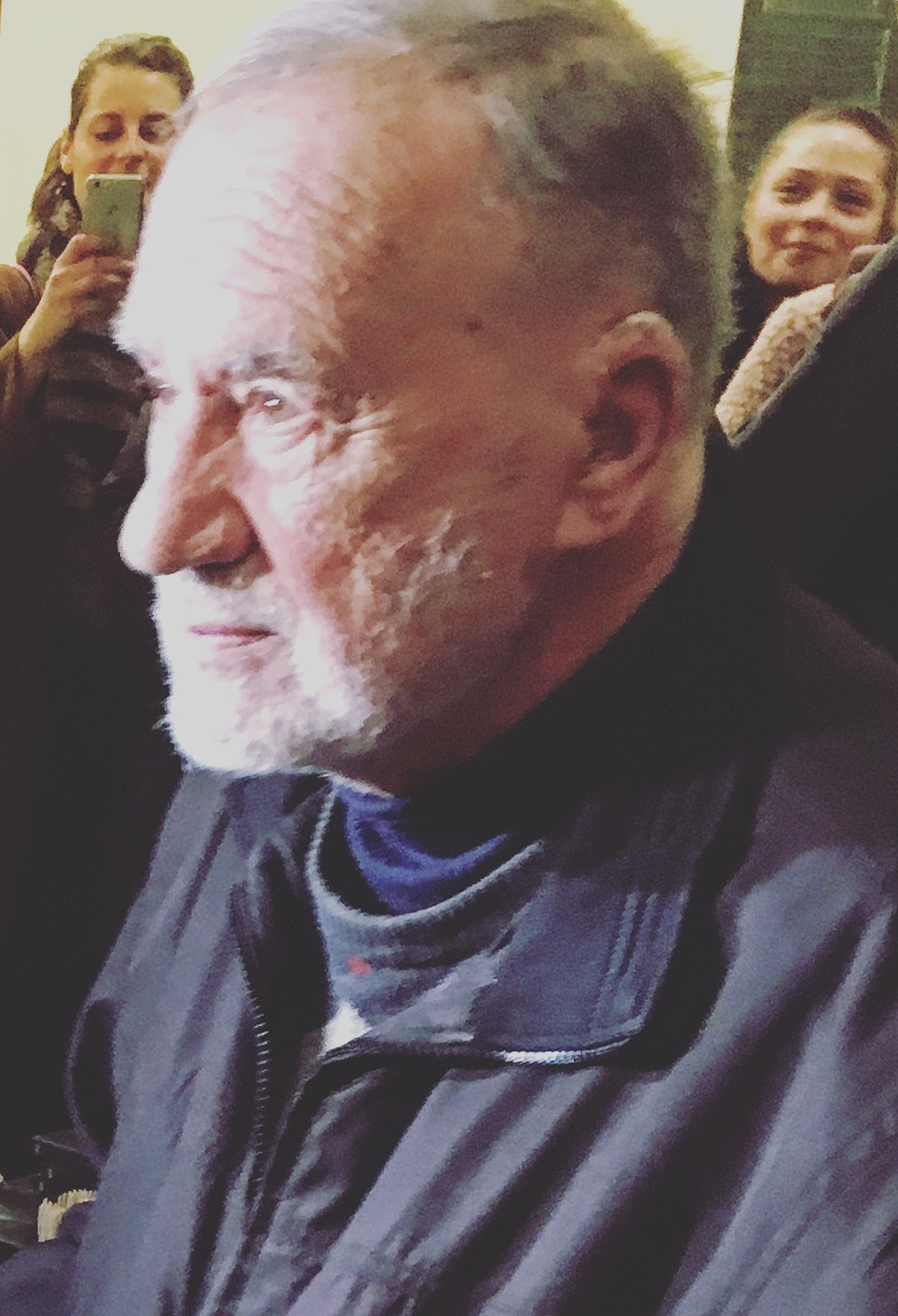
- Sajko in 2017
- Born: 19 January 1927; Tržič, Slovenia
- Died: 1 January 2023 (aged 95)
- Occupation: Filmmaker

Mako Sajko (19 January 1927 – 1 January 2023) was a Slovenian documentarist, screenwriter and film director.

== Life and career ==
Born on 19 January 1927 in Tržič, Sajko studied direction under Slavko Vorkapić at the High Film School in Belgrade, graduating in 1959 and becoming the first Slovenian film director with a formal degree in directing.

A socially committed filmmaker who had a peculiar interest to taboo themes such as industrial pollution or prostitution, he is best known for the documentary film Samomorilci, pozor! ("Suicides, Beware!", 1967), which in spite of getting several awards and critical acclaim enraged Yugoslav authorities because of the unwanted attention it placed on the numerous suicides among young people; the controversy resulted in the establishment of the first youth suicide prevention programmes but also in the banning of the film and in Sajko having reduced career opportunities such as being denied a feature film debut, and after the ban of his last documentary film (Narodna noša, "National Costume", 1975) he was forced to a premature retirement from cinema.

During his career Sajko received numerous awards and honours, notably the Prešeren Fund Award in 1969, the Badjura Lifetime Achievement Prize in 2009 and the France Štiglic Award for his career in 2021. He died on 1 January 2023, 18 days before his 96th birthday.
