= Friedrich Karl Gustav, Baron von Langenau =

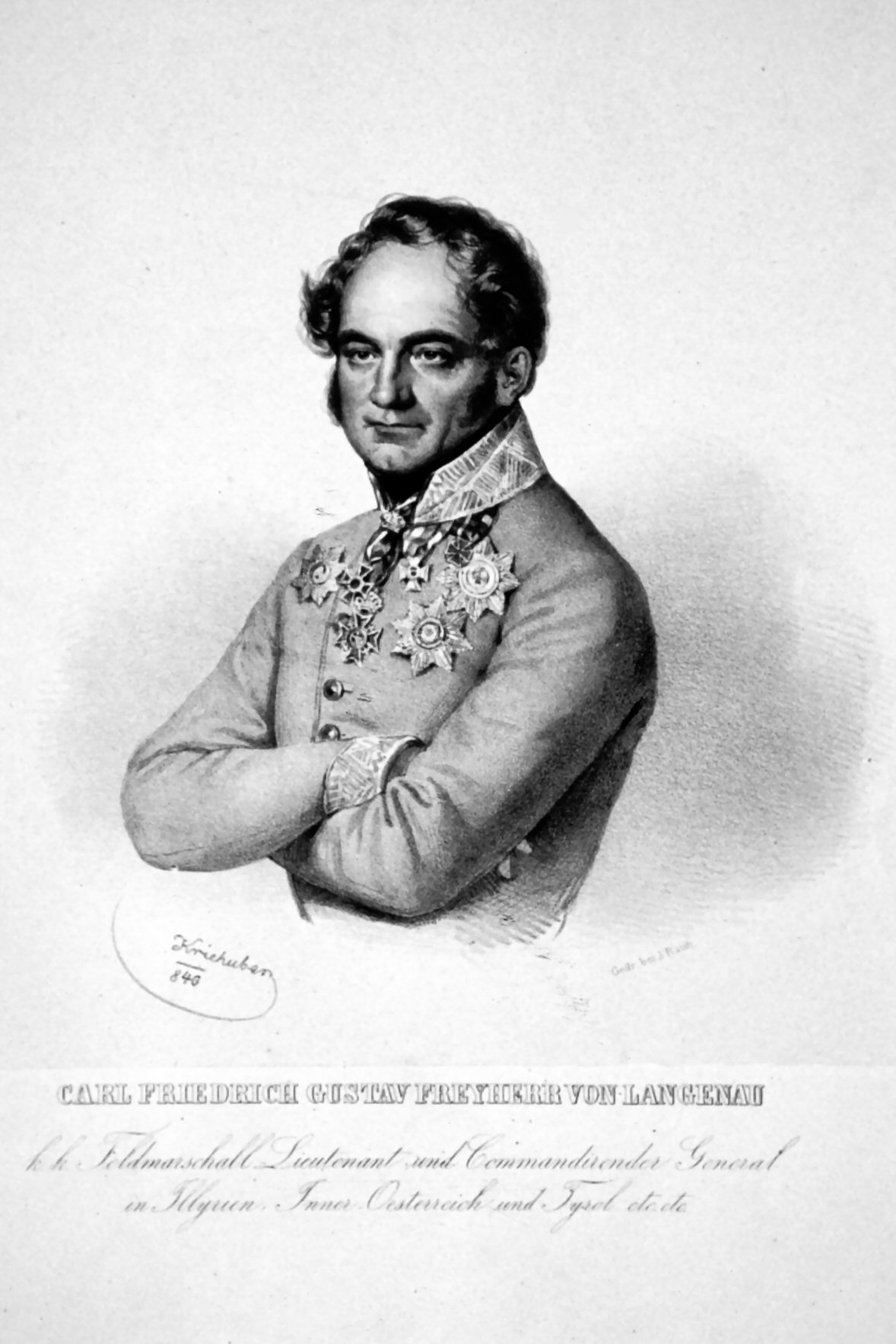
- Born: 7 November 1782; Dresden
- Died: 4 July 1840 (aged 57)
- Branch: Army of Bohemia; Austrian Army of the Upper Rhine
- Rank: Field Marshal Lieutenant
- Spouse: Sarah von Sturtz
- Other work: Chairman of the Military Central Commission of the German Federal Assembly

Friedrich Karl Gustav Freiherr von Langenau, Field Marshal Lieutenant, (7 November 1782, in Dresden – 4 July 1840 Gratz) was Quartermaster-General of the Army of Bohemia, in 1814, and Austrian Army of the Upper Rhine, under Schwarzenberg in 1815.

== Early life ==
He was the son of a Saxon lieutenant General, Gottlob Bernhard. He joined at the age of 13 years in the Saxon army, as a Unterleutnant, in the "Kurfürst" Infantry Regiment. He participated in the campaigns of 1796 to 1812, including the Battle of Saalfeld. Notably, in the Russian Campaign in 1812, he was head of the General Staff of the VII (Saxon) Corps. After the return of the Saxon Corps from Russia, the King appointed him Adjutant-General.

In 1813 he negotiated a treaty for mutual defence with Austria; but after the Battle of Lützen (1813), the king of Saxony returned to the French fold at Dresden. Langenau resigned and fought for Austria. On 27 July 1813, Langenau was Major General to the General Staff. At Dresden, 26 August 1813, he was successful taking command from the wounded Major General v. Frierenberger. In Leipzig, 16 October 1813, Feldm. Director-Lieut. Reisner gave direction to Langerau of the center and the left wing batteries, united at two points, and silenced the enemy guns. On 18 October Langerau was the first to pursue the withdrawal of the enemy from the Wachau Valley. Langerau commanded artillery in battles near Hochheim (on 9 November 1813). His service as Quartermaster-General of the Army of Bohemia, in 1814, and of the Rhine Army, in 1815, under Schwarzenberg, won him universal recognition. Joseph Radetzky von Radetz served under him in 1814.

Langernau in 1817, became a Brigadier General in Linz. In 1827 he was appointed Feldmarschall-Lieutenant and assumed command in Frankfurt. In 1835, he was appointed General in command, Illyria, Tyrol and intraday Austria, in which position he died at Gratz, Austria.

== Political ==
He was Austrian Plenipotentiary, and the Chairman of the Military Central Commission of the German Federal Assembly at Frankfurt am Main, from November 1818 to 1829.

== Family ==
He married Sarah von Sturtz.

== Awards ==
- Military Maria Theresian Order – KC: 1815
- Order of Leopold – CC: 10.1813
- Military Honor Cross 1813/14 (Army Cross 1813/14): ~ 1814
- Colonel-Proprietor of the Infantry Regiment N°49: 1824 – 04.07.1840
- I.R. Privy Councillor: 1833
- I.R. Chamberlain

=== France ===
Order of Military Merit – CC: 1816 Order of the Légion d'Honneur – KC: 1812

=== Hessen-Darmstadt ===
Order of Ludwig – GC: 1829

=== Prussia ===
Order of the Red Eagle 1st cl.: 1824

=== Russia ===
Order of St. Anne 1st cl.: 1813

=== Saxony ===
Military Order of St. Henry – CC: before 1829
