= Ivan Bobersky =

Ukrainian pedagogue (1873–1947)

- Іван Боберський
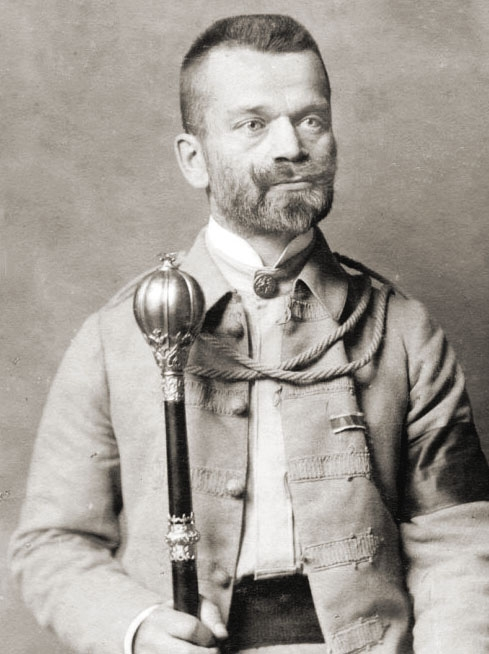
- Bobersky in 1912
- Born: 14 August 1873; Dobrohostiw, Galicia and Lodomeria, Austria-Hungary
- Died: 17 August 1947 (aged 74); Tržič, Yugoslavia
- Citizenship: Austria-Hungary; West Ukraine
- Education: University of Lviv
- Occupation: Teacher

Ivan Mykolayovych Bobersky (Note: Also Boberskyi in standard romanization) (Ukrainian: Іван Миколайович Боберський; 14 August 1873 – 17 August 1947), was a Ukrainian teacher and theorist who played a key role in promoting Ukrainian national physical culture.

== Life ==
Born into a Greek Catholic priest's family in Dobrohostiv village in the Galicia region, Bobersky graduated from the University of Lviv in 1895 and later pursued further studies at Graz University. In 1901, he became a lecturer at the Lviv Academic Gymnasium. He contributed significantly to the creation of Plast, the largest scouting organization in Ukraine, and was the one who coined its name. From 1906 to 1914, he served as chairman of the Sokil-Batko Society.

During World War I, Bobersky acted as the treasurer of the Ukrainian Sich Riflemen (1914–1918) and later headed the military press department of the State Secretariat of the West Ukrainian People's Republic (ZUNR). In 1920, he was appointed the plenipotentiary representative of the ZUNR government in the United States and Canada.

Bobersky was the first to introduce Ukrainian sports terminology, which was widely adopted in Western Ukraine and remained in use until 1939. From 1932, he resided in Tržič, Yugoslavia, where he lived until his death in 1947.
