= Francesca von Strassoldo Grafenberg =

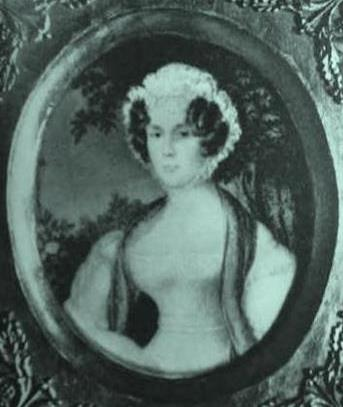
Francesca von Strassoldo Grafenberg

Francesca Romana von Strassoldo Grafenberg (3 January 1781 – 12 January 1854) was a Countess of Carniola in Slovenia.

== Life ==
She was born on 3 January 1781 in Tržič. She was born as the first of three children in a family of the soldier Leopold Lorenz Bartholomaeus von Strassoldo-Grafenberg, the Count of Carniola. She had two younger brothers, Michael and Julius.

In April 1798, she married the Bohemian nobleman and Austrian field marshal, Count Joseph Radetzky von Radetz. The couple lived together on Bohemian estate of Radetzky's in Třebnice (now a part of the town Sedlčany), in Vienna and in the former estate of Francesca's mother in Tržič until 1819. Then they moved to Milan, where they lived in Villa reale.

== Children ==
They had five sons and four daughters.

- Joseph (1799–1837)
- Franz Xaver (1800–1828)
- Karl Leopold (1804–1847)
- Theodor Constantin (1813–1878)
- Aloisie (Luisa) Anna Wenceslawa
- Francesca Romana Alexandra
- Frederika Romana
- Frederika Wilhelmina
- Anton (1817–1847)

She died on 12 January 1854.
