= Feliks Anton Dev =

- Born: Felix Antonius Dev; January 15, 1732; Tržič
- Died: November 7, 1786 (aged 54); Ljubljana
- Other names: Joannes Damascenus a nomine Mariae
- Occupations: poet, translator, editor

Feliks Anton Dev (January 15, 1732 – November 7, 1786; monastic name Joannes Damascenus a nomine Mariae, Slovenized as: Janez Damascen) was a Slovene poet, translator, and editor.

Poetry almanac edited by Dev

Dev was born in Tržič in 1732 and baptized Felix Antonius Dev. He studied at the Jesuit college in Ljubljana and then joined the Discalced Augustinians, where he took the monastic name Joannes Damascenus a nomine Mariae (John of Damascus in the name of Mary). He studied theology in Vienna, where he was ordained in 1755 and then taught philosophy and theology. He is considered the first secular poet in Slovene, and he edited the poetry almanac Piſanize od lepeh umetnost (Writings of Beautiful Art, 1779–1781). Dev died in Ljubljana.
