= Adrian Lukis =

British actor

- Born: Adrian Leonard Fellowes Lukis; 28 March 1957 (age 69); Birmingham, England
- Education: Drama Studio London
- Occupation: Actor
- Years active: 1984–present
- Spouse: Michele Costa (m. 1985, separated)

Adrian Leonard Fellowes Lukis (born 28 March 1957) is an English actor who has appeared regularly in British television drama since the late 1980s. Some of his most notable appearances have been as Sergeant Doug Wright in the police drama series The Bill and as Marc Thompson in the BBC legal drama Judge John Deed.

== Background ==
Lukis is descended from the Channel Islands archaeologist Frederick Lukis.

Lukis was educated at Mount House School (now known as Mount Kelly), in Tavistock, Devon and Wellington College.

== Career ==
Lukis had roles as a regular in the second series of Chandler & Co (1995), playing Mark Judd, and in Peak Practice (1997–1999), playing Dr. David Shearer. He played Mr. George Wickham in the BBC's 1995 adaptation of Jane Austen's Pride and Prejudice. He also appeared in ITV's one-off drama Back Home and in the BBC rural drama series Down to Earth.

He had previously appeared in The Casebook of Sherlock Holmes (as Bennett in The Creeping Man), Maigret, Miss Marple, Campion, The Strauss Dynasty and Prime Suspect. He played Simon Avery in Silent Witness, series 15, episode 2: Death Has No Dominion. For radio, he appeared as George Vavasour in BBC Radio 4's 2004 adaptation of Anthony Trollope's The Pallisers. He also appeared in a Midsomer Murders episode "Dead in the Water" (2004) as Phillip Trent, and in Silk as Patrick Stephens. In 2013, he played General Ravenscroft in an Agatha Christie's Poirot episode "Elephants Can Remember". He has narrated a number of books for the BBC and elsewhere, including Graham Greene's The Comedians for Penguin.

From 2013 to the present day, Lukis has played the recurring role of Colonel Blair Toast in the Channel 4 series Toast of London. In 2014, he appeared in another Midsomer Murders episode "The Killings of Copenhagen" as Julian Calder. In 2015, Lukis appeared as Francis Davison in the BBC TV series Death in Paradise "Damned If You Do" (episode 4.3), and as Laurence Olivier in the European premiere of the Austin Pendleton play Orson's Shadow at the Southwark Playhouse in London. In 2015, he appeared in Downton Abbey as Sir John Darnley.

In 2016, he appeared as Home Secretary Alex Wallis in "Hated in the Nation", an episode of the anthology series Black Mirror.

In September 2019, he reprised his role as George Wickham in the world premiere of Being Mr Wickham, a new play co-written with Catherine Curzon, and performed at the Old Georgian Theatre Royal in Bath as part of the Jane Austen Festival. In 2020, he appeared in Mae Martin's sitcom Feel Good, playing Mae's father.

In October 2022, Lukis starred in the BBC series SAS: Rogue Heroes playing General Claude Auchinleck.

== Filmography ==
=== Film ===
Year	Title	Role	Notes
1999	The Trench	Lt. Col. Villiers	
2001	Young Blades	Maréchal d'Ancre	
2001	Me Without You	Leo	
2005	7 Seconds	Vanderbrink	Direct-to-video film
2007	Nightwatching	Frans Banninck Cocq	
2009	Nine Miles Down	Dr. Leonard	
2009	Innocent	Bridges	
2011	Victim	Mr. Galsworthy	
2012	Bert & Dickie	Lord Burleigh	Also called: Going for Gold: The '48 Games
2012	City Slacker	Charles	
2012	Grey Wolf: Hitler's Escape to Argentina	Voiceover Artist (voice)	Film adaptation of the book "Grey Wolf: The Escape of Adolf Hitler"
2018	The Festival	Brother Julian	
2018	Get Carter: The Christchurch Murder	Douggie Quinn	Direct-to-video film
2019	Amundsen	Lord Curzon	
2019	Judy	Dr. Hargreaves	
2021	Being Mr. Wickham	George Wickham	Also co-writer
2023	Bank of Dave	Edward De Thame	
2023	The Boys in the Boat	Jay Ellis	
2024	Office Royale	Boss	Short film
2024	Joy	Professor Mason	
2025	Tiny Little Voices	Repton	
2025	Heads of State	Jack Gordon	
2026	How to Make a Killing	Father Morris	
TBA	Heavyweight	Bernard	Completed

=== Television ===
Year	Title	Role	Notes
1985	Dutch Girls	Murray	Television film
1987	The Bretts	Giles Peabody	Series 1; episode 2: "Driving Ambition"
1989	Campion	Matt D'Urfey	Series 1; episodes 7 & 8: "Death of a Ghost: Parts 1 & 2"
1989	After the War	Michael Jordan	Mini-series; episodes 2–7, 9 & 10
1989	Agatha Christie's Miss Marple	Tim Kendal	Episode 10: "A Caribbean Mystery"
1991	Sherlock Holmes	Jack Bennett	Series 3: The Case-Book of Sherlock Holmes; episode 6: "The Creeping Man"
1991	The Strauss Dynasty	Edi	Mini-series; episodes 1–8
1992	Maigret	Captain Danielou	Series 1; episode 3: "Maigret Goes to School"
1994	Citizen Locke	Richard	Television film
1995	Prime Suspect	John Warwick	Series 4; episode 1: "The Lost Child"
1995	Chandler & Co	Dr. Mark Judd	Series 2; episodes 2–6
1995	Pride and Prejudice	Lt. Wickham	Mini-series; episodes 2–6
1997–1999	Peak Practice	Dr. David Shearer	Series 5–7; 35 episodes
2001	The Hunt	The Hon. Hugh Whitton	Television film
2001	Back Home	Roger Dickinson	Television film
2003	Down to Earth	Laurent Falaise	Series 3; episodes 3 & 4: "The Last Dance" & "Moving On"
2003	Doc Martin and the Legend of the Cloutie	Rob Blake	Television film. 2nd prequel to Saving Grace
2003	Too Good to Be True	Matthew	2-part television drama
2003	Foyle's War	Blake Hardiman	Series 2; episode 4: "The Funk Hole"
2003	Absolute Power	Roddy Growse	Series 1; episode 5: "Country Life"
2004	Midsomer Murders	Philip Trent	Series 8; episode 2: "Dead in the Water"
2004	Spooks	John Sylvester	Series 3; episode 8: "Celebrity". Uncredited role
2005–2006	Judge John Deed	Marc Thompson	Series 4; episodes 3 & 4, & series 5; episodes 1–6
2006–2007	The Bill	Sgt. Doug Wright	Series 22 & 23; 6 episodes
2007	Trial & Retribution	Neil Dench	Series 10; episode 5: "Paradise Lost: Part 1"
2007	Britz	Horne	2-part television drama
2008	A Touch of Frost	James Callum	Series 14; episode 3: "In the Public Interest"
2008	Heartbeat	Rupert Middleton	Series 17; episode 15: "Hey Hey LBJ"
2009	Doctors	Mark Shelby	Series 11; episode 32: "Worlds Apart"
2009	Lewis	Jem Wishart	Series 3; episode 1: "Allegory of Love"
2009	Personal Affairs	Jeeves	Mini-series; episodes 4 & 5: "Fool on the Hill" & "Vital Statistix"
2010	Money	Ossie Twain	Mini-series; episodes 1 & 2
2010	Pete versus Life	(unknown)	Series 1; episode 5: "Ollie's Girlfriend"
2010–2011	Rosamunde Pilcher's Shades of Love	Noel Keeling	Series 1; episodes 1 & 2, & series 2; episodes 1 & 2
2011	Outnumbered	Martin	Series 4; episode 4: "The Parents' Evening"
2011	Fresh Meat	Richard Pemberley	Series 1; episode 6
2012	Doctors	Walt Carson	Series 13; episode 226: "Let Me Shipwreck"
2012	Silent Witness	Simon Avery	Series 15; episodes 1 & 2: "Death Has No Dominion: Parts 1 & 2"
2012–2015	Toast of London	Blair Toast	Series 1–3; 5 episodes
2013	Agatha Christie's Poirot	General Ravenscroft	Series 13; episode 1: "Elephants Can Remember"
2014	Midsomer Murders	Julian Calder	Series 16; episode 5: "The Killings of Copenhagen"
2014	Silk	Patrick Stephens	Series 3; episode 3: "Heavy Metal"
2015	Death in Paradise	Francis Davison	Series 4; episode 3: "Damned If You Do..."
2015	New Tricks	Tommy Naylor	Series 12; episodes 1 & 2: "Last Man Standing: Parts 1 & 2"
2015	Downton Abbey	Sir John Darnley	Series 6; episode 1
2015–2016	X Company	Lt.-Col. George Mayhew	Seasons 1 & 2: 7 episodes
2016	Follow the Money	CEO i London	Series 1; episode 6
2016	Black Mirror	Home Secretary, Alex Wallis	Series 3; episode 6: "Hated in the Nation"
2017	Apple Tree Yard	Witness A	Mini-series; episode 3
2017	Genius	Wilhelm Röntgen	Season 1; episode 3: "Einstein: Chapter Three"
2017	Grantchester	Superintendent John Baldwin	Series 3; episode 4
2017	Red Dwarf	Professor Telford	Series 12; episode 1: "Cured"
2017	The Crown	Vice-Admiral Connolly Abel Smith	Series 2; episodes 2 & 3: "A Company of Men" & "Lisbon"
2018	Collateral	Xan Schofield	Mini-series; episodes 2 & 3
2018	Bulletproof	Edward	Series 1; episode 6. Uncredited role
2018	Poldark	Sir John Mitford	Series 4; episode 7
2019	Vera	Graham Caswell	Series 9; episode 1: "Blind Spot"
2019	A Christmas Carol	Headmaster	Mini-series; episode 1: "The Human Beast"
2020	Spy City	Aldous Petrie	Episodes 1–6
2020–2021	Feel Good	Malcolm	Series 1 & 2; 7 episodes
2022	Toast of London	Blair Toast	Series 4: Toast of Tinseltown; episodes 1 & 6: "Anger Man" & "Monster Mash"
2022	Anatomy of a Scandal	Aitkin	Mini-series; episode 2
2022	The Man Who Fell to Earth	Edward Flood	Episode 9: "As the World Falls Down"
2022	SAS: Rogue Heroes	General Auchinleck	Series 1; episodes 2–4 & 6
2024	The Outlaws	Kelvin Archer	Series 3; episodes 2 & 4
2024	The Road Trip	Miles	Episodes 3, 4 & 6
2025	The Bombing of Pan Am 103	Roy Burman	Mini-series; episodes 1–6
2025	The War Between the Land and the Sea	Sir Jonathan Hynes	Mini-series
