= Leonardo the Musical: A Portrait of Love =

Critically panned musical

- Original West End poster
- Music: Russell Dunlop; Duke Minks; Greg Moeller; Tommy Moeller
- Lyrics: Russell Dunlop; Duke Minks; Greg Moeller; Tommy Moeller
- Book: John Kane
- Setting: Florence, 1503-17
- Basis: Mona Lisa by Leonardo da Vinci
- Productions: 1993 West End

Leonardo the Musical: A Portrait of Love is a musical with music and lyrics by Russell Dunlop, Duke Minks, Greg Moeller and Tommy Moeller and a book by John Kane.

The musical enjoyed critical acclaim while at Oxford and looked set to be a hit when it transferred to the West End, but the 1993 London production, under new management, is considered one of the biggest disasters in the history of London theatre. The management changed the original music and scripts after the Oxford shows, resulting in its failure. At least one of the leading actors had to have singing lessons, and it was said the director did not like musicals.

== Plot ==
The musical's rambling plot—which starts and ends with its protagonist on his deathbed, his completed masterpiece at his side—centers on the struggling artist Leonardo's commission to paint a young woman named Lisa, betrothed to nobleman Francesco Del Giocondo. The artist and his model engage in a passionate affair resulting in her pregnancy, and she returns to her fiancé, pretending the child is his to avoid public scandal and his private wrath. Eventually she returns to beg for forgiveness from the now successful Leonardo, who accidentally is murdered by her husband when he confronts the two in a jealous rage. A subplot hinting at Leonardo's homosexuality involves his close friendship with his young assistant, a painter named Melzi.

== Production history ==
The project, a highly fictionalized account of Leonardo da Vinci's creation of the Mona Lisa, was developed by Duke Minks, an advisor to the Republic of Nauru and former road manager for the 1960s pop group, Unit 4 + 2, along with the group's lead singer, Tommy Moeller. At Moeller's suggestion, Minks convinced government officials to invest £2 million in the production, in an attempt to diversify the country's wealth from its historic major export, marine deposits rich in phosphates. The phosphate resources were derived primarily from bird droppings (guano), a fact that would be incorporated in critical reviews of the production.

The production, plagued by problems with sets, costumes, and—most significantly—the script throughout its development, opened at the Strand Theatre on June 3, 1993. By the time the performance ended, nearly four hours after the curtain first rose, most of the audience had departed. A victim of critical disdain and audience indifference, the show closed five weeks later on July 10. The cast included Paul Collis, Jane Arden, James Barron, Hal Fowler and Rebecca Pearce.

== Partial song list ==
- "Renaissance"
- "Who The Hell Are You?"
- "Firenza Mia"
- "Part Of Your Life"
- "Just A Dream Away"
- "Her Heart Beats"
- "Endless As My Love"
- "Just One More Time"
- "Goodbye And No One Said A Word"
- "Forever Child"
- "Portrait Of Love"
- "She Lives With Me"

== Legacy ==
In February 2022, an episode of the BBC Radio 4 programme The Political Butterfly Effect told the story of the musical's production and discussed its links with Nauru's decision to act as an off-shore asylum seeker processing centre for Australia. The musical was also mocked on the June 9th 2024 episode of the HBO series Last Week Tonight with John Oliver.
