= Jane Arden (actress) =

English actress and singer

Jane Arden (born 1959) is an English actress and singer known for her performances in Shakespeare roles and musical theatre.

== Life and career ==
Born in England, she moved to Hong Kong in 1960, at the age of one, and lived there for 25 years; there she became interested in theatre watching Derek Nimmo's Dinner Theatre. She returned to the UK to train for the theatre at the Theatre Arts School in Sussex. Her first Shakespeare role was Jessica in The Merchant of Venice and then co-founded the British Actors' Theatre Company, a self-directed touring company, playing Bianca in The Taming of the Shrew, Celia in As You Like It. At the Regent's Park Open Air Theatre she played Hermia in A Midsummer Night's Dream and Perdita in The Winter's Tale. She was Hoyden in John Vanbrugh's The Relapse at the Mermaid Theatre. She became an associate director for Actors from the London Stage (AFTLS), a company that tours Shakespeare plays to universities in the US. She played Lady Macbeth, Portia, Celia, Ariel and Juliet for the company. Other Shakespearean roles have been Hermia, Perdita, Maria, Lady Capulet. She has played in theatres throughout the UK in roles which have included several Alan Ayckbourn plays, including Amaretti Angels.

Arden's musical credits in West End productions include Susannah in Someone Like You at the Strand Theatre (1990), Tuptim in The King and I at Sadler's Wells Theatre (1991), Mona Lisa in Leonardo the Musical: A Portrait of Love at the Strand Theatre (1993). Other appearances in musicals included Gypsy and George and Ira Gershwin's Lady Be Good.

For the Royal Shakespeare Company Arden played Cecile in Les Liaisons Dangereuses in the West End and on tour, and chorus in Hecuba at the Noël Coward Theatre (2005), where she appeared in the title role on several occasions when Vanessa Redgrave was indisposed. Tours have included Celia-Phebe-Amiens in As You Like It, Miranda-Ariel in The Tempest, Juliet-Benvolio in Romeo and Juliet, Portia-Solanio in The Merchant of Venice, and Lady Macbeth in Macbeth.

Arden's television credits include Lost Empires with Colin Firth and Laurence Olivier and The Strauss Dynasty, a biography of Johann Strauss, with John Gielgud.

In 2009 Arden started her own theatre company, British Actors' Group, touring dinner theatre and bespoke productions.
