= Tržič =

- Town
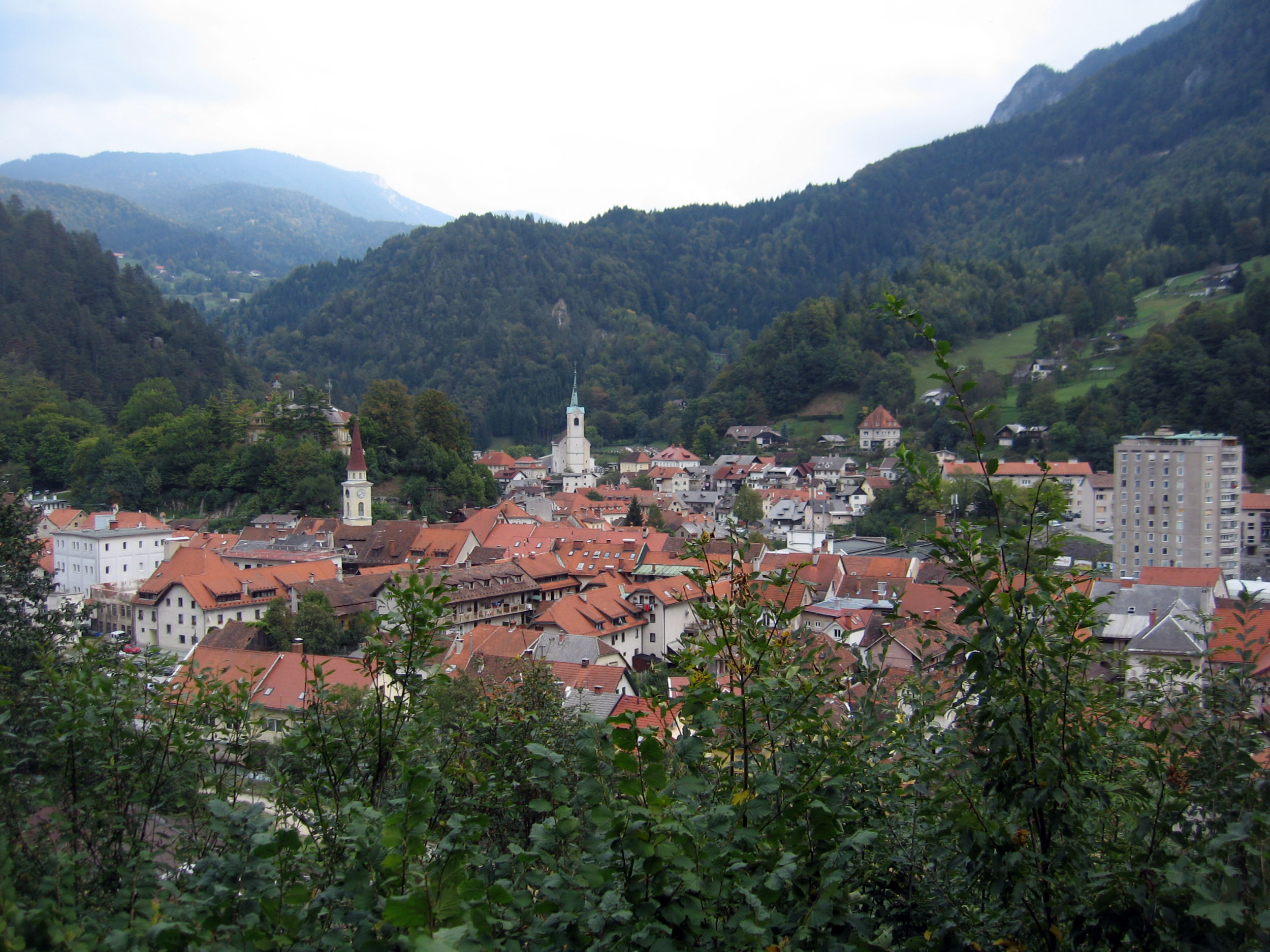
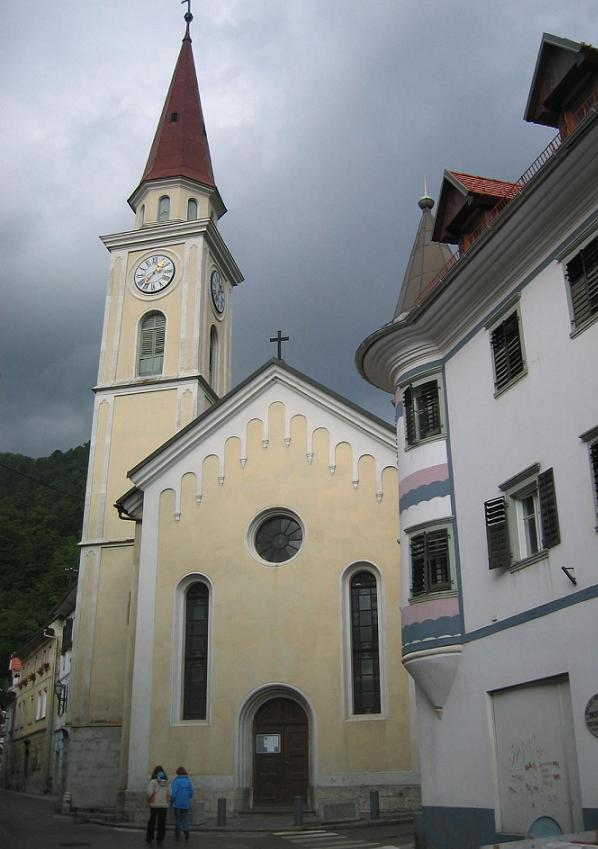
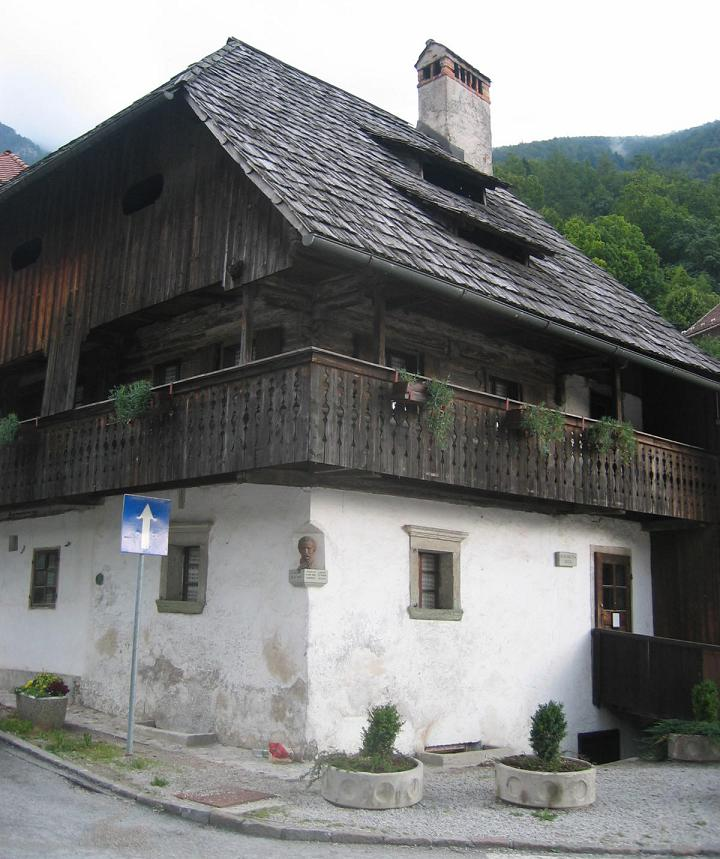
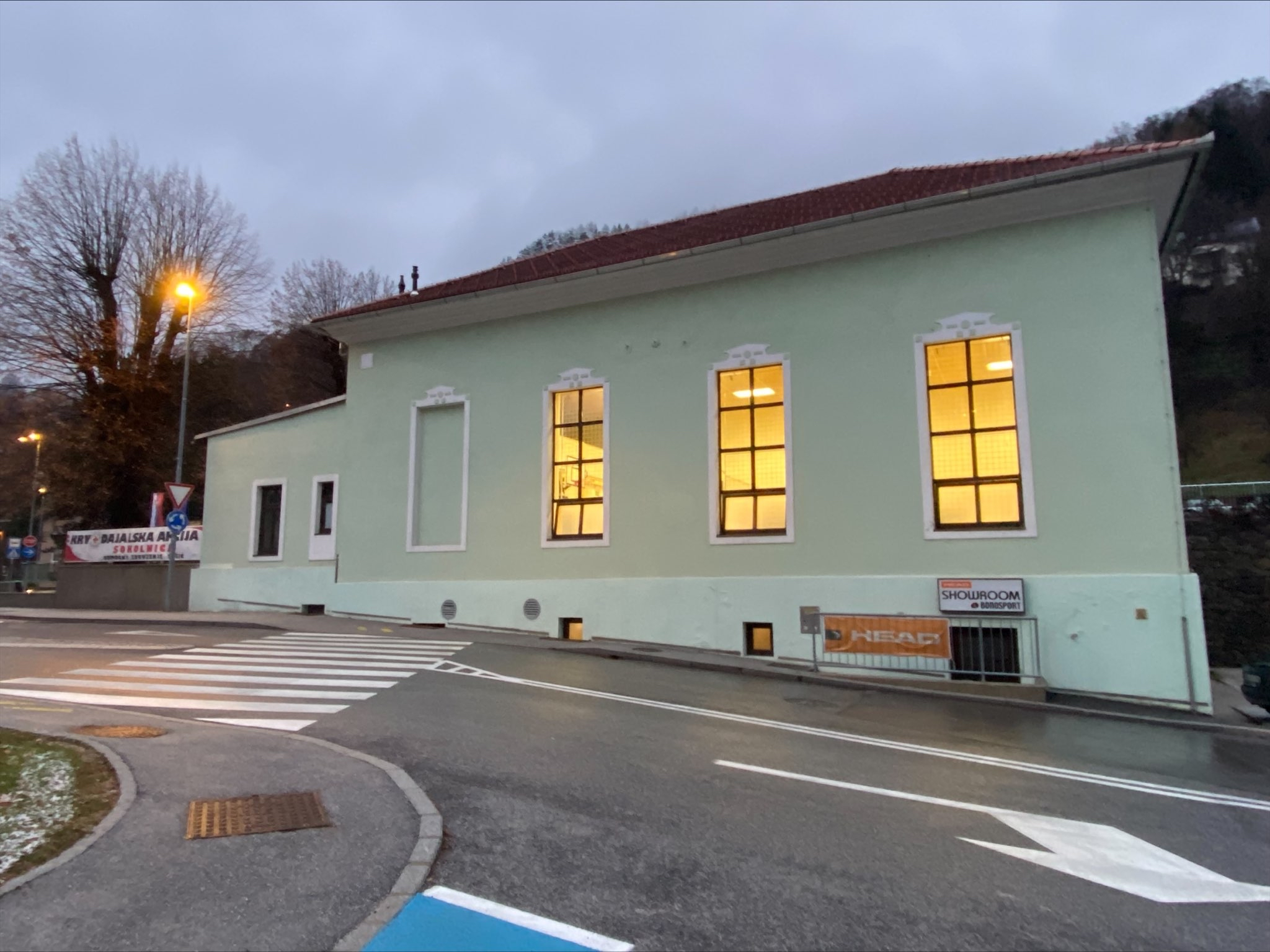
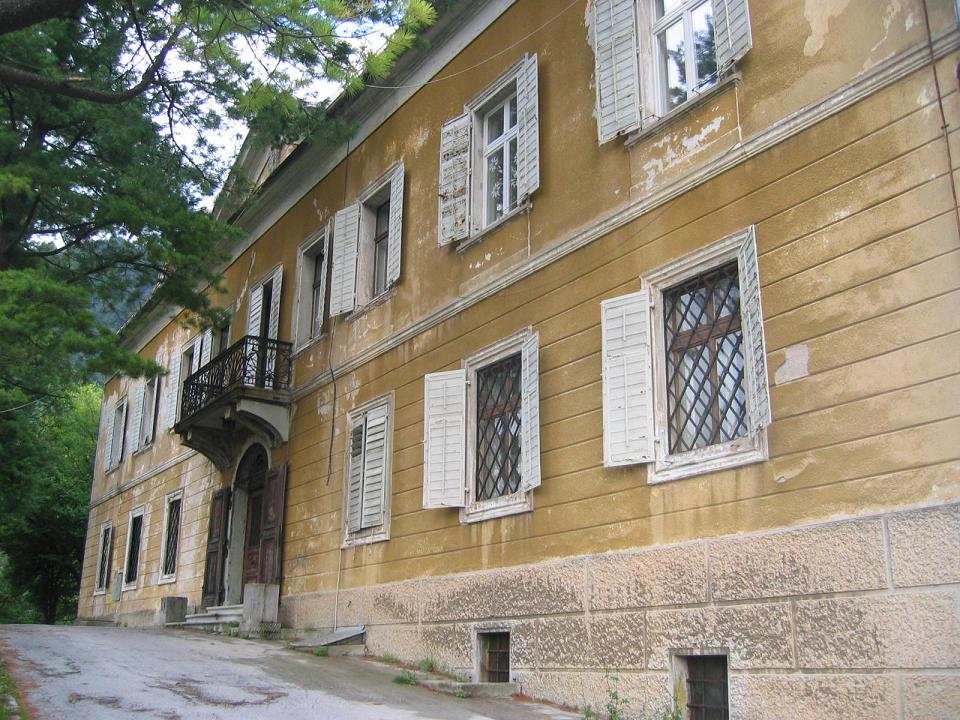
- From top, left to right: Overview of Tržič, Church, Kurnik house, Sokol hall, Neuhaus Castle

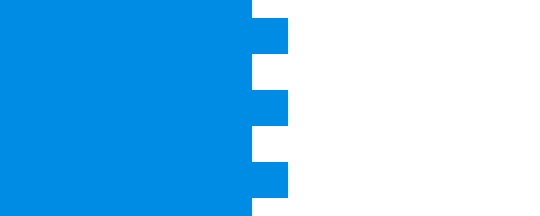
- Flag

- Location in Slovenia
- Coordinates: 46°21′29.09″N 14°17′34.64″E
- Country: Slovenia
- Traditional region: Upper Carniola
- Statistical region: Upper Carniola
- Municipality: Tržič

Area
  - Total: 5.35 km^{2} (2.07 sq mi)
- Elevation: 516.4 m (1,694 ft)

Population (2019)
  - Total: 3,670
- Vehicle registration: KR

Tržič (pronounced [təɾˈʒítʃ]; German: Neumarktl) is a town in northern Slovenia, close to the Austrian border. It is the seat of the Municipality of Tržič.

== Geography ==
The town is located within the historic Upper Carniola region on the Tržič Bistrica River, a left tributary of the Sava. In the north, a road leads up to the Loibl Pass in the Karawanks mountain range, the border with the Austrian state of Carinthia.

== History ==
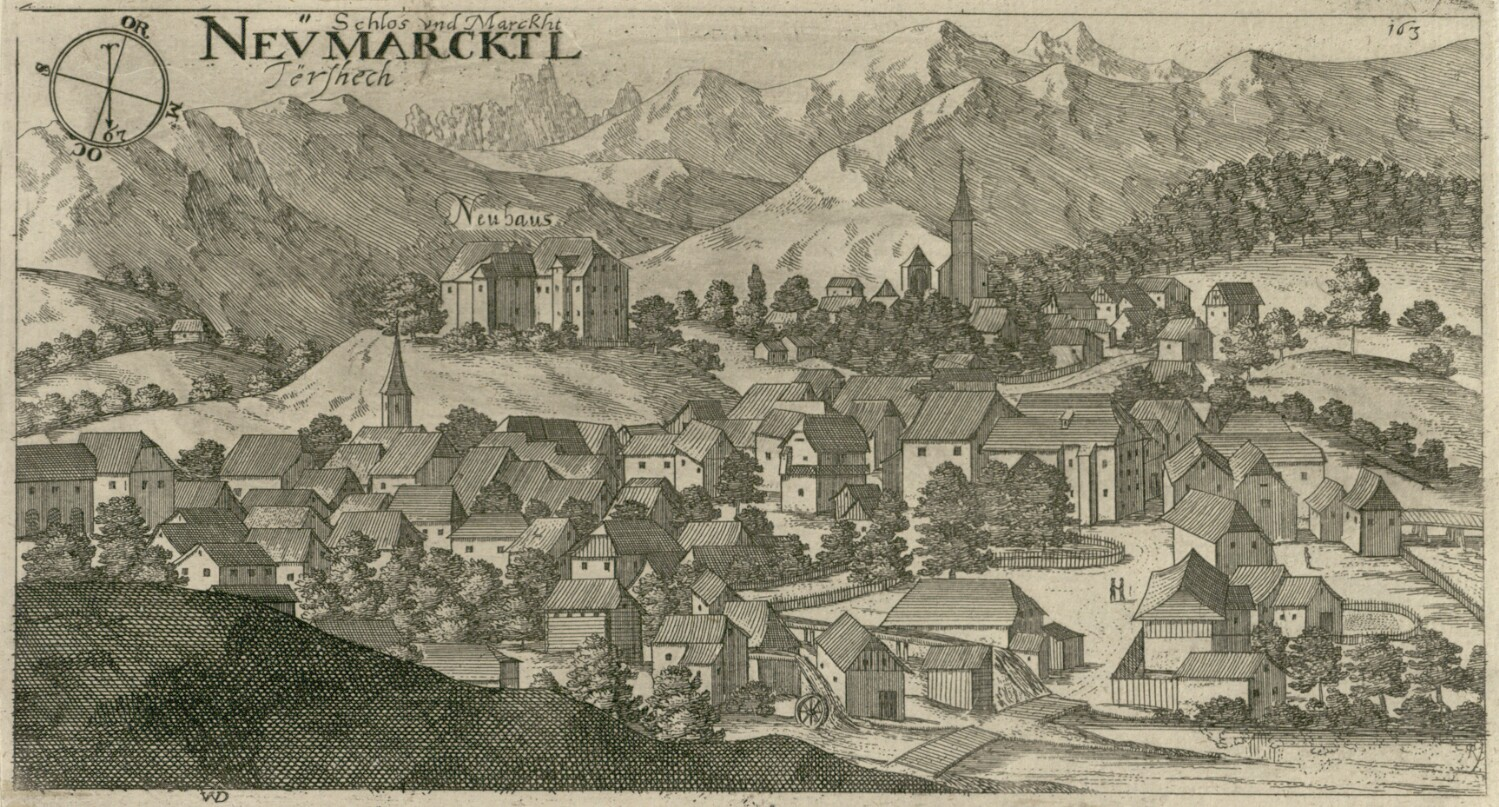
Neumarcktl, Johann Weikhard von Valvasor, 1679

A first settlement named Forum in Lubelino was founded along the Roman road that ran from the ancient city of Emona (in present-day Ljubljana) via Loibl Pass to Virunum and the Zollfeld plain in the Noricum province (present-day Carinthia). After a massive landslide caused by an earthquake, the original settlement was destroyed, and many people moved down the valley to establish a new village named Neumarktl in German, where Tržič is now located. These events are the basis of the legend about the origin of Tržič.

The settlement, part of the Duchy of Carniola, was granted market rights to hold weekly fairs by the Habsburg emperor Frederick III in 1492, which further promoted the development of the town. The great fire of 1811, which destroyed the buildings on the left bank of the Tržič Bistrica River, changed the town. Much of the architecture was reconstructed in a Classicist style. After the buildings were rebuilt, they needed to have firewalls, iron doors, and window covers, a very rare feature in Europe. The town center of Tržič has been protected as a cultural heritage site since 1985. Over centuries, the city had been a German language island.

== Economy ==
The leather, wood, and textile industries were important to the economy of Tržič in the past but industrial activity declined after the breakup of Yugoslavia. The development of small business after this period is now an important branch of the economy.

Because of its alpine setting, alpine skiing is popular in the surrounding area.

Historical population
Year	Pop.	±%
1948	3,960	—
1953	4,117	+4.0%
1961	4,811	+16.9%
1971	4,509	−6.3%
1981	4,074	−9.6%
1991	4,216	+3.5%
2002	3,920	−7.0%
2011	3,865	−1.4%
2021	3,744	−3.1%
Population size may be affected by changes in administrative divisions.

== Notable people ==
Notable people that were born or lived in Tržič include:

- Feliks Anton Dev (a.k.a. Johannes Damascenus a nomine Mariae, 1732–1786), poet, translator, and editor
- Countess Francisca von Strassoldo Grafenberg (1781–1854), wife of Austrian General Joseph Radetzky
- Ivan Bobersky (1873–1947), Ukrainian politician and sports promoter
