= Joseph Radetzky von Radetz =

Austrian field marshal (1766–1858)

Field Marshal The Most Excellent Count Joseph Radetzky von Radetz
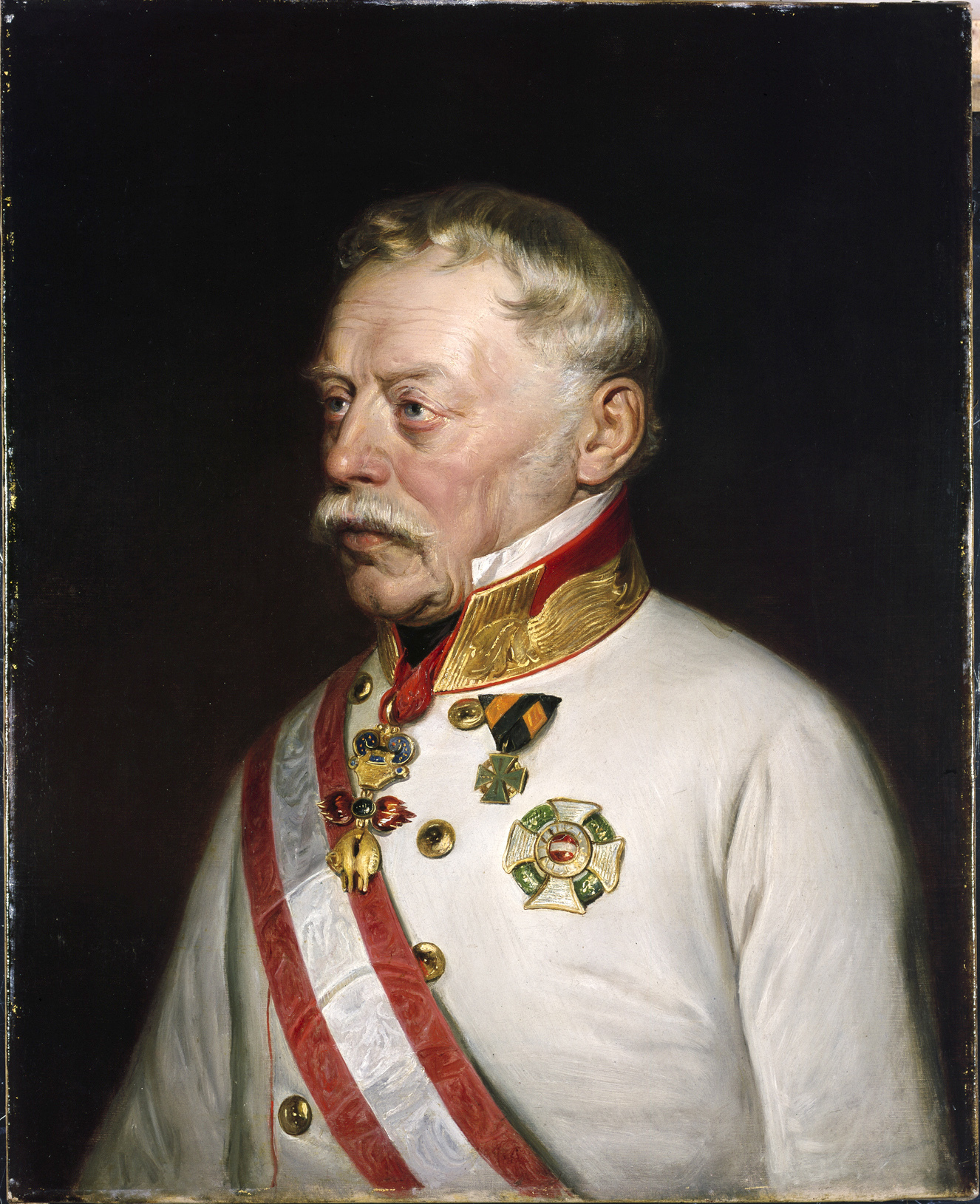
- Portrait by Georg Decker

Governor-General of Lombardy–Venetia
- In office 1848–1857
- Monarch: Franz Joseph I
- Preceded by: Rainer Joseph of Austria (Viceroy)
- Succeeded by: Ferdinand Maximilian of Austria (Viceroy)

Personal details
- Born: 2 November 1766 Třebnice, Kingdom of Bohemia, Holy Roman Empire (today Czech Republic)
- Died: 5 January 1858 (aged 91) Milan, Kingdom of Lombardy–Venetia, Austrian Empire (today Italy)
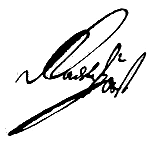
- Signature

Military service
- Allegiance: Habsburg monarchy (Austrian Empire) Austria
- Branch/service: Austrian Army during the French Revolutionary and Napoleonic Wars, Imperial Austrian Army of 1806–1867
- Years of service: 1785–1858
- Rank: Field Marshal
- Battles/wars: Austro-Turkish War; French Revolutionary Wars; Napoleonic Wars; First Italian War of Independence; Battle of Santa Lucia; Battle of Custoza (1848); Battle of Mortara; Battle of Novara (1849)

Johann Josef Wenzel Anton Franz Karl, Graf Radetzky von Radetz (2 November 1766 – 5 January 1858) was a Czech nobleman and Austrian field marshal. He served as chief of the general staff in the Habsburg monarchy during the later period of the Napoleonic Wars and contributed to the Trachenberg Plan and the Leipzig Campaign, which led to the Battle of Leipzig. Afterwards, he embarked on military reforms of the Austrian army. He was known among his troops by the sobriquet 'Vater Radetzky' (Father Radetzky). He commanded the Austrian forces at the Battle of Custoza in 1848 and the Battle of Novara in 1849 during the First Italian War of Independence. Johann Strauss I's Radetzky March was commissioned to commemorate Radetzky's victory at the Battle of Custoza.

== Early years ==
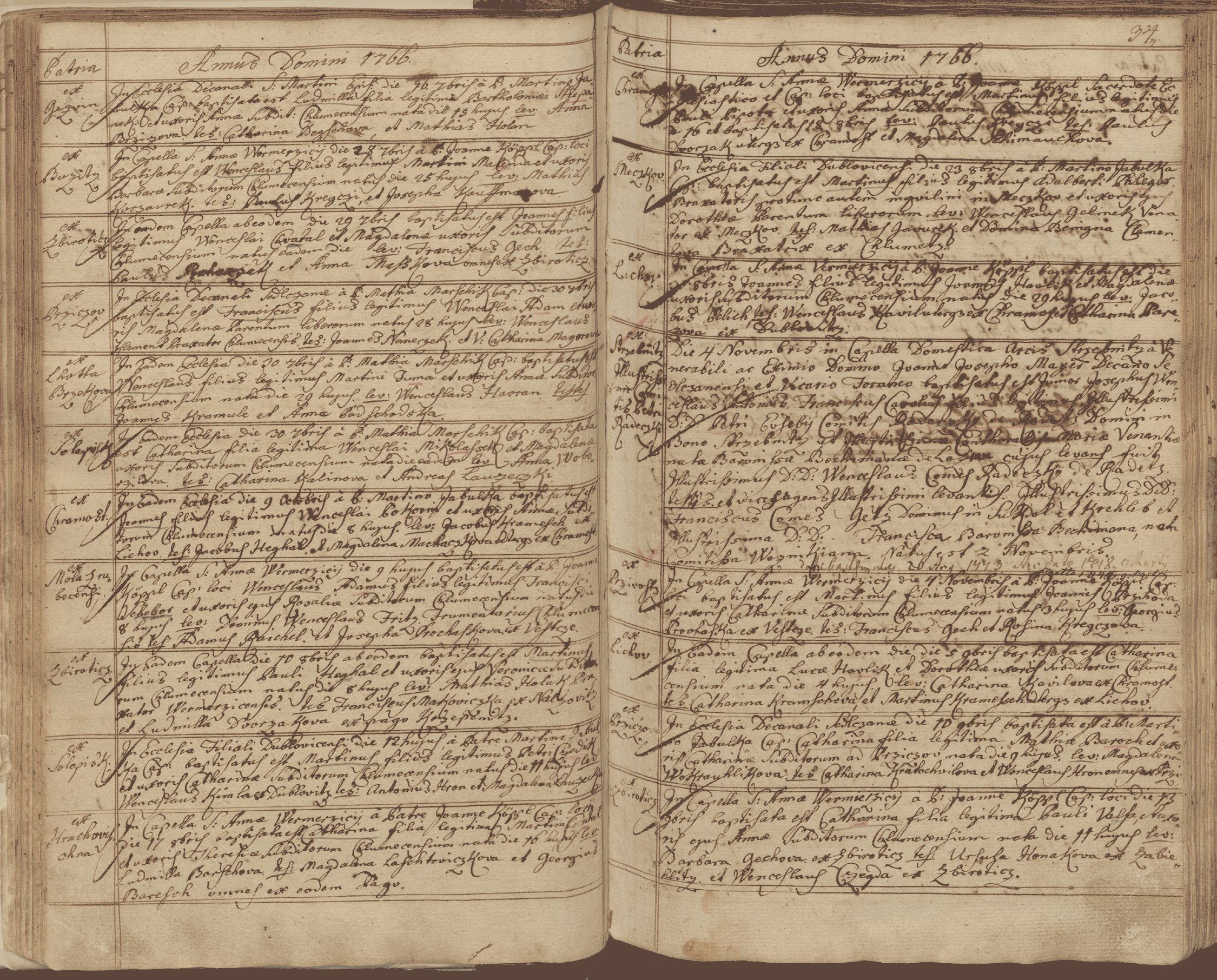
Josef Václav Radecký birth record 1766 (SOA Prague)

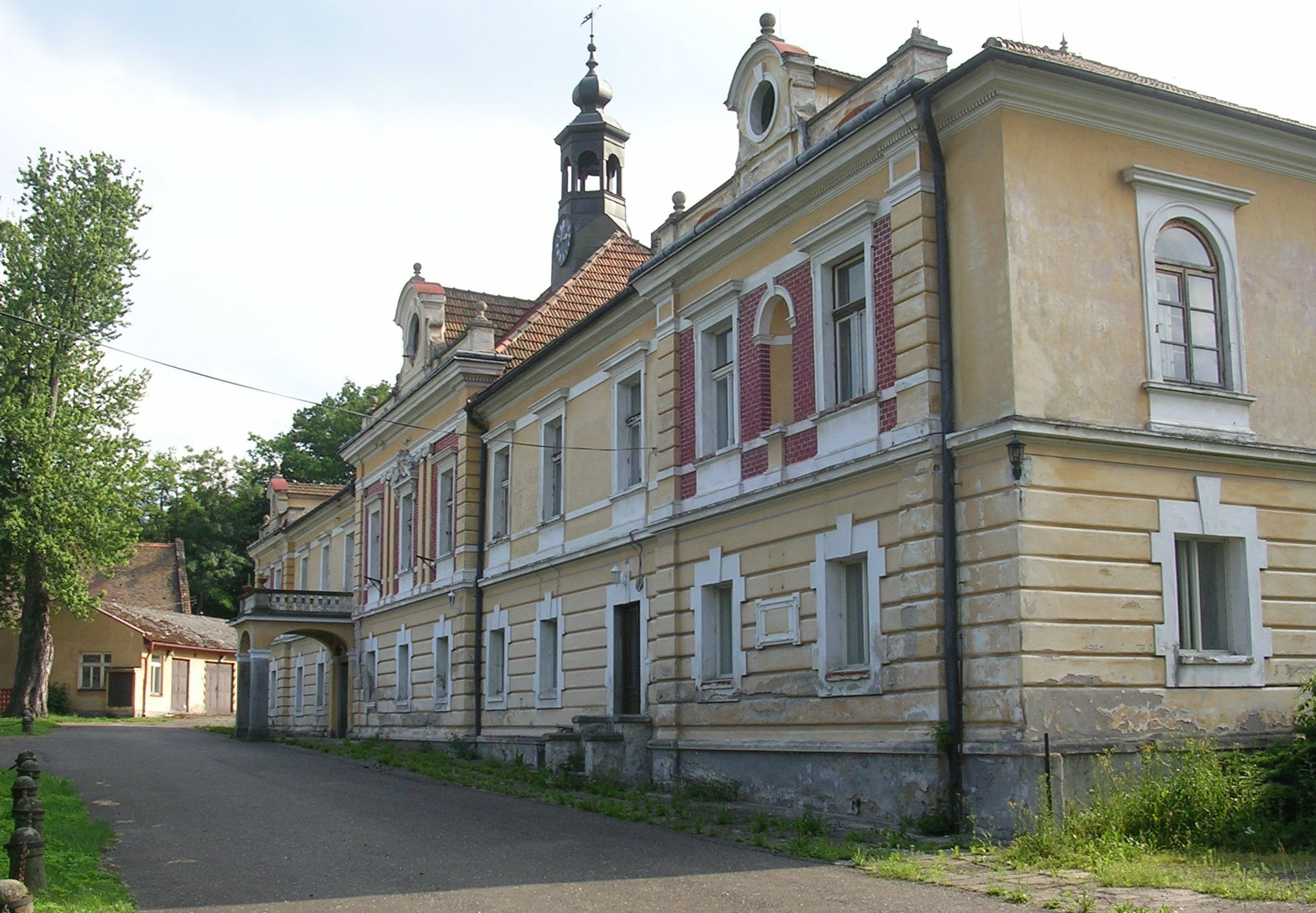
Chateau Třebnice, Radetzky's birthplace

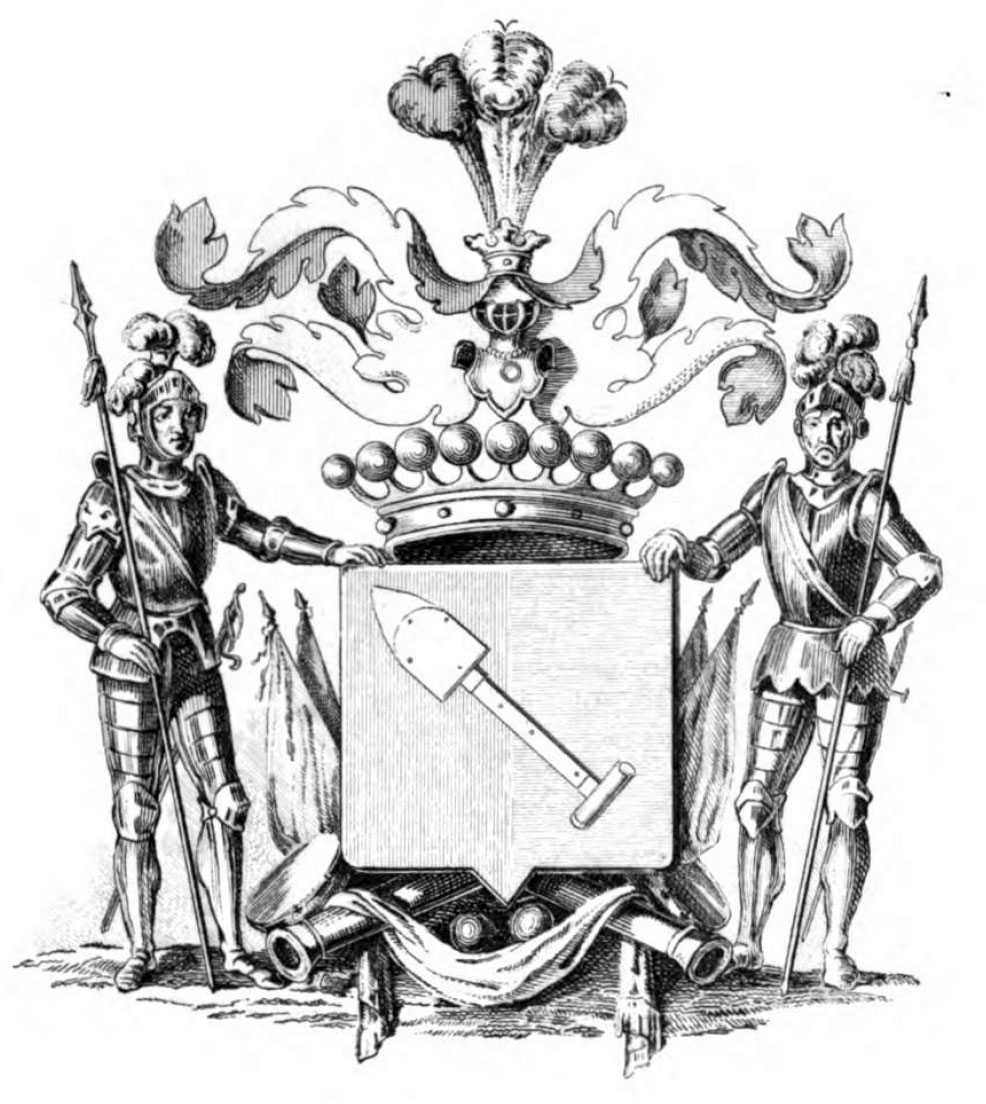
Coat of arms of Radetzky

Radetzky, a titled Graf ('Count'), was born into a noble Bohemian military family of Czech origin at Chateau Třebnice (German: Trebnitz) near Sedlčany in Bohemia (now part of the town). His father, Count Peter Eusebius Radetzky von Radetz (1732–1766) died shortly after his birth, while his mother, Baroness Marie Venantia Anna Barbara Josepha Bechinie von Lažan (1738–1772), died while he was still a child. Orphaned at an early age Radetzky was educated by his grandfather, and after the latter's death, he continued at the Theresa Academy in Vienna. The academy was dissolved during his first year's residence in 1785, and Radetzky became a cadet in the Austrian Army. The following year he became an officer, and in 1787 was promoted to first lieutenant in a cuirassier regiment. He served as an adjutant to both Count von Lacy and Field Marshal von Laudon during the Austro-Turkish War of 1787–1791 where he was present at the Siege of Belgrade, and in the Austrian Netherlands from 1792 to 1795.

In 1798, he married Countess Franziska von Strassoldo-Grafenberg from Tržič, Carniola (now in Slovenia). On her mother's side, she was a descendant of the Austrian House of Auersperg, which ruled one of the hereditary Habsburg duchies in what is now Slovenia. They had five sons and three daughters, only two of whom outlived their father. Radetzky also had a longstanding romantic relationship with his Italian mistress, Giuditta Meregalli of Sesto San Giovanni. She was 40 years his junior and bore him four children, all of whom took his name and were recognized by Radetzky. Meregalli received extensive letters from him, written during his battles. He was a devout lifelong Roman Catholic.

== Napoleonic wars ==
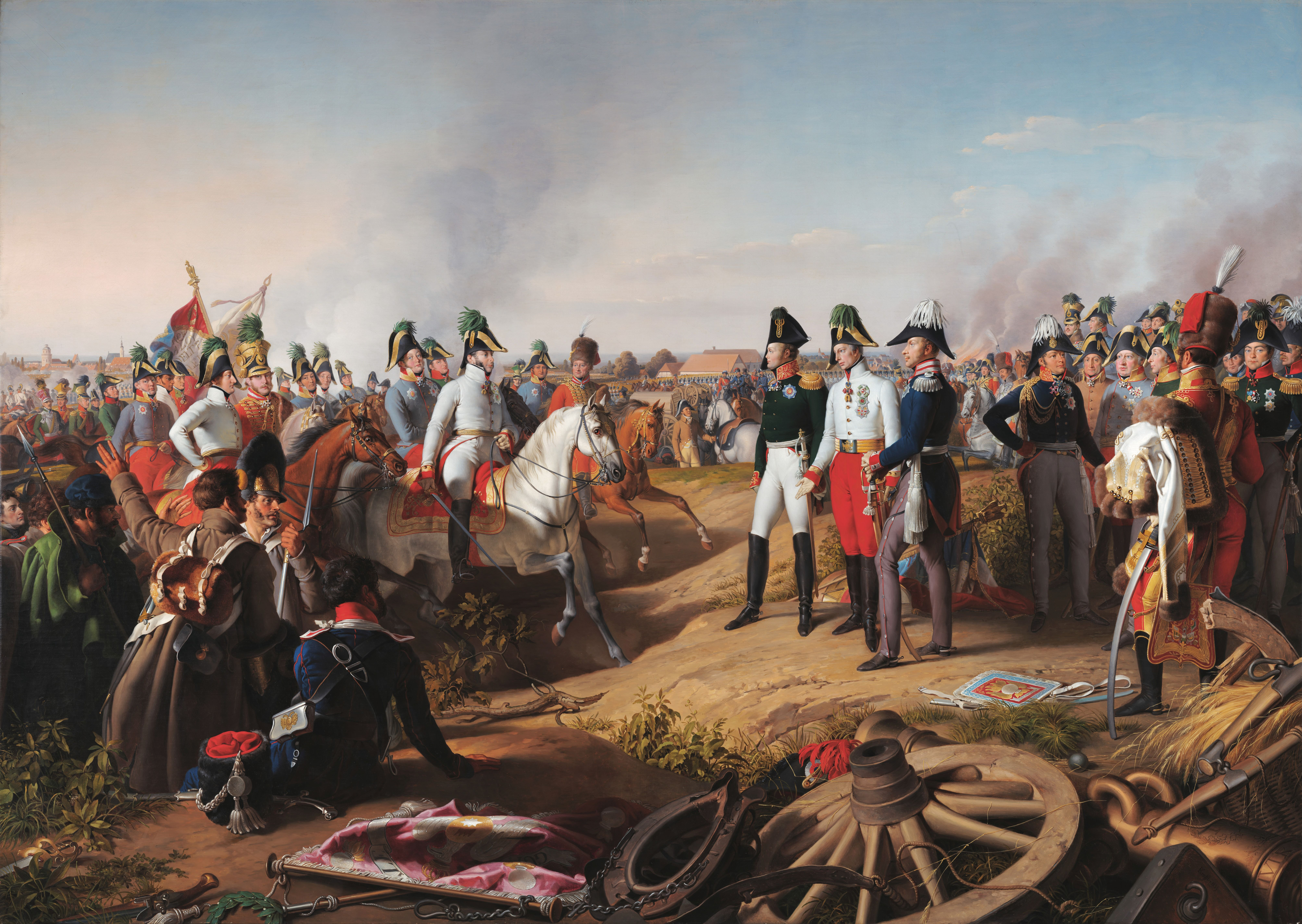
The Declaration of Victory After the Battle of Leipzig by Johann Peter Krafft. Aftermath of the Battle of Leipzig

In 1795 Radetzky fought on the Rhine. The following year he served with Johann Beaulieu against Napoleon in Italy, but disliked the indecisive "cordon" system of warfare which Count von Lacy had instituted and other Austrian generals imitated. His personal courage was conspicuous. At the Battle of Fleurus (1794) he led a party of cavalry through the French lines to discover the fate of Charleroi, at the Battle of Voltri he was in the thick of the action and roused the troops to victory and at Valeggio sul Mincio in 1796, with a few hussars, he rescued Beaulieu from the enemy. Promoted to major, Radetzky was made head of the pioneer corps, a unit responsible for road and bridge building which he transformed into one of the most elite units in the army. He took part in Dagobert Wurmser's Siege of Mantua campaign, which ended in the fall of that fortress. During the four and a half month siege, Radetzky impressed everyone with his determination and defensive tactics, leading sorties and erecting defensive fortifications at San Giorgio and in front of the Tore Ceresa. As lieutenant-colonel and colonel, his unit was expanded and he displayed bravery and skill in the battles of Trebbia and Novi (1799), winning praise from his superiors for his leadership during attacks at Trebbia and Novi (1799), for which he received praise from his superiors. At the Battle of Marengo, as colonel on the staff of Melas, he was hit by five bullets, after endeavouring on the previous evening to bring about modifications in the plan suggested by the "scientific" Anton von Zach. He was then transferred to take command of a regiment in Germany where he distinguished himself at the Battle of Hohenlinden. In 1801 Radetzky was made a Knight of the Military Order of Maria Theresa.

In 1805, on the march to Ulm, he received news of his promotion to major-general and his assignment to a command in Italy under the Archduke Charles of Austria. He thus took part in the failed Battle of Caldiero and was highly critical of the way in which the campaign had been conducted (1805). Peace provided a short respite, which he spent in studying and teaching the art of war. In 1809 he distinguished himself in rearguard actions at Abensberg and led a brigade in V Corps during the Battle of Eckmühl. Promoted lieutenant field marshal, he commanded a division in IV Corps at the Battle of Wagram. In 1810 he was created a Commander of the Order of Maria Theresa and became Inhaber of the 5th Radetzky Hussars. From 1809 to 1812, as chief of the general staff, he was active in reorganizing the army and its tactical system, but, unable to carry out the reforms he desired owing to the opposition of the Treasury, he resigned his position. In 1813 he was Schwarzenberg's chief of staff and had considerable influence on the councils of the Allied sovereigns and generals. Langenau, the quartermaster-general of the Grand Army, found him an indispensable assistant. He was involved in directing the operations that led to the crushing defeat of an entire French corps at the Battle of Kulm and had a considerable share in planning the Leipzig campaign. He won praise for his tactical skills in the battles of Brienne, La Rothière, Arcis-sur-Aube and Fère-Champenoise. He entered Paris with the allied sovereigns in March 1814, and returned with them to the Congress of Vienna, where he appears to have acted as an intermediary between Metternich and Tsar Alexander I of Russia, when the two were not on speaking terms.

== Italian campaigns ==
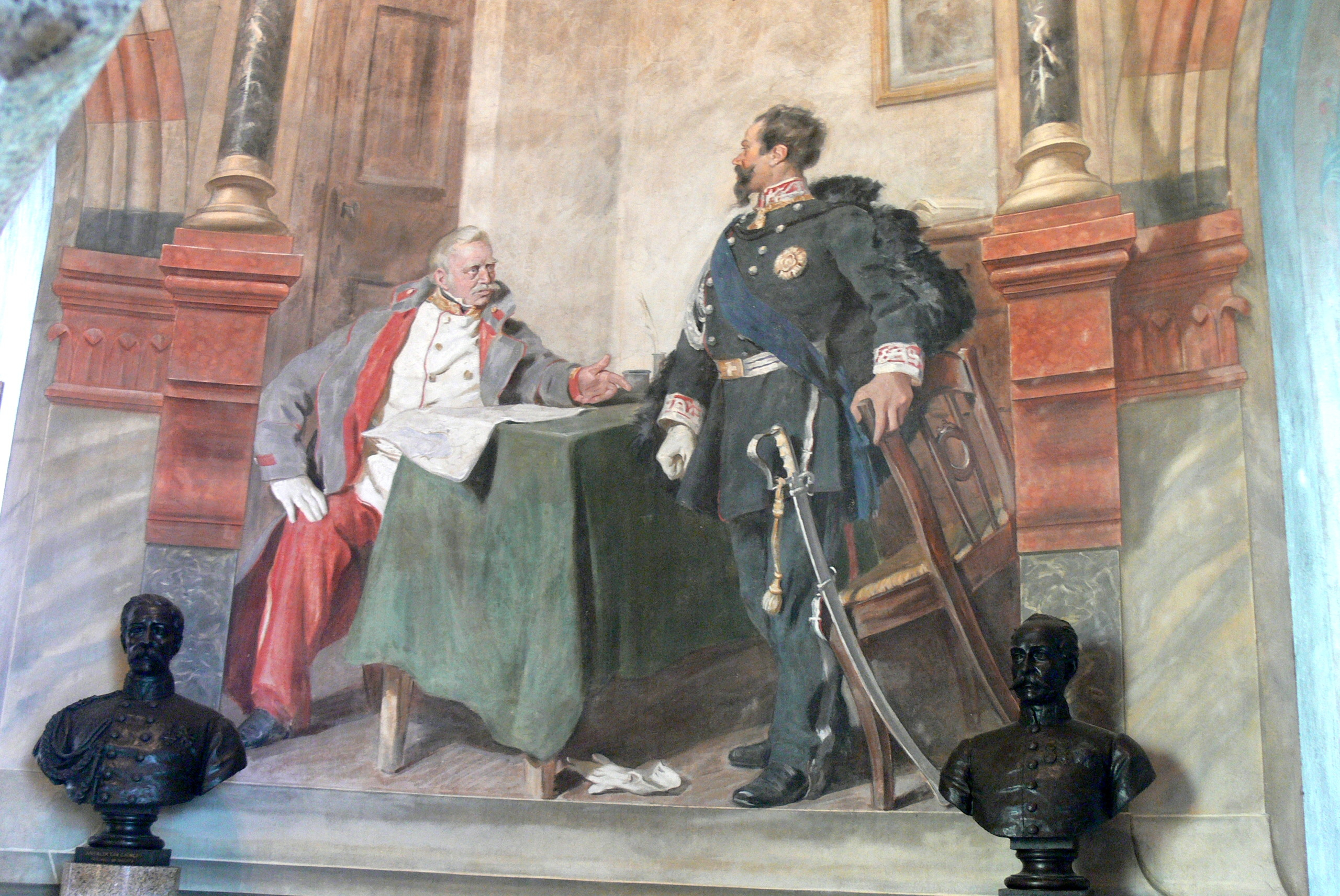
Fresco showing the meeting between Radetzky and the new king of Sardinia Victor Emmanuel II, 24 March 1849

During the succeeding years of peace he disappeared from public view. He resumed his functions as chief of staff, but his ardent ideas for reforming the army came to nothing in the face of the general war-weariness and desire to "let well enough alone." His zeal added to the number of his enemies, and in 1829, after twenty years as lieutenant field marshal, it was proposed to place him on the retired list. The emperor, unwilling to go as far as that, promoted him general of cavalry and shelved him by making him governor of a fortress. But very soon afterwards, the Restoration settlement of Europe was shaken by fresh upheavals, and Radetzky was brought back into the field of war again. He took part under Frimont in the campaign against the Papal States insurgents, and succeeded that general in the chief command of the Austrian army in Italy in 1834.

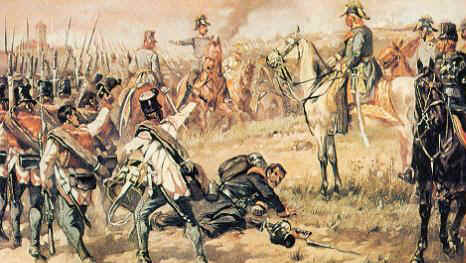
Radetzky at the Battle of Novara, 1849

In 1836, Radetzky was promoted to full field marshal. He was then seventy, but still displayed the vigor and zeal of his youth in the training and discipline of the army he commanded. But there too he was in advance of his time, and the government not only disregarded his suggestions and warnings but also refused the military the money that would have enabled the finest army it possessed to take the field at a moment's notice. Thus the events of 1848 in Italy, which gave the old field marshal his place in history among the great commanders, found him, in the beginning, not unprepared but seriously handicapped in the struggle with Charles Albert's army, and the insurgents in Milan and elsewhere. By falling back to the Quadrilatero and there, rebuffing one opponent after another, he was able to buy time until reinforcements arrived, and thenceforward up to the final triumph at the Battle of Novara on 23 March 1849, he and his army carried all before them. He also commanded the Austrian troops who reconquered Venice after the year-long siege of the rebellious city in May 1848 – August 1849. He became a Knight of the Order of the Golden Fleece in 1848.

His well-disciplined sense of duty towards officers of higher rank had become more intense in the long years of peace, and, after keeping his army loyal midst the confusion of 1848, he made no attempt to play the part of Wallenstein or even to assume Wellington's role of "family adviser to the nation". Despite his expressed support for German unification, he remained a commander in the Imperial Austrian Army until his retirement.

After his triumph in Italy, he was made Viceroy of Lombardy–Venetia from 1848 to 1857 – being the only one not of royal Habsburg blood.

Repression in Lombardy–Venetia was severe: the Austrians could act with impunity and little denunciation from the exiled patriots in the rest of Italy, and masking their action as "repression of banditry," there was little danger of it acquiring international resonance. From 1849, Radetzky introduced public caning as a form of punishment, the death penalty for armed uprising and life sentences for plotting revolutionary activities. The Belfiore martyrs, Luigi Dottesio and Amatore Sciesa were among the many who were executed for treason.

== Death ==
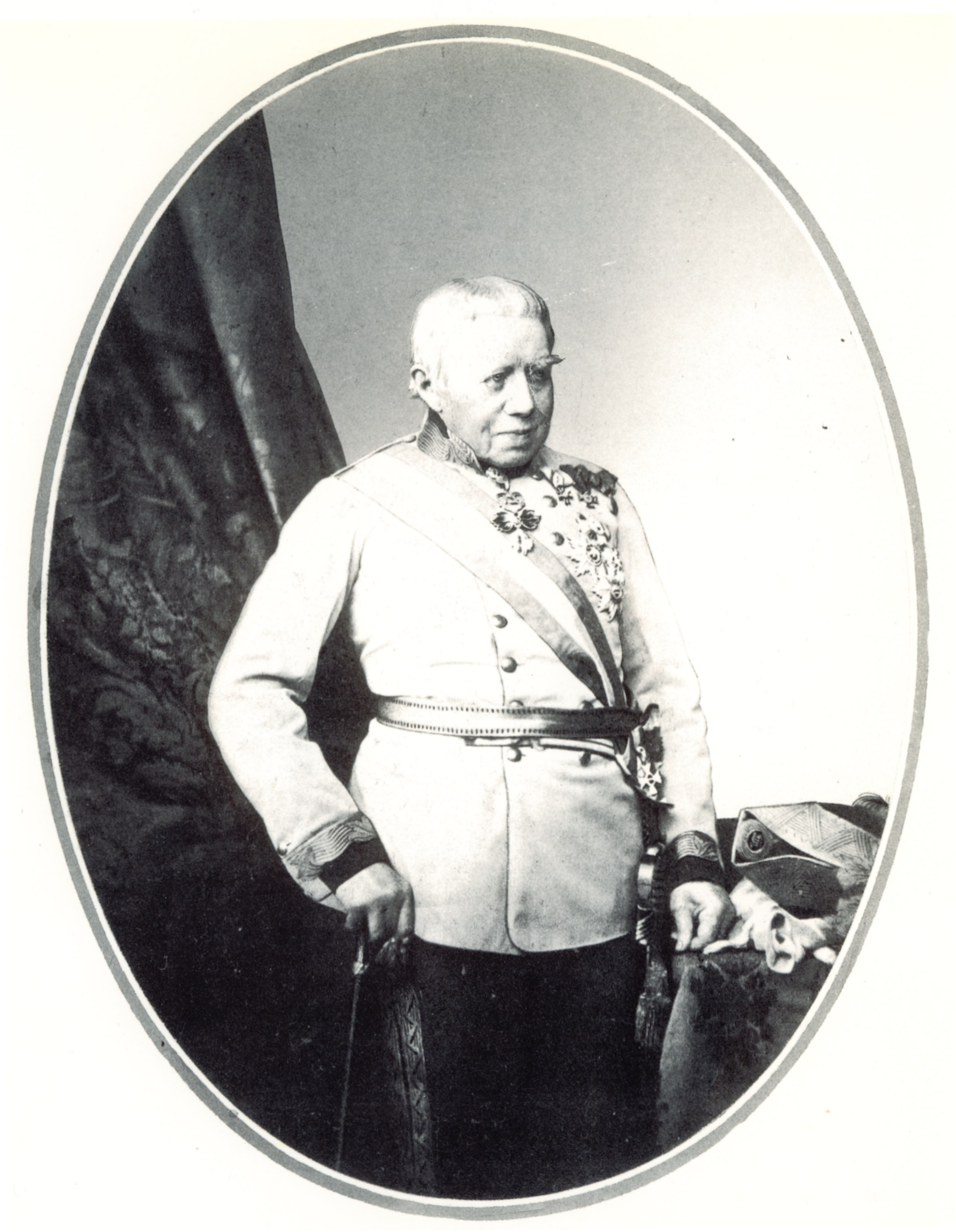
Radetzky in 1857, roughly one year before his death

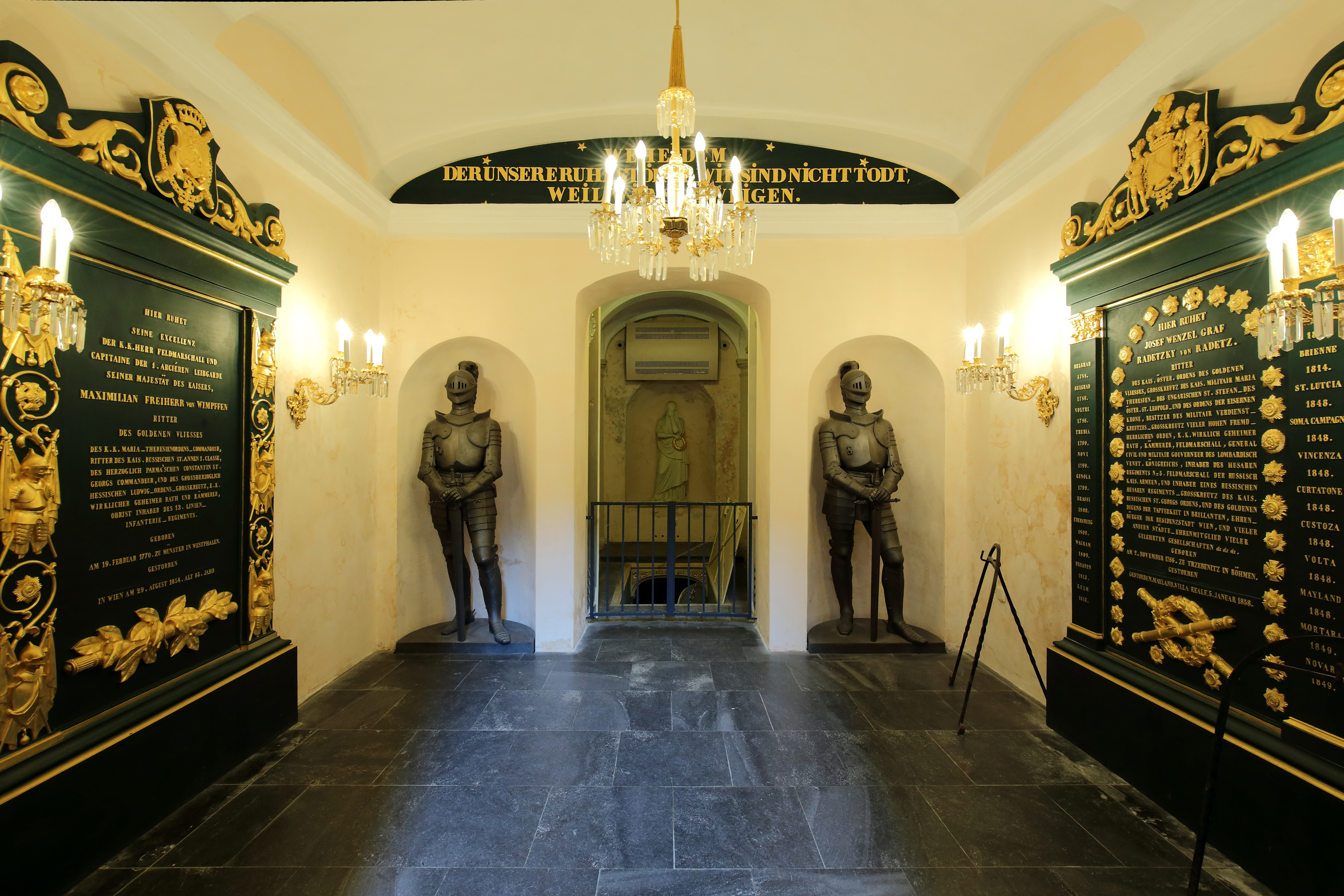
Radetzky's burial place, the crypt under the obelisk at Heldenberg Memorial

Josef Wenzel Graf Radetzky of Radetz died from pneumonia on 5 January 1858 in Milan. The Emperor wished him to be buried in the Capuchin crypt (the Imperial Crypt in Vienna); however, Radetzky had bequeathed his earthly remains, and the right to bury him, to Joseph Gottfried Pargfrieder, an army supplies merchant and land owner, who decades earlier had settled his debts.

On 19 January 1858, Radetzky was buried at the Heldenberg Memorial site (Gedenkstätte Heldenberg) in Lower Austria, an open-air pantheon with warrior statues celebrating the heroes of Austrian military history from Middle Ages to the 19th century (Heldenberg literally translates as "Heroes Mountain"). Radetzky lies buried in a crypt under a monumental obelisk in the central part of the pantheon, together with Field Marshal Maximilian von Wimpffen and Pargfrieder himself.

== Legacy ==
In military history Radetzky is highly regarded as a brilliant field marshal, while some social historians consider his role as a viceroy as the point of no return in the troubled relationship between Austria and the Italian population. Radetzky was the namesake of several Austrian and Austro-Hungarian Navy warships, including the screw frigate SMS Radetzky, which fought Italy in the Third Italian War of Independence, and the SMS Radetzky, the lead ship of the Radetzky-class of pre-dreadnought battleships.

The Radetzky March (German: Radetzkymarsch) is a military march composed by Johann Strauss (senior) that was first performed on August 31, 1848, to celebrate the victory of the Austrian Empire under Field Marshal Radetzky von Radetz over Italian forces at the Battle of Custoza.

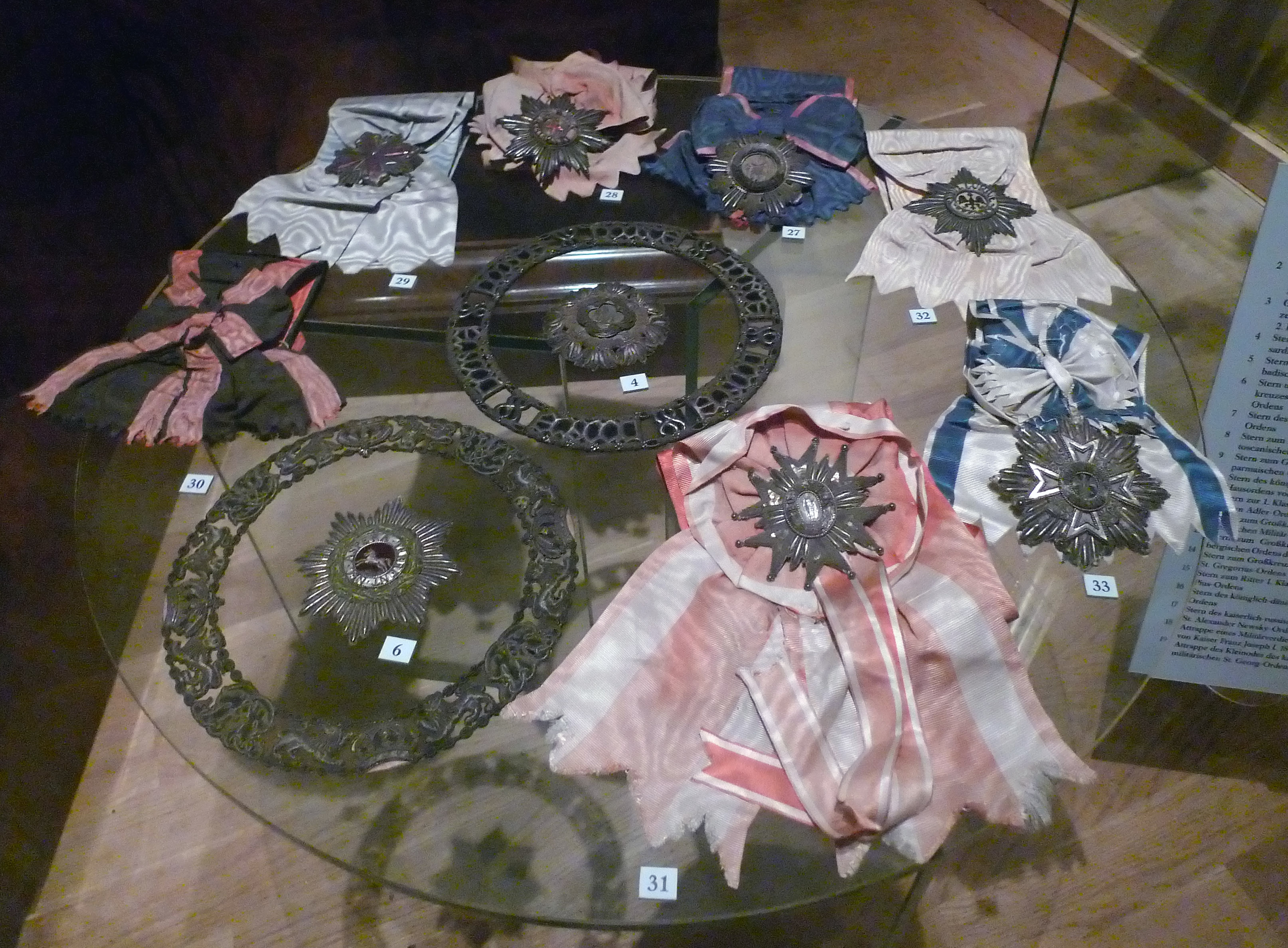
Some of the about 40 decorations of Radetzky on display at the Heeresgeschichtliches Museum, Vienna

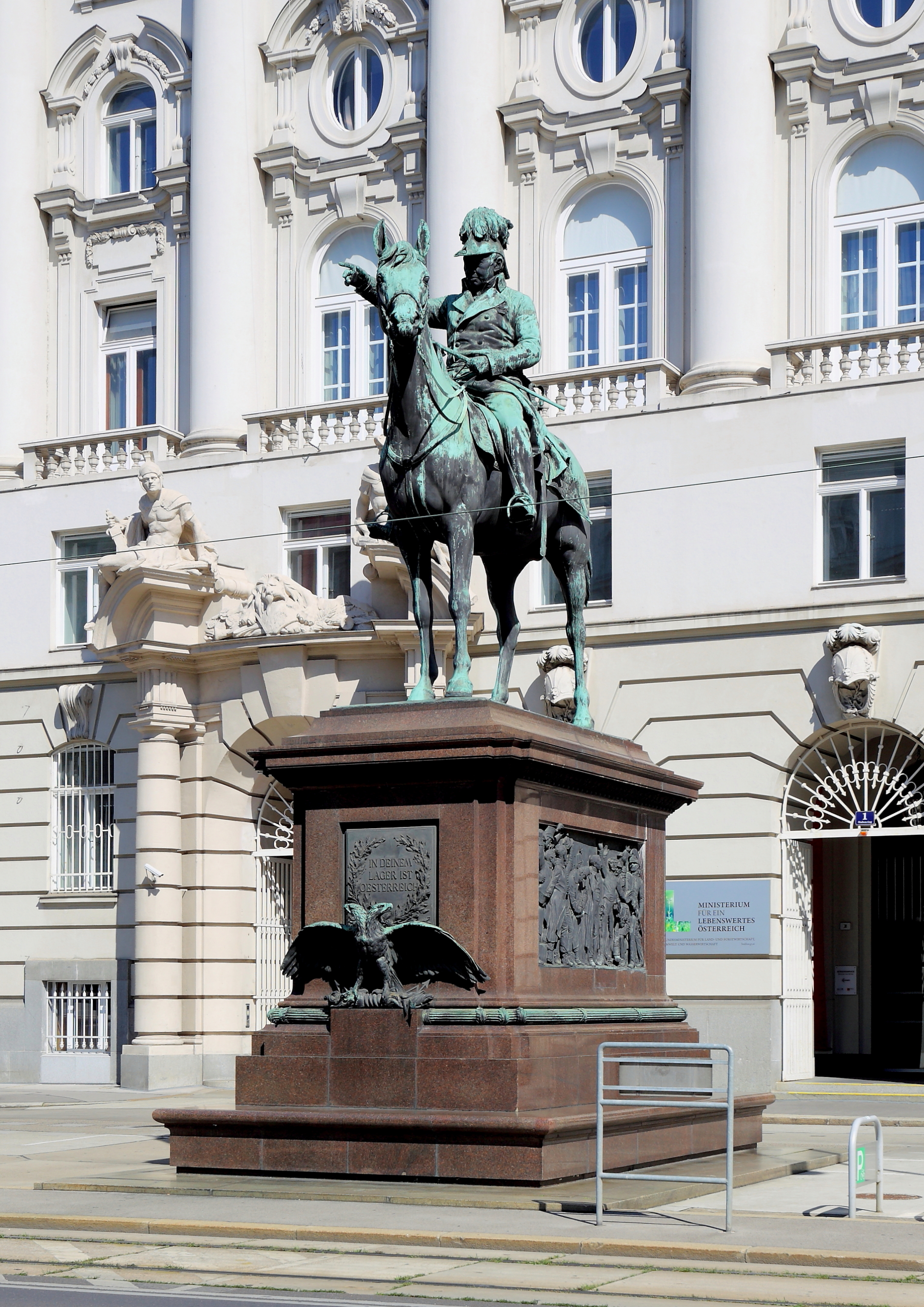
Radetsky Memorial in front of the former War Ministry on the Stubenring. The memorial was formerly situated on the Am Hof square, in the old city of Vienna.

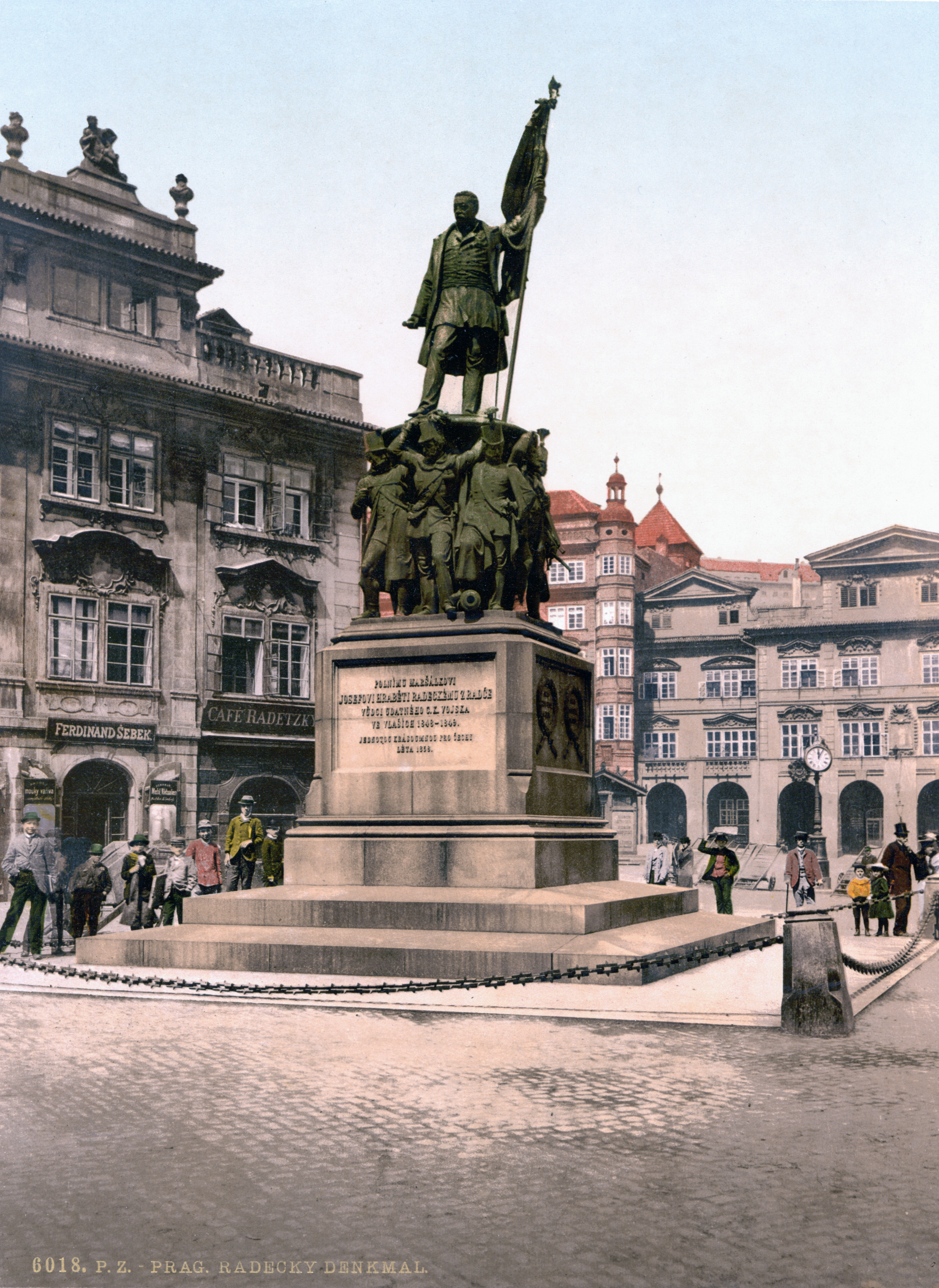
Radetzky Memorial in Prague in 1900

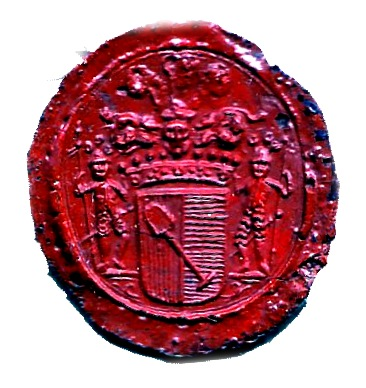
Personal seal

== Honours ==
He received the following orders and decorations:

- Austria:
  - Knight of the Military Order of Maria Theresa, 1801; Commander, 1809 Grand Cross, 1848
  - Knight of the Golden Fleece, 1849
  - Grand Cross of the Royal Hungarian Order of St. Stephen, in Diamonds, 1851
  - Grand Cross of the Imperial Order of Leopold
  - Knight of the Iron Crown, 1st Class
  - Military Merit Cross
- Russia:
  - Knight of St. George, 3rd Class, 8 October 1813; 1st Class, 27 August 1848
  - Knight of St. Alexander Nevsky, 1814
  - Knight of St. Andrew, 18 March 1839; in Diamonds, 1846
  - Knight of St. Anna, 1st Class
  - Knight of the White Eagle
  - Honor Sword "for Bravery", in Diamonds
- Baden: Grand Cross of the Zähringer Lion, 1815
- Bavaria:
  - Grand Cross of the Military Order of Max Joseph, 27 February 1814
  - Knight of St. Hubert, 1849
- Hanover:
  - Grand Cross of the Royal Guelphic Order, 1817
  - Knight of St. George, 1848
- Parma:
  - Senator Grand Cross of the Constantinian Order of St. George, in Diamonds, 1833
  - Grand Cross of St. Louis for Civil Merit, in Diamonds, 1849
  - Grand Cross of St. George for Military Merit
- Sardinia:
  - Knight of the Annunciation, 13 September 1838
  - Grand Cross of Saints Maurice and Lazarus
- Prussia:
  - Knight of the Black Eagle, 9 September 1847; in Diamonds, 6 May 1849
  - Knight of the Red Eagle, 1st Class with Swords
- Denmark: Knight of the Elephant, 28 October 1849
- Two Sicilies: Grand Cross of St. Ferdinand and Merit, 1849
- Hesse-Darmstadt: Grand Cross of the Ludwig Order, 11 May 1851
- Saxony: Knight of the Rue Crown, 1851
- Württemberg:
  - Grand Cross of the Württemberg Crown, 1851
  - Grand Cross of the Military Merit Order, 26 August 1851
- France: Grand Cross of the Military Order of St. Louis
- Greece: Grand Cross of the Redeemer
- Holy See:
  - Grand Cross of St. Gregory the Great
  - Grand Cross of the Order of Pope Pius IX, in Diamonds
- Modena: Grand Cross of the Eagle of Este
- Tuscany:
  - Grand Cross of St. Joseph
  - Knight of the Military Merit Order, 1st Class

== Ancestry ==
Ancestors of Joseph Radetzky von Radetz

8. Baron Petr Eusebius Viktorin Radecký z Radče
4. Count Václav Leopold Radecký z Radče
9. Marie Polyxena von Heusenstamm
2. Count Peter Eusebius Radetzky von Radetz
10. František Mikuláš Bzenský z Prorubě
5. Anna Bzenská z Prorubě
11. Anna Marie Straková z Nedabylic
1. Count Joseph Radetzky von Radetz
12. Baron František Leopold Bechinie z Lažan
6. Baron Ignác Ladislav Bechinie z Lažan
13. Marie Magdalena Sohier von der Windmühl
3. Baroness Marie Venantia Bechinie von Lažan
14. Count Leopold Ignác Věžník z Věžníku
7. Countess Marie Františka Věžníková z Věžníku
15. Marie Alžběta z Valdštejna

== Works ==
- Joseph Radetzky von Radetz: Denkschriften militärisch-politischen Inhalts aus dem handschriftlichen Nachlass des k.k. österreichischen Feldmarschalls Grafen Radetzky. Stuttgart: J. G. Cotta, 1858

=== Correspondence ===
- Joseph Radetzky von Radetz: Briefe des Feldmarschalls Radetzky an seine Tochter Friederike 1847–1857; aus dem Archiv der freiherrlichen Familie Walterskirchen hrsg. von Bernhard Duhr: Festschrift der Leo-Gesellschaft zur feierlichen Enthüllung des Radetzsky-Denkmals in Wien. Wien: J. Roller, 1892.

These are Radetzky's letters to his daughter Friederike Radetzky von Radetz, Gräfin Wenckheim, published to celebrate the unveiling of the Radetzky monument in Vienna.
