= Marino, Lazio =

Marino
- Comune
- Comune di Marino
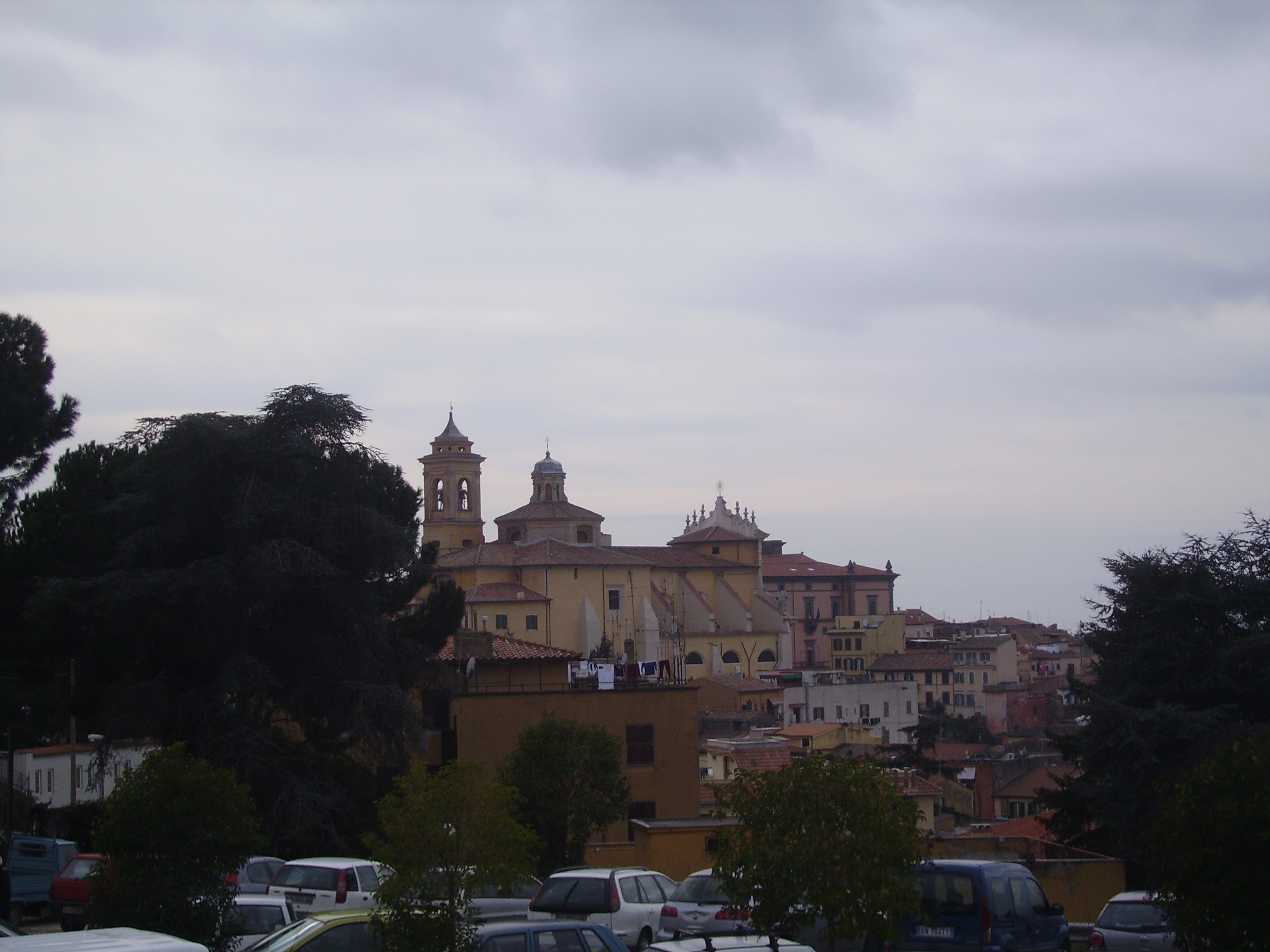
- View of the historical centre

- Coat of arms

- Location of Marino in the Metropolitan City of Rome

- Location within Lazio Location within Italy Location within European Union
- Coordinates: 41°46′N 12°40′E
- Country: Italy
- Region: Lazio
- Metropolitan city: Rome (RM)
- Frazioni: Castelluccia, Cava dei Selci, Due Santi, Fontana Sala, Frattocchie, Santa Maria delle Mole

Government
  - Mayor: Carlo Colizza

Area
  - Total: 26.10 km^{2} (10.08 sq mi)
- Elevation: 360 m (1,180 ft)

Population (31 May 2025)
  - Total: 46,676
  - Density: 1,788/km^{2} (4,632/sq mi)
- Demonym: Marinesi
- Time zone: UTC+1 (CET)
  - Summer (DST): UTC+2 (CEST)
- Postal code: 00047
- Dialing code: 06
- Patron saint: San Barnaba
- Saint day: 11 June
- Website: Official website

Marino (Latin: Marinum or Castrimoenium, Marino dialect: Marini) is an Italian comune with 46,676 inhabitants located in the Metropolitan City of Rome Capital in Lazio.

Situated south of the capital, on the Alban Hills in the area of the Roman Castles, nestled between Rocca di Papa, Castel Gandolfo, and Grottaferrata, the town was a significant military outpost on the Ager Romanus throughout the Middle Ages, a popular vacation destination, and an important commercial hub due to its strategic position on the highway between Rome and Naples, which was frequented until the reopening of the faster Via Appia Nuova around 1780.

Primarily associated with viticulture, Marino is the birthplace of the eponymous white wine with Denominazione di Origine Controllata status, and its name is tied to the renowned Wine Festival, the oldest event of its kind in Italy. It has a distinctive dialect, different from that of the Roman Castles, the Marino dialect.

== Geography ==
=== Territory ===
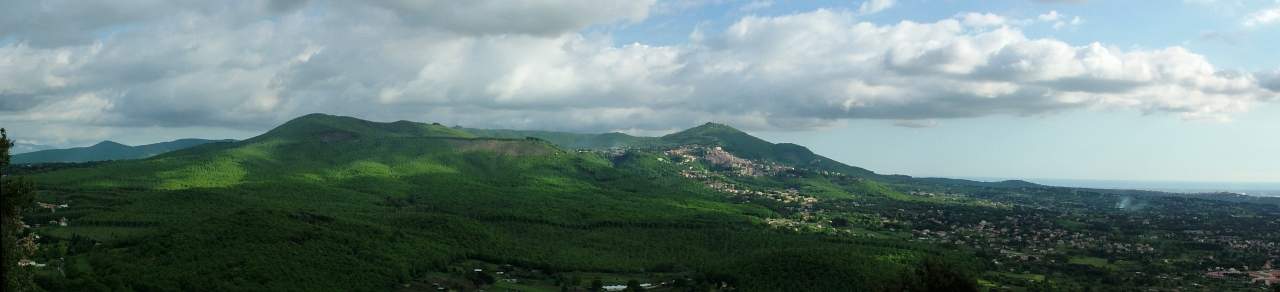
The Alban Hills today: the remnants of the volcanic crater of the Latium Volcano, which covered an area of approximately 1,600 square kilometres (620 sq mi), are clearly visible in the current orography.

The municipal territory of Marino, spanning 26.10 square kilometres (10.08 sq mi), is the sixth largest among the municipalities of the Roman Castles, following Velletri (113.21 km^{2}), Lanuvio (43.91 km^{2}), Rocca di Papa (40.18 km^{2}), Rocca Priora (28.07 km^{2}), and Lariano (27 km^{2}).

Some modifications to Marino's territory were made under the rule of the Colonna family: in 1453, a dispute arose over boundaries with the territories of the Abbey of Santa Maria di Grottaferrata, which was definitively resolved only in the 17th century with Marino relinquishing all claims to the locality of Castel de' Paolis, which had belonged to the abbey since the 11th century despite being located within Marino's territory. In 1399, during a brief period of direct ecclesiastical rule over Marino under the pontificate of Pope Boniface IX, the castellany of Marino was combined with that of Genzano di Roma, which at the time included the deserted territory of Ariccia. Another short-lived territorial expansion occurred during the Napoleonic occupation (1807–1814), when Grottaferrata was incorporated into the canton of Marino.

In 1833, Marino's territory measured 1932 rubbia, equivalent to 35.71 square kilometres (13.79 sq mi) (calculated as 1.848438 hectares per rubbio), which included the current territory of Ciampino, which became independent in 1974. A further reduction in municipal territory occurred between 1993 and 1994 during the brief existence of the autonomous municipality of Boville. The reintegration of this municipality, comprising the frazioni of Castelluccia, Cava dei Selci, Due Santi, Fontana Sala, Frattocchie, and Santa Maria delle Mole, was mandated by the Constitutional Court with ruling no. 433 of 6 September 1995, because:

[...] It is one thing to establish a small or moderately sized hamlet as an autonomous municipality, leaving the original municipality still larger, as in the case currently under review by the Court; it is another thing entirely to establish a vast portion of an existing municipality's territory as an autonomous municipality, as happened in the case of Marino. In that case, it would have been absurd not to consult the entire population of Marino, precisely because Marino, after the secession of Boville, would have become something other than what it was. [...]

— Constitutional Court Ruling No. 43 of 10 February 2003 on the detachment of the hamlet of Baranzate from the municipality of Bollate, in the Province of Milan.

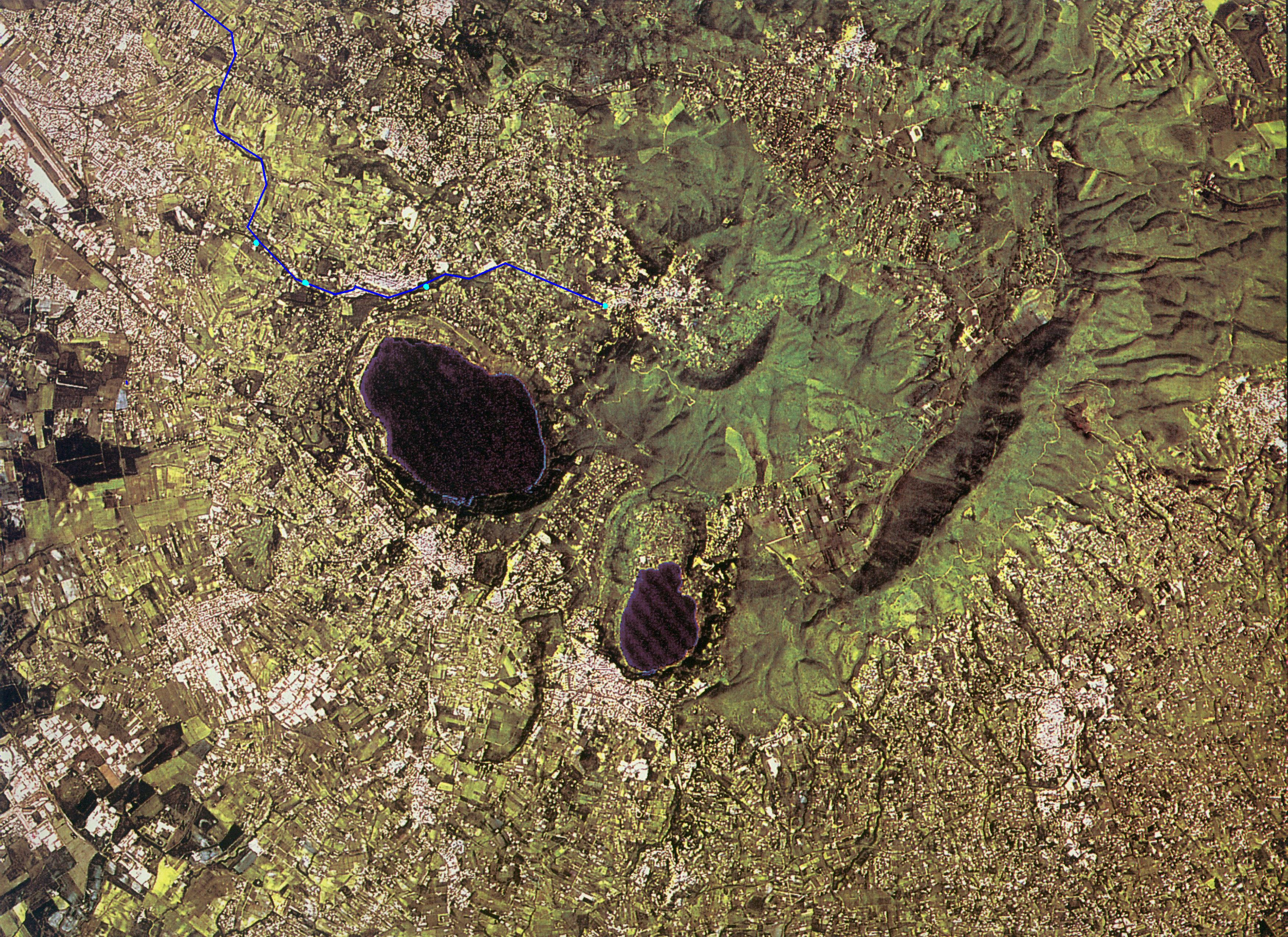
The Roman Castles in a satellite photo from the 1990s: the Lake Albano and Lake Nemi are visible, and to the north of the former, the center of Marino.

The territory of Marino, like that of the entire Alban Hills area, was subject to the activity of the Latium Volcano between approximately 600,000 and 20,000 years ago. The soil is predominantly composed of volcanic material, with abundant characteristic minerals such as peperino, whose extraction was a hallmark of Marino until the 1960s. To a lesser extent, sperone stone and tuff are found, more frequently in the Tusculan-Artemisian area.

According to the Geological Map of Italy compiled by the Italian Geological Service, most of Marino's territory is geologically composed of "pyroclastic explosion breccias, with lapilli, leucocratic and ultramafic projectiles, biotitic pyroxenites, xenoliths of leucitic lava and substrate (Middle Pleistocene clays, marls, and Paleogene sandstones, Mesozoic limestones transformed into marble by metamorphism), facies with cineritic upper layers, in stratified layers and more or less consolidated banks, rapidly thinning away from emission centers," in other words, peperino formed from consolidated lava emitted by the volcanic crater of Lake Albano.

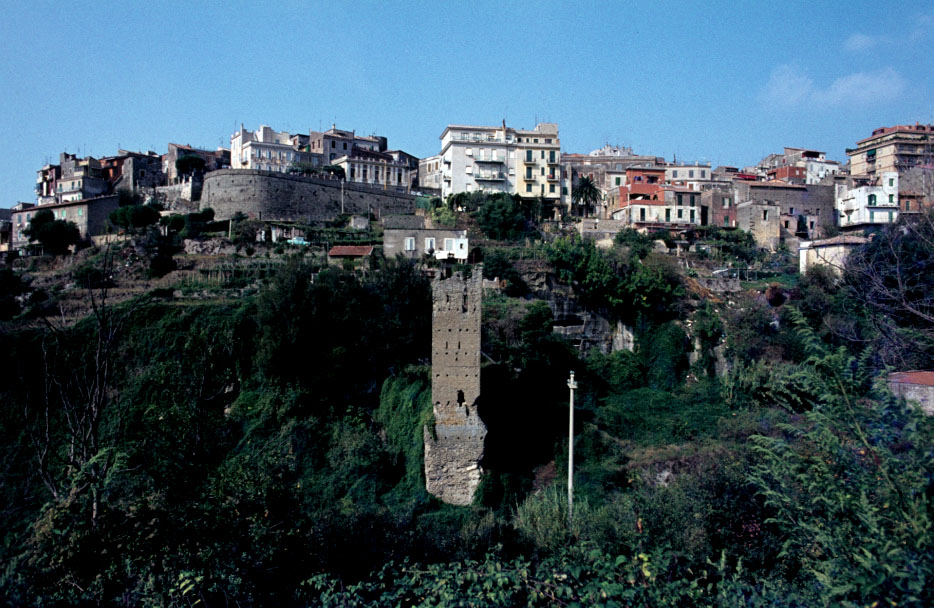
Panorama of Marino

Santa Maria delle Mole, Fontana Sala, and the locality of Tor Messer Paoli are situated on banks of lava flows, in this case overlying leucitic-tephritic and nephelinic lava. The Coste district in the center of Marino and the locality of Santa Fumia, located at the southern borders of the municipality with Castel Gandolfo and Rome, are on soil composed of lava masses. Monte Crescenzo, finally, is characteristically composed of "welded lava, scoria, agglomerates, and stratified lapilli," typical of an eccentric eruptive vent. The Pantanelle locality, at the northern borders with Grottaferrata and Ciampino, is composed of alluvial material, likely transported by the Patatona ditch.

- Seismic classification: Zone 3 (low seismicity).

==== Hydrography ====
Although the municipality of Marino is not traversed by significant watercourses, numerous small torrential streams, known as "marane" or "ditches," flow within its borders. The most historically significant is the Patatona ditch, also called "Pietrare ditch" or "San Bonaventura." This watercourse originates in the territory of Rocca di Papa, enters Marino's territory through the Barco Colonna, skirts the Peperino Quarries district, and continues toward Ciampino, where it meets the Acqua Marciana ditch from Grottaferrata, together continuing through the urban area of Morena, originally to reach the Tiber via the Cloaca Maxima, but since the post-war period, it has been diverted further south near Magliana. Its waters were supposedly fed by the legendary Caput Aquae Ferentinum, a sacred spring dedicated to the dea indiges Ferentina, near which the Locus Ferentinum was located, and where Tarquinius Superbus had the Ariccian delegate Turnus Herdonius drowned during a dramatic meeting of the Latin League in 651 BC.

Other watercourses, relevant for understanding the hydrogeology of a territory undergoing dense urban development, include the Fiorano ditch, originating in the hamlet of Cava dei Selci and flowing northwest; the Scopette ditch, starting in the Boscare locality near the hamlet of Santa Maria delle Mole and continuing east as the Fioranello ditch; the Giostra ditch, flowing east from Colle Granato near the hamlet of Frattocchie; and the Montelungo ditch, flowing east from Mezzamagna near the hamlet of Castelluccia to join the Torre ditch or "Priests’ ditch" from the hamlet of Pavona in the municipality of Castel Gandolfo.

==== Orography ====
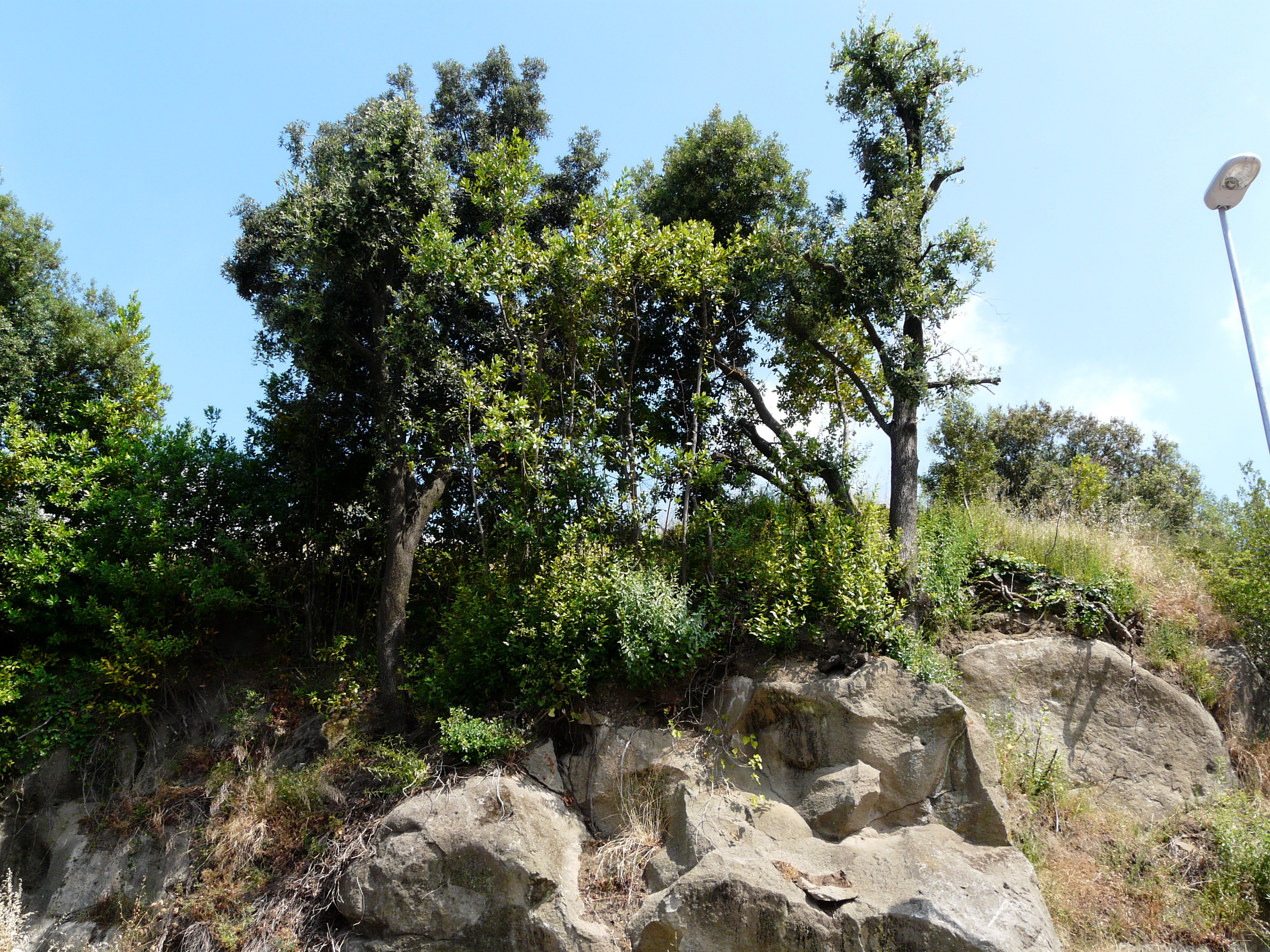
Vegetation growing on peperino in the Colle Licia locality at kilometer 5 of the Strada statale 217 Via dei Laghi.

There are no true mountain peaks in Marino's territory, as the maximum elevation never reaches 600 metres above sea level. The highest elevations are recorded in the eastern part of the municipality, near the borders with Rocca di Papa at the slopes of Monte Cavo (949 m above sea level), an ancient volcanic crater active during the "second phase" of the Latium Volcano, approximately between 270,000 and 100,000 years ago. The localities of Costa Caselle and Prato della Corte reach 438 metres (1,437 ft) and 427 metres (1,401 ft) above sea level, respectively.

The center of Marino, situated "on a small peperino hill" vaguely shaped like an "L," reaches its highest elevation in the San Rocco locality at 389 metres (1,276 ft) above sea level, gradually descending to 376 metres (1,234 ft) above sea level in the Villa Desideri district, 373 metres (1,224 ft) above sea level in Piazza Giacomo Matteotti, 335 metres (1,099 ft) above sea level at Palazzo Colonna, and finally 319 metres (1,047 ft) above sea level in the Paolina locality.

Other notable elevations are found in the southern part of the municipality, near the borders with Castel Gandolfo, along the edge of the flooded volcanic crater represented by Lake Albano (also active during the "second phase" of the Latium Volcano): the Villini locality is at 368 metres (1,207 ft) above sea level, while the nearby Monte Crescenzo, likely a secondary volcanic vent, stands at 379 metres (1,243 ft) above sea level.

The rest of the territory is shaped by the gentle slope of the volcanic terrains of the Alban Hills toward the vast plain of the Ager Romanus. Regarding the elevation of the municipal hamlets, Santa Maria delle Mole is at 147 metres above sea level, Cava dei Selci at 151 metres (495 ft) above sea level, Frattocchie at 173 metres (568 ft) above sea level, Fontana Sala at 186 metres (610 ft) above sea level, Due Santi at 222 metres (728 ft) above sea level, and Castelluccia at 200 metres (660 ft) above sea level.

=== Climate ===
The climate of the Roman Castles has been considered healthy since antiquity, due to their hilly position at generally moderate elevations. The temperature range between the center of Marino and, for example, Rome Urbe, is virtually negligible, although Marino experiences slightly less humidity.

In the Castles area, minimum temperatures range between 9 °C and 12 °C, while maximum temperatures are between 15 °C and 22 °C. The most significant temperature variations occur in autumn and spring, while regarding precipitation, the Roman Castles fall within the mesomediterranean zone, with a peak in November and a marked decrease between July and August, totaling an average of 942 millimeters. However, the highest precipitation is recorded in the area near the Lazio coast in a south-southwest direction, gradually decreasing inland due to the barrier posed by the Alban Hills, a phenomenon known as orographic lift.

The Castles are typically affected by sirocco and libeccio winds, coming from the Tyrrhenian Sea from the south and southwest, respectively, but occasionally the "ponentino," a westerly wind characteristic of Rome and the coastal areas of Central Italy, also appears. In winter, tramontane and gregale winds blow from the north and northeast across the vast plain of the Ager Romanus. During this period, occasional snowfalls may occur, though they are generally brief and without significant accumulation.

- Climate classification: Zone D, 1966 HDD (12 hours of heating daily from 1 November to 15 April).

== Etymology ==
The origin of the toponym "Marino" is unclear. In the 15th and 16th centuries, scholars commonly believed it was linked to a hypothetical Roman villa belonging to Gaius Marius, supposedly located at the site of the current historic center (indeed, archaeological finds compatible with a Roman-era villa were discovered in the 19th century in the Borgo Garibaldi district). Among others, Pope Pius II, in a passage of his "Commentarii" regarding his trip to the Alban Hills in 1462, supported this theory. Other hypotheses include a derivation from "Marianum" in the sense of a place dedicated to the Virgin Mary (the Sanctuary of Santa Maria dell'Acquasanta has rather ancient origins, dating back to around the 6th century), or from "Maranum", related to the "marana" or Patatona ditch, or even to the name of an ancient feudal lord, Marino or Marina, whose memory has been lost.

It is also unclear when this name first appeared in history, as suspected interpolations in the "Liber Pontificalis", dated to the time of the empire of Constantine I (306–337) during the pontificate of Pope Sylvester I (314–335), and in the "Chronicon Sublacense", dated to 1090, are generally discounted. The first certain document mentioning Marino is thus a notarial act from 1114, drawn up by a certain "Tedemarius abitatoris in castri qui vocatur Mareni" ("Tedemarius, resident in the castle called Marino").

== History ==
=== Ancient Era (900 BC–476 AD) ===
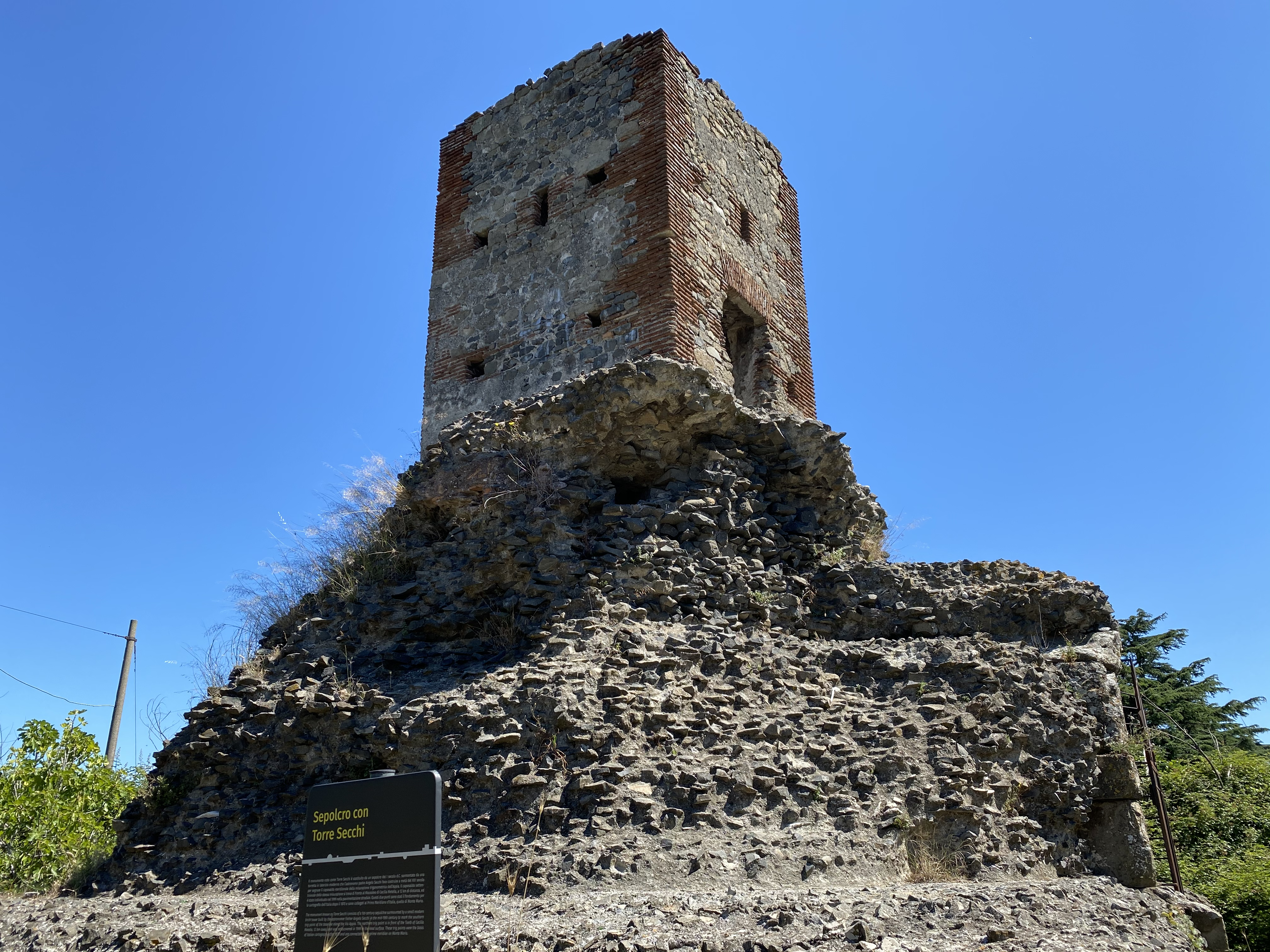
The Roman tomb on which, in the Middle Ages, the tower known as Leonardo was built, along the Via Appia Antica in the Frattocchie locality.

The earliest human settlements in Marino's territory date back to the 1st millennium BC, during the Latial Period II A (900 BC–830 BC). Finds from the Latial Period III (770 BC–730 BC) were discovered in the necropolis of Riserva Del Truglio, which reached its peak development during the Latial Period IV A (730 BC–640 BC). Around thirty tombs from this period, found in Marino's territory, form one of the most significant concentrations of tombs in the Alban Hills. Additionally, near the Marino railway station in the Peperino Quarries locality, the foundation of a hut from this period was uncovered, representing one of the rare examples of its kind in Lazio.

In pre-Roman historical times, several settlements arose in Marino's territory:

- Mugillae, a Latin settlement near the hamlet of Santa Maria delle Mole, was razed by the Volsci led by Gnaeus Marcius Coriolanus in 490 BC.
- Bovillae, a Latin city whose location is debated between the Colle Licia locality and the hamlet of Frattocchie; it served as a refuge for inhabitants displaced from Alba Longa after its destruction in 658 BC and was the origin of the Gens Julia. Emperor Tiberius Claudius Nero established the Sodales Augustales there in 14 AD, constructing a large circus and theater.
- Locus Ferentinus, the forum of the Latin city of Alba Longa, capital of the Latin League, was also the site of periodic assemblies of representatives from the thirty-six confederated cities. The most widely accepted hypothesis places it in the Prato della Corte locality, outside the hypothetical urban area of Alba Longa and near the legendary Caput Aquae Ferentinum. However, recent theories suggest the Locus may have been located in the Cecchina hamlet of Albano Laziale.

In Roman times, likely for military purposes, the fortified settlement of Castrimoenium was established, probably located in the current historic center, specifically in the Castelletto district. From Castrimoenium, the Aqua Taepula, an aqueduct supplying several thousand cubic meters of water to Rome, originated. In 1962, the Mithraeum of Marino was discovered near the Marino railway station, one of the best-preserved mithraea in the world and one of only two with wall paintings in Italy.

=== Middle Ages ===
==== Early Middle Ages ====
Before the fall of the Western Roman Empire (476 AD), Bovillae was already in advanced decline, as evidenced by the absence of written or documentary sources about the municipium after the 1st century. Although the area saw some paleochristian finds (an oratory with fragmentary remains uncovered in the 18th century near Frattocchie and a catacomb found in Due Santi in the 18th century, whose location is now lost), the gradual abandonment of the Via Appia Antica after the 6th century and frequent Saracen pirate raids in the 9th and 10th century favored the emergence of new settlements higher up, such as Marino.

From the 8th century, the papacy took control of the temporal governance of Lazio and, to ensure agricultural supply and territorial control, established several patrimonia and domuscultae composed of scattered agricultural massae and fundi. In Marino's territory, there were some detached estates belonging to the patrimonium Appiae and the massae Marulis, likely centered in Grottaferrata near the 12th mile of the Via Latina, and Sulpiciana, extending along the Via Nettunense from Frattocchie to Castel Savello near Albano Laziale, founded by Pope Adrian I.

==== Late Middle Ages ====
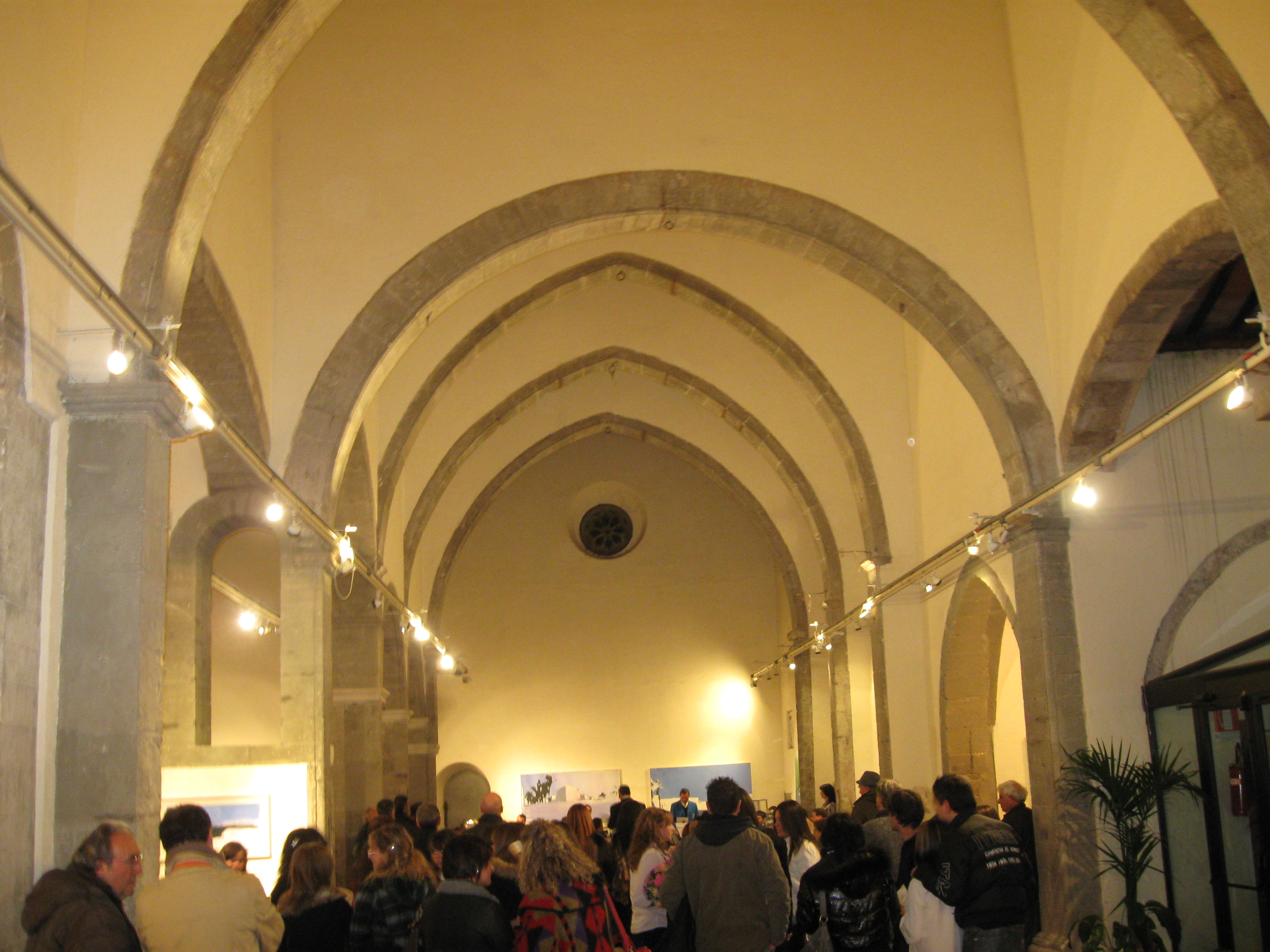
The former Church of Santa Lucia, built in the eponymous district around the early 11th century and rebuilt in Gothic style in the 13th century, possibly commissioned by Jacoba of Settesoli, has housed the Umberto Mastroianni Civic Museum since 2000.

It is hypothesized that in the 11th century, Marino's territory came under the influence of the Counts of Tusculum, a powerful Roman baronial family based in nearby Tusculum, which exerted significant control over Rome between 999 and 1179 through a "family papacy". The Counts of Tusculum likely first fortified the hill of the center of Marino, as they did in other centers of the Alban Hills. The earliest mention of the castle, however, dates to 1090, regarding its concession by Agapito of the Counts of Tusculum as a dowry to his daughter, married to Oddone Frangipane, along with the castles of Rocca di Papa and Monte Compatri. This information may be a later interpolation, added to provide legal basis for a probable usurpation of the fief by the newly noble Frangipane, who, by the 13th century, fully governed Marino.

In 1237, the feudal lady Jacoba of Settesoli, widow of Graziano Frangipane and a friend of Saint Francis of Assisi, as well as an inspiration for the Third Order Regular of Saint Francis, granted Marino's community its first statutes. The Frangipane remained in Marino until the death of her son, Giovanni Frangipane, who, in his 1253 will, divided his assets among the San Saba Abbey in Rome and the Abbey of Santa Maria di Grottaferrata, with a portion also allocated to Marino's poor. After a brief usurpation of the fief by the Counts of Poli, in 1266, Cardinal Matteo Rubeo Orsini purchased Marino "et turrim cum ipsius tenimento suo" for 13,000 provisini.

Under the Orsini rule, the castle was besieged in 1267 by the Ghibelline "senator" Henry of Castile and in 1347 by the people's tribune Cola di Rienzo, both times unsuccessfully. With the onset of the Western Schism (1378–1417), Pope Urban VI and Antipope Clement VII deployed two mercenary armies, which clashed in the decisive Battle of Marino (30 April 1379), won by the papal mercenaries led by Alberico da Barbiano.

Following the Battle of Marino, the castle's feudal lord, Giordano Orsini, a follower of the antipope, was expelled by his son Giacomo, who retained control until 1385, when he was ousted by the legitimate heir, his cousin Onorato Caetani. Throughout the Western Schism, Marino was subject to rapid conquests and reconquests by various figures: notably, between 1399 and 1405, it was directly controlled by the Apostolic Camera, from 1408 to 1414, it was occupied by Ladislaus I of Naples, who granted it to Giordano and Niccolò Colonna, before returning to the Caetani, who sold it to the Colonna in 1419 for 12,000 florins.

The Colonna frequently used Marino's castle as a military base, involving it in numerous conflicts: between 1433 and 1436 in the war between Pope Eugene IV and certain Roman baronial families, ending with the destruction of Palestrina and the Colonna's exile to the Kingdom of Naples; in 1482 and 1484–1486 in the war between Pope Sixtus IV, and later Pope Innocent VIII, and Ferdinand I of Naples, fought fiercely but resolved in a Status quo ante bellum; and in 1494–1495 during tensions related to Charles VIII of France’s descent into Italy, where the Colonna opposed the French, supported by Pope Alexander VI. Tensions with this pope culminated in Marino’s destruction, decreed with papal consent on 8 July 1501. This event, according to 20th-century historian and archaeologist Giuseppe Tomassetti, marks the end of Marino’s medieval history.

=== From the 16th to the 18th century ===
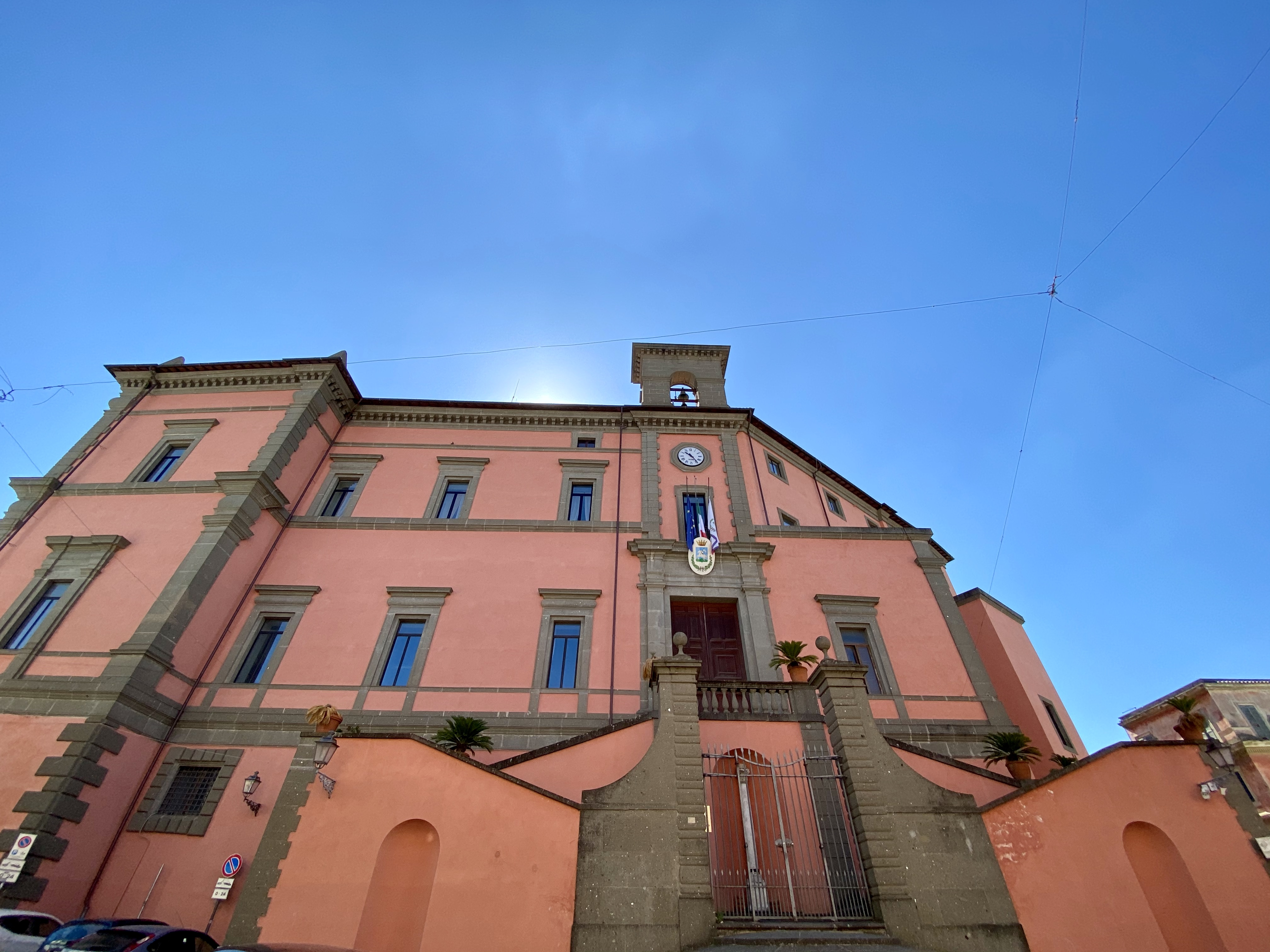
The northern facade of Palazzo Colonna: the urban plan conceived by Ascanio I Colonna (likely for Charles V’s visit to Rome in 1532) was likely inspired by Antonio da Sangallo the Younger's work for the Farnese family in Caprarola.

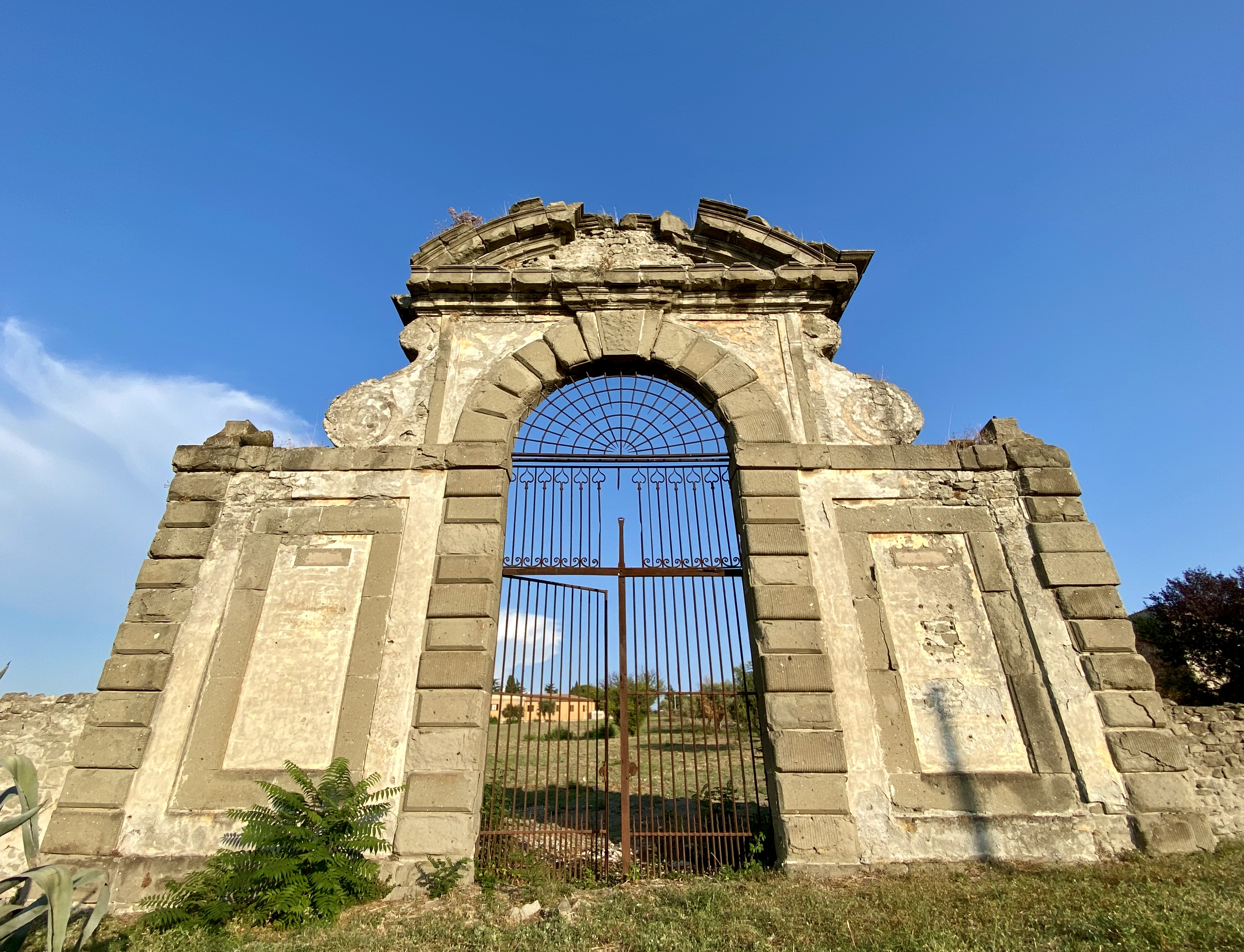
The 17th-century "Cancellone" (gate) of Villa Colonna, later Colizza on Via Romana.

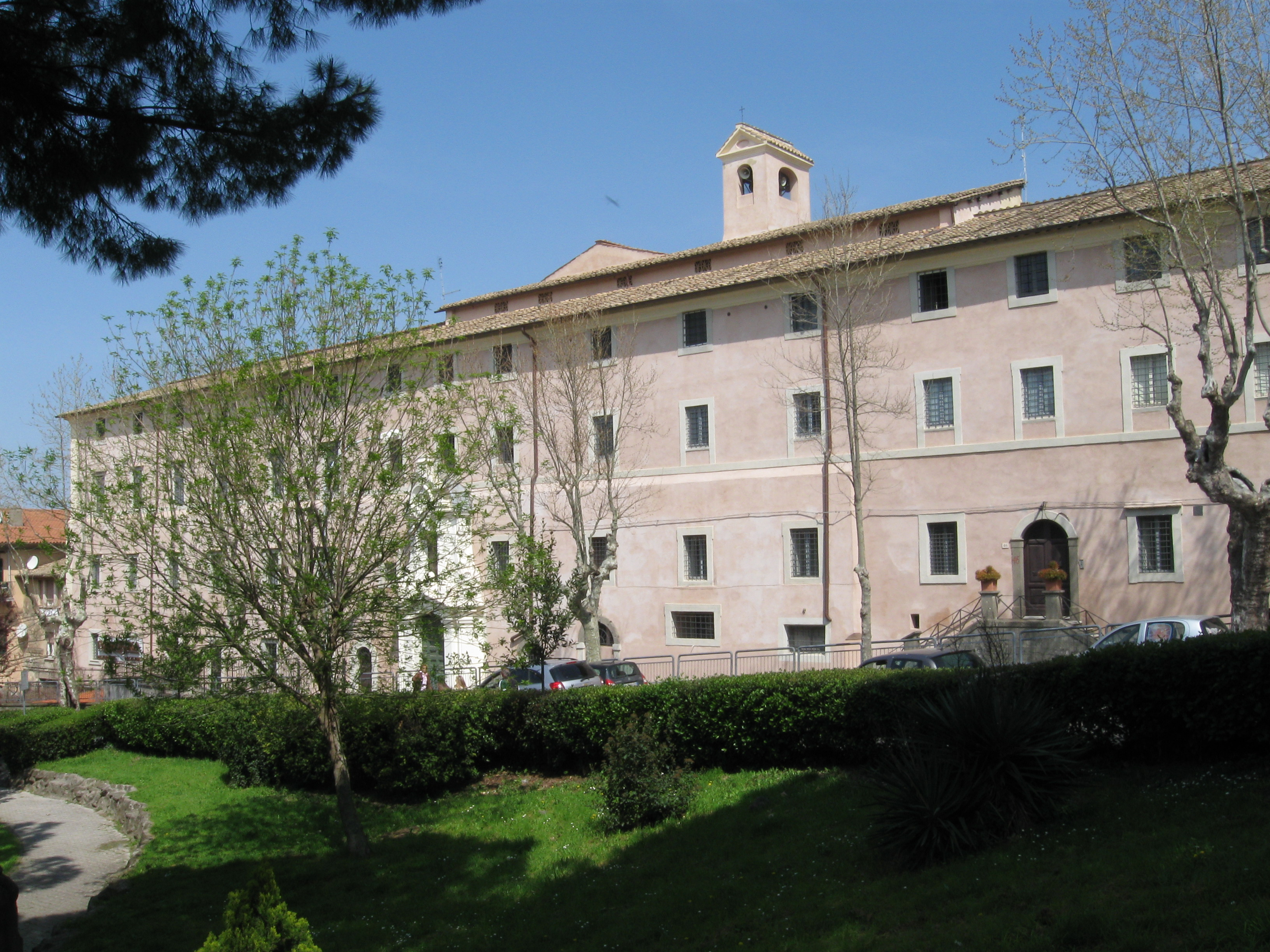
The Convent of the Most Holy Rosary in the Borgo Garibaldi district, inhabited by Dominican nuns, founded in 1675.

Pope Alexander VI, with the papal brief "Coelestis altitudinis potentiae" of 1 October 1501, granted the fief of Marino, along with thirty-six other Lazio fiefs seized from the Colonna and Savelli, to his nephew Giovanni, likely the illegitimate son of his daughter Lucrezia Borgia and one of her lovers, Pedro Calderón. Due to the recipient's young age, the administration of his fiefs was entrusted to Cardinal Archbishop of Cosenza Francesco Borgia. However, upon Alexander VI's death in 1503, Fabrizio I Colonna regained possession of the castle.

Marino faced further conflicts in 1526, when it was razed by order of Pope Clement VII along with the Colonna fiefs of Zagarolo, Gallicano, Artena, Subiaco, and Cave, prompting the Colonna to retaliate by supporting Charles V’s army in the Sack of Rome in 1527. Subsequently, the Colonna fought again in 1539 (the "Salt War") against Pope Paul III and in 1556–1559 against Pope Paul IV, before Marcantonio II Colonna swore solemn allegiance to Pope Julius III in 1550, ending minor internal wars between the papacy and Roman barons.

Under Marcantonio II Colonna, the victorious papal admiral at the Battle of Lepanto in 1571, Marino saw significant social and urban reforms: in 1564, the Marinese Community's seal, depicting a knight bearing a banner (largely unchanged over centuries), appeared for the first time; similar to the current coat of arms of Marino, in 1566, new statutes were issued, and in 1572, "Bandi, provisioni et ordinationi" addressed gambling, blasphemy, and brawling; a quarter of Palazzo Colonna was completed, a project commissioned by Marcantonio's father, Ascanio I Colonna, to Antonio da Sangallo the Younger.

Marcantonio II Colonna was succeeded by Cardinal Ascanio II Colonna, whose governance was unpopular, leading to a 1599 rebellion by the Marinese. However, in 1606, Pope Paul V elevated Marino's fief to a duchy in his favor, with hereditary rights.

Tradition holds that in 1618, the Marinese, gathered in a public assembly, chose Saint Barnabas the Apostle as the town's new patron saint, beginning the Saint Barnabas patronal festival on 11 June. The 17th century was a period of significant urban development: around 1636, the Church of the Most Holy Trinity was built, between 1640 and 1662, the Basilica of Saint Barnabas, after which the old parishes of Santa Lucia and San Giovanni were deconsecrated, Corso Trieste (then called "Strada Larga") was opened, and in 1632, Pompeo Castiglia, following architect Sergio Venturi's design, built the Fountain of the Four Moors.

The 1656 plague severely struck Marino, decimating over half the population. The last Marinese statutes were drafted in 1675 and approved in 1677 by Lorenzo Onofrio Colonna. He also built the Convent of the Most Holy Rosary, completed in 1712 in Rococo style.

The most significant event of the 18th century for Marino, negatively, was the reopening of the Via Appia Nuova, promoted by Pope Pius VI between 1777 and 1780. This faster alternative to the longer road to Naples via Marino, the Convent of Santa Maria ad Nives in Palazzolo, and Velletri diminished Marino's role as a commercial and rest stop, while boosting towns along the Appia route such as Albano Laziale and Genzano di Roma.

Following the proclamation of the Roman Republic (1798–1799) (15 February 1798), several towns of the Alban Hills declared themselves "sister republics": Albano, Frascati, and Velletri on 18 February, Marino only in early March. However, when Trastevere residents rose against the French on 20 February, Albano and Velletri promptly joined the reaction, sending thousands of troops against Rome. Marino and Frascati remained loyal to the revolution. The battle between French and reactionaries occurred near Frattocchie on 28 February 1798, with the French, led by Joachim Murat, victorious, sacking Castel Gandolfo and Albano. Jean-Étienne Championnet, the French commander in Rome, commended the Marinese for their loyalty. However, this loyalty led to the sacking of Marino by the Sanfedist Neapolitan "liberation" army, which expelled the French in 1799.

=== The 19th century ===
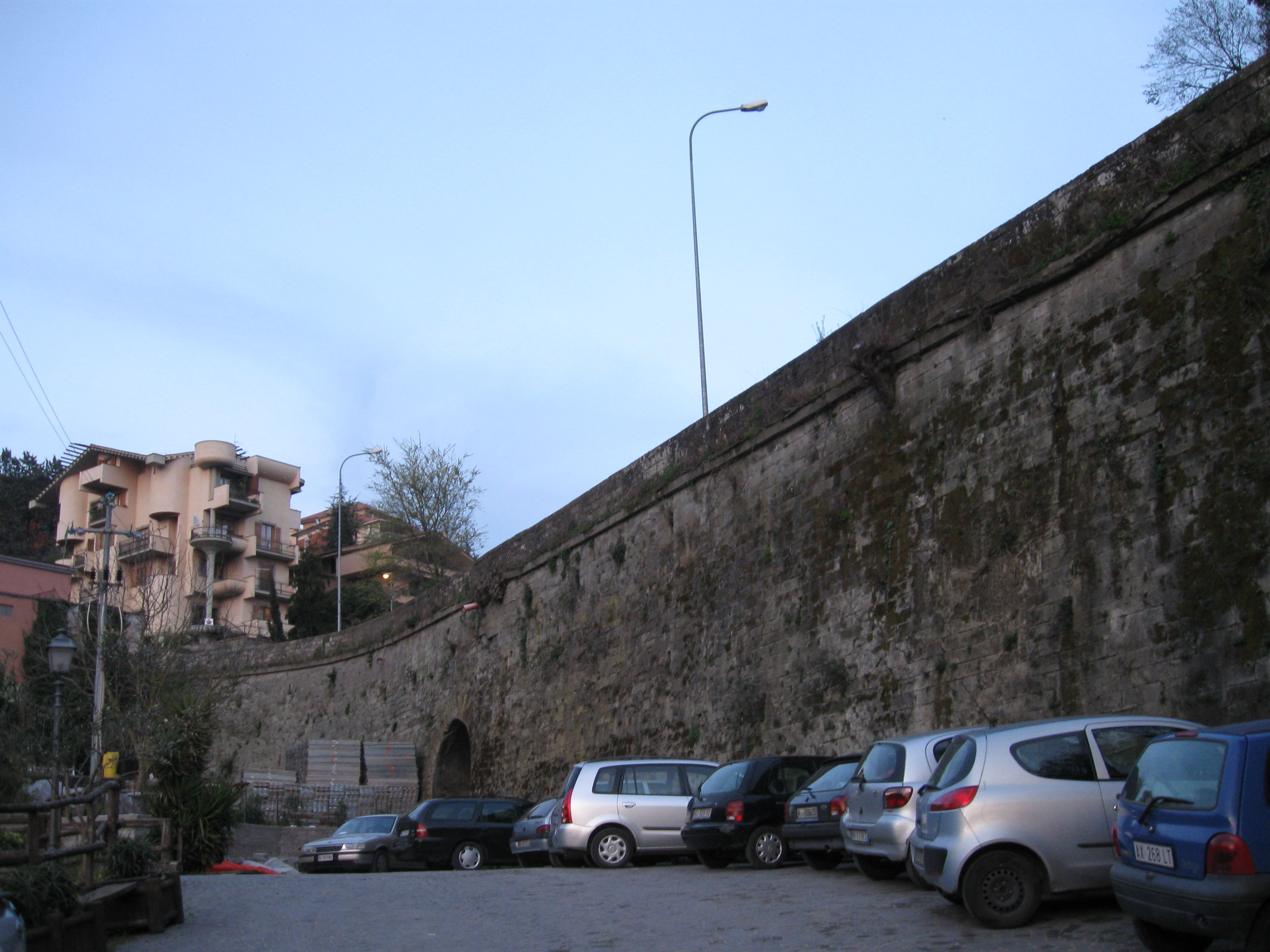
The initial section of the "Gregorian Bridge" in the Acquasanta district.

With the return of Napoleon Bonaparte’s troops to the Papal States and the annexation of Lazio to the First French Empire in 1807, Marino was declared a canton seat, incorporating Grottaferrata’s territory. This lasted until Pope Pius VII’s return to Rome in 1814. To reorganize the Papal States’ territorial divisions and public administration, Pius VII issued the motu proprio Quando per ammirabile disposizione in 1816, which discouraged feudal lords from retaining feudal rights to such an extent that most, including Filippo III Colonna, relinquished them. This ended Colonna rule in Marino, though the family retained ownership of their Marinese properties, gradually selling them over a century. In 1916, Isabella and Vittoria Colonna granted the last family properties in Marino, the palace and the Barco Colonna, to the Municipality of Marino in perpetual emphyteusis.

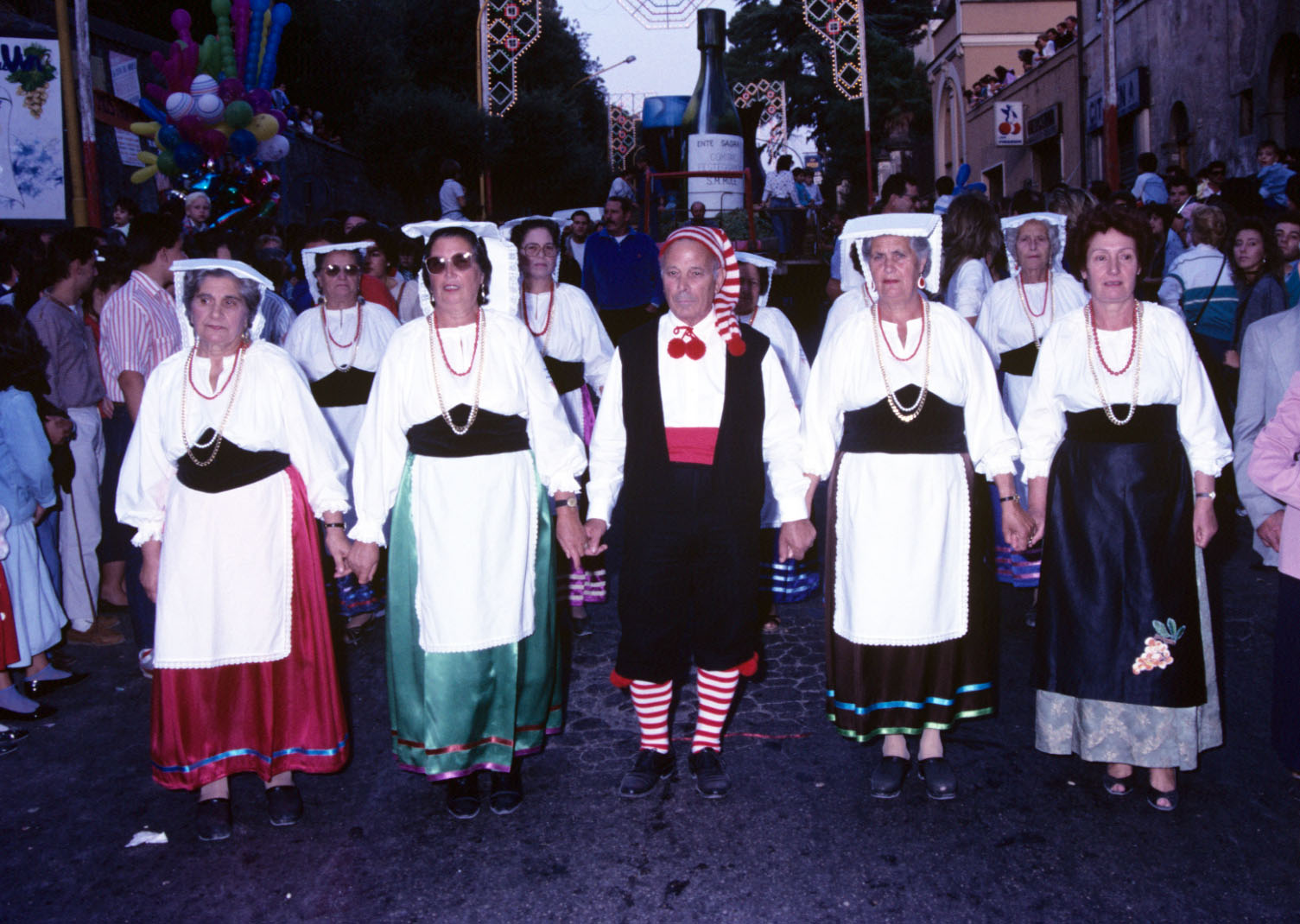
Traditional Marino costumes

Pope Gregory XVI (1831–1846) was closely tied to Marino, which benefited significantly with the restoration of the local government in 1831, elevation to city status in 1835, the opening of the college of the Doctrinaries, and the construction of the so-called "Gregorian Bridge," the access to the city from Castel Gandolfo along the State Road 216 Via Maremmana III. After the Capture of Porta Pia (20 September 1870) and Lazio's annexation to the Kingdom of Italy, Marino quickly distinguished itself with a municipal council dominated by republicans and anticlericals. A new municipal residence, now called Palazzo Matteotti, was built, and in 1880, work began on a railway link with the then-hamlet of Ciampino, already connected to Rome since 1856 via the Rome–Frascati railway. The Rome–Albano railway was completed in 1889.

=== From the 20th century to the 21st century ===
==== From the start of the century to the rise of Fascism ====
In the late 19th century, the Roman Castles saw the beginning of peasants’ struggles against semi-feudal exploitation by landowners, less intense than in Northern Italy but stronger than the passive acceptance in Southern Italy. The first land occupation in Marino occurred in 1898, and in 1902, a Marinese peasant resistance league was formed. By 1910, protests had spread from the peasants to the peperino quarries, a unique feature of Marino's territory. Further land occupations in 1917 targeted properties of the Colonna and Grazioli families, leased to the People's Party mayor Luigi Capri Cruciani, sparking a prolonged legal dispute. The Red Biennium began in Marino with strong animosity between peasants and large landowners: World War I veterans invaded the Casa Bianca, Sant’Antonio, and Castelluccia localities, while the "Colli Parioli" cooperative began building a "garden city" in Ciampino for 221 veteran families. Increasingly turbulent political tensions led to public order incidents and deaths.

Fascism struggled to establish itself in the Roman Castles, often relying on figures recycled from socialist, popular, or republican parties. The first squadristi appeared in the Castles on 27 April 1921 with a propaganda tour that visited Frascati, Marino, and Albano Laziale, initially facing strong hostility. After the March on Rome (28 October 1922), fascists gained confidence, progressively attacking municipalities, agricultural universities, and individual antifascists to control local administrations. In Marino, violence was unnecessary, as the republican majority joined the fascist banner in 1923, as occurred in Ariccia, with the popolari in Monte Porzio Catone and Castel Gandolfo, and nationalists in Rocca Priora. Fascism in Marino featured less violent figures than elsewhere, often from other political backgrounds, such as Luigi Capri Cruciani, who became a deputy and senator, or Ugo Colizza, a former anarchist and republican, listed as a subversive until 1929 before becoming podestà. The regime's credibility waned, entering a crisis by 1939–1940, with police informants reporting widespread anti-fascist sentiment, low participation in local fascist initiatives, and disaffection toward the regime.

From 1904, the "Castromenie festivals" (dedicated to the Roman municipium of Castrimoenium) began, but in 1925, Marinese poet Leone Ciprelli created the Wine Festival, Italy's first such event, notable for the "miracle" of fountains dispensing wine. In 1909, the parish priest of the Basilica of Saint Barnabas, Guglielmo Grassi, founded the San Barnaba Cooperative Credit Bank. Until his death in 1954, Monsignor Grassi also promoted the San Barnaba Parish Oratory and thriving theatrical activities.

==== World War II ====
During World War II, Marino's territory was first hit by Anglo-American air raids on 19 July 1943, targeting the Ciampino hamlet, a key military objective due to its railway junction and Rome–Ciampino Airport. On 8 September, hours before Marshal Pietro Badoglio announced the Armistice of Cassibile, Anglo-American planes bombing Frascati struck the Squarciarelli locality in Grottaferrata, cutting a branch of the aqueduct supplying the center of Marino and inter-Castles tram communications. After the Anglo-American landing on the Lazio coast at Anzio on the night of 22–23 January 1944, war incidents intensified in the Roman Castles. On Wednesday, 2 February 1944, around 12:30, several North American B-25 Mitchell bombers from the Fifteenth Air Force, each carrying 1360 kilograms of bombs, struck the center of Marino.

Wednesday, 2 February. All is calm, serene. People head home for lunch. In the church, the solemn Candlemas service has just ended. Some women linger in shops for daily errands.

12:30: the roar of engines. Alarm. Few head to shelters; most watch, as usual: so many formations have passed, especially recently! Where will these sow death?... One formation passes. A second approaches; it will pass like the others. A sudden explosion shatters all illusions. (It was the collapse of Palazzo Colonna, hit by a chain of large bombs.) People rush to shelters. Too late! A rain of bombs arrives, heralded by piercing whistles. Then another, and another. The town is buried in smoke and rubble dust: visibility is less than a meter. Screams. Moans. Cries. Ruins.

I refrain from describing. Those who lived those moments know; those who didn’t... cannot understand.

— Zaccaria Negroni, Marino Under the Bombs, pp. 15-16.

Bombings continued in the following days. As the front line neared Marino, the Prefect of Rome issued an evacuation order to the prefectural commissioner, who deferred the decision to Zaccaria Negroni, then head of the local National Liberation Committee. To avoid deportation to refugee camps and looting of abandoned homes (as occurred in nearby Lanuvio), Negroni refused to enforce the evacuation order. The city was occupied by Anglo-Americans on the night of 3–4 June 1944, defended only by small groups of German soldiers.

==== From the post-war period to the new millennium ====
To the mayor pro tempore Zaccaria Negroni, appointed by the Anglo-Americans, a bleak scenario presented itself: 10% of the territory's buildings had collapsed, the aqueduct was severely damaged, the Ciampino hamlet was nearly razed, the municipal residence of Palazzo Colonna was almost entirely destroyed along with the iconic Fountain of the Four Moors, the Basilica of Saint Barnabas was ruined, and railway and tram connections were severed. Reconstruction efforts began immediately, though the reconstruction plan was approved between 1953 and 1954, with significant interventions: the classification of Viale della Repubblica in Santa Maria delle Mole as a municipal road, paving the way for the hamlet's urban development, the installation of public lighting in Ciampino, the establishment of the Vascarelle district, and the enhancement of the aqueduct.

=== Symbols ===
The coat of arms of Marino.

The description of the municipal coat of arms, granted by Presidential Decree on 2 October 2006 along with the gonfalon, is as follows:

Of azure, a knight riding a prancing silver horse with black hooves, its forelegs raised, the knight dressed in a short red tunic, with face, neck, chest, arms, legs, and feet in flesh tone, golden-haired, holding in his left hand a black staff with a golden tip, bearing a bifurcated silver pennant, the horse’s hind legs crossing a hilly terrain of three green reliefs, emerging from the flanks and based at the point. External ornaments of a City.

The description of the gonfalon is:

A white cloth with an azure border, richly adorned with golden embroidery, charged with the above-described coat of arms with a centered golden inscription bearing the City’s name. Metal parts and cords will be gilded. The vertical pole will be covered in velvet in the cloth’s alternating colors, with golden studs arranged spirally. The arrow will feature the City’s coat of arms, and the stem will bear the engraved name. Tricolor ribbons in national colors with golden fringes.

The city colors are blue and white, also adopted by the municipality of Ciampino, which was part of Marino until December 1974. Occasionally, light blue is used instead of blue.

The city motto is SPQM, Senatus Populusque Marinensis, coined in 1835 after elevation to city status, modeled after the famous SPQR.

=== Honors ===
- Title of city; conferred by motu proprio in 1835 by Pope Gregory XVI.

=== Commemorations ===
- 2 February: Anniversary of the first Allied bombing of Marino.
- 7 October: Feast of Our Lady of the Rosary, celebrated throughout the Papal States since 1571 in gratitude for the Christian victory at the Battle of Lepanto. In Marino, the religious feast is typically moved to the first Sunday of October, coinciding with the Wine Festival.

== Monuments and places of interest ==
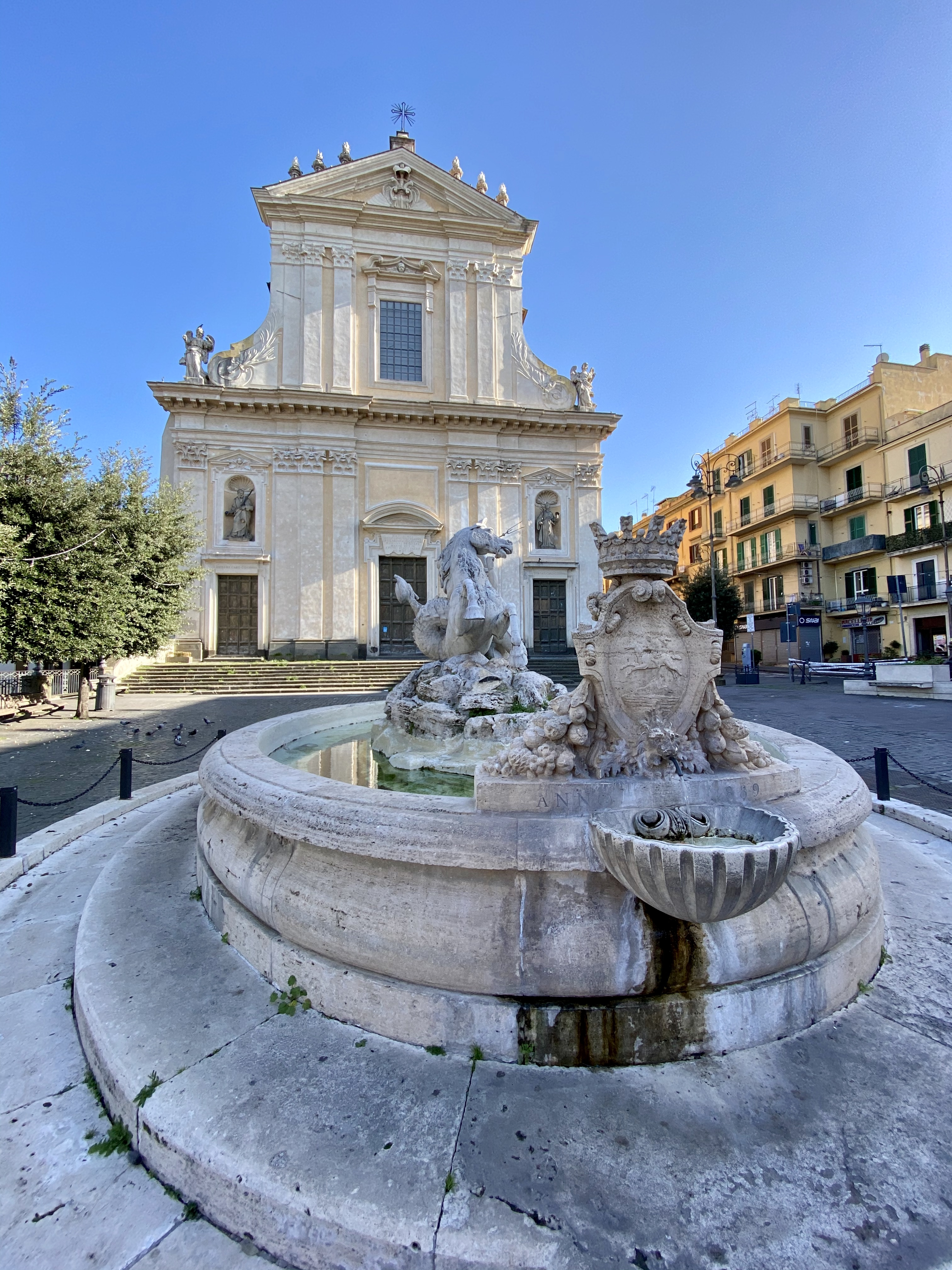
The Basilica of Saint Barnabas and the adjacent Triton Fountain (June 2020).

=== Religious architecture ===
- Collegiate Basilica of Saint Barnabas the Apostle
- Oratory of the Gonfalon
- Church of the Most Holy Trinity
- Church of Santa Maria delle Grazie
- Church and Convent of the Most Holy Rosary
- Sanctuary of Santa Maria dell'Acquasanta
- Former Church of Santa Lucia
- Church of Saint Anthony of Padua
- Former Church of San Giovanni
- Church of the Nativity of the Virgin Mary (Santa Maria delle Mole)
- Church of Saint Joseph (Frattocchie)
- Church and Convent of the Trappist Fathers (Frattocchie)
- Church of Saint Rita of Cascia (Cava dei Selci)
- Church of Santa Maria Ausiliatrice (Fontana Sala)

=== Civil architecture ===
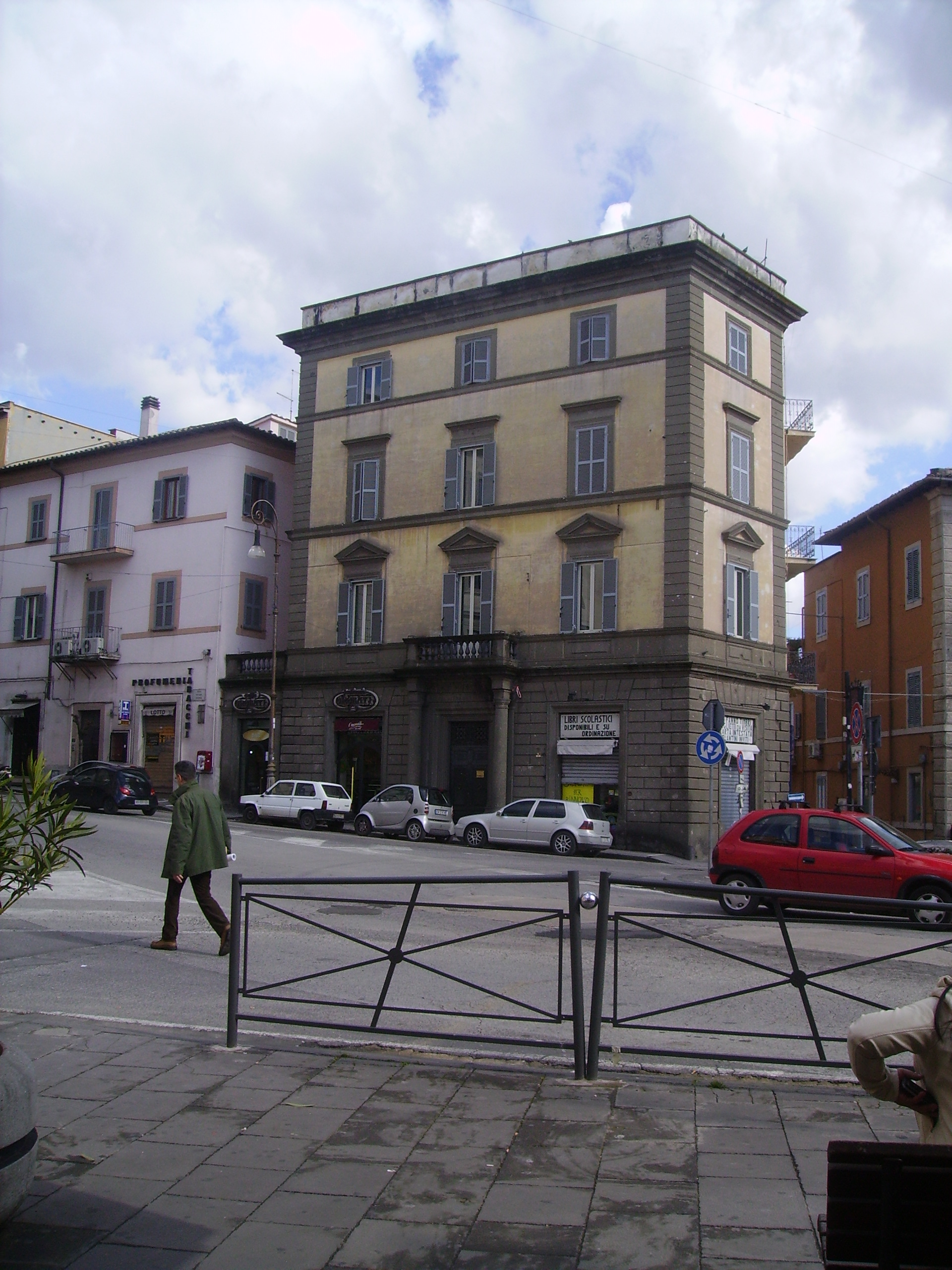
Palazzo Capri.

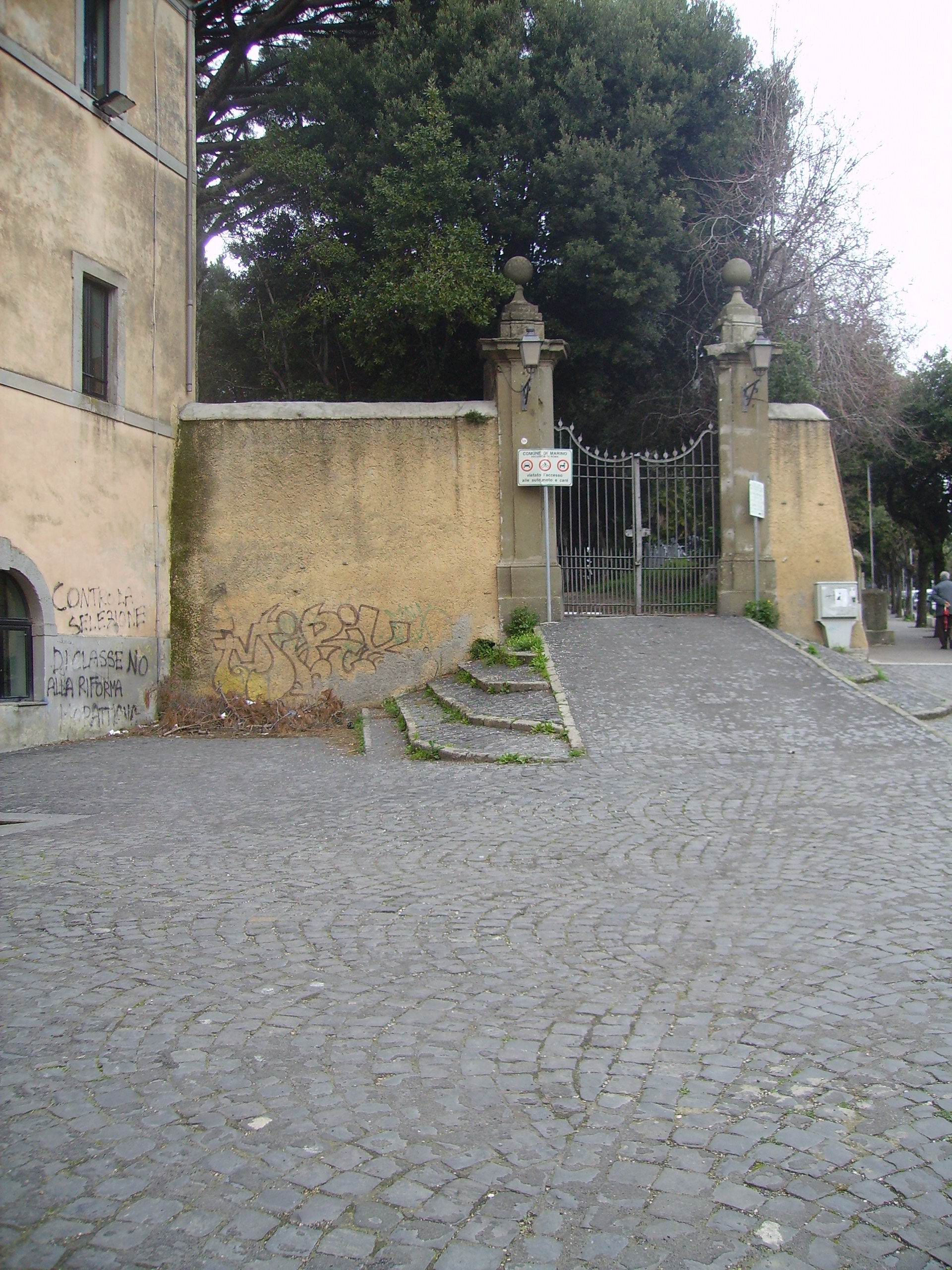
Portal of Villa Colonna-Desideri di Belpoggio.

- Palazzo Colonna
- Palazzo Matteotti (formerly Palazzo Comunale)
- Villa Desideri (formerly Colonna di Belpoggio)
- Colonna Gardens
- Palazzo Bandinelli; located in Borgo Garibaldi, outside the ancient city walls. Commissioned by Bartolomeo Bandinelli in the 15th century, it later passed to the Confraternity of Saint John the Beheaded, of which Bandinelli was a member.
- Palazzo Castagna; built by Cardinal Giovan Battista Castagna, a friend of Marcantonio Colonna, later Pope Urban VII, around 1580, it is also called "u'palazzu pentu" by locals for its now-faded painted friezes that once adorned its facade on Corso Trieste.
- Palazzo Capri
- Barco Colonna
- Villa Colizza (formerly Colonna di Bevilacqua)
- Villa della Sirena
- Villa Gabrielli, also known as Villa Sara or Villa Capri; situated along the current State Road 217 Via dei Laghi. Originally an agricultural estate, it was transformed into a villa in the mid-18th century by Angelo Gabrielli, Prince of Prossedi. Notable are its Rococo-style frescoes from around 1765, including family portraits, hunting scenes, and children's games, representing one of the most significant 18th-century interior decoration works in the Roman Castles. In the early 20th century, it passed from the Gabrielli to the Capri family. After the war, Carlo Ponti purchased and restored it, who resided there with Sophia Loren and expanded the 19th-century park. During this period, the villa hosted numerous celebrities.

=== Military architecture ===
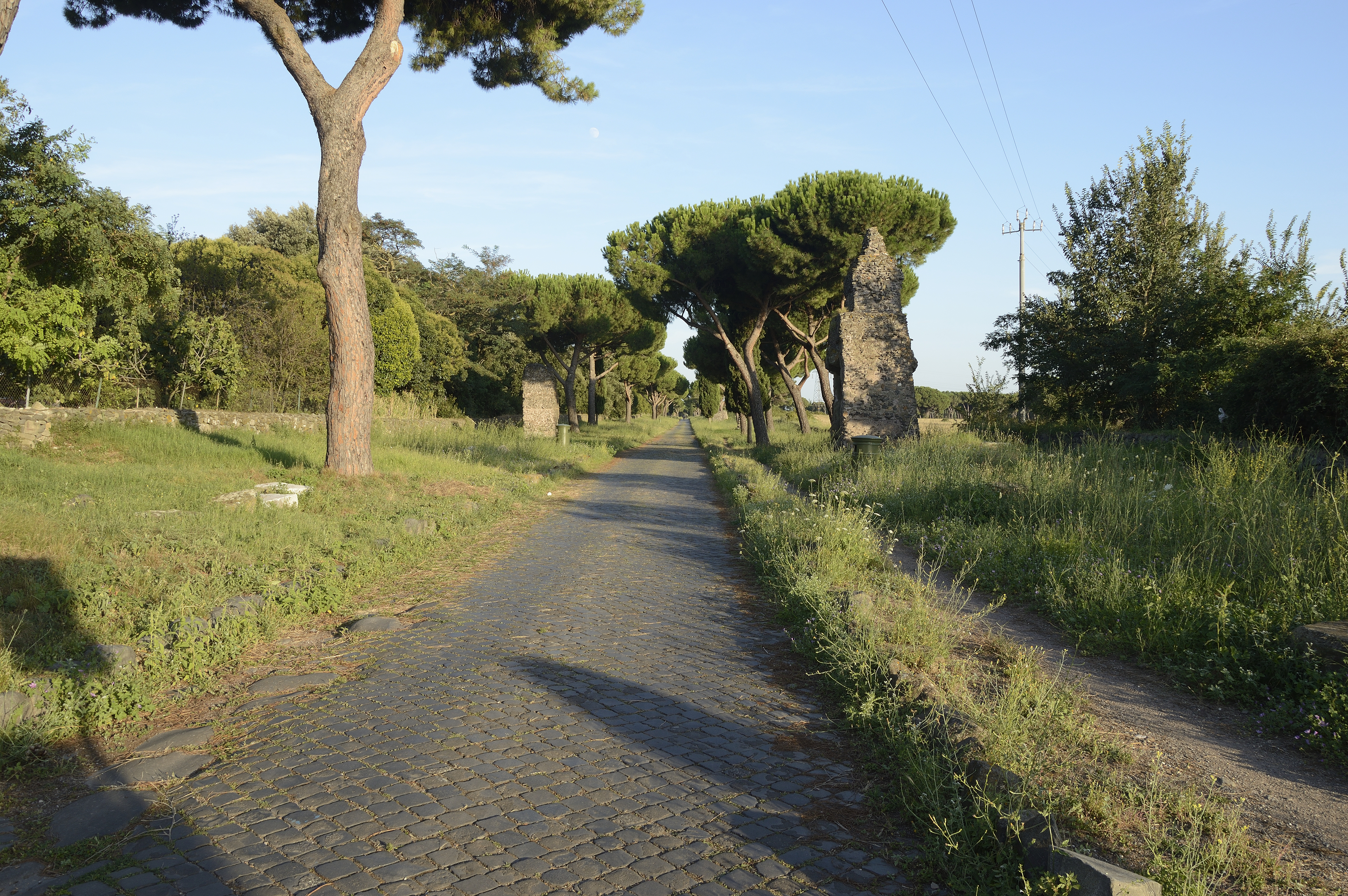
The Via Appia Antica near Santa Maria delle Mole: on the left, Tor Leonardo.

Since the 11th century, small fortifications and towers have been documented in Marino's countryside, positioned along major roads or near strategic points for territorial control. In 1388, Tor Leonardo is first mentioned, located along the Via Appia on an ancient Roman tomb near the current Santa Maria delle Mole. It belonged to the chapter of the St. Peter's Basilica, then to the Abbey of Santa Maria di Grottaferrata, and later to the Colonna.

The Palaverta Castle, located on the street of the same name near the hamlet of Castelluccia, served as a guard post on the Nettunense road. It was established in the 12th century but acquired its current name in 1509 when it was leased by the Colonna family to Paolo Averta. Nearby, the Pecoreccia Lanza tower, the Castellazza tower, and the remains of the "castrum Castelluccie," mentioned as early as the mid-10th century, can be found. The latter, having become property of the Orsini family, was razed to the ground by Cola di Rienzo in 1347.

Along the Pedemontana dei Castelli road, which connects the Via Tuscolana to the Via Appia while intersecting the Via Anagnina, several structures emerged: Tor Messer Paoli, likely the site of a medieval massa from the 8th century before becoming property of the Orsini, Basilian Crypt monks, and Colonna families; a tower at Sassone, mentioned in 1212; and a tower at Marana (or Acqua Sotterra) near the Marana delle Pietrare in Pantanelle, already existing in 1216.

== Other ==
=== Fountains ===
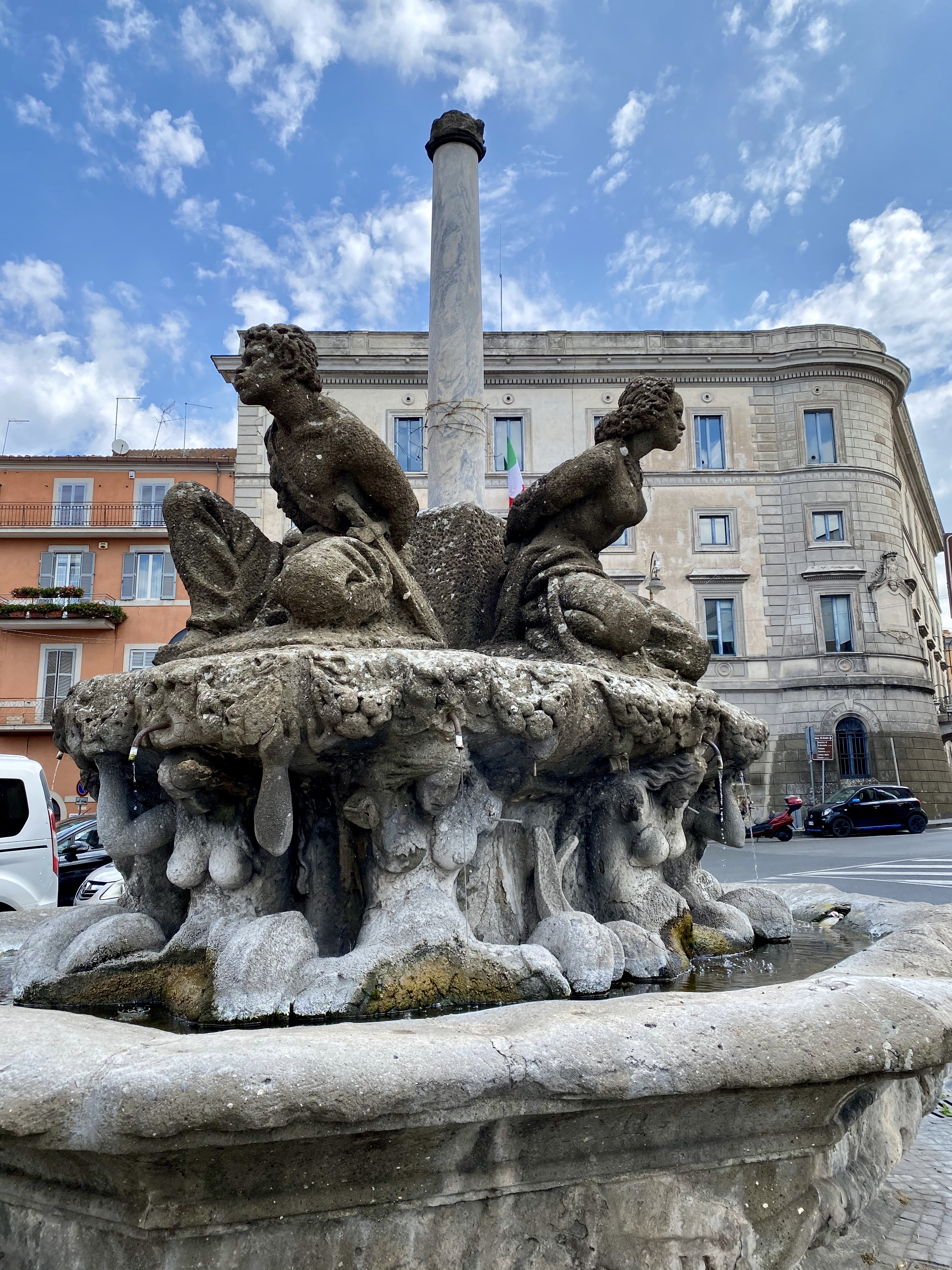
The Fountain of the Four Moors in Piazza Giacomo Matteotti.

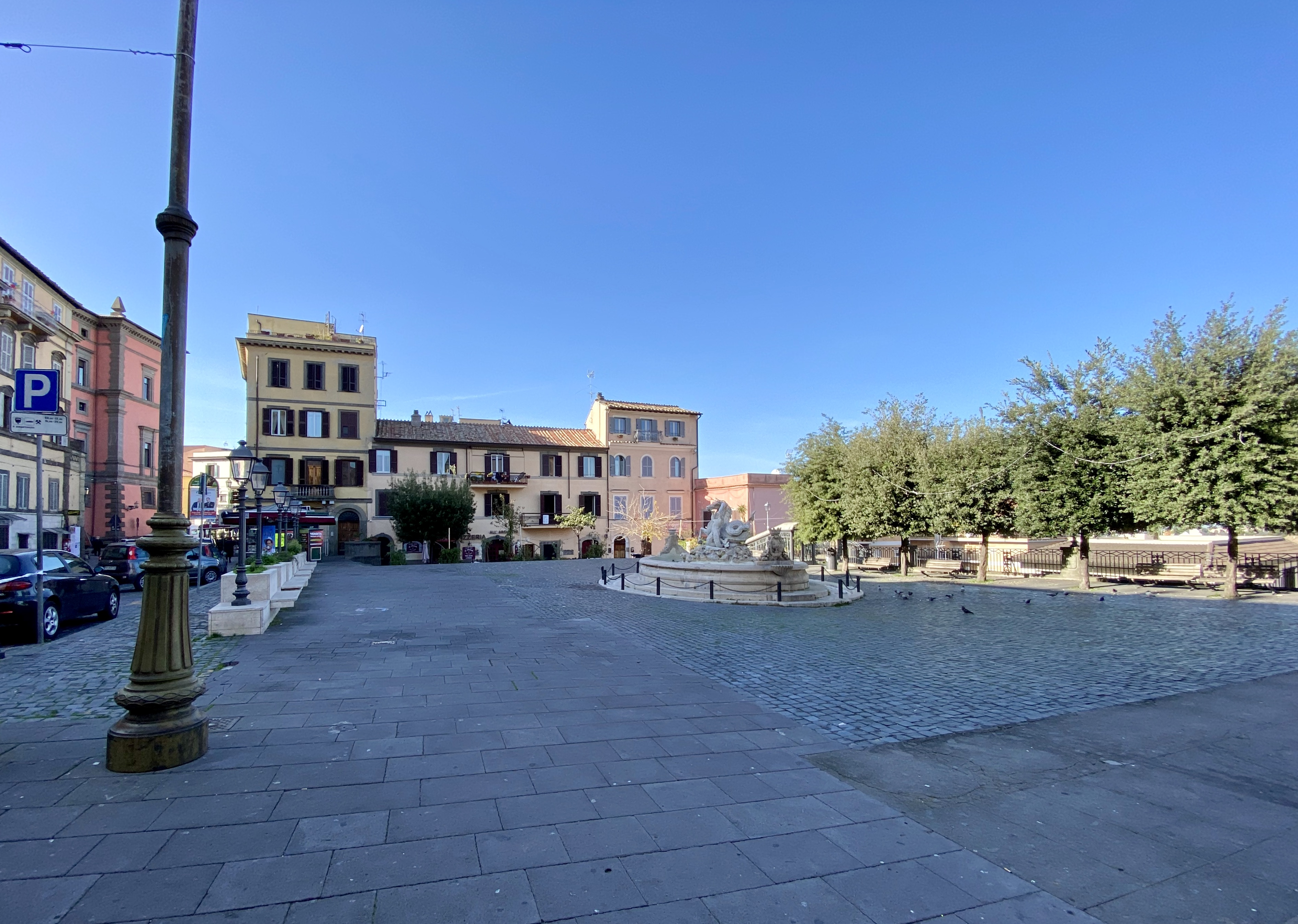
Piazza San Barnaba, with the Triton Fountain.

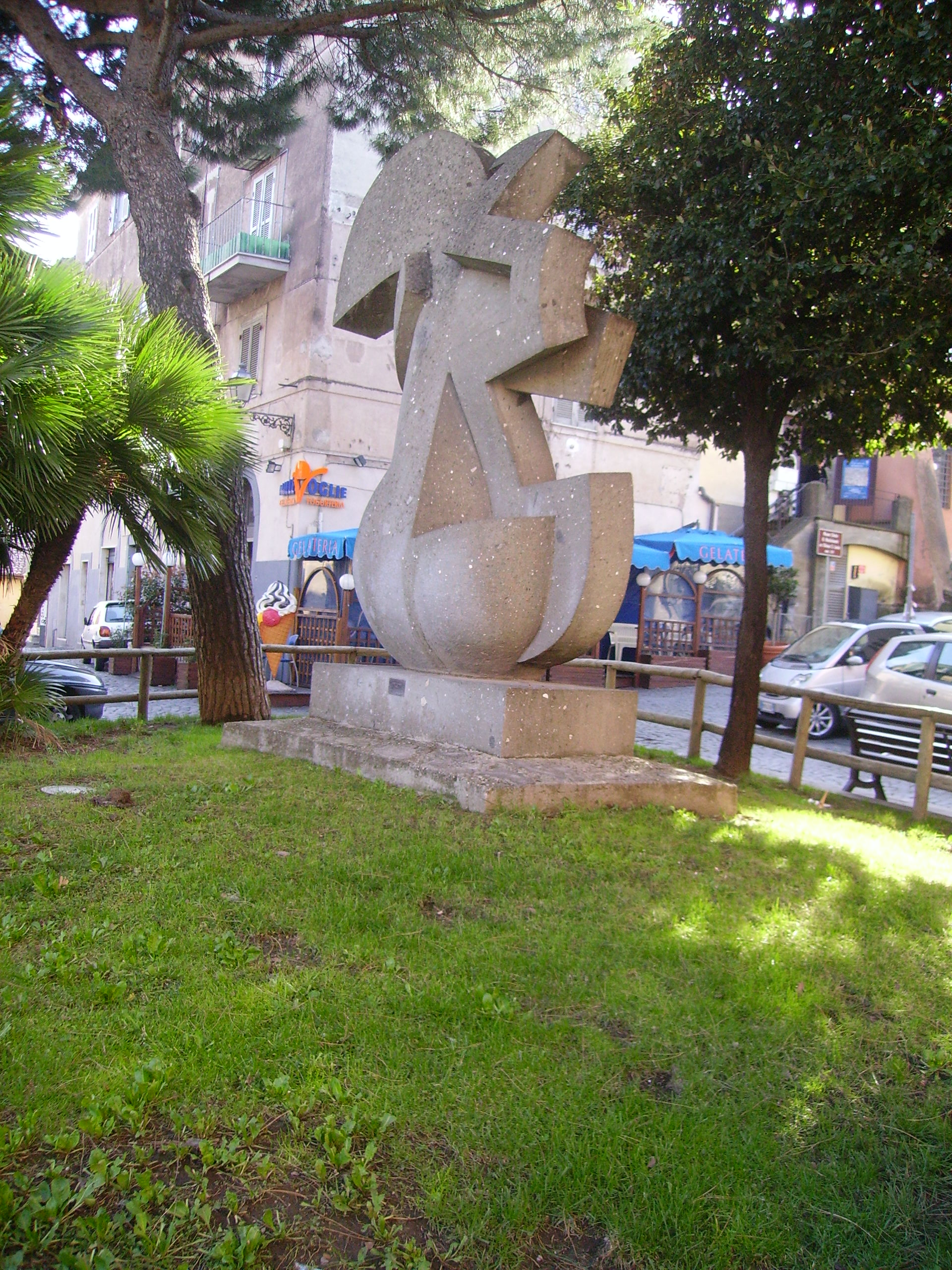
The Monument to the Brotherhood of Peoples in Piazza Giacomo Matteotti, a work by Paolo Marazzi (1977).

- Fountain of the Four Moors: This fountain, a symbol of the city, was built in 1632 on the commission of the Community to celebrate the victory of Marcantonio II Colonna in the Battle of Lepanto in 1571. The design, created by architect Sergio Venturi, was significantly altered at the request of Duke Filippo I Colonna and according to the style of sculptor Pompeo Castiglia. The result was a column of white marble with four chained Moors, supported by eight mermaids in a peperino basin. Originally placed in what is now Piazza Lepanto, the fountain was severely damaged by the collapse of Palazzo Colonna following the Anglo-American air raid on 2 February 1944. It was rebuilt in 1969 by a group of Marino sculptors in its current location at Piazza Giacomo Matteotti. The fountain's fame is closely tied to the "miracle of the fountains dispensing wine" during the Wine Festival, as it was the first fountain to dispense wine on 4 October 1925.
- Ammontes Fountain: A washhouse located outside the town in the Acquasanta district, near the tower of the same name, used until the 1930s as a public washhouse due to the abundance of spring water and the proximity of the Marana delle Pietrare.
- Neptune Fountain: Located in Piazza San Barnaba, this fountain was commissioned by the Municipality to the Sicilian sculptor Michele Tripisciano in 1889. At the center of the elliptical basin, equipped with two side drinking spouts, is a sculptural group in white marble depicting Neptune and Triton, which gives the fountain its name.
- Municipal Fountain: Built by the Municipality in 1896 in the Borgo Garibaldi district as a public drinking trough just outside the town, along the busy road to Rome, the Provincial Road 73/a Via Castrimeniense.
- Gaudenzio Fountain: A public drinking trough located under the "Bramante walls" on the western side of Palazzo Colonna, thus named for unknown reasons and demolished in the 1950s to make way for parking spaces. A small fountain in the same style was rebuilt on the site in 2012.

Other more recent fountains include the fountain on Via Giuseppe Garibaldi, integrated into the staircase complex leading from the street to the overlying Piazza San Barnaba, built in the 1960s; the fountain in Piazza Giuseppe Garibaldi, located in the center of the public garden of the same square, constructed for the 1990 FIFA World Cup, when Marino hosted the official retreat of the Italy national football team; and the fountain on Corso Vittoria Colonna at the entrance to the public park of Villa Desideri, built for the same occasion. A fountain in Bernini style was placed in the center of Piazza Giacomo Matteotti after the municipal seat was moved to the current Palazzo Matteotti in 1884, but it was dismantled in 1903 to make way for the tracks of the Tramways of the Roman Castles.

=== Monuments ===
- Monument to the Fallen: The first Monument to the Fallen in Marino was created by sculptor Ettore Ferrari after World War I and placed in what is now Largo Giacoma de Settesoli. It depicted a bronze hero wearing only a Greek helmet, with his right hand raised and holding the torch of life in his left. This monument was destroyed during the Anglo-American bombings of 1944, and a new monument was designed only in 1969 and placed in Piazzale degli Eroi. It consisted of a peperino altar surrounded by long steel slabs raised upward. With the start of construction for a multi-story parking garage in the square in the late 1980s, the monument was demolished, and a new one was rebuilt on the same site in 1998 by sculptor Alberto Piras.
- The Warrior: A large-scale bronze work by sculptor Umberto Mastroianni, who resided at the Casino Colonna until his death in 1998. Donated by the artist to the Municipality, it was placed in the early 1990s in Largo Guglielmo Oberdan, at the foot of Palazzo Colonna.
- Monument to the Man of Boville: A large-scale peperino work by Marino sculptor Paolo Marazzi, located at the intersection of the State Road 7 Via Appia Nuova and the State Road 207 Via Nettunense, in Frattocchie.

Other monumental peperino artworks are remnants of various editions of the "Alban Stone Biennale," an event that began in 1978 and ended in the early 1990s, featuring participation from sculptors worldwide. Notable among them are the "Monument to the Brotherhood of Peoples," a work by Marino sculptor Paolo Marazzi, created for the first Biennale in 1978 and placed in the current Largo Giacoma de Settesoli; "The Family," a work by Japanese sculptor Kazuto Kuetani, created for the second Biennale in 1980 and placed at the "Vittoria Colonna" municipal library in the public park of Villa Desideri; "Work Dedicated to Spanish Mythology," by Spanish sculptor Luis Ramos, created for the seventh Biennale in 1990 and placed in the public garden of Piazza Giuseppe Garibaldi; "Man with Angel" by French sculptress Sylvie Kleine, located on Via Giuseppe Garibaldi in front of the main headquarters of the San Barnaba Cooperative Credit Bank; and by Mario Gavotti, "Marine Forms" (1980), two sculptures, the first located in Parco San Rocco and the second at the youth hostel (2000). A bas-relief, "Suffering Christ," is located in the caves beneath the old municipal building, used as a shelter during bombings (2015).

Sculptures by other local and international artists are found along Via Cave di Peperino, including the work by Mattia Pagliarini, "Ancient Face," a peperino bas-relief located in the Cave di Peperino park (2024).

=== Archaeological sites ===
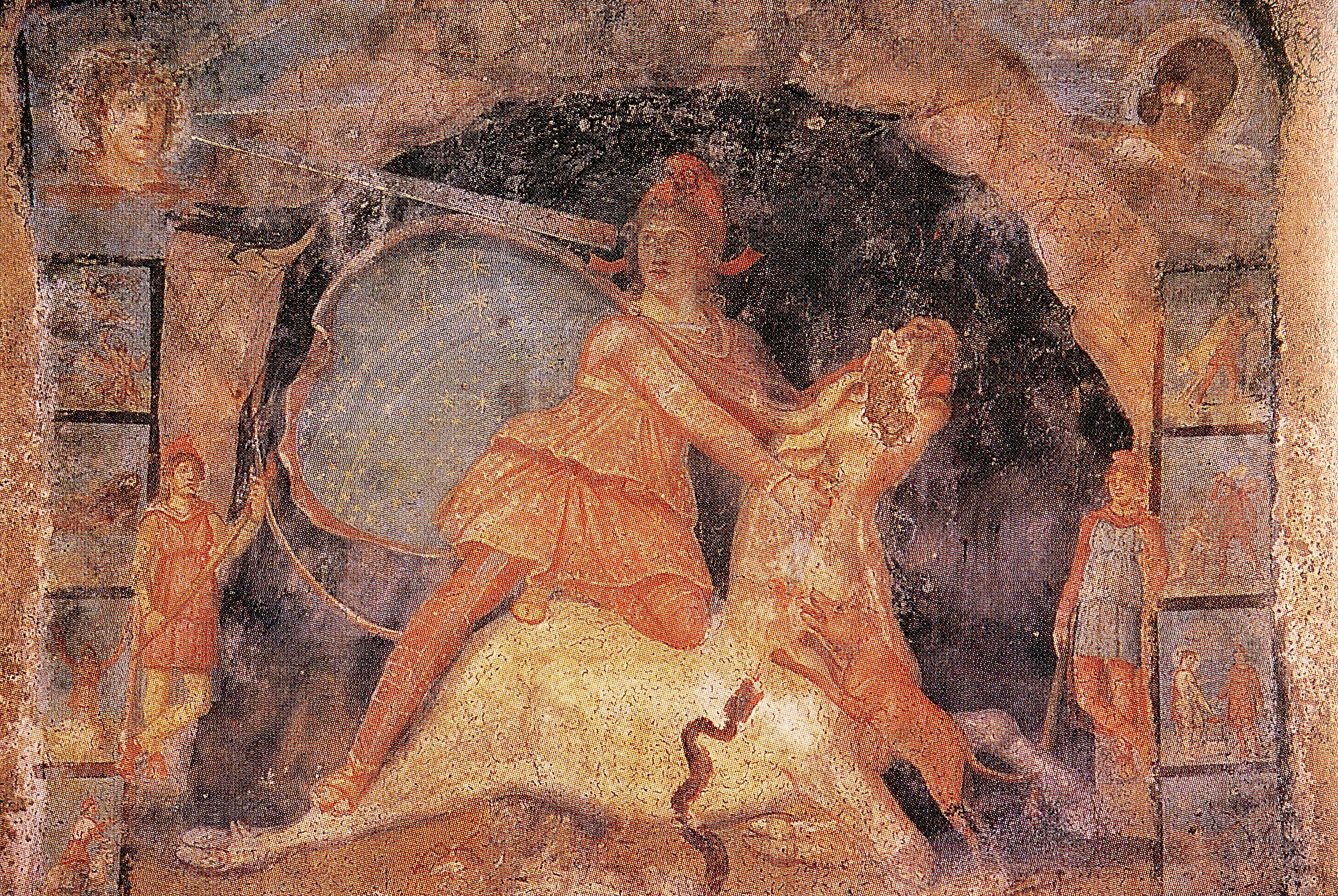
The Tauroctony of the Mithraeum of Marino.

The territory of Marino is, as Athanasius Kircher stated in his work on Lazio, "innumeris antiquitatum vestigiis refertissimus est" ("exceedingly rich in countless traces of antiquity"). The oldest archaeological evidence is a foundation of an Iron Age hut discovered in the Cave di Peperino district in the 1970s by Pino Chiarucci, the current director of the Civic Museum of Albano Laziale. Other pre-Roman finds had already been unearthed since the 19th century and throughout the 1910s during excavations of necropolises identified in the localities of Riserva Del Truglio, Pascolari di Castel Gandolfo, Campofattore, and other sites along the Lake Albano.

The identification of the ancient Latin city of Mugillae near Santa Maria delle Mole, though long debated, now appears credible. Legambiente, along with some citizens, is working to protect the probable site of the city (never explored by archaeologists) from rampant urban expansion. Regarding the site of Bovillae, archaeological excavations were conducted between 1823 and 1825, and again in 1910 and 1930, uncovering numerous significant artifacts, including the famous circus, and identifying the sites of the theater, the "scola actorum", the temple of Vejovis, and the shrine of the gens Julia.

In the center of Marino, the most notable discovery was made in 1962, with the unearthing of the Mithraeum of Marino, one of only three painted Mithraea in Italy and among the best-preserved and artistically significant in the world. Another important find was made under the former church of Santa Lucia in the late 1990s, with the discovery of a Roman cistern later adapted for Christian worship. In the spaces of the former church, the Umberto Mastroianni Civic Museum was established in 2000, housing some archaeological remains previously kept in the old municipal antiquarium, established in 1904 at Palazzo Colonna and dispersed due to the Anglo-American bombings of 1944.

Recently, two sections of road were uncovered in Frattocchie. The first appears to be a branch of the Via Nettunense, heading toward the Alban Hills for a short distance, while the second is a branch of the Via Appia, discovered during excavations for the construction of a McDonald's in the former STAFF area, heading toward Vicolo del Torraccio. Along this second branch, three tombs, each containing a skeleton, were identified. The area, within the McDonald's, has been made accessible and protected with glass covers. Finally, along the section of the Appia Antica near Via della Repubblica in Santa Maria delle Mole, a structure believed to be a small thermal bath was uncovered, and along Via delle Repubblica itself, during excavations for ENEL cable placement, sections of floor mosaics and other remains, currently under study, were found.

=== Natural areas ===
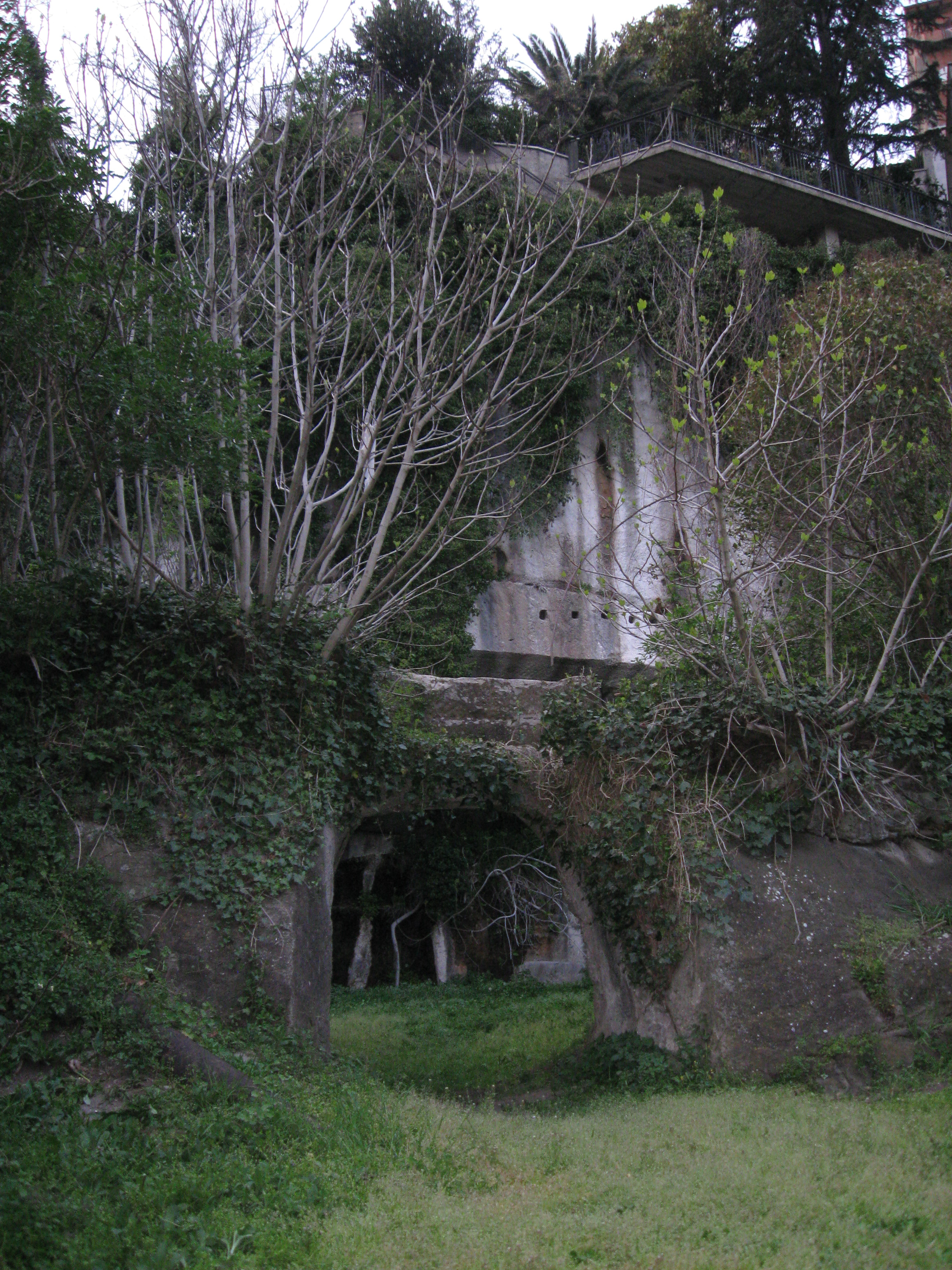
The entrance to a disused peperino quarry in the public park of the Acquasanta district.

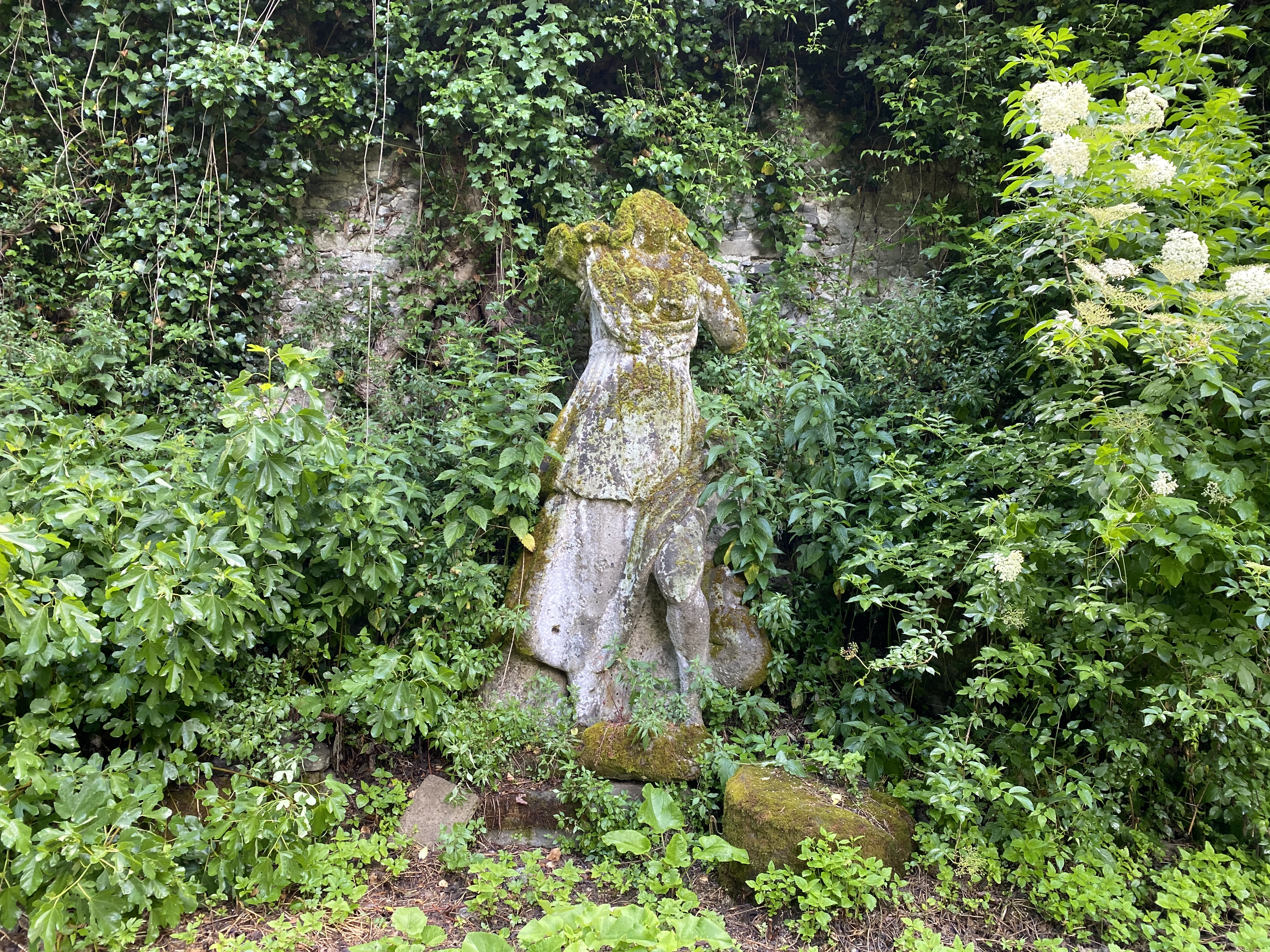
One of the Mannerist-era statues that decorated the "fountain square" of the Barco Colonna, popularly nicknamed "Cellone".

Public green areas in the municipality of Marino:

- Villa Desideri Public Park (Marino center)
- Barco Colonna (Marino center)
- Bosco Ferentano (Marino center)
- Public garden of Piazza Giuseppe Garibaldi (Marino center)
- Public park of the Acquasanta district (Marino center)
- Public park of the Cave di Peperino district (Marino center)
- Peace Park (Cava dei Selci)
- Sassone Park (Cava dei Selci)
- Giovanni Falcone Park (Santa Maria delle Mole)
- Spigarelli Park (Santa Maria delle Mole)

A relatively small portion of Marino's municipal territory (limited to the Bosco Ferentano, the Barco Colonna, and small adjacent areas) is included within the perimeter of the Regional Park of the Roman Castles, an environmental protection agency established in 1984 by the Lazio Region in the Alban Hills area. Initially, the entire municipal territory was included in the park's protected area (Regional Law No. 2 of 13 January 1984), but on 28 September 1984, the areas assigned to the park were drastically reduced due to obvious reasons related to the urban and industrial expansion of the included settlements. The current park boundaries are broader than the previous ones, encompassing much of the territory of the first municipal decentralization district (Marino center), while the contiguous area extends to the edges of the inhabited hamlets of Cava dei Selci and Due Santi.

A portion of the second municipal decentralization district (Santa Maria delle Mole-Cava dei Selci) is included within the Appian Way Regional Park, another regional environmental protection agency established in 1988 across the municipalities of Marino, Ciampino, and Rome, covering a total area of 3,500 hectares.

Among the sites of particular naturalistic interest, the Bosco Ferentano, spanning 22 hectares, is one of the few wooded areas in the Alban Hills where the mixed forest (the so-called Q.T.A. forest, consisting of oaks, lindens, and maples) has resisted the advance of the chestnut, introduced by humans between the 17th century and 18th century, which covers about 80% of the park's wooded surface.

Even outside the historic center, in the hamlets of Marino, numerous public green areas are maintained by citizen committees: the first was Sassone Park in Cava dei Selci, fenced in 1977; followed by Spigarelli Park (1980) and the park on Via Pietro Maroncelli in Santa Maria delle Mole, the latter named after Giovanni Falcone in 1993. The Peace Park in Cava dei Selci was created in the area occupied by the tracks of the Tramways of the Roman Castles (in operation on this route until 1965) in the 1990s, and it includes an amphitheater for 800 spectators. In 2009, it underwent further renovations.

== Society ==
Historical population
Year	Pop.	±%
1871	4,420	—
1881	4,755	+7.6%
1901	5,663	+19.1%
1911	5,882	+3.9%
1921	7,340	+24.8%
1931	8,898	+21.2%
1936	11,308	+27.1%
1951	13,109	+15.9%
1961	18,097	+38.1%
1971	23,836	+31.7%
1981	30,772	+29.1%
1991	32,903	+6.9%
2001	32,706	−0.6%
2011	38,245	+16.9%
2021	46,048	+20.4%

=== Ethnic groups and foreign minorities ===
As of 31 December 2010, the foreign residents in Marino numbered 3,235. They are distributed by nationality as follows (only data for groups exceeding 50 individuals are listed):

1. Romania: 1,514
2. Albania: 458
3. Ukraine: 511
4. Poland: 95
5. Moldova: 86
6. Tunisia: 53

=== Language and dialects ===
In addition to the Italian language, no other languages are officially recognized in Marino. The local dialect belongs to the family of the Central-Northern Latian dialect.

In the hamlets of Marino, the linguistic situation is more complex: the Marino dialect has been overlaid with other dialects of the Roman Castles and the speech patterns of numerous post-World War II immigrants from various parts of Italy, particularly Abruzzese dialects, Marchigiano dialects, Venetian language, Southern Latian dialect, and other Southern Italian dialects in general. However, there is a general trend toward the widespread expansion of the Romanesco dialect throughout the Rome metropolitan area, especially in its southern quadrant.

=== Religion ===
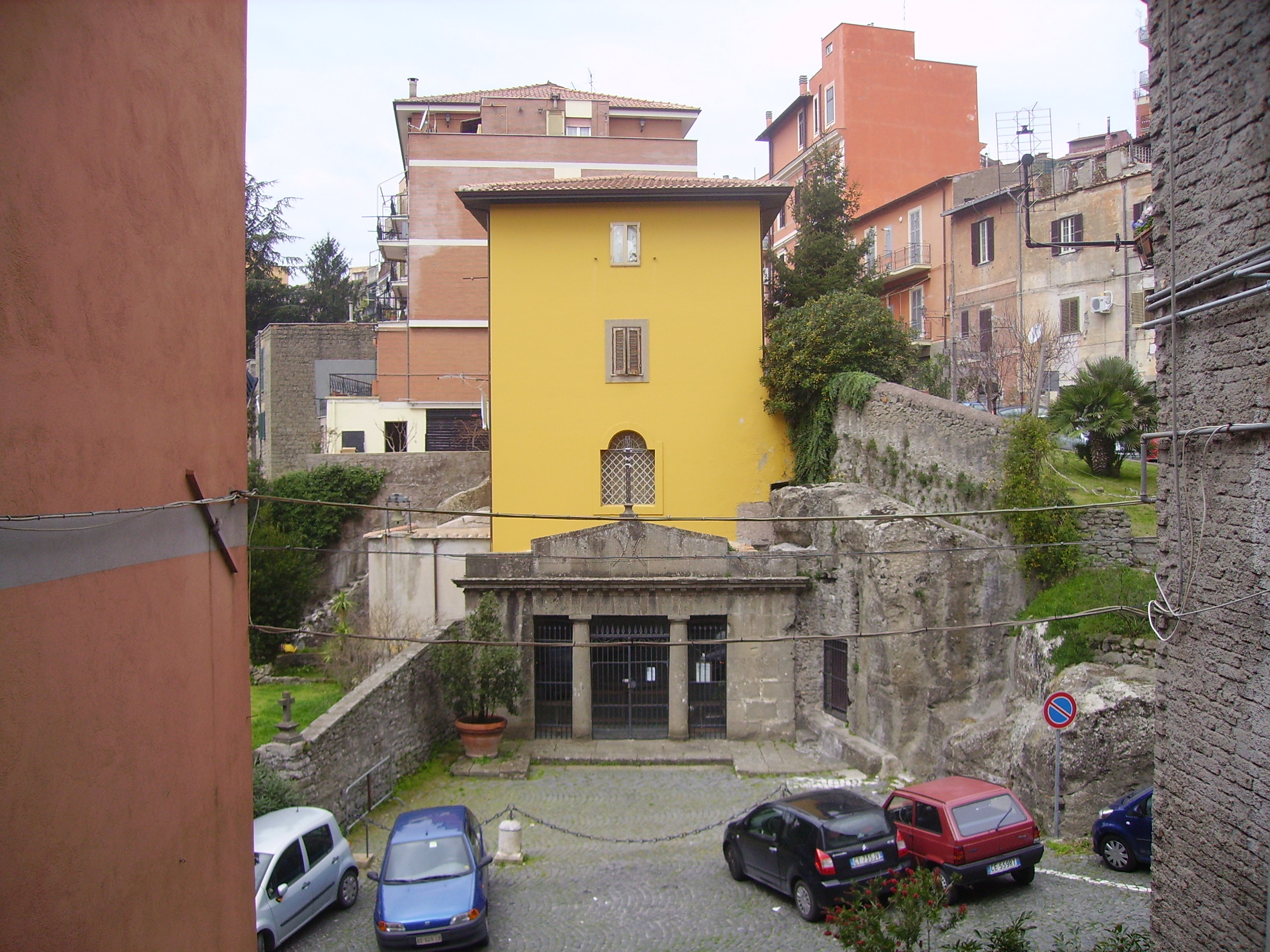
The Sanctuary of Santa Maria dell'Acquasanta in the eponymous quarter, where tradition holds that Saint Bonaventure stopped to pray around 1270–1274, conceiving the idea of founding the Confraternity of the Gonfalon of Marino, an institution so ancient that it claimed precedence over the Roman confraternity of the same name.

The predominant religion in Marino is Christianity in the Catholic denomination. The municipal territory includes eight parishes. The parish of the Basilica of San Barnaba also encompasses part of the territory of Rocca di Papa up to Palazzolo. Various religious communities are present in the area, including the Missionary Oblates of Mary Immaculate and the Holy Family of Bordeaux.

=== Traditions and folklore ===
During the Wine Festival in Marino, one of the oldest historical costume parades in Italy takes place: the first edition was held in 1929, and it was sporadically resumed in subsequent years until it became a regular event starting in 1969, initiated by the cultural group "Storia ed Arte". Since the 1990s, the parade has been organized by two cultural associations responsible for creating the costumes and recruiting participants: "Arti e Costumi Marinesi" (founded in 1995) and "Lo Storico Cantiere" (founded in 1991).

The historical parade commemorates the return of the feudal lord Marcantonio II Colonna to his homeland after his victory as admiral of the papal fleet in the Battle of Lepanto in 1571 against the Ottoman Empire. However, it does not depict his entry into Marino, which likely occurred privately on 4 November 1571, but rather his triumphal entry into Rome, granted by Pope Pius V on 4 December of the same year.

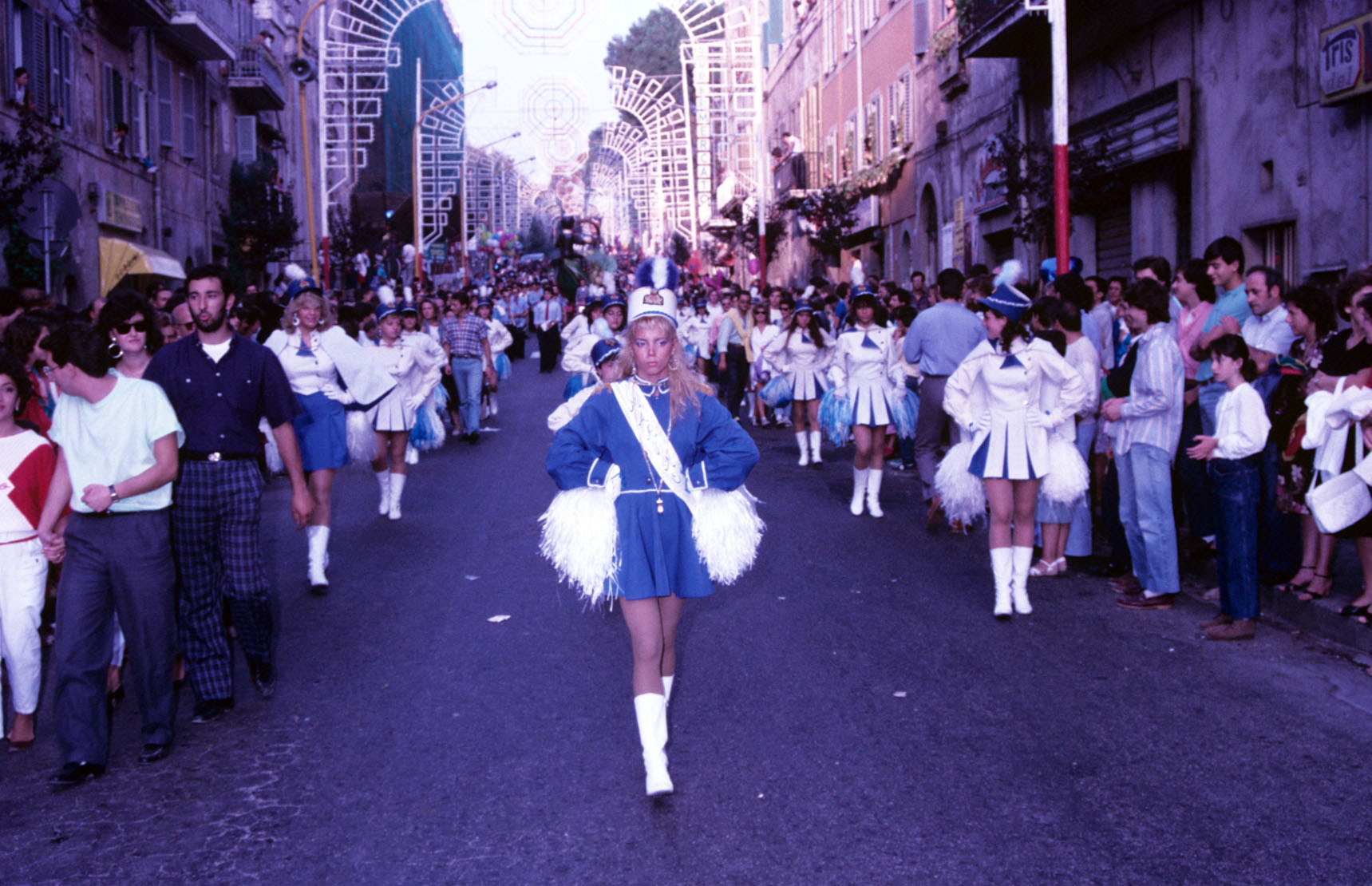
Majorettes of the Marino musical band

The Romanesco poet and playwright Leone Ciprelli, an anagram of Ercole Pellini (1873–1953), was a native of Marino. He initiated the Wine Festival in 1924 and promoted the Romanesco song and poetry competition held during the festival from 1926 until the outbreak of World War II. During those years, Marino was a major center for the dissemination of Romanesco dialect songs and poetry.

=== Quality of life ===
According to some statistics, the average per capita income of a Marino resident is 13,600 euros (2003 data), lower than the provincial average (16,976 euros) and the regional average (17,590 euros).

According to these statistics, in 2003, Marino residents spent an average of 8,900 euros per capita on purchases, compared to the regional average of 9,900 euros and the provincial average of 10,600 euros.

== Culture ==
=== Education ===
==== Libraries ====
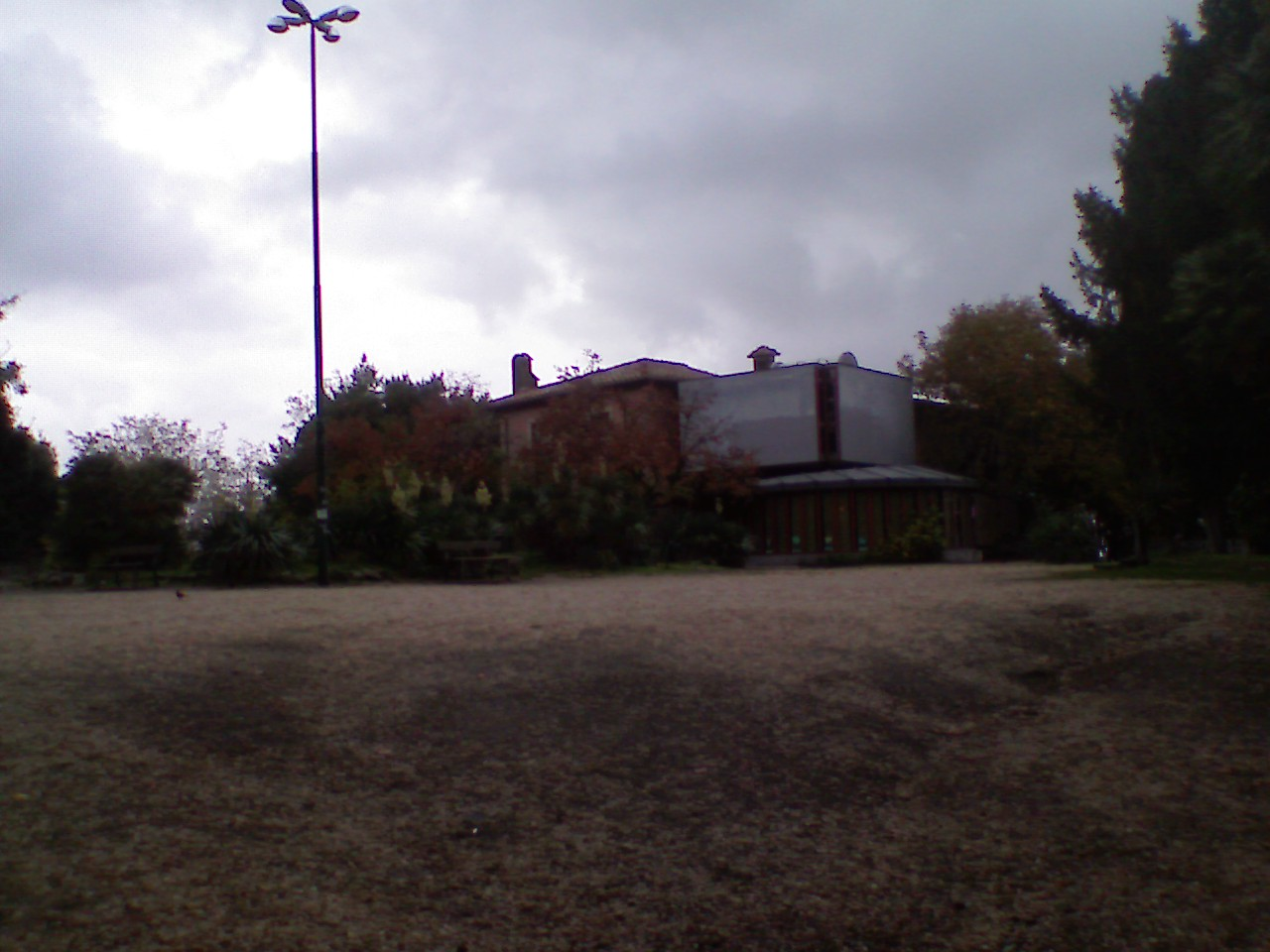
The "Vittoria Colonna" municipal library.

The main library in the area is the "Vittoria Colonna" municipal library, located in the building of the Villa Desideri public park. This institution was founded in 1984 and currently holds approximately 24,000 volumes and over 1,700 documents dated between 1835 and 1957 from the municipal archive. The library was among the founding members of the Roman Castles Library System in 1997, ranking third among Roman Castles libraries for its book collection.

Since April 2004, the "Vittoria Colonna" municipal library, in collaboration with the Roman Castles Library System, has maintained a reading and lending point for children in the hamlet of Santa Maria delle Mole.

On the ground floor of Palazzo Colonna, at the headquarters of the pro loco association, the "Girolamo Torquati" local interest library has been located for several years, specializing in collecting materials related to local history and traditions.

Since July 2017, the Bibliopop-"Giselda Rosati" popular library has been active, established using the "Lello Raffo Fund" donated to the Acab Association of Marino, located in Santa Maria delle Mole, via S. Pellico, 12. Bibliopop lacks sufficient space for reading and primarily promotes book lending through its website or directly, where users can consult the growing collection, currently comprising about 1,500 volumes from 1860 to the present.

==== Schools ====
For primary education and lower secondary education, Marino has five state institutes and three private Catholic schools, in addition to the Institute of the Religious Teachers Venerini.

==== Universities ====
In the hamlet of Due Santi, at kilometer 21.5 of the State Road 7 Via Appia Nuova, the Rome campus of the University of Dallas is located, inaugurated in June 1994 and used by the American Catholic university as a base for student trips in Europe.

==== Museums ====
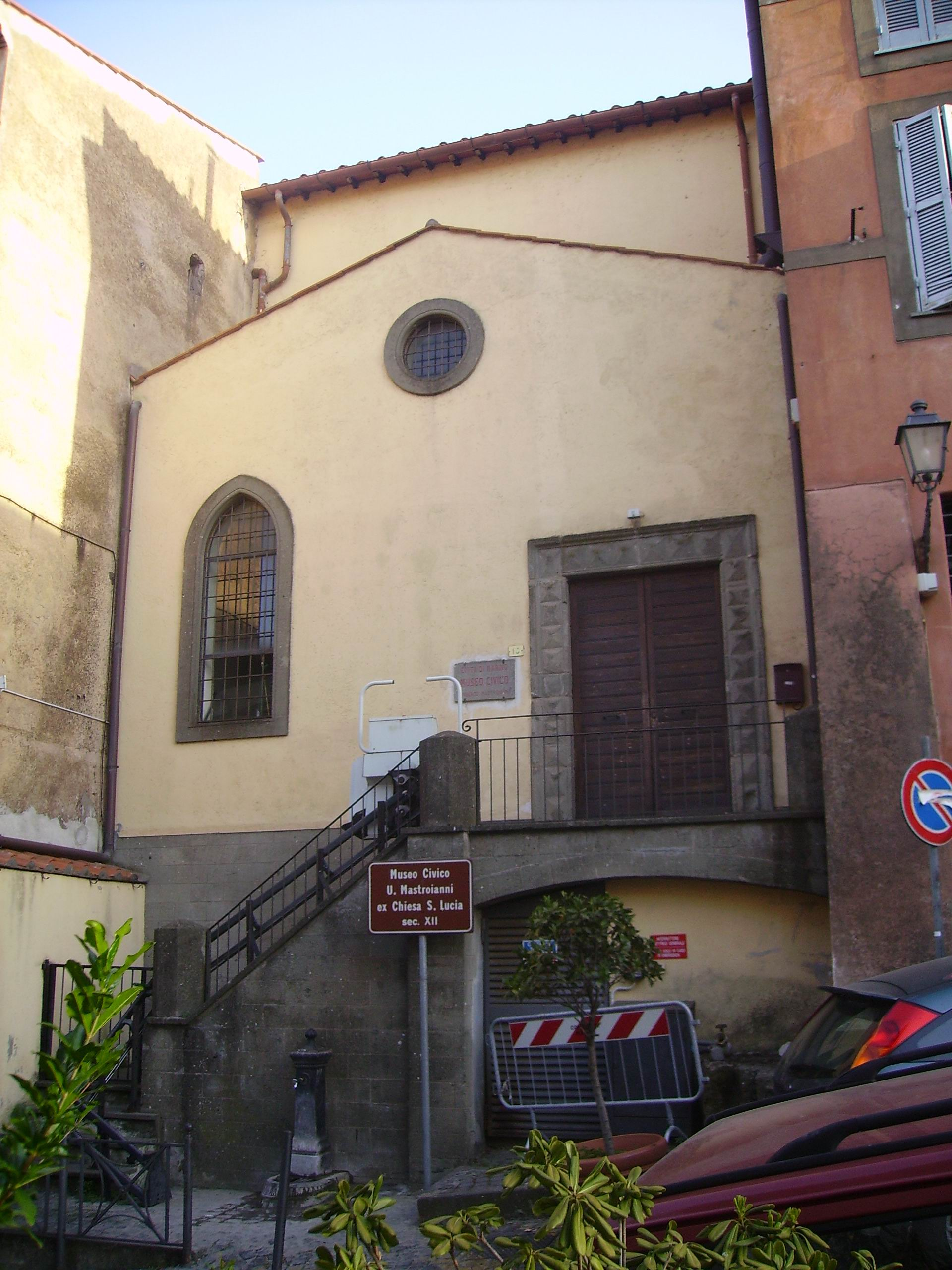
Entrance to the "Umberto Mastroianni" civic museum in the former Church of Santa Lucia.

- "Umberto Mastroianni" Civic Museum.

The Umberto Mastroianni Civic Museum is the city's main museum, located in the former Church of Santa Lucia. Following the significant discovery of archaeological artifacts during random excavations in the Marino territory at the end of the 19th century, the municipality decided in 1904 to establish a municipal antiquarium on the main floor of Palazzo Colonna. The antiquarium was destroyed during the Anglo-American bombing of the palace on 2 February 1944, and the few surviving artifacts, along with new finds, were stored in the warehouses of the Paolo Mercuri State Art Institute until the civic museum was established in 2000. Among the most notable works are a relief with the face of Medusa in white marble, which has become the museum's symbol, two coarse-grained white marble table supports, and some components of the ancient Gothic church, such as a fresco of a saint.

- Underground pathways.

The underground caves of Palazzo Colonna, likely the most extensive network of caves among the many dug beneath the historic center of Marino, were opened to the public in 1999. Access is through the pro loco association headquarters in Largo Palazzo Colonna. The exhibition path is divided into two sections:

- War Memories: This section commemorates the use of the caves as a refuge for many Marino residents displaced by Anglo-American air raids between February and June 1944. Remnants of their presence, such as shoes, blankets, and other everyday items, remain, along with explanatory panels featuring period materials.
- In Vita Vitis: A path recalling the original function of the spaces, displaying agricultural tools and other materials related to wine production.

In these evocative spaces, a nativity scene exhibition called "Cribs in the Cave" is held during the Christmas season.

- Coopers' Museum.

This small museum space was set up in the early 2000s in a cellar on Via Costa Caselle, featuring characteristic peperino lintels shaped to allow the passage of barrels. Inside, traditional tools of viticulture and winemaking are displayed, along with other memories of the peasant world. Cultural events are held here, especially in October, coinciding with the Wine Festival.

- Wine Cart Museum.

Set up in a small venue (tavern) where wine was once served, it testifies to the town's ancient customs.

- Wine Museum.

An exhibition displaying tools and instruments used for wine production.

=== Media ===
==== Press ====
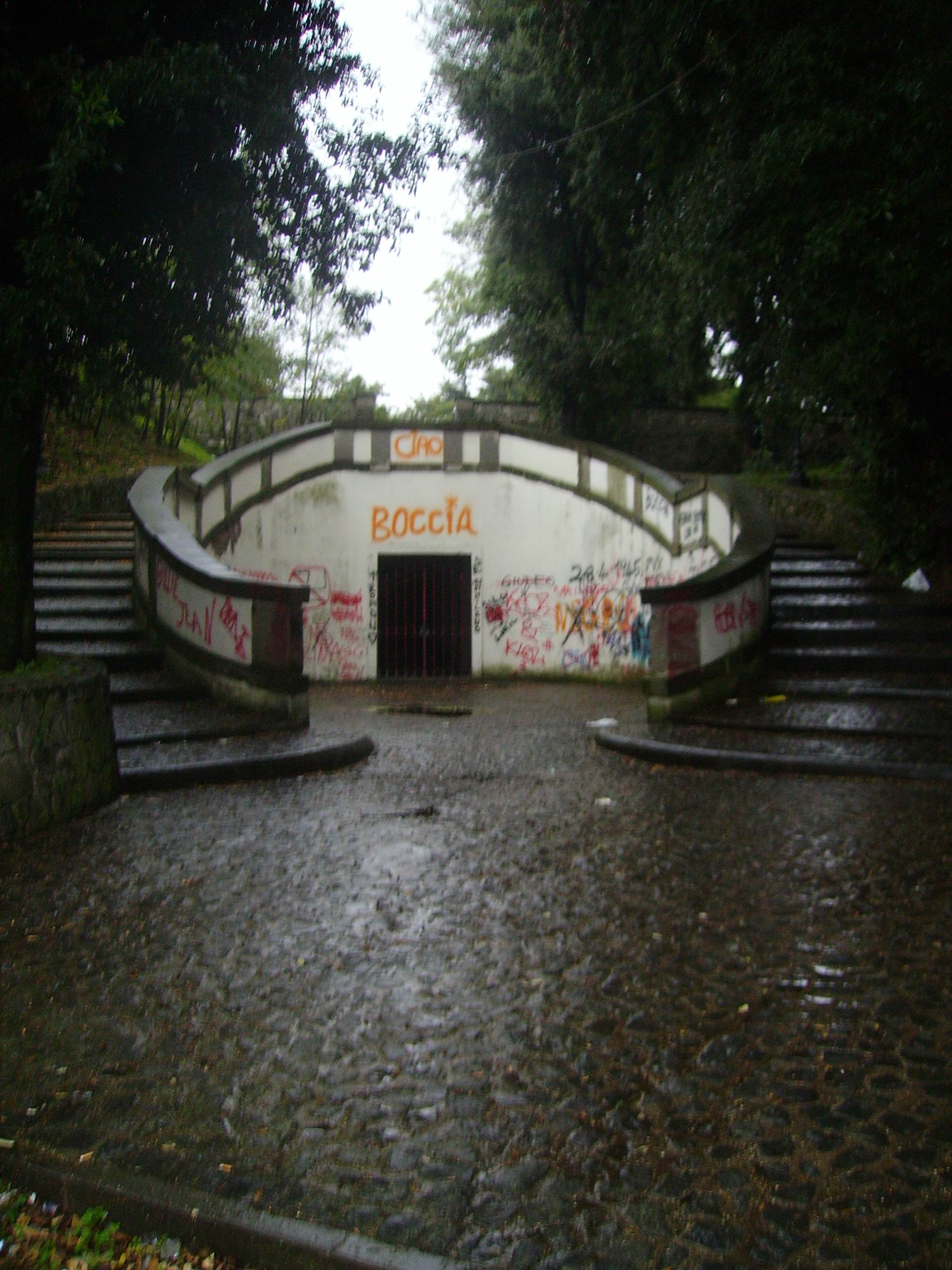
The staircase of the nymphaeum in the Villa Desideri public park.

The paid national press covering major news from the province is represented by the local editions of the Roman newspapers "La Repubblica" and "Il Messaggero", while sports news may appear in the local edition of "Corriere dello Sport-Stadio".

The main paid local publication is "Nuovo Oggi Castelli", which ceased publication in 2010. The paid local sports publication is "Il Corriere Laziale", founded in Rome in 1973.

The free daily newspaper "Cinque Giorni", based in Colleferro, has broader distribution throughout the southern part of the Province of Rome.

Other free local periodicals include "Controluce", a monthly publication of the Roman Castles and Monti Prenestini based in Monte Compatri, "La Voce dei Castelli", a monthly based in Santa Maria delle Mole, "Il Tuscolo", a monthly for the Tusculan area based in Frascati, "La Città Tuscolana", another monthly for the Tusculan area based in Frascati, and "Punto a Capo", a monthly no longer in print, managed by the eponymous cultural association in Marino.

Among online newspapers, ilmamilio.it and castellinotizie.it are gaining prominence.

The municipality has its own free monthly information publication, "Comune Informa": the same editorial staff, based in Marino, also manages the institutional monthlies of the municipalities of Ciampino and Rocca di Papa. In Marino, the free official periodical of the Diocese of Albano, "Millestrade", is published.

From 1952 to 1956, a group of young Marino residents published the monthly "Il Marinese", entirely dedicated to municipal news and issues: the initiative ended due to lack of funds and was revived several times (in the 1960s, 1980s, and 2006), without achieving the same success.

From the second half of the 1970s until the early 2000s, several newspapers emerged from Marino's cultural, social, and political left-wing circles: TuttoMarinoTutto; La Finestra; 4Righe; Il Gazzettino di Boville.

Numerous printing houses operate throughout the municipal territory, among which the "Santa Lucia" printing house stands out for its historical significance, founded in the 1920s by the mitred abbot Guglielmo Grassi and Zaccaria Negroni as part of the San Barnaba parish oratory. Many Marino residents learned a trade and found employment there, later starting their own businesses.

=== Music ===
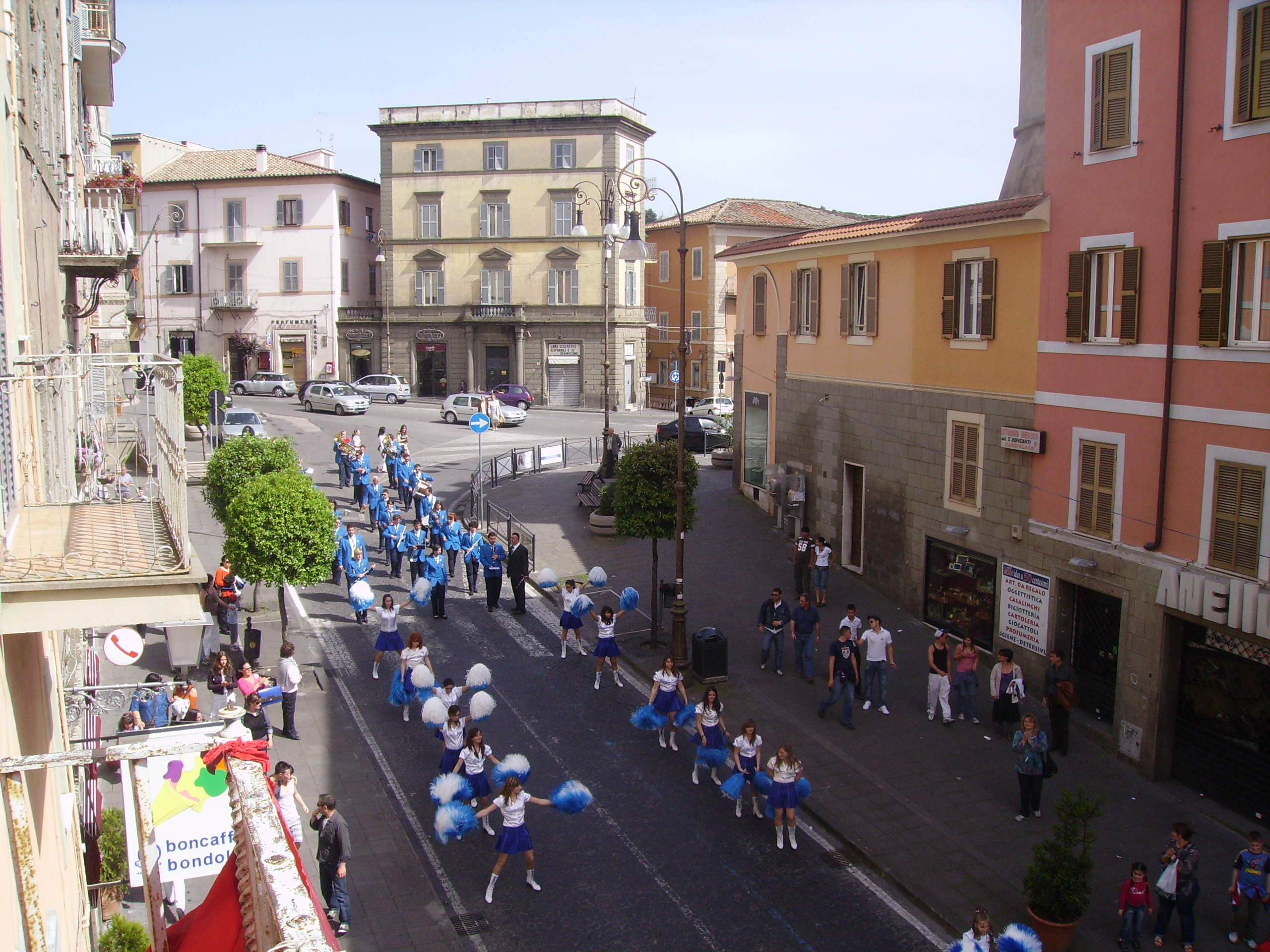
The "Enrico Ugolini" philharmonic concert band in full formation with its majorettes in winter attire.

Until the 18th century, the only education that received significant attention in Marino was musical: the "Constitutions of the Illustrious Community of Marino" of 1677 included an obligation for the community to maintain a public fund to pay a chapel master at the Basilica of San Barnaba to teach four talented boys the art of playing the organ for free. This practice likely existed as early as the 17th century, as Marino produced renowned musicians such as Bonifazio Graziani, a composer and chapel master at the Church of the Gesù in Rome, Giacomo Carissimi, a composer and chapel master at the Basilica of Sant'Apollinare in Rome, Giuseppe Ercole, chapel master at the Habsburg court in Vienna, and the two Falconi brothers, chapel masters—one at the Spanish royal family in Madrid, the other at the Portuguese royal family in Lisbon.

A musical band likely existed in the 19th century, as Massimo d'Azeglio mentions one in his "I miei ricordi" during his stay in Marino in 1824, and at the arrival of the first bersaglieri from Frosinone in September 1870, shortly after the Capture of Rome, the municipal band musically welcomed the newcomers. The first documented philharmonic concert was established in 1873, dissolved in 1886, reconstituted in 1909, dissolved again upon the death of its historic director Enrico Ugolini in 1961, and finally reestablished in 1975 by the pro loco association. In 1976, the band split into the "Enrico Ugolini" philharmonic concert, still active under the pro loco, and the "Città di Marino" band, which later dissolved.

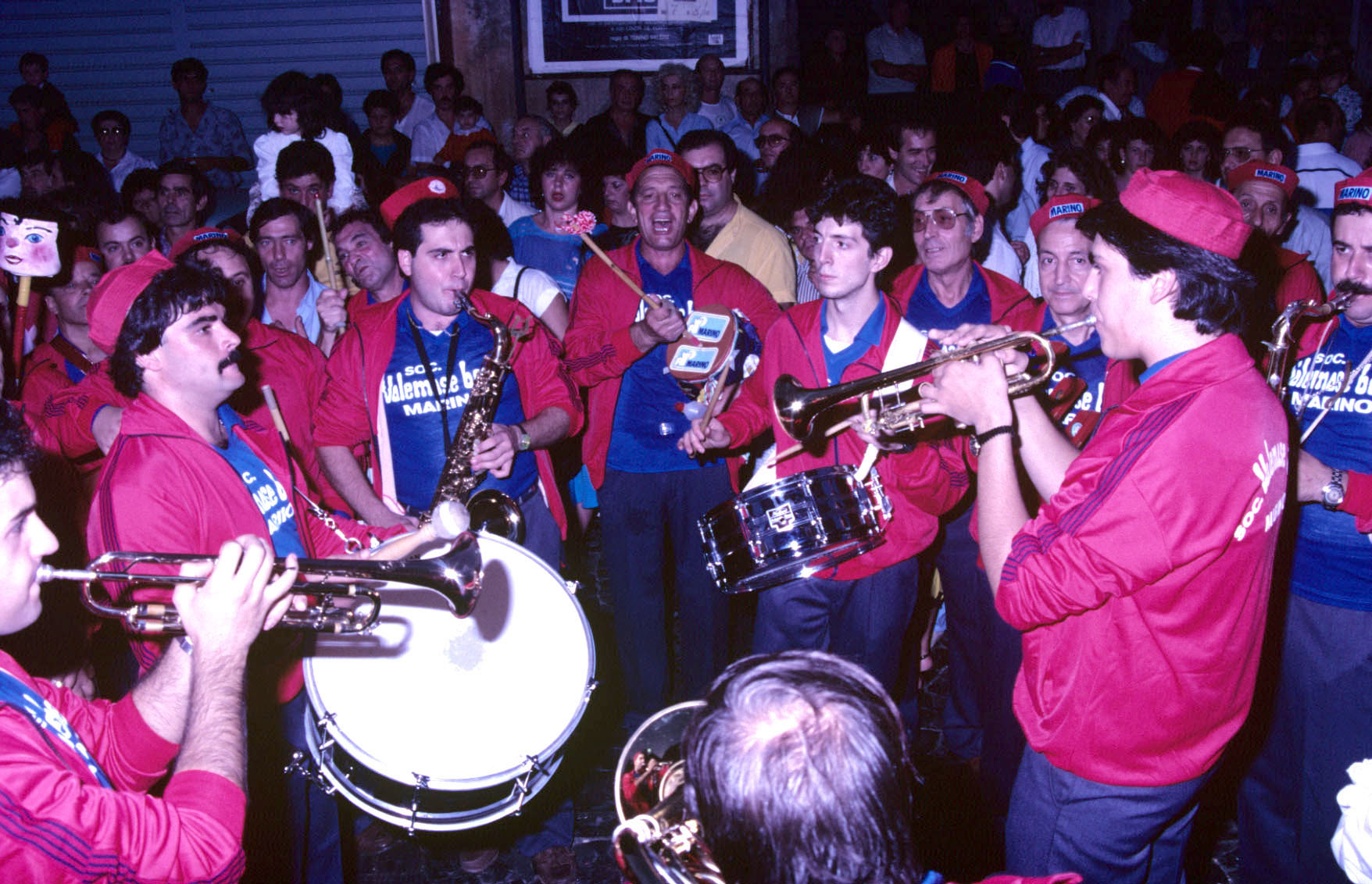
The "Volemose bene" band

Popular music emerged in the early 20th century through "entertainment societies," gatherings of friends with musical aspirations who used unconventional instruments (scissors, folding chairs, hammers, and barrels) alongside traditional ones such as the trumpet or flute. The oldest Marino entertainment society was "Marino brinda," now disbanded; the bands "Volemose bene" and "Ferentum" continue to thrive with great success.

The philharmonic musical ensembles currently operating in Marino and its territory are:

- "Enrico Ugolini" Philharmonic Concert;
- "Volemose bene" Entertainment Society;
- "Ferentum" Band.

Additionally, at least three choral ensembles operate in the city:

- "Città di Marino" Polyphonic Group;
- "Castrimoenium" Choir;
- "Giacomo Carissimi" Choir.

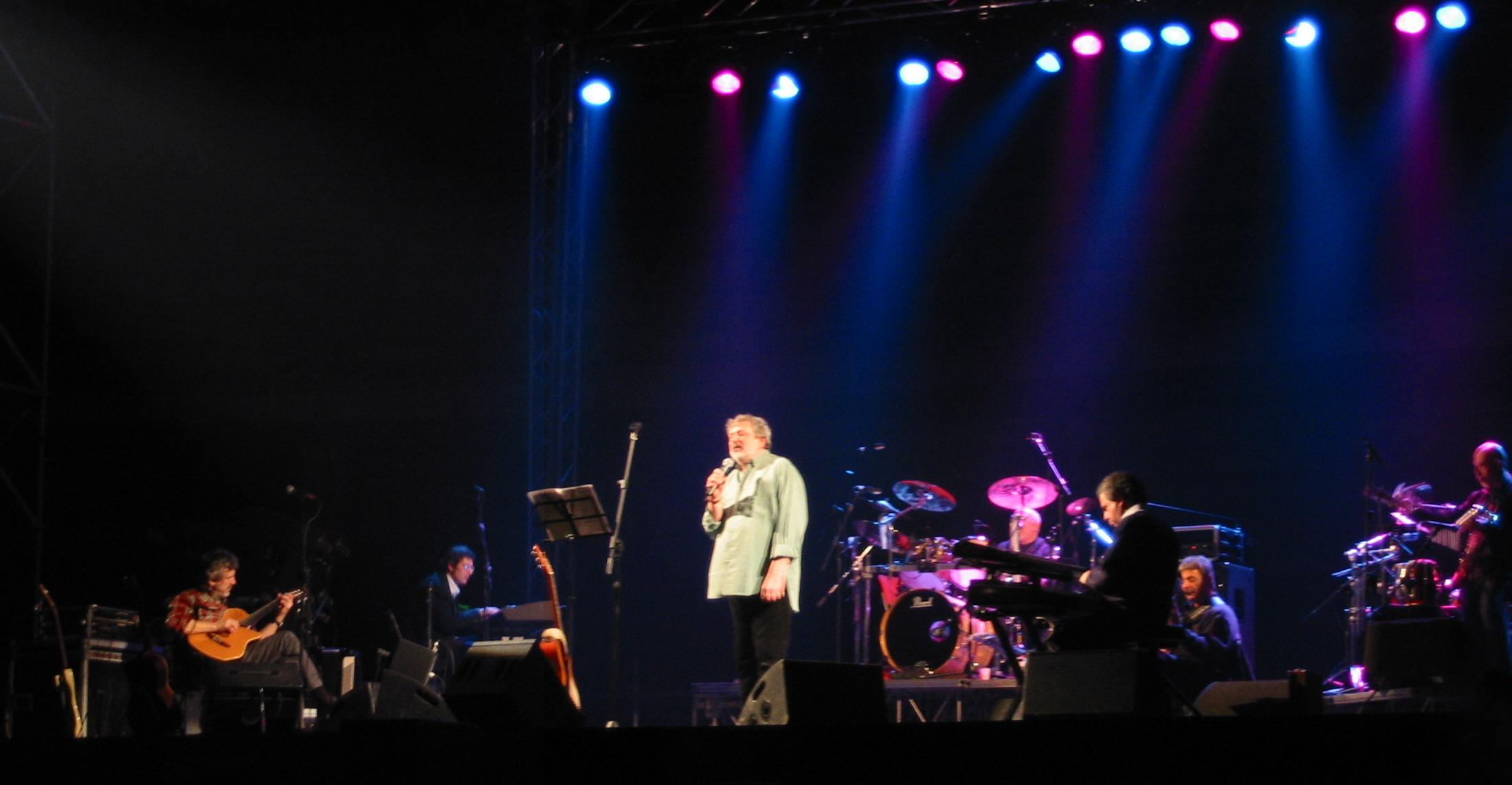
Francesco Guccini in concert at the Palaghiaccio di Marino in March 2003.

At the Palaghiaccio di Marino, a multipurpose facility built in the 1990s in the hamlet of Cava dei Selci, concerts by major national and international artists are frequently held: for example, in 1991, Frank Sinatra performed there, on 22 February 1994, it was the venue for the last Italian concert of the grunge band Nirvana, on 2 February 2003, a performance by the Red Hot Chili Peppers, on 10 March 2003, a performance by Francesco Guccini, and on 1 March 2006, a concert by Deep Purple.

Other notable concerts held in Marino include performances by Ricchi e Poveri at the forty-ninth Wine Festival in 1973, Anna Oxa in Piazza San Barnaba on 6 October 1986, for the sixty-second Wine Festival, and Gigi d'Alessio on 7 October 2007, in the same square (with a large screen set up in Piazzale degli Eroi) for the eighty-third Wine Festival. Marino is also the hometown of three of the seven members of the rock band Banco del Mutuo Soccorso: the founder and keyboardist Vittorio Nocenzi, his brother and pianist Gianni Nocenzi, and the second guitarist Filippo Marcheggiani. The band performed again in Marino during the Wine Festivals of 1970, 1992, and 2006.

=== Theatre ===
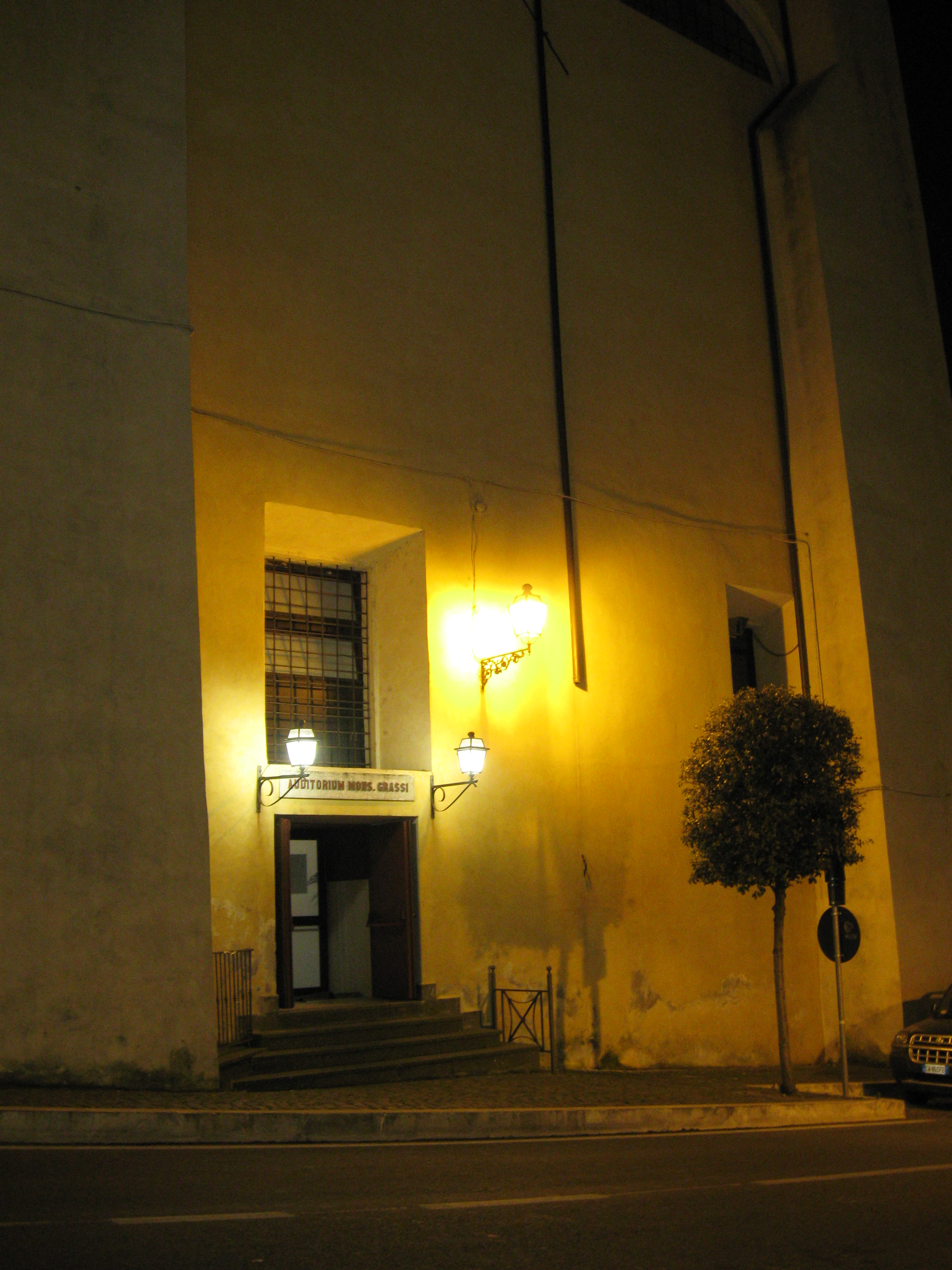
Entrance to the "Monsignor Guglielmo Grassi" auditorium.

Theatre in Marino dates back to the years of World War I, with the adaptation of the Coroncina oratory spaces, beneath the Basilica of San Barnaba, into a theatrical and cinematographic hall, initiated by the mitred abbot Monsignor Guglielmo Grassi. From the 1920s, the "Vittoria Colonna" amateur theatre company was established, and after World War II, the production of new theatrical works in the Marino dialect gained momentum, thanks to the efforts of many local authors, foremost among them Franco Negroni. In the 1980s, among the most prolific was Roberto Di Sante, with some works in dialect, including Cariolacciu and Bonu 'spidale. Currently, Cesare Schiaffini is a director and author of numerous comedies.

The largest and most prestigious theatre is the "Monsignor Guglielmo Grassi" auditorium, located in the aforementioned former Coroncina oratory spaces on Via Giuseppe Garibaldi beneath the Basilica of San Barnaba. Last restored in 2002 at the initiative of the parish abbot Aldo Anfuso after a long period of neglect, it has about 150 seats. This theatre is also used for conferences, concerts, and various parish initiatives.
Another theatrical venue in the historic center of Marino is the "Teatro delle Ore," inaugurated in 2004 at the pro loco association headquarters on the ground floor of Palazzo Colonna, used for performances but primarily for cultural events.
A third theatrical venue is the "San Giuseppe" parish theatre in the eponymous parish in the hamlet of Frattocchie, frequently used as a cinema but also for performances and conferences.

With the reopening of the "Monsignor Grassi" auditorium in 2002, several local acting companies emerged in the historic center:

- Gli Angeli della Pace (2002–2013).
- Nuova Filodrammatica "Vittoria Colonna" (2006).
- Piccola Accademia di Recitazione (2008).

The theatre periodically hosts performances by local and external companies.

A drama school is also active at the San Giuseppe parish in Frattocchie.

=== Cinema ===
The first movie theatre opened in Marino around the 1910s in the former Church of Santa Lucia. The cinema was silent, with sounds produced in the hall and amplified by the good acoustics of the Gothic former church. Subsequently, the parish abbot of the Basilica of San Barnaba, Guglielmo Grassi, arranged for a parish cinema to be opened in the underground spaces of the basilica, in the "Vittoria Colonna" hall (nicknamed by Marino residents as the "priests' cinema") adjacent to the theatre hall now named after him. This hall remained open until the 1970s when it closed for safety reasons, and in February 1955, the first CinemaScope film, The Robe (1953), was screened there.
In the period before World War II, a private cinema, the "Colizza" cinema, was established, which closed in the 1980s like many other Italian cinemas during a severe crisis largely due to the advent of commercial television offering an unprecedented selection of films. Currently, Marino does not have a movie theatre: only the "San Giuseppe" parish theatre in the eponymous parish in Frattocchie periodically screens films.

Federico Fellini filmed scenes of several films in Marino:

- Il bidone (1955) with Broderick Crawford, filmed in spring in Marino and then in Rome, between Cinecittà and Parioli; the film, however, did not receive significant acclaim from audiences or critics.
- Nights of Cabiria (1957; notable for the scene filmed between Via dei Laghi and the Pagnanelli restaurant in Castel Gandolfo, near Marino);
- Toby Dammit, the third episode of Spirits of the Dead (1967), with a long scene of Terence Stamp racing recklessly through the streets of the historic center decorated for the Wine Festival and then on the highway (the nearby Monte Porzio Catone junction on the A1 is recognizable);
- The Clowns (1970), with a vertical panoramic shot of the Baroque facade of the Basilica of San Barnaba and shots of local characters in the so-called "New Chambers" (Via Giacomo Carissimi).

Scenes of The Facts of Murder (1959) by Pietro Germi, inspired by Carlo Emilio Gadda's novel "That Awful Mess on Via Merulana", were also filmed in Marino, as parts of the novel are set in Marino and its territory.

=== Literature ===
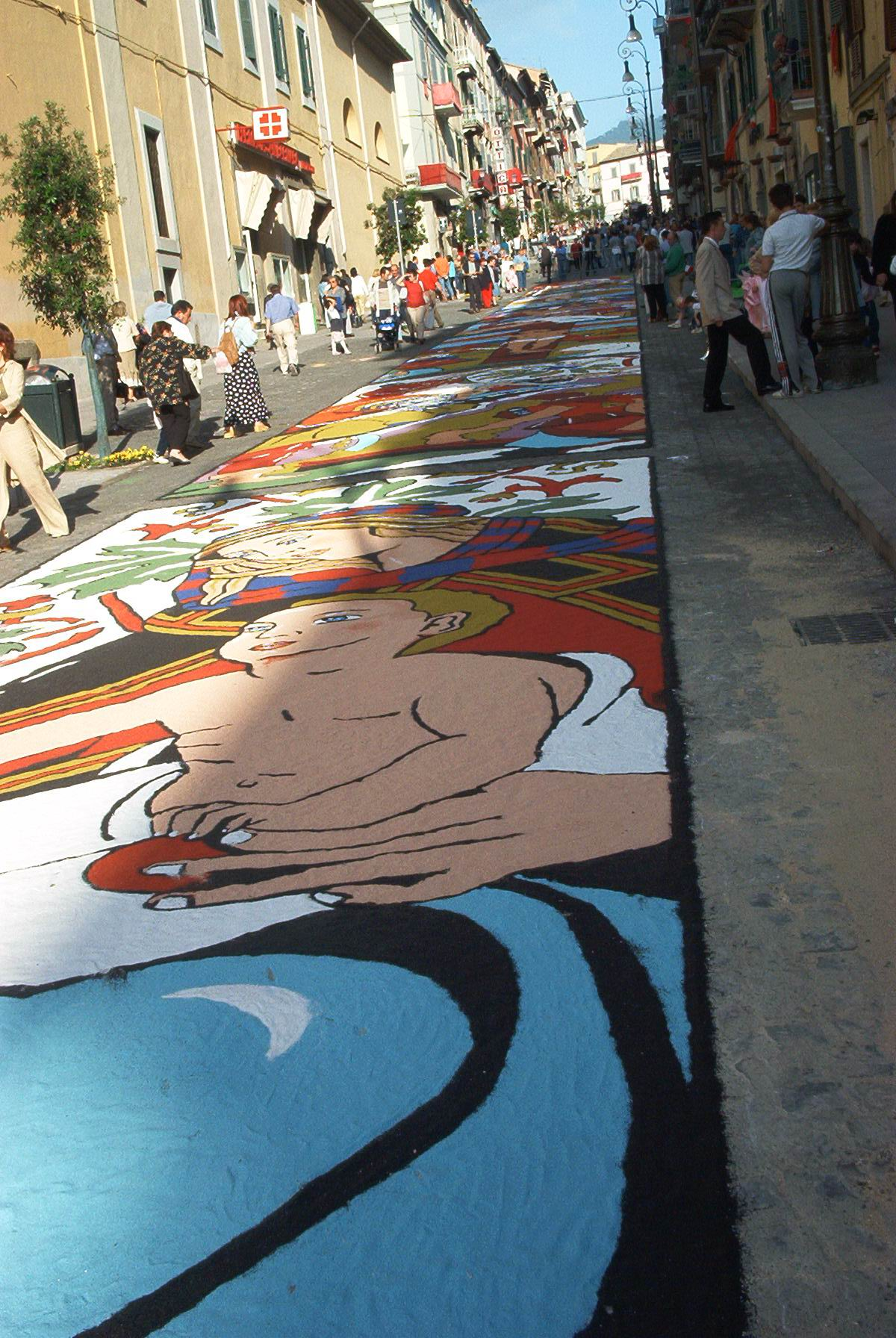
A small flower carpet on Corso Trieste for the Feast of San Barnaba on June 11, 2002.

The proximity of Marino and its territory to Rome and their location on a major route to Naples, another must-visit destination of the "Grand Tour" undertaken by Italian and European travelers in the 18th century, led several passing authors to write about the city: among them, Giacomo Casanova, who in his "Histoire de ma vie" recounts staying at the "old inn" in the current Piazza Giacomo Matteotti, not denying his reputation as a seducer, Ellis Cornelia Knight in her "Description of Latium" (1809), and Massimo d'Azeglio, who in his "I miei ricordi" provides a detailed account of his stay in Marino in 1824, describing customs, traditions, and real-life Marino characters such as Sor Checco Tozzi, his son-in-law Vincenzo Maldura, and the Marquis Fumasoni Biondi.

Marino also appears in several poetic works, including the poem "The Battle of Marino" in the "Poems in Velletri dialect" by Giovanni Battista Iachini (1884), which satirically recounts the sack of Marino by Velletri soldiers in the service of Pope Clement VII in 1526, the popular stornelli in Romanesco dialect "'Na gita a li Castelli" by Franco Silvestri (1926), made famous by Ettore Petrolini's interpretation, "Sagra d'amore" (1926) and "La Sagra dell'amore" (1926) by Giuseppe Micheli, and finally the works of Mario dell'Arco, collected in the publication "Marino Olimpo in terra" (1994).

The city and its territory also serve as the backdrop for a story in Luigi Pirandello's "Novelle per un anno" (1917), set in a villa overlooking Lake Albano between Marino and Castel Gandolfo, and especially in Carlo Emilio Gadda's "That Awful Mess on Via Merulana" (1957), where the Milanese writer ruthlessly depicts the desolation and poverty of the Ager Romanus countryside during the fascism years. Gadda also set a vivid story in Marino during a Wine Festival in "Il castello di Udine" (1934).

Among the historians and scholars who have studied Marino, its territory, and its history are Flavio Biondo (Italia illustrata, 1527), Carlo Bartolomeo Piazza (Gerarchia cardinalizia, 1703), Antonio Nibby (Viaggio antiquario ne' dintorni de Roma, 1819, Analisi storico-topografico-antiquaria della mappa de' dintorni de Roma, 1837, and New guide of Rome and the environments, 1849), Gaetano Moroni (Dizionario di erudizione storico-ecclesiastica, 1847), Girolamo Torquati (Studi storico-archeologici sulla città e sul territorio di Marino, manuscript), and Giuseppe Tomassetti (La Campagna Romana antica, medioevale e moderna, 1910).

=== Cuisine ===
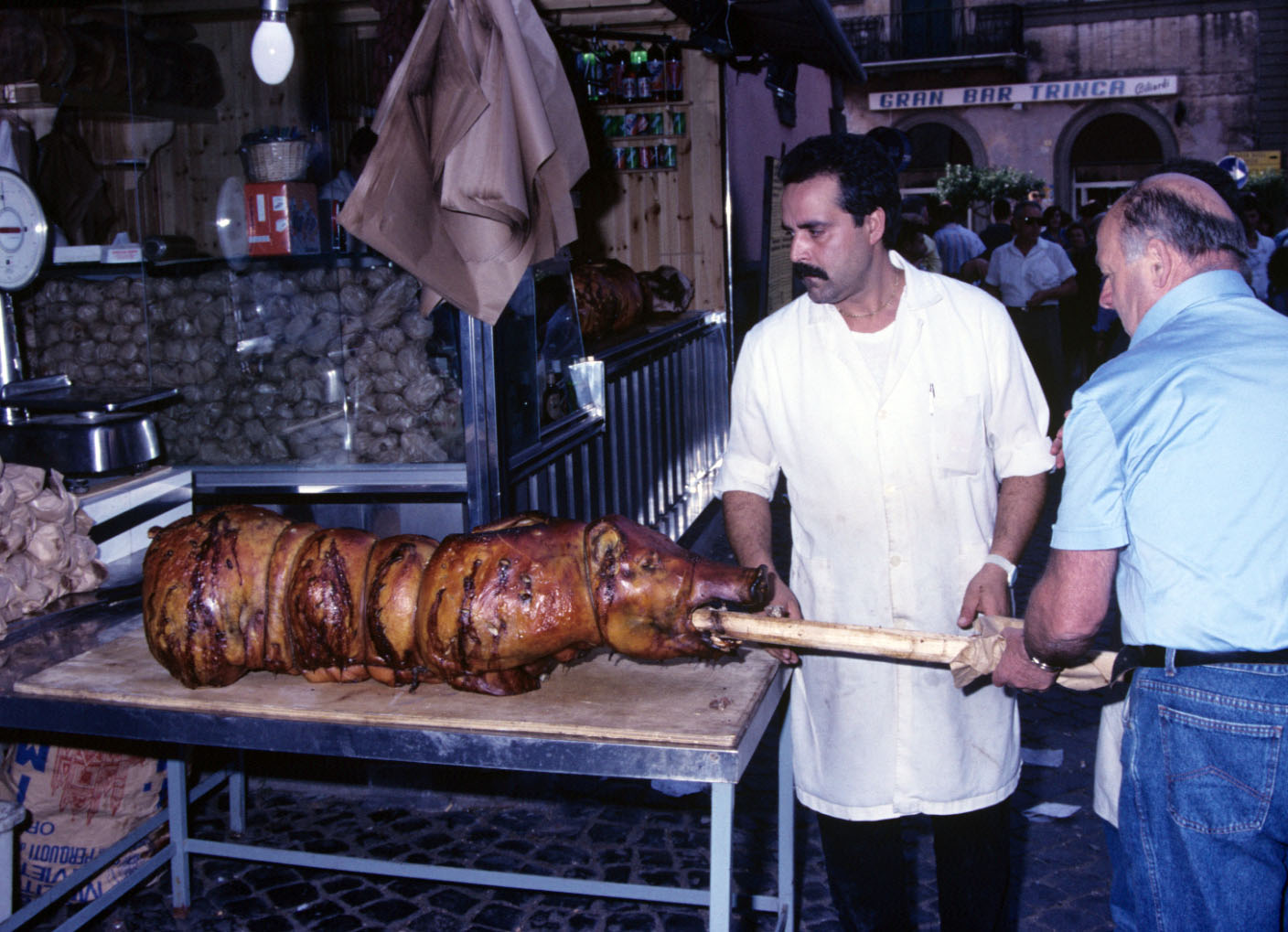
Porchetta in Marino

Marino cuisine is virtually indistinguishable from Roman cuisine, except for certain distinctive products such as porchetta (commonly associated with the nearby municipality of Ariccia, but widespread throughout the Roman Castles and other areas of Central Italy), pork "couples" among salumi, mustacciuoli (in a Lazio variant very similar to the Neapolitan or Salento versions), "brutti ma buoni," must ciambelle (a protected geographical indication product of Marino), and "biscotti della sposa" in the field of confectionery, and finally the local white wine.

=== Events ===
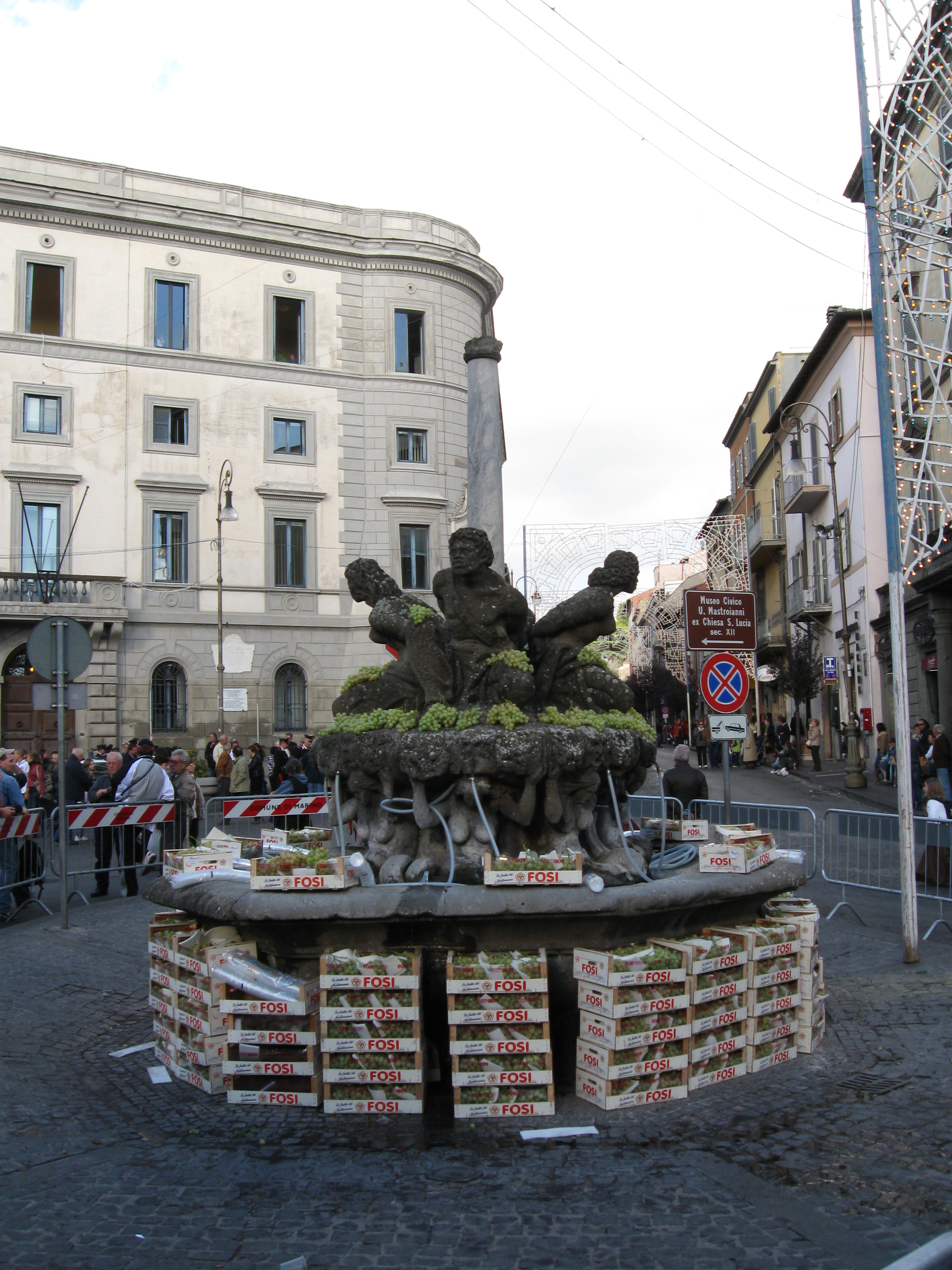
The Fountain of the Four Moors before the "miracle" of the fountains dispensing wine at the eighty-fourth Wine Festival (5 October 2008).

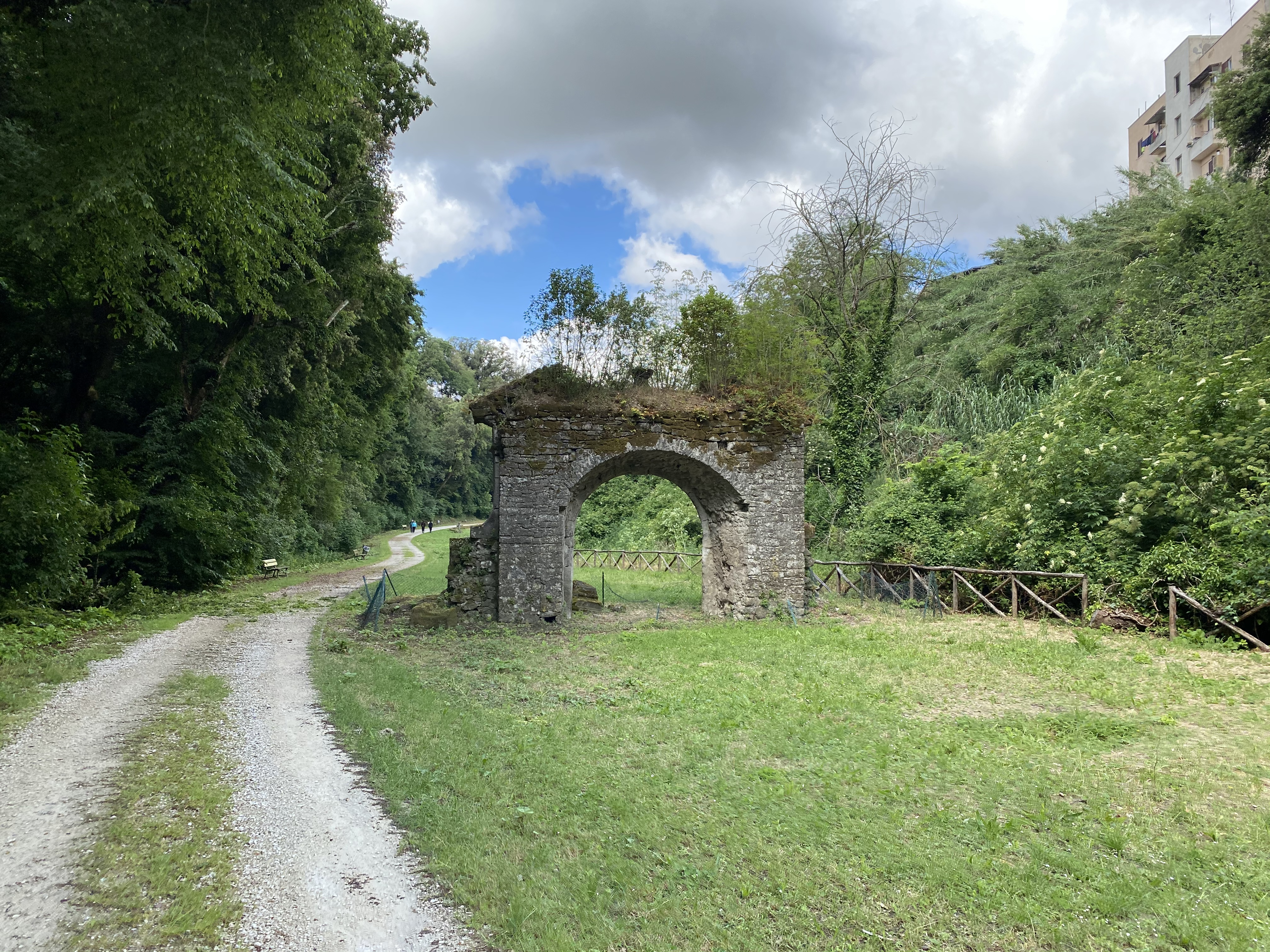
A glimpse of the Barco Colonna (June 2020).

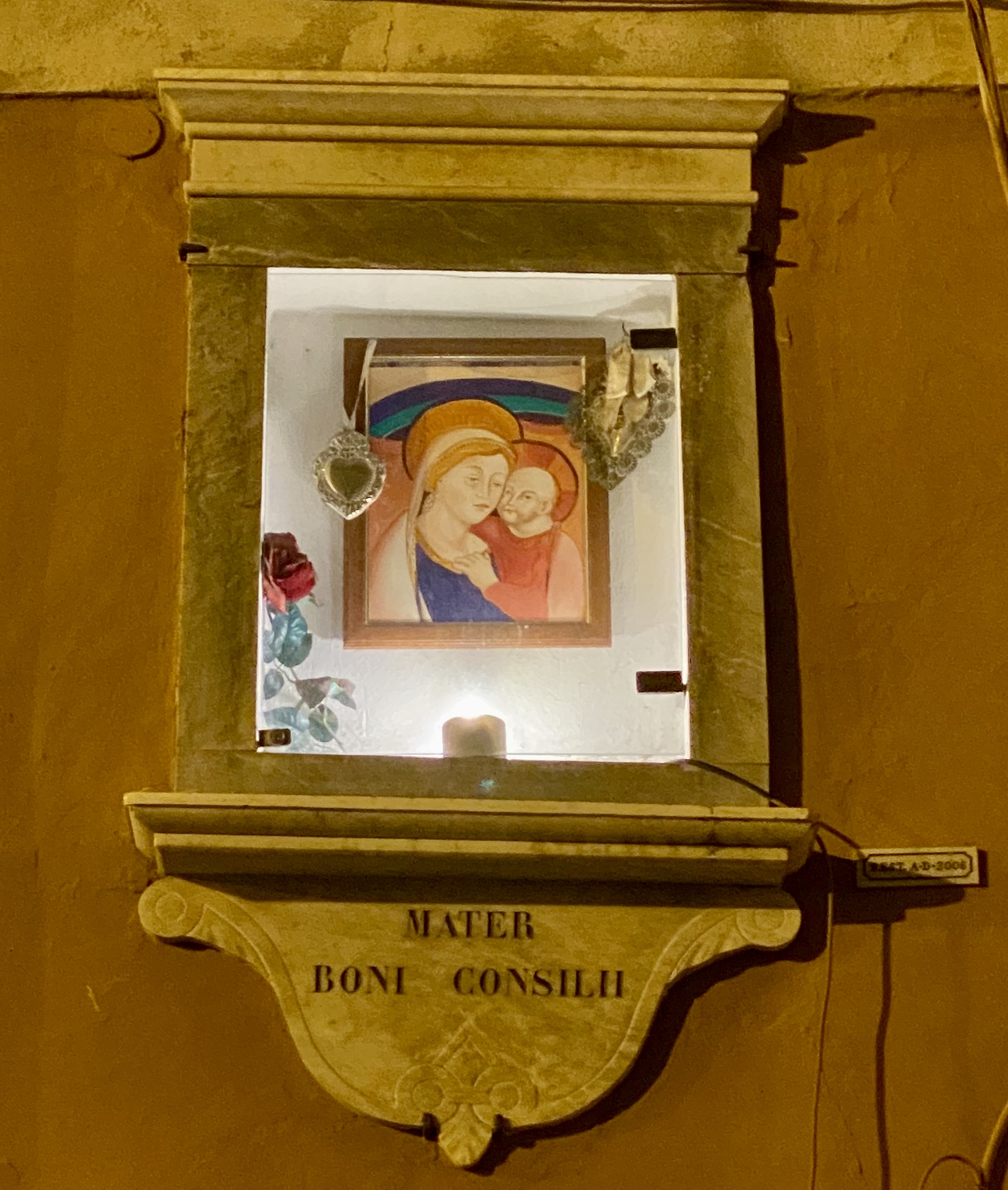
The roadside shrine of the Madonna del Buon Consiglio in Via Roma.

Wine Festival
The Wine Festival is the oldest of its kind celebrated in Italy. The first edition was held on 4 October 1925, inspired by the Romanesco poet of Marino origin Leone Ciprelli. The festival actually combines various sacred and secular celebrations: the feast of Our Lady of the Rosary, celebrated on 7 October as the patron saint of the Papal States since 1571 after the Christian victory in the Battle of Lepanto, and the celebration of the local wine production, anticipated by the establishment of the "Castromenie festivals" in 1904, within the context of the "Roman October" events. The festival is held every first Sunday of October, but the celebrations vary in duration in the days surrounding the event. The most famous feature of the festival is the renowned "miracle of the fountains dispensing wine," which first occurred in 1925 and has been repeated ever since. Other characteristics of the festival include the parade of allegorical floats, a tradition prominent before World War II but now largely diminished, and especially the historical costume parade in 16th-century attire, first performed in 1929.

Patronal Feast of Saint Barnabas
The patronal feast of Saint Barnabas is the religious celebration of the city's patron saint, held on 11 June each year since 1619, when the Community chose Saint Barnabas as patron, replacing Saint Lucy. According to legend, this decision was influenced by persistent hailstorms that damaged vineyards in June, or by the devotion of some members of the Colonna family to the Cypriot saint. Historically, a fair was organized for the feast; currently, a distinctive feature of the religious celebration is the solemn procession through the town's streets with the relic of the saint's arm.

Co-patronal Feast of Saint Lucy
The co-patronal feast of Saint Lucy of Syracuse, the city's patron until 1619, is celebrated on 13 December by a longstanding tradition likely originating in the 13th century due to the devotion of the Frangipane, with the reconstruction of the Church of Santa Lucia in Gothic style, repurposed for secular use in 1669. The wooden gilded statue of the saint is kept in the Basilica of San Barnaba. Distinctive features of the feast include the procession of young girls dressed in white preceding the religious celebration and the fair.

Feast of the Madonna dell'Acquasanta
The feast of the Madonna dell'Acquasanta is celebrated at the eponymous sanctuary in the Acquasanta quarter during the first week of September. The veneration of the Marian image painted in the sanctuary is very ancient, possibly dating back to a period between the 4th and 9th century.

Feast of Our Lady of Graces
The feast of Our Lady of Graces takes place on 28 May in the Borgo Garibaldi quarter, in the historic center. It is the feast of the eponymous church, built in an unspecified period, likely by the Confraternity of the Gonfalon of Marino and later granted in 1580 to the Augustinian fathers, before being established as a parish in 1954.

Feast of the "Mater Misericordiae"
The feast of the "Mater Misericordiae" (in Latin, "Mother of Mercy," as the Virgin Mary is called in the Salve Regina) takes place on 21 May in the Coste district, around a Marian shrine of unspecified date located in Largo Palazzo Colonna.

Feast of the "Madonna de 'u Sassu"
The feast of the "Madonna de 'u Sassu" (in Marino dialect, "Madonna of the Stone") takes place in the Borgo Garibaldi quarter since 1984 during the second week of July. The feast centers around a Marian shrine in peperino placed in 1596 at the beginning of Via Roma, along what was then the main road from Marino to Rome, to protect travelers.

Feast of Saint Joseph
The feast of Saint Joseph is held on 4 June at the eponymous parish in the hamlet of Frattocchie. Events are organized by a dedicated festival committee.

Feast of Saint Joseph the Worker
The feast of Saint Joseph the Worker is celebrated on the fourth Sunday of September in the Vascarelle quarter, around the statue of the saint placed in a corner of Piazza Europa. A distinctive feature of the feast is the Palio della Quintana, a chivalric tournament in costume inspired by the Saracen Joust in Arezzo, where the aim is to strike a dummy (the "Saracen") with a lance.

Marino Carnival
The Carnival has been organized by the municipal administration since 1987 and is currently held on Shrove Tuesday with a parade of allegorical floats organized by schools, parish oratories, and youth organizations, culminating in the burning of the "Carnival witch" in Piazza San Barnaba. Historically, however, the carnival celebration was extended by republicans and anticlericals even into Ash Wednesday, when the Catholic Church prescribes abstinence and fasting for the start of Lent. This was the Carnevalone, a tradition that began in the early 20th century and ended in the 1920s with the rise of fascism.

== Human geography ==
=== Urban planning ===
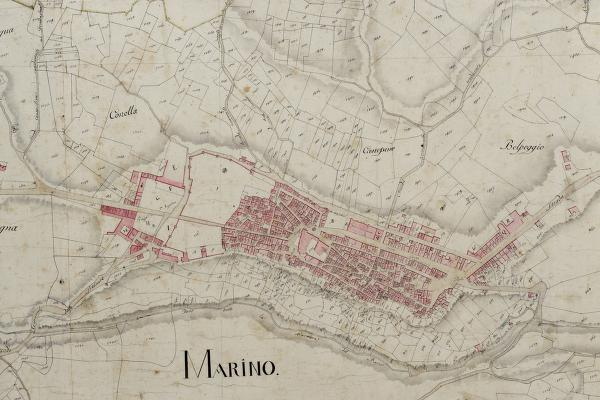
Marino in the Gregorian Cadastre (1816–1835)

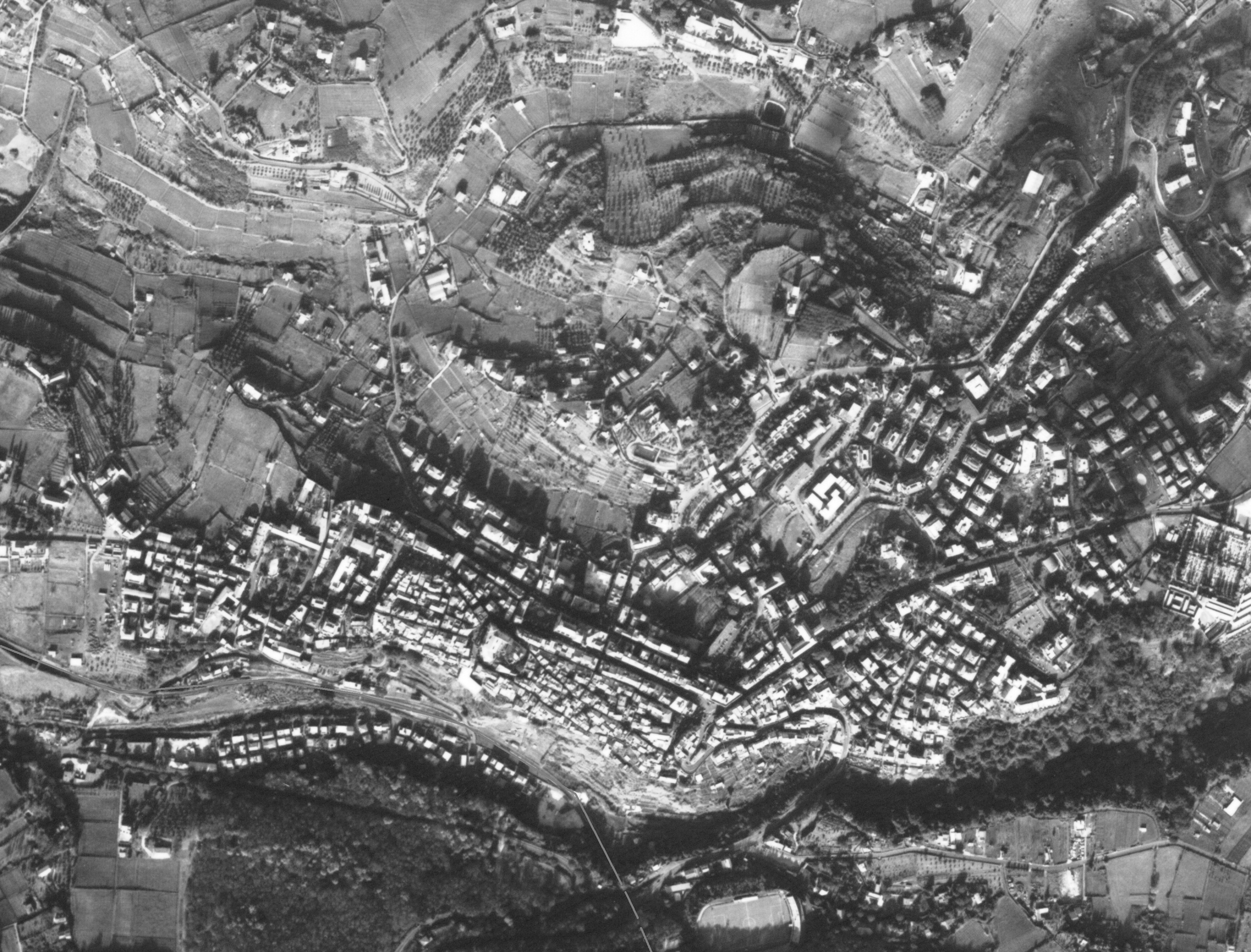
Marino in an aerial photo by the IGM from the 1990s.

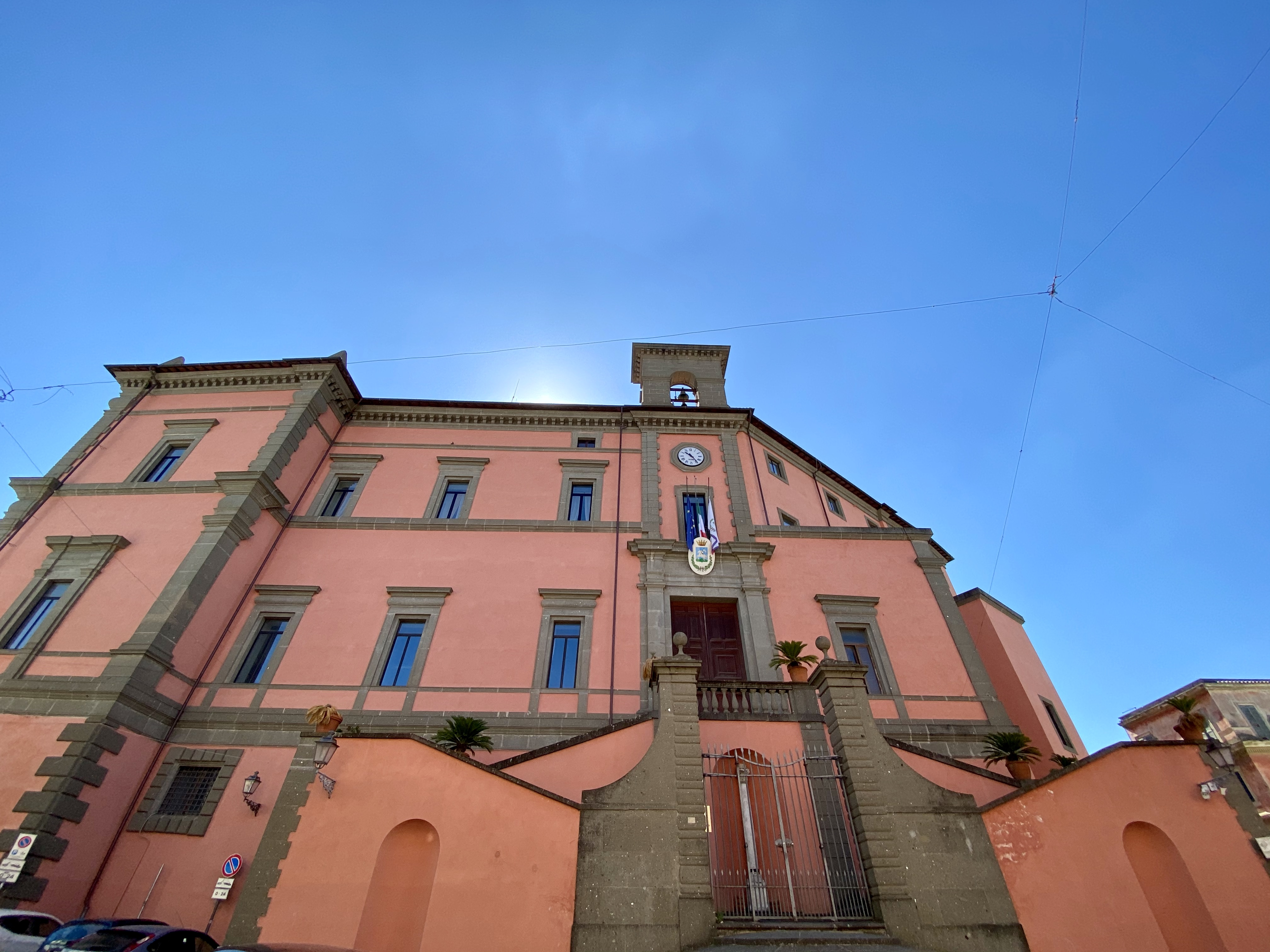
Main facade of Palazzo Colonna.

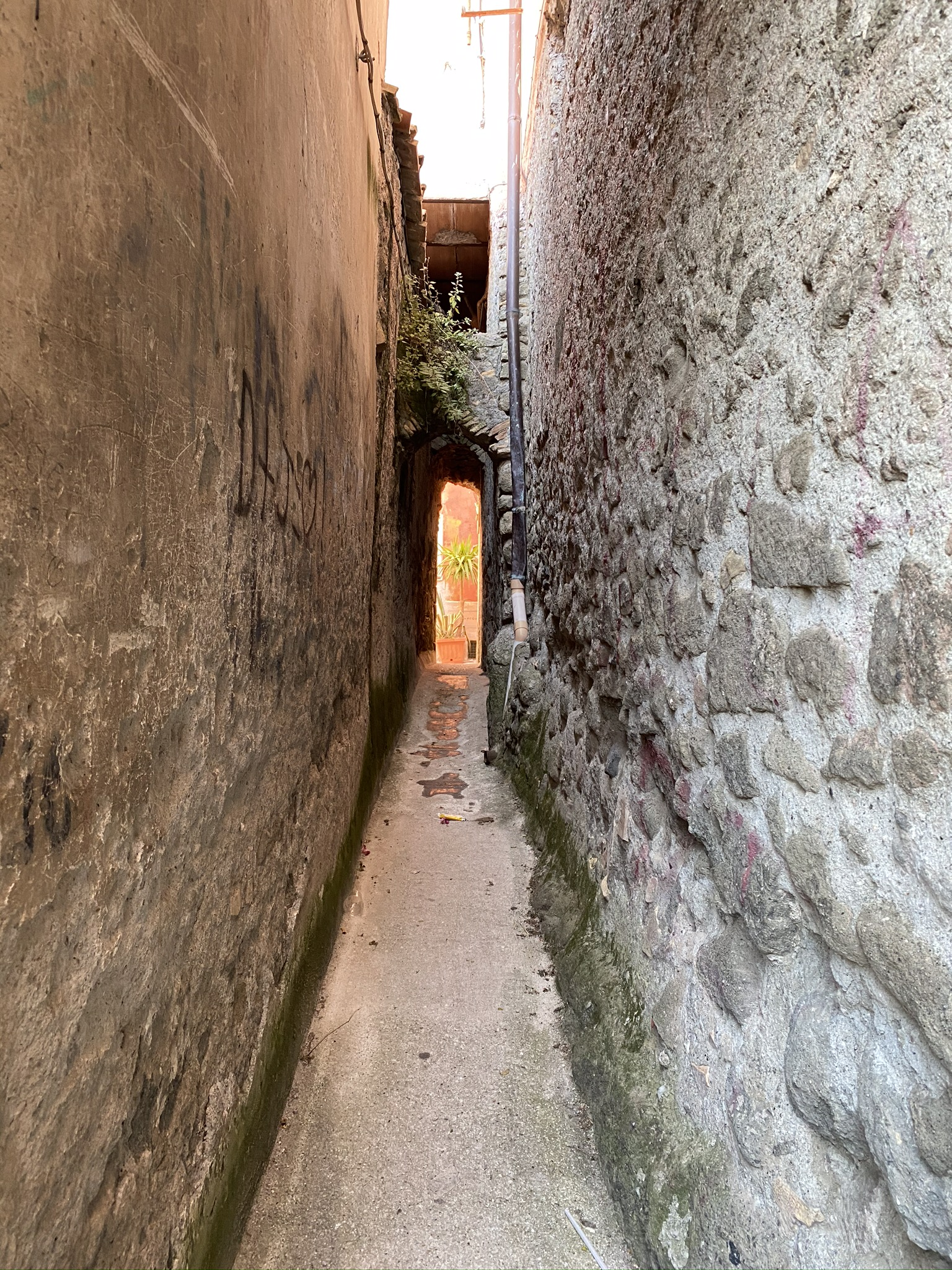
The "Vicolo Baciadonne" in the Santa Lucia district.

The historic center of Marino has developed over the centuries, taking on a shape technically defined as an "acropolis spindle," or an "L" shape with nearly converging sides.

The original core of the settlement has been identified in the current Castelletto district, as hypothesized by some scholars since the 19th century. In this early medieval quarter, the orthogonality of the streets suggests the ancient street grid of the Roman municipium of Castrimoenium.

Subsequently, from the late Middle Ages, the castle expanded toward the Coste district and the Santa Lucia district, reaching the area of the current Piazza Giacomo Matteotti, where the Frangipane fortress stood. Another fortification further downhill, built by the Counts of Tusculum in the 10th century, was expanded by the Orsini and, under the rule of the Colonna, became the current Palazzo Colonna. Around the mid-14th century, Giordano Orsini strengthened the walls of Marino, adding a new residential area (the "New Chambers") and constructing a fortification downhill along the Marana delle Pietrare.

Later, Ascanio I Colonna resumed the urban redevelopment of Palazzo Colonna, left incomplete by his mother Agnese di Montefeltro, and carried out the 16th century demolition of Via Roma. His successors, particularly Filippo I Colonna and his son, the cardinal Girolamo Colonna, undertook the urban reorganization of the castle, partially completing Palazzo Colonna, opening Corso Trieste, straightening Via Cavour, and building the Basilica of San Barnaba, creating an urban focal point in the central area of the settlement, between the current Piazza San Barnaba and Piazza Lepanto. Outside the walls, in the area of the current Piazza Giuseppe Garibaldi, a large open space toward Rome was created for fairs, surrounded by the convent of the Augustinian fathers at the Church of Santa Maria delle Grazie and the Dominican nuns at the Convent of the Santissimo Rosario.

Marino essentially maintained its urban configuration for four centuries, with no further expansion, so much so that Girolamo Torquati, a local historian and Catholic municipal councilor in the post-unification period, stated during a council meeting in 1877:

In a very limited space, 7,000 permanent residents are currently crowded, to which over 4,000 seasonal workers are added in the summer and autumn for agricultural work. The limited space is such that it is usually impossible for a visitor to Marino to find lodging even for a single night (...) The crowding of so many people, especially in the summer season, can be a trigger and cause of epidemic diseases despite the healthy air (...)

— Girolamo Torquati, resolution no. 38 of May 25, 1877.

Only in the early 20th century did new urban expansion begin with the construction of the "Grandi villas" and the start of urbanization in the area of the former Colonna Gardens, completed only in the 1950s. After World War II, the reconstruction plan approved in 1954 accounted for new expansion toward the current Vascarelle quarter, and between the 1960s and 1970s, the development of the Villa Desideri quarter was completed in the area of the former Villa Colonna di Belpoggio.

Meanwhile, the growth of the hamlet of Ciampino (which began with housing for World War I veterans) led to its administrative separation, ratified in 1974, and already with the 1954 reconstruction plan, the expansion of the hamlet of Santa Maria delle Mole began, followed later by Cava dei Selci, Frattocchie, and Castelluccia. An attempt at independence in 1993 with the autonomous municipality of Boville quickly failed.

The first general urban plan of the Municipality of Marino was adopted in 1976 and approved by the Regional Council of Lazio on 21 March 1979, with resolution no. 1057.

Subsequently, amendments were approved by the municipal council in 1989, ratified in 1994 by the regional council, and in 2000. The latter, much-debated amendment to the Plan, was approved by the regional council with resolution no. 994 on 29 October 2004.

Although the regional technical committee, in its session on 21 October 2004, cut over 4,000,000 m^{3} of new construction, the new amendment provides for significant urban interventions, mainly located in the hamlets. The most controversial is the establishment of a large D6 zone ("productive zones - industrial plants and artisanal activities") in the Divino Amore area, bordering the municipality of Rome, in an area where Legambiente had proposed inclusion in the perimeter of the Appian Way Regional Park. However, in the latest park perimeter expansion (17 October 2006), the Lazio Region excluded the Mugillae and Divino Amore areas, sparking protests from environmentalists about the urbanization of the area. Essentially, 1,000,000 m^{3} of concrete will be built in the area defined by environmentalists as "the last remnant of the Roman Countryside," accommodating a residential and workforce capacity of 8,000 people.

In 2008, the Municipality of Marino finally approved the construction of 462 affordable and social housing units in the Costa Caselle area and other residential housing in the Paolina area, both near the historic center.

=== Historical subdivisions ===
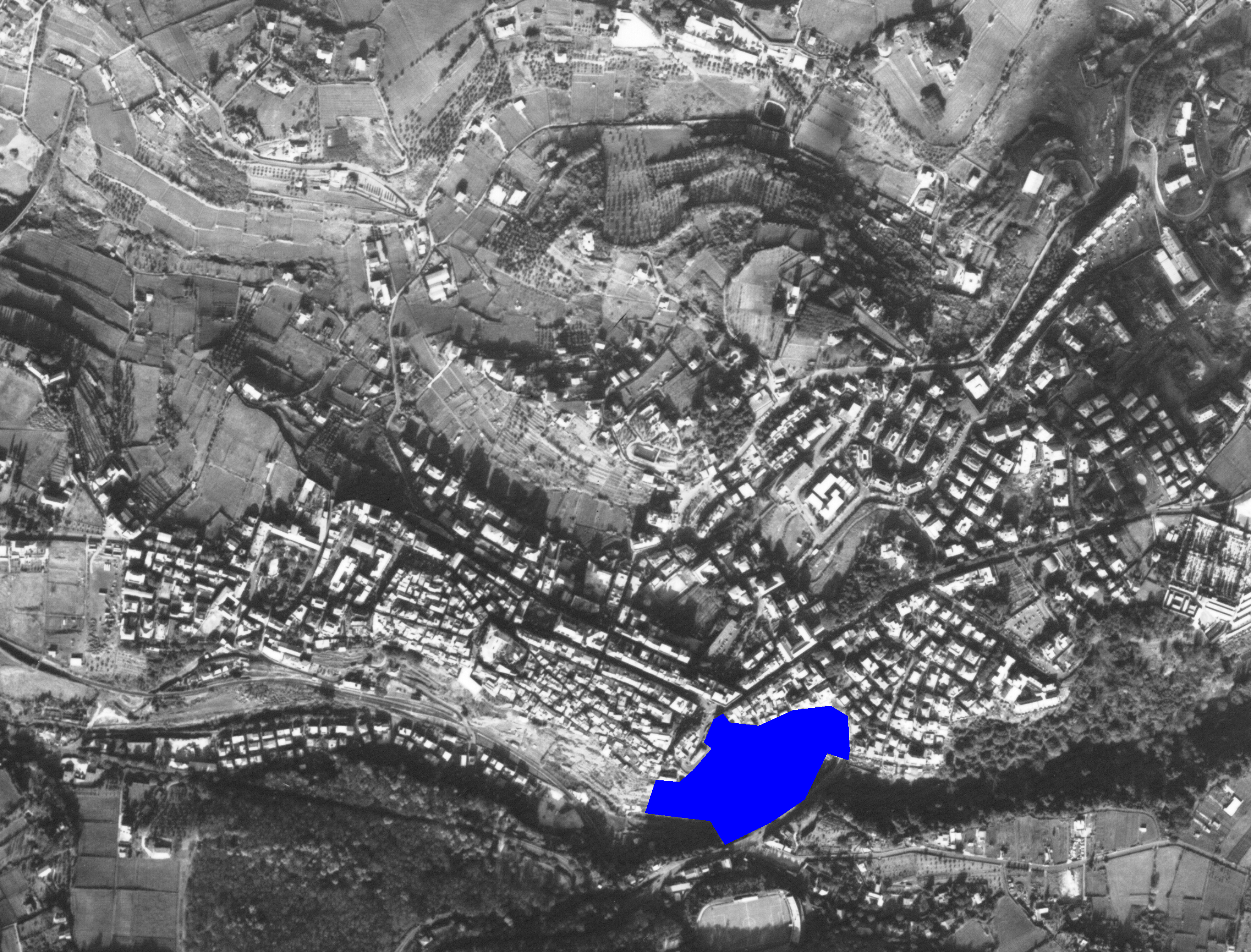
The Acquasanta quarter.

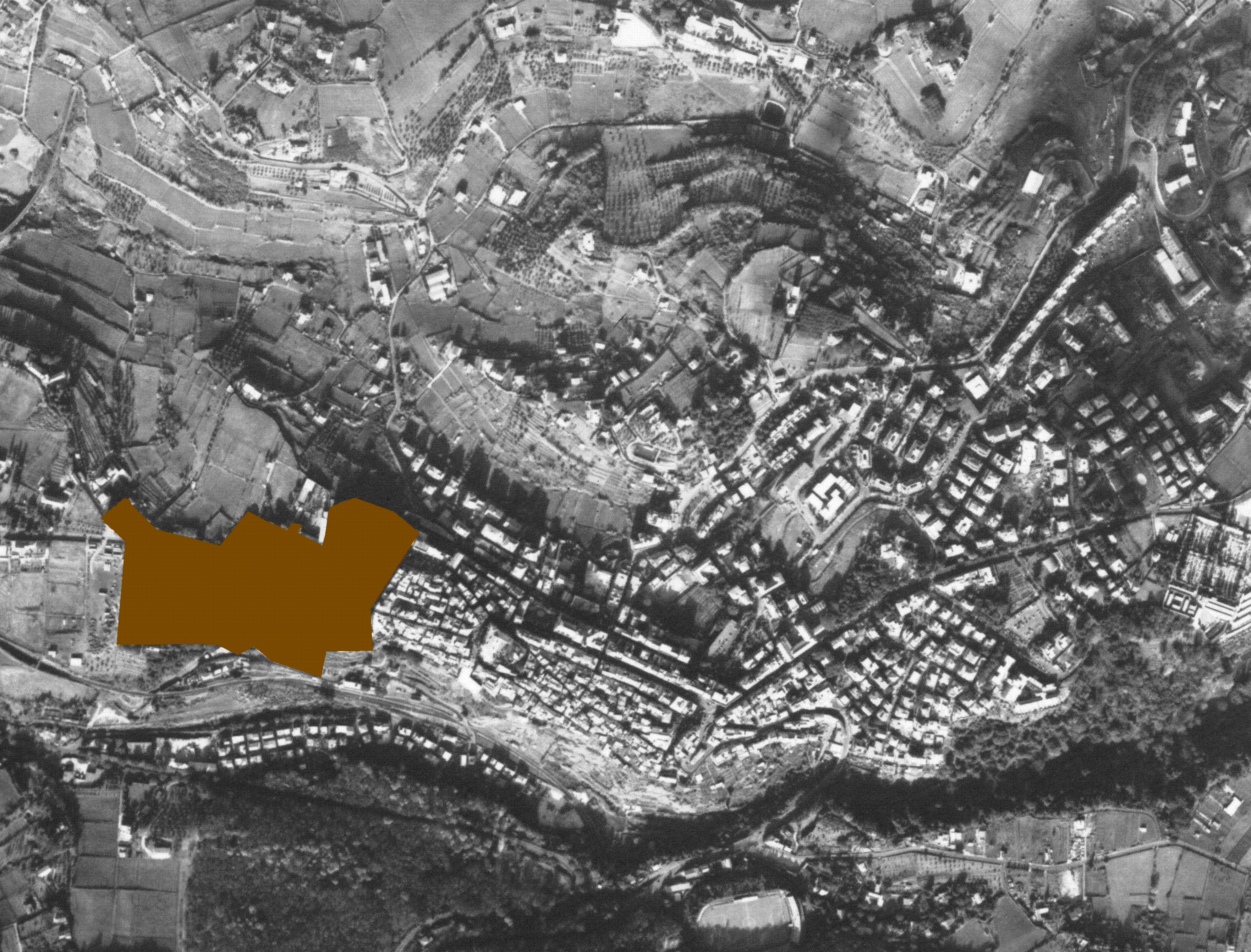
The Borgo Garibaldi quarter.

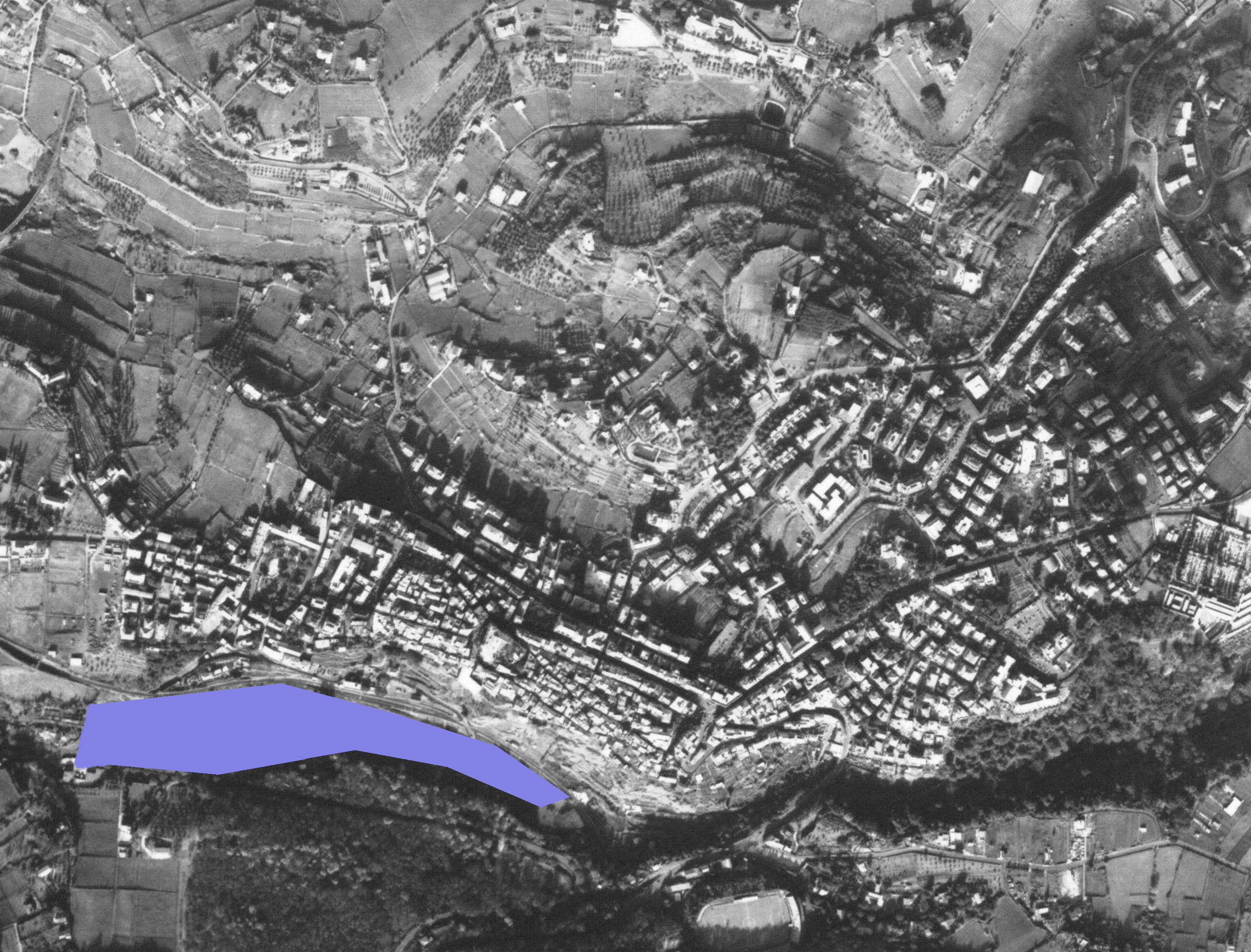
The Cave di Peperino quarter.

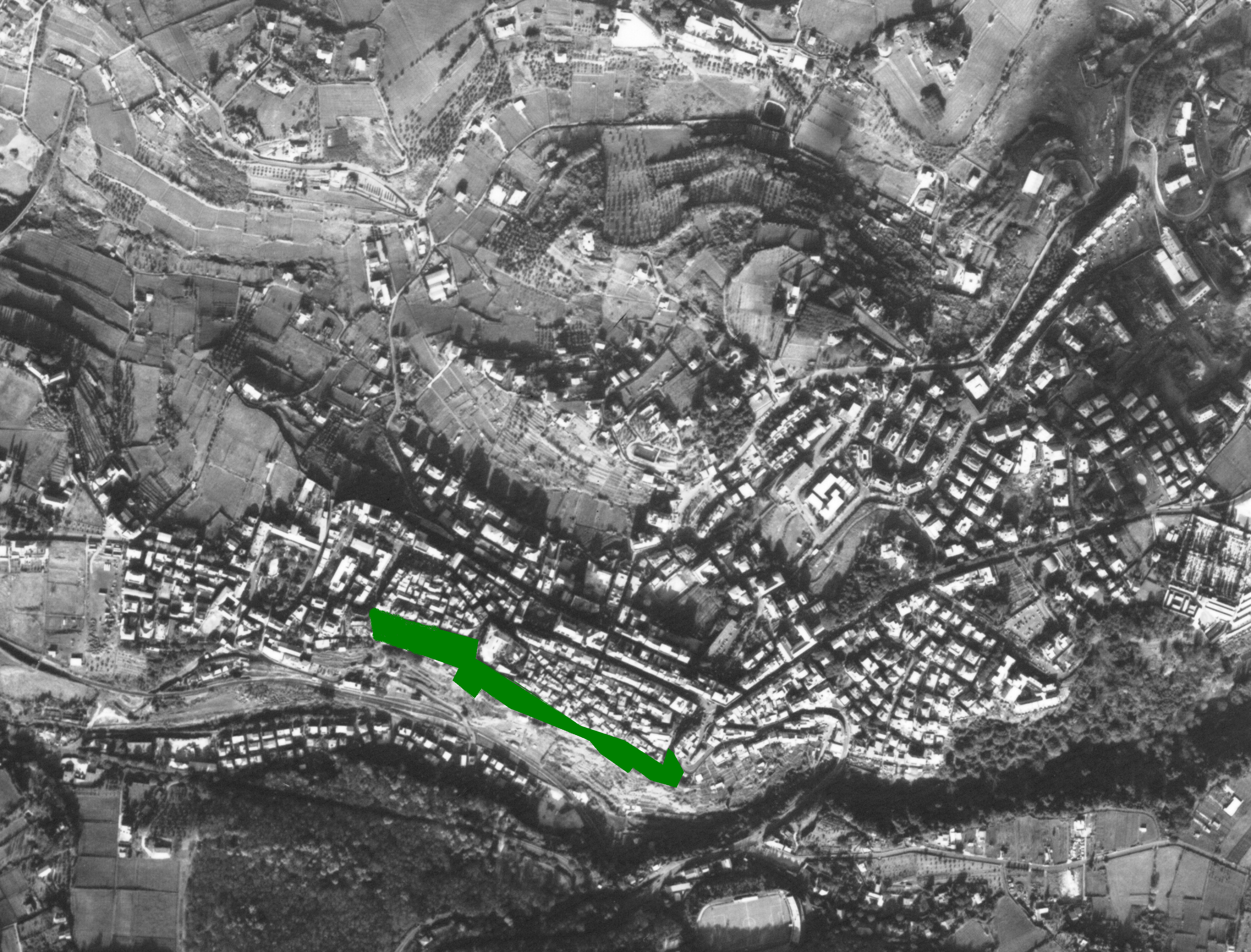
The Coste district.

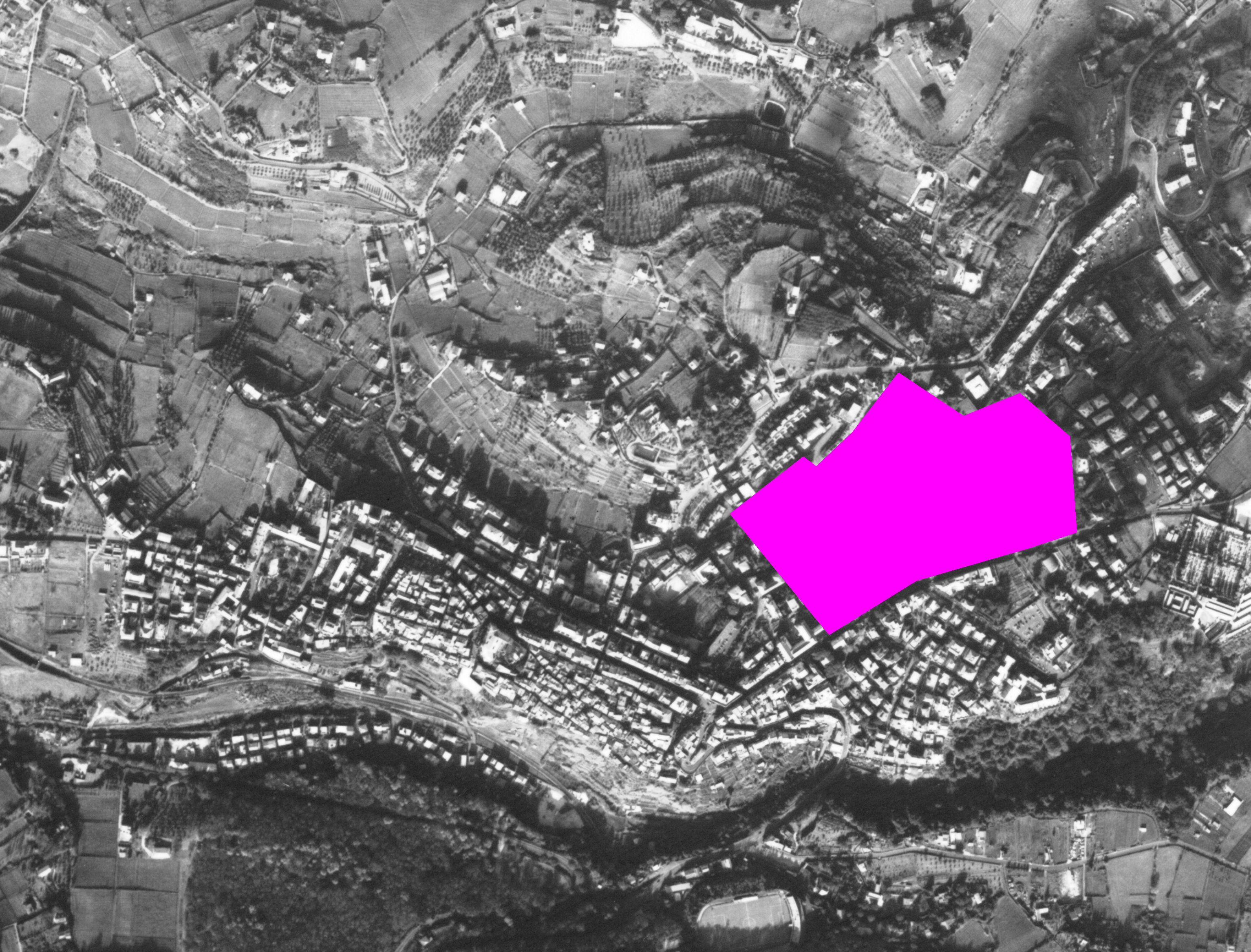
The Villa Desideri quarter.

=== Administrative subdivisions ===
Since 1992, the municipal territory has been divided into three circoscrizioni:

- District I: Marino center
- District II: Santa Maria delle Mole - Cava dei Selci, including the hamlet of Fontana Sala
- District III: Frattocchie - Due Santi - Castelluccia

== Economy ==
Traditionally, the main activity in the territory has been viticulture, which has always ensured a decent level of prosperity for Marino residents. For a long time, Marino was a destination for seasonal or permanent immigration, mainly from the towns of Southern Lazio.

Today, viticulture plays a far less significant role in the region, despite it still being a hallmark of the area. The service sector, also linked to the proximity of the capital, and the construction sector have seen considerable development. Commerce is moderately developed.

== Infrastructure and transport ==
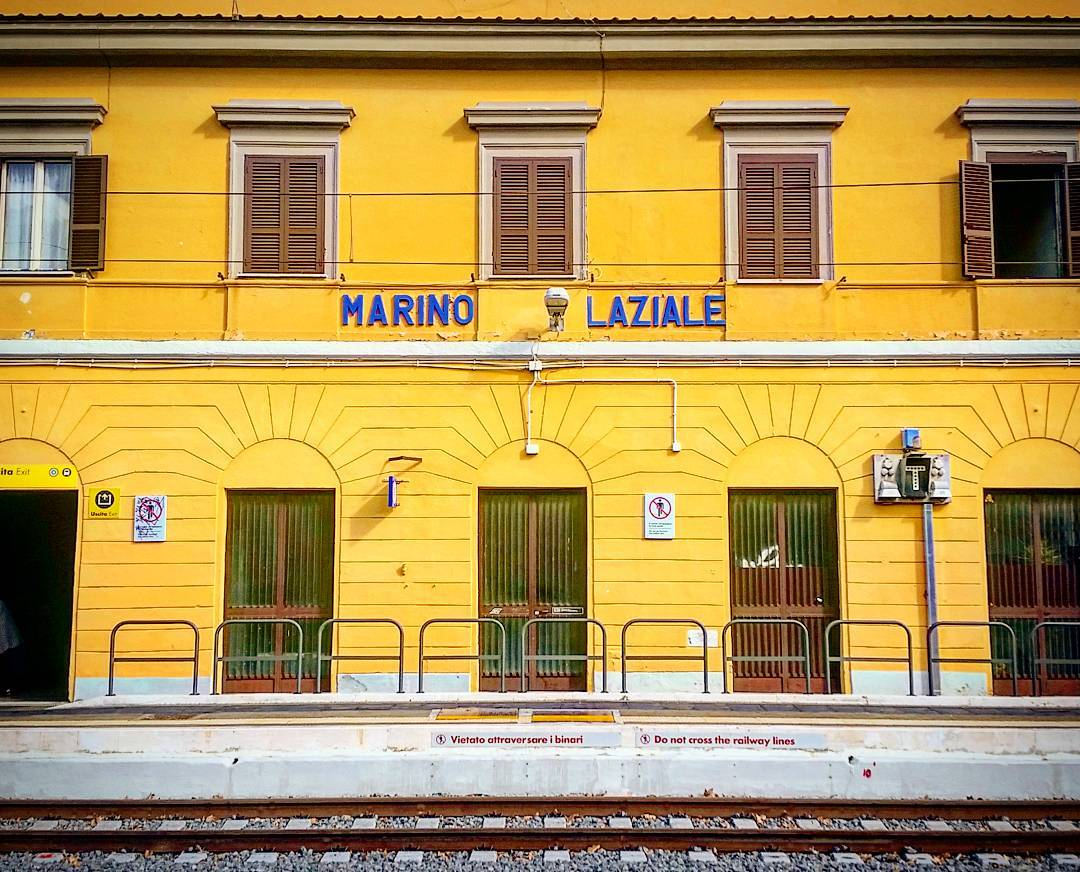
The Marino Laziale railway station on the Rome-Albano railway.

The territory of Marino is crossed by an important state road (the Appia), a regional road (the Nettunense), and various provincial roads, primarily the Maremmana III Inferiore and Via dei Laghi. In the past, Marino was a post station on the coach road to Naples.

The municipal territory is also served by the regional railways Rome-Velletri and Rome-Albano, and by regional and local public transport services. Between the 1910s and the 1960s, the important Tramways of the Roman Castles network was active.

== Administration ==
Period		Office holder	Party	Title	Notes
24 June 1996	1 May 2000	Rosa Perrone	PDS	Mayor	
1 May 2000	24 June 2002	Fabio Desideri	AN	Mayor	
24 June 2002	10 June 2003	Fausto Gianni		Prefectural Commissioner	
10 June 2003	23 April 2005	Ugo Onorati	DS	Mayor	
23 April 2005	30 May 2006	Ferdinando Santoriello		Prefectural Commissioner	
30 May 2006	29 April 2013	Adriano Palozzi	PdL	Mayor	
29 April 2013	26 May 2014	Fabrizio De Sanctis	PdL	Acting Deputy Mayor	
26 May 2014	10 April 2015	Fabio Silvagni	FI	Mayor	
10 April 2015	20 June 2016	Enza Caporale	Prefectural Commissioner		
20 June 2016	18 October 2021	Carlo Colizza	M5S	Mayor	
18 October 2021	in office	Stefano Cecchi	Centre-right	Mayor	

=== Twin towns ===
Marino is twinned with the following cities:

- (Belgium) Anderlecht
- (Italy) Assisi
- (Italy) Aversa
- (France) Boulogne-Billancourt, since 1968
- (Italy) Ischia
- (United States) Irving, since 1989
- (Greece) Nafpaktos, since 2004
- (Germany) Neukölln, since 1980
- (Spain) Paterna, since 1985
- (Netherlands) Zaanstad, since 1980

== Sport ==
=== Football ===
The main football club in the municipal area is Marino Lepanto USD. Founded in 1923, it currently competes in the Eccellenza league. The club also has an active futsal division. In the past, Marino Calcetto won the top-tier futsal championship.

=== Volleyball ===
- Marino Pallavolo ASD, which in the 2021–2022 season competes in the men's Serie B championship.

=== Sports facilities ===
- Palaghiaccio di Marino, Cava dei Selci;
- Domenico Fiore Municipal Stadium;
- Cava dei Selci Sports Hall;
- Attilio Ferraris Municipal Field, Santa Maria delle Mole;
- Via Marsala Field, Cava dei Selci;
- A. S. Blu 3000 Swimming Pool, Santa Maria delle Mole.

== Famous citizens and residents ==
- Maria Domenica Fumasoni Biondi (1766–1828), archeologist
- Vittoria Colonna, poet
- Giacomo Carissimi, musician
- Alessandro Crescenzi, footballer
- Domenico Pacini, physicist
- Orlando Fanasca, footballer
- Roberta Gemma, pornographic actress
- Luca Ippoliti, futsal player
- Giuseppe Ungaretti, poet
- Umberto Mastroianni, artist
- Anton Giulio Majano (1909–1994), film director
- Emidio Pesce, racing driver
- Hans Werner Henze, composer
- Jacoba of Settesoli (1190–1236), disciple of St Francis of Assisi

== Bibliography ==
- Ricci, Giovanni Antonio (1787). Memorie storiche dell'antichissima città di Alba Longa e dell'Albano moderno [Historical Memories of the Ancient City of Alba Longa and Modern Albano] (I ed.). Roma: Stamperia Giovanni Zempel.
- Lucidi, Emanuele (1796). Memorie storiche dell'antichissimo municipio ora terra dell'Ariccia, e delle sue colonie di Genzano e Nemi [Historical Memories of the Ancient Municipality Now Town of Ariccia, and Its Colonies of Genzano and Nemi] (I ed.). Roma: Tipografia Lazzarini.
- Ratti, Nicola (1797). Storia di Genzano, con note e documenti [History of Genzano, with Notes and Documents] (I ed.). Roma: Stamperia Salomoni.
- Moroni, Gaetano (1840). Dizionario di erudizione storico-ecclesiastica [Dictionary of Historical-Ecclesiastical Erudition] (I ed.). Venezia: Tipografia Emiliani.
- Nibby, Antonio (1848). Analisi storico-topografico-antiquaria della carta de' dintorni di Roma [Historical-Topographical-Antiquarian Analysis of the Map of the Surroundings of Rome]. Vol. I (II ed.). Roma: Tipografia delle Belle Arti.
- Gregorovius, Ferdinand (1973). Storia della città di Roma nel Medioevo [History of the City of Rome in the Middle Ages]. Torino: Einaudi.
- Torquati, Girolamo (1974). Studi storico-archeologici sulla città e sul territorio di Marino [Historical-Archaeological Studies on the City and Territory of Marino]. Vol. I (I ed.). Marino: Tipografica Renzo Palozzi.
- Tomassetti, Giuseppe (1910). La Campagna Romana antica, medioevale e moderna IV [The Roman Countryside: Ancient, Medieval, and Modern IV] (I ed.). Torino: Loescher.
- Chiarucci, Pino (1986). "Gli insediamenti laziali e quelli albani in particolare" [The Latium Settlements and Those of Albano in Particular]. In Pino Chiarucci (ed.). Il Lazio antico dalla protostoria all'età medio-repubblicana, Atti del corso di archeologia tenutosi presso il Museo Civico di Albano nel 1982-1983 [Ancient Latium from Prehistory to the Mid-Republican Age, Proceedings of the Archaeology Course Held at the Albano Civic Museum in 1982-1983]. Roma: Paleani Editrice.
- Del Nero, Raimondo (1990). La Valle Latina [The Latin Valley] (I ed.). Frascati: Parco regionale dei Castelli Romani.
- Rufo, Vittorio (1991). Marino - Immagini di una città [Marino - Images of a City] (I ed.). Marino: Banca di Roma.
- Antonelli, Vincenzo (1993). La chiesa della Madonna dell'Acquasanta in Marino [The Church of Madonna dell'Acquasanta in Marino] (I ed.). Veroli: Tipolitografia dell'Abbazia di Casamari.
- Del Nero, Raimondo (1994). Bovillae [Bovillae] (I ed.). Marino: Tipografia Gianni Palozzi. p. 121.
- Devoti, Luigi (1999). Cryptaferrata - Grottaferrata [Cryptaferrata - Grottaferrata] (I ed.). Velletri: Edizioni tra 8 & 9.
- Bedetti, Alessandro (2000). Dall'antiquarium al museo civico [From the Antiquarium to the Civic Museum] (I ed.). Marino: Comune di Marino.
- Del Nero, Raimondo (2002). La diocesi tuscolana dalla origini al XIII secolo [The Tusculan Diocese from Its Origins to the 13th Century] (I ed.). Frascati: Associazioni "Amici del Tuscolo".
- Devoti, Luigi (2002). Palazzo Matteotti a Marino [Matteotti Palace in Marino] (I ed.). Marino: Banca di Roma.
- Devoti, Luigi (2003). Frescati - Frascata - Frascati [Frescati - Frascata - Frascati] (I ed.). Velletri: Edizioni tra 8 & 9.
- Demontis, Luca (2017). "Enrico di Castiglia senatore di Roma (1267-1268). Diplomazia, guerra e propaganda tra il comune di "popolo" e la corte papale" [Henry of Castile, Senator of Rome (1267-1268). Diplomacy, War, and Propaganda Between the "People's" Commune and the Papal Court]. Antonianum, Medioevo 28. Roma: none.
