= Palazzo Colonna (Marino) =

Building in Marino, Italy

Coordinates: 41°46′11″N 12°39′31″E

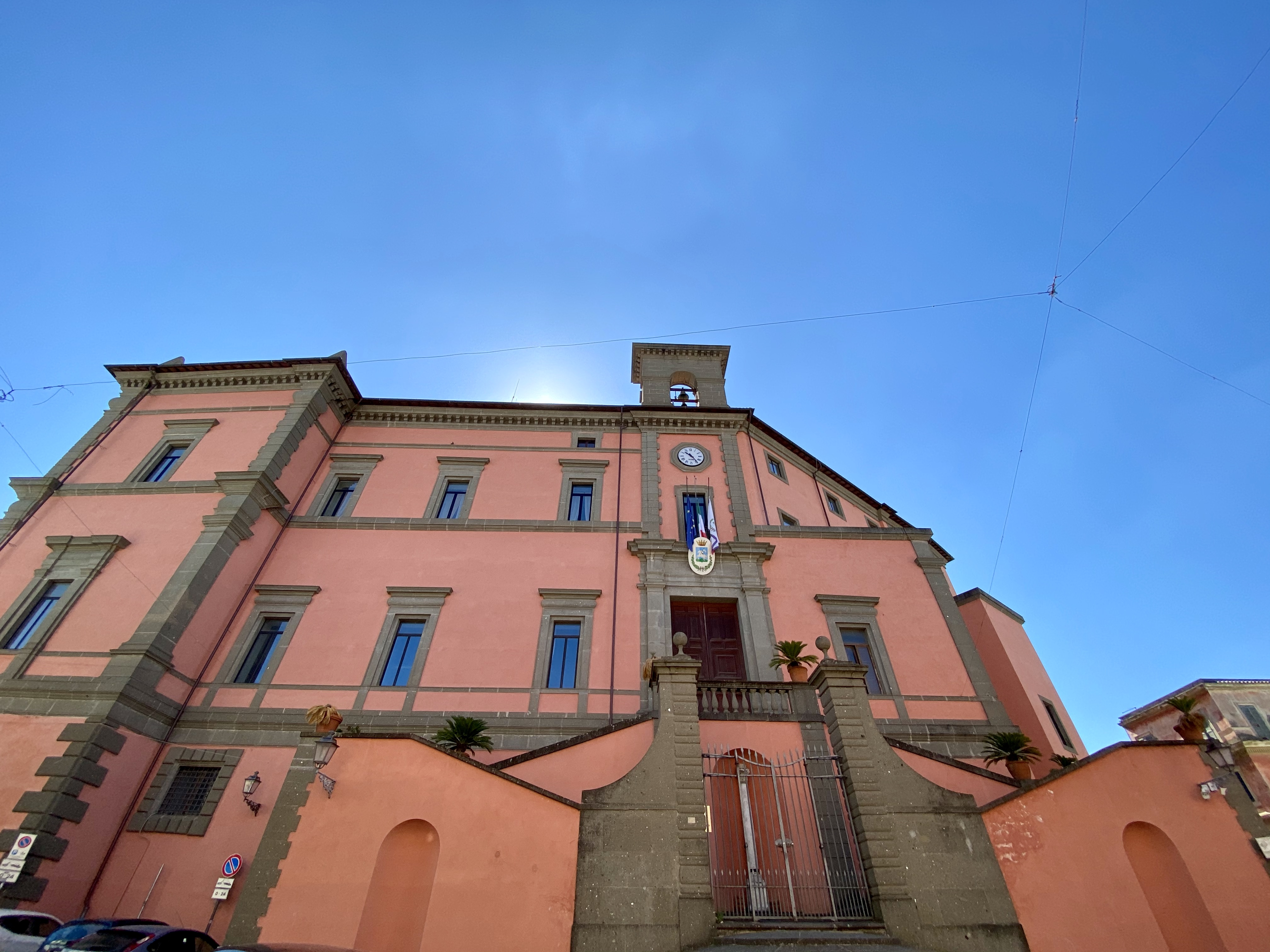
- The facade toward Piazza della Repubblica (July 2020).

General information
- Status: In use
- Architectural style: Mannerist
- Location: Marino, Lazio, Italy
- Year(s) built: 16th-17th century
- Client: Colonna family
- Owner: Municipality of Marino

Technical details
- Floor count: 4
- Lifts/elevators: 1

Design and construction
- Architect(s): Antonio da Sangallo the Younger

Palazzo Colonna is a historic building in the center of Marino, in the Roman Castles area of the Metropolitan City of Rome, Italy. Currently, it houses the municipal headquarters of the municipality of Marino.

The palace was built between the 1630s and the 1720s at the behest of various members of the Colonna family, exploiting the pre-existing structures of a fortification that probably already existed around the 11th century. The original design was entrusted to the architect Antonio da Sangallo the Younger, but the current appearance of the building – still unfinished on two fronts – is due to later interventions by other designers, including Girolamo Rainaldi.

The palace remained the personal property of the Colonna family until 1916, when it was given in perpetual emphyteusis to the City of Marino, which installed the municipal headquarters there. During World War II, the palace was almost completely destroyed by Anglo-American aerial bombardment on February 2, 1944; it had been rebuilt by 1958.

== History ==
=== The medieval period ===
During the Roman period, the territory of the historic center of Marino was occupied by the municipium of Castrimoenium, located, according to some scholars, either at the locality of Castel de' Paolis or at the present-day Castelletto ward, that is, in the oldest inhabited area of Marino.

The area to date occupied by the palace is located just outside, in a southerly direction, the perimeter of Castelletto, right along the line of expansion of the built-up area during the late Middle Ages, which would lead to the populating of the Coste and Santa Lucia districts. For these reasons, some scholars have been tempted to hypothesize that the Counts of Tusculum -whose lordship is attested in the area of the Alban Hills since the 10th century, and who probably also ruled Marino during the 12th century- had already built a tower or fortified building at this point on the hill.

In any case, when the castle came into the possession of the Orsini family they provided for the rearrangement of the entire perimeter of the castle walls, which in just a century suffered three sieges: in 1267 by the Romans led by Arrigo of Castile, in 1347 by the tribune Cola di Rienzo, and in 1379-after the battle of Marino-by the papal army obedient to Pope Urban VI. Thus, one can well understand the military importance of the fief, which was endowed with a new gate - Porta Giordana, probably dedicated to the feudal lord Giordano Orsini -, a new urban addition -the so-called Camere Nuove- and the defensive complex at the foot of the castle, along the valley of the marana delle Pietrare. This probably includes the construction-or modernization-of what was called the Orsini fortress, which occupied substantially the same area as the present 16th-century palace.

The construction of the Orsini fortress can be dated to the late thirteenth or early fourteenth century, since already during the period of strong feudal anarchy occurring in Lazio in conjunction with the Western Schism (1378-1417), with the weakening of papal power the fiefdom of Marino was stormed many times by different armies and a new fortress, with greater capacity to resist sieges than the old fortress of the Frangipani family, located at the highest point of the castle, i.e., near the present Piazza Giacomo Matteotti, had already been built.

=== 15th and 16th centuries ===
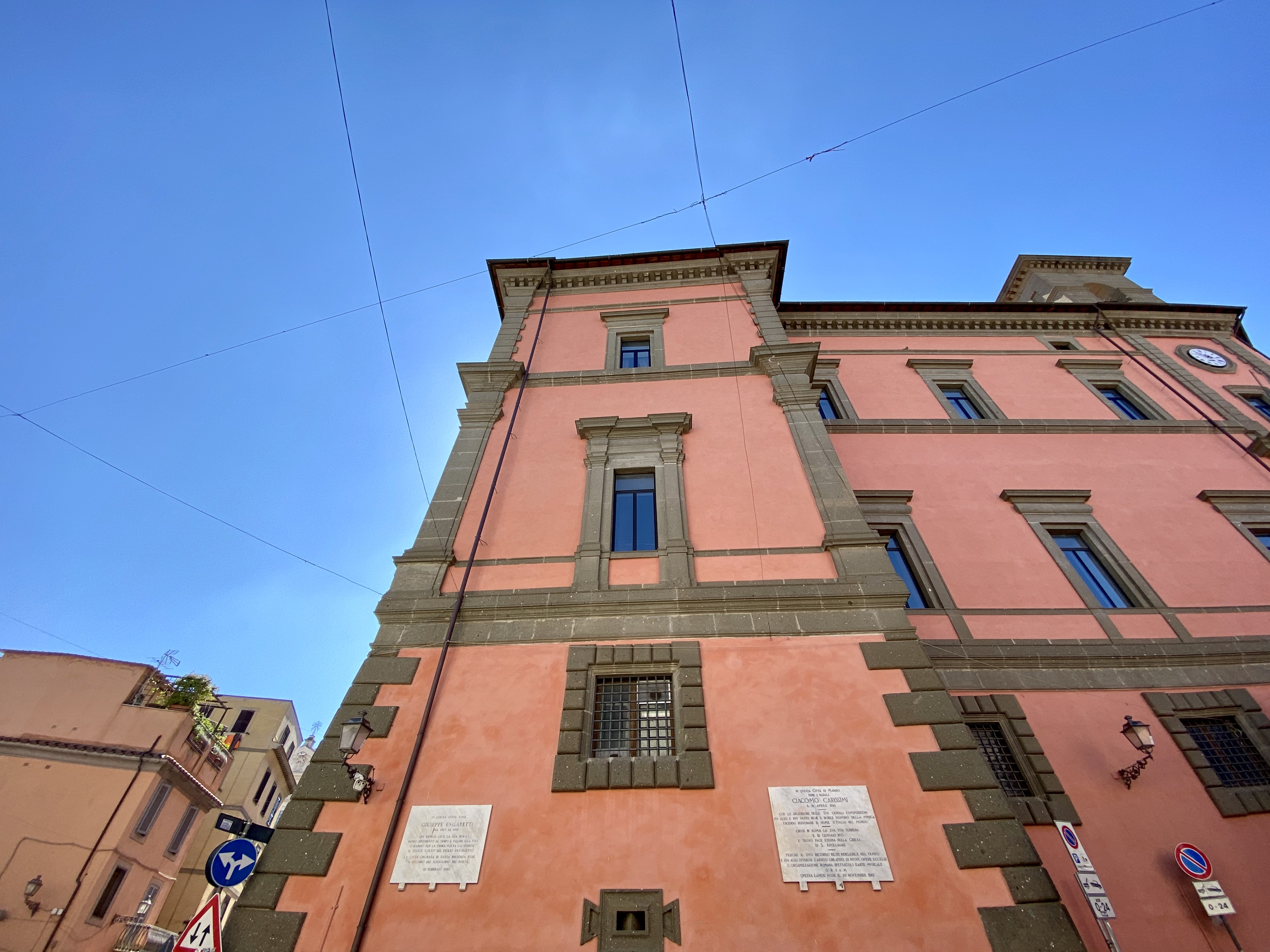
The quadrangular bastion of the palace (July 2020)

The fiefdom of Marino was purchased by the Colonna family in 1417, for the sum of 12,000 florins, in a very favorable period for this Roman baronial family: in fact, the Council of Constance had just patched up the Western Schism with the election of Pope Martin V, born Oddone Colonna. It was Martin V himself who went to Marino in 1423, to the bedside of his dying brother Giordano. At that time, the baronial residence was located in the Orsini fortress, which by then had become Colonna, and in a century would set out to become the present palace. Important personalities who stayed in the fortress before it was redesigned include Agnese di Montefeltro, wife of Fabrizio I Colonna -who stayed almost continuously in Marino between 1489 and 1523-, Vittoria Colonna -who was born there in 1490 or 1492-the king of France Charles VIII of France and the son of Pope Alexander VI Cesare Borgia (1495), Alfonso I d'Este (1519), Hugo of Moncada, viceroy of Naples and Sicily (1526).

Throughout the fifteenth century the castle was the subject of alternating conquests by papal, Neapolitan or Colonnese armies: the climax was reached when in the summer of 1501 the French army marching toward Naples, led by Marshal of France Robert Stewart, received orders from Pope Alexander VI to raze the fortifications of Marino, Zagarolo, Artena, Genazzano, Paliano, Subiaco, Cave, Rocca di Papa and other fiefs belonging to the Colonna family, his personal enemies. Another destruction was suffered by the castle in November 1526 on the orders of Pope Clement VII as part of the devastating conflict that ended with the sack of Rome in 1527.

Popular rumor has it that, in the work of rebuilding the baronial residence, the feudal lady Agnese di Montefeltro, a cultured woman who had grown up at the Montefeltro court in Urbino, also consulted the famous architect Donato Bramante, who was engaged at the time in the construction of the basilica of St. Peter in the Vatican in Rome, and that Bramante is credited with the construction of a section of scarp walls in peperino blocks located on the southwest front of the palace. However, it is more likely that these are a surviving section of the ancient circle of walls of the 14th-century Orsini fortress.

Around 1532, with the beginning of a period of relative military tranquility in the Lazio territories, Ascanio I Colonna, Vittoria Colonna's brother, initiated the urban renewal of the fiefdom, according to a conception similar to that which the Farnese family had at the same time in the building renewal of Caprarola, in the province of Viterbo. Thus was conceived the straight line that from the via Castrimeniense -main road connecting with Rome, still today- led directly to the baronial residence under construction, through the gutting of the current via Roma through the upper-medieval district of the Castelletto ward. Outside the walls, the first part of the Colonna Gardens was built, a valuable green area at the time outside the city -today completely replaced by the twentieth-century expansion of the Borgo Garibaldi district-, conceived as a palace garden. The triggering event for this urban renewal was probably the visit to Rome of Emperor Charles V of Habsburg, Ascanio Colonna's father-in-law as the father of his wife Giovanna d'Aragona, from whom he later separated, maintaining conflicting relations.

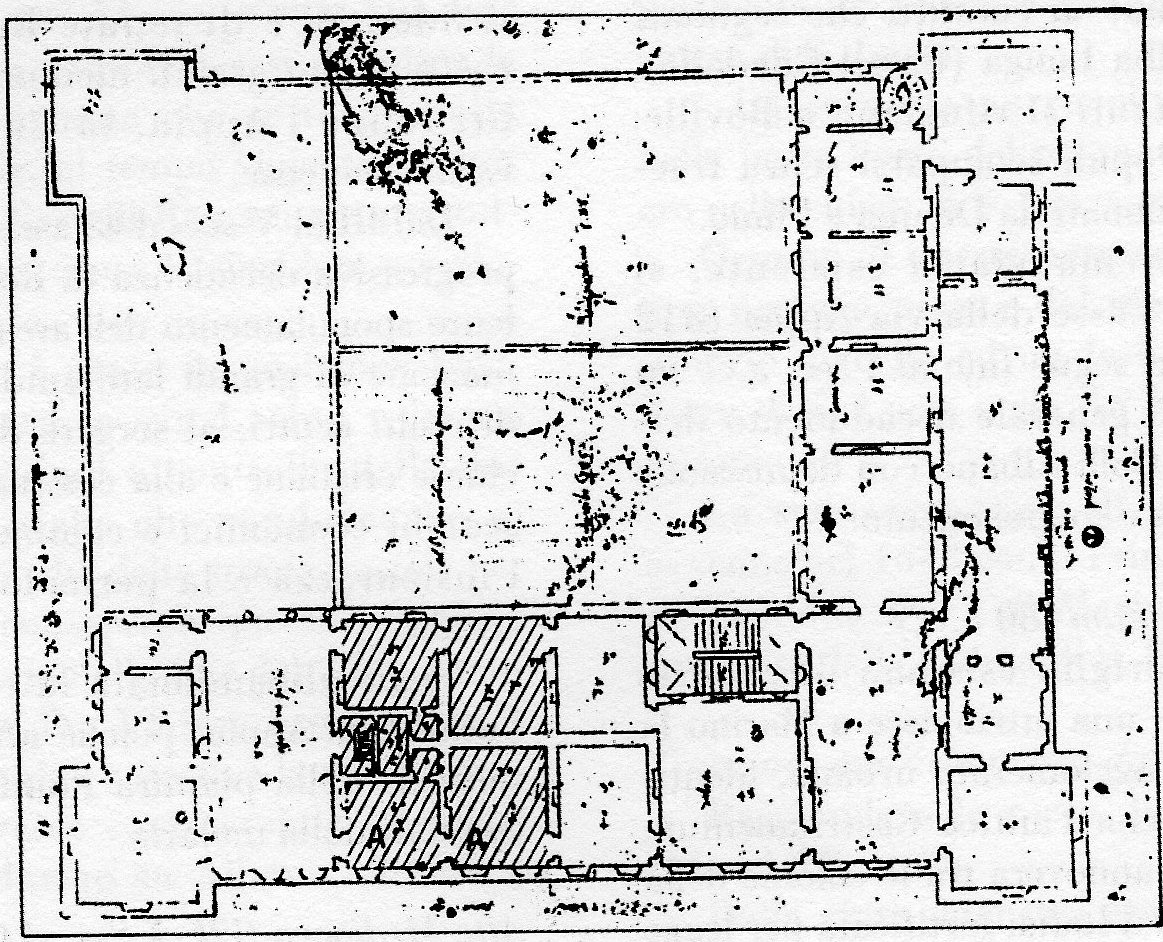
The plan of the palace made by Antonio da Sangallo the Younger preserved in the Cabinet of Drawings and Prints of the Uffizi Gallery in Florence (official dis. no. 697).

The design of the palace was entrusted to Antonio da Sangallo the Younger: it was articulated on a quadrangular plan dominated at the apexes by four towers that were also quadrangular, in essence a fortress -compared to the original function of the pre-existing building, but also reminiscent of the Villa Farnese in Caprarola-. In the following decades, however, the project would be tampered with and eventually remain unfinished.

The difficulties Ascanio encountered under the pontificate of Pope Paul III caused work on the palace complex to be suspended, which was resumed under the rule of Marcantonio II Colonna, famous because he was the admiral of the papal fleet at the Battle of Lepanto in 1571. The period of his lordship over Marino, which lasted from 1554 to 1584, was marked by legal reorganization -in 1564 the seal of the Community appeared for the first time, in 1566 the new Statutes were issued,-as well as the completion of urban reorganization. In 1566, while the new thoroughfare of Via Roma was fully inhabited along its entire length, the palace was only one-quarter completed, and the wide peperino staircase leading from the level of the present Piazza della Repubblica to the atrium level had already been built. After Marcantonio Colonna's departure for Palermo, where he had held the position of viceroy of Sicily since 1577, urbanistic works in the Marino fiefdom were resumed by his successor, Cardinal Ascanio II Colonna, around 1584. Under the rule of the cardinal, who made himself disliked by the population for his authoritarian and despotic attitudes -so much so that in 1599 he stirred up a revolt of the people of Marino, which was violently quelled by the papal government army and the subject of a papal inquiry- the Colonna Gardens complex was enlarged -causing quite a few protests among the people of Marino from whom the communal land used for growing onions was removed, which became the splendid private garden of the Colonna family -which was embellished with statues and fountains and with the frescoed vaults of the Casino, a new area of baronial greenery at the Ferentano woods, the Barco Colonna, was also created, and the part of the palace already laid out was finally completed. The walls of the inner courtyard and the rooms facing the eastern front were put in place.

=== 17th, 18th and 19th centuries ===
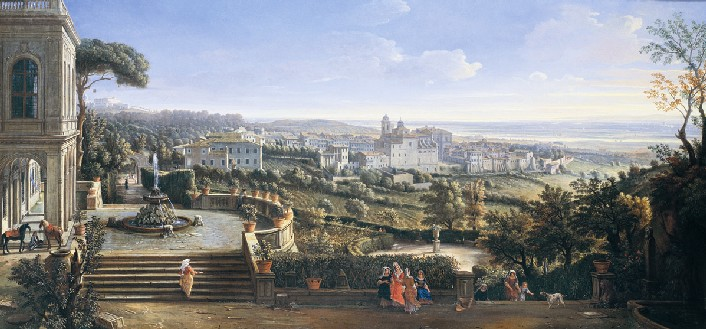
A view of Marino from the villa Colonna di Belpoggio, by Caspar Van Wittel (1719) made on commission from the Colonna family: in the foreground, the basilica of St. Barnabas, and immediately behind, Palazzo Colonna.

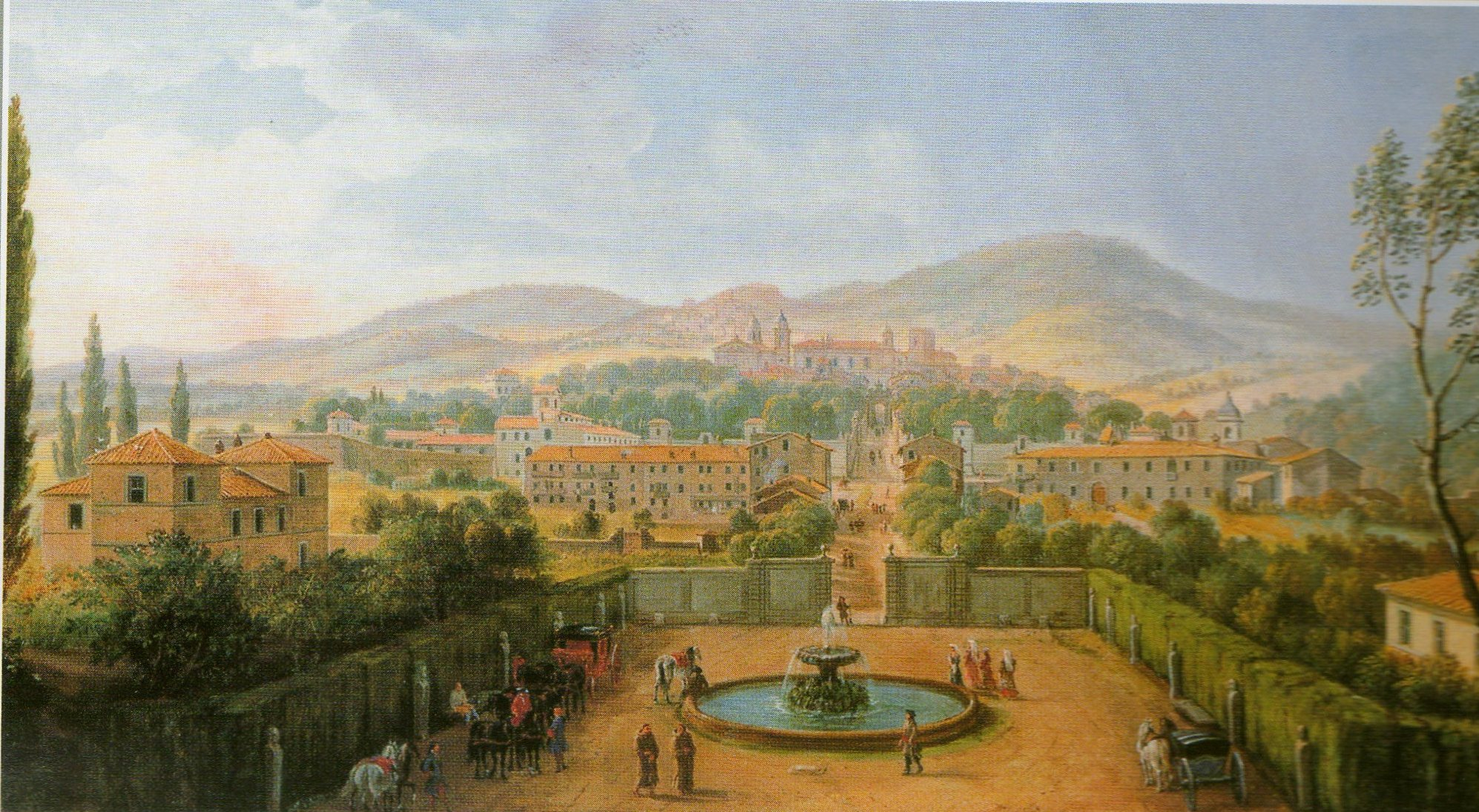
Another view of Marino by Caspar Van Wittel (1719) made on commission from the Colonna family: the terminal section of the Castrimeniense road from the Colonna villa in Bevilacqua is depicted.

In the first half of the seventeenth century, under the rule of Filippo I Colonna and later his son, Cardinal Girolamo Colonna, there was a renewed and impressive building fervor in the fiefdom. The architect Antonio Del Grande, already active at the Palazzo Colonna in Rome and later at the parish church of Santa Maria Assunta in Rocca di Papa, was called to Marino to design the great collegiate basilica of San Barnaba, built between 1640 and 1662 at the end of the new thoroughfare already inaugurated at the end of the sixteenth century and currently called Corso Trieste. The urban center of attraction thus shifted to the axis Piazza San Barnaba - Palazzo Colonna: centrally to this axis, in today's Piazza Lepanto, was in fact placed the monument-symbol of the city, the fountain of the Four Moors, made around 1636 by the sculptor Pompeo Castiglia.

Inside the ducal palace - in fact, since 1606 the fiefdom of Marino had been elevated to the rank of a duchy by Pope Paul V - Filippo I Colonna entrusted the work to the architect Girolamo Rainaldi, who arranged for the quadrangular tower in the center of the inner courtyard, on which the Colonna-Tomacelli coat of arms still stands today; probably at this time the spiral staircase leading from the atrium on the ground floor to the main floor was defined, between 1619 and 1622. On the main floor, a number of paintings attributed to Taddeo Zuccari and his brother Federico Zuccari were collected, forming a valuable but indefinable picture gallery to this day -dispersed not only by the war events of 1944, but also by disposals and removals put in place earlier, such as the transportation of the most valuable works to the residences of Paliano and Genazzano that took place in the mid-nineteenth century-along with oleographs of the Popes with life-size reproduced heads from St. Peter's to follow, preserved until 1915 in the atrium on the ground floor. Other frescoes in the reception rooms were completed around 1635, commissioned by Prince Philip.

Still in the 18th century, some frescoes in the halls on the main floor attributed to Jacopo Alessandro Calvi were made.

The renovated palace hosted several important events and personalities. On October 24, 1627, Pope Urban VIII, the first pontiff to reside at Castel Gandolfo during the summer and autumn holidays, celebrated at the Palace of Castel Gandolfo the marriage of his nephew Taddeo Barberini to Anna Colonna, daughter of Filippo I Colonna and his wife Lucrezia Tomacelli. On the sidelines of the celebration, the bride and groom and many guests were invited by the bride's father to his fiefdom of Marino where the feast continued with displays of great generosity on the part of Filippo Colonna. Pope Benedict XIV was hosted at the palace on June 4, 1741. On December 11, 1812, nine brethren of the archconfraternity of San Giovanni Decollaro arrived in Marino called as spiritual assistants to some condemned prisoners whose sentence was to be carried out shortly thereafter: the nine men asked for hospitality at the palace, and received a magnificent one.

An inventory of the Colonna family's property dated August 1, 1788, shows that about 600 paintings of various types and genres were kept in the Marinese palace.

It is likely that the palace, abandoned by the noble owners, suffered some raids during the events of the Roman Republic (1798-1799). The situation normalized after the interlude of the Napoleonic occupation of the Papal States (1807 - 1814), when Pope Pius VII returned to Rome in May 1814. The subversion of feudalism, already declared by the French in 1807, was confirmed in the territories of "second recovery" -Romagna, Marche and Umbria, which were returned to the pope by the Congress of Vienna only in the summer of 1815- while in Lazio it was effectively discouraged by the motu proprio of July 6, 1816. Thus it was that many feudal lords renounced their centuries-old feudal rule over their fiefs, while retaining all property there. The "baronial places" throughout the Church State were reduced in a few years from 263 to 72. Therefore, Prince Philip III Colonna renounced feudal rule over Marino and most of his larger fiefs that were costly to maintain, since the solution adopted by the motu proprio mentioned above had been precisely to shoulder all expenses of maintenance to the feudal lord.

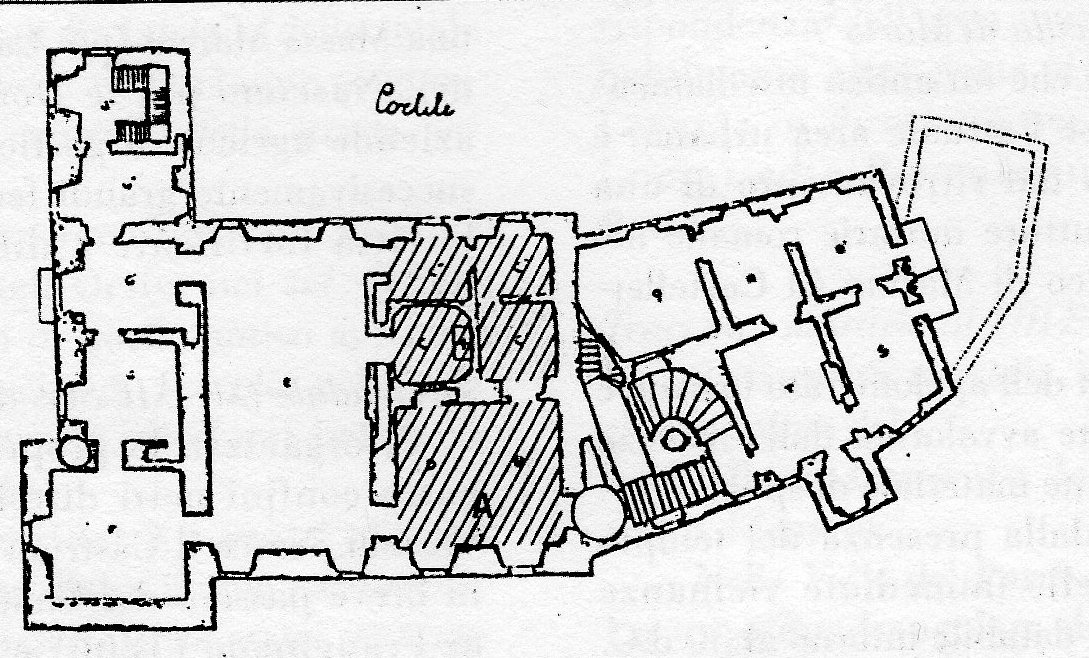
The main floor of the palace in a late 19th-century relief preserved at the State Archives of Rome (I collezione Disegni e Piante, Marino nº 48–52).

However, he remained in possession of all the family residences located in the Marinese territory, including the palace. In the Gregorian Cadastre, a massive work of registration that began in the late 1710s and was completed in the 1930s, the Colonna family's property appears to be the fideicommissary inheritance of Cardinal Agostino Rivarola: this probably occurred upon the death of Prince Philip III (1818) in view of the intricate succession disputes among the prince's three daughters. His successors, namely Prince Aspreno Colonna-Doria-Del Carretto (1787 - 1847), Giovanni Andrea Colonna-Doria-Del Carretto (1820-1894) and Marcantonio Colonna (1844-1912) gradually disposed of this large estate: having sold the Colonna villa in Belpoggio as early as the late eighteenth century, in the 1840s the local bourgeois families of the Colizza, Capri and Batocchi bought the Colonna villa in Bevilacqua, the Colonna orchards near the Sassone locality and the Colonna Gardens, respectively.

Although many valuable works had been moved elsewhere by the Colonna family, and many valuable archaeological finds excavated on site had been sold to the most diverse buyers, the furnishings of the Marinese palace always remained of a certain standard, so much so that the nineteenth-century writer Gaetano Moroni, secretary to Pope Gregory XVI, noted with admiration the value of the furniture. The aforementioned portraits of the popes were used as a model to remake the medallions of the popes in the basilica of St. Paul Outside the Walls in Rome, after the latter's fire in 1835. At the second floor of the palace were also accumulated numerous papers from the Colonna archives in other Lazio centers, such as Paliano, Genazzano and Cave.

=== 20th and 21st centuries ===
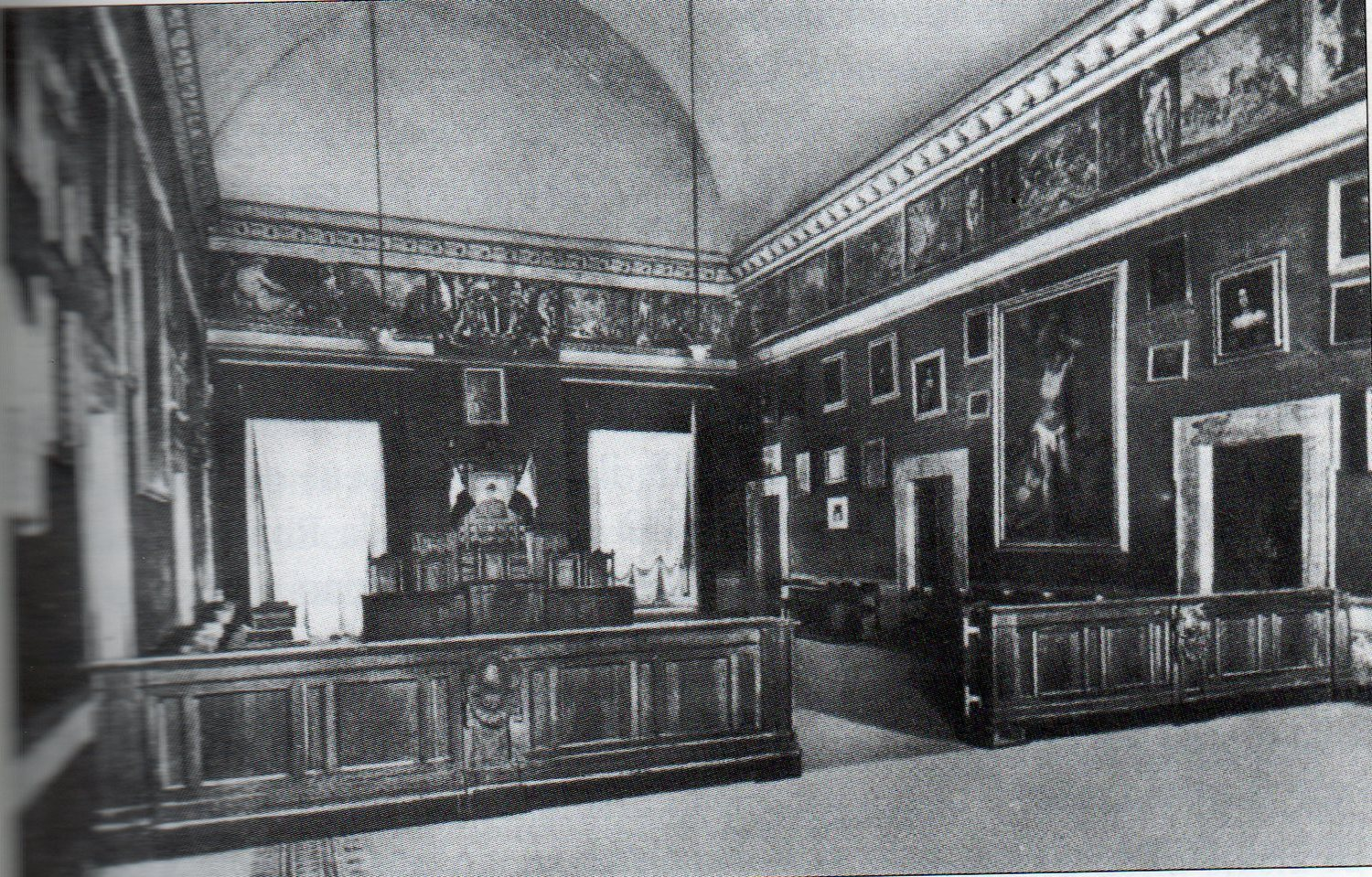
The Throne Room, with the Zuccari brothers' picture gallery, in an early 20th century image

In 1916 Vittoria Colonna Caetani, wife of historian Leone Caetani and heir to the Marino properties of the Colonna family, granted in perpetual emphyteusis to the municipality of Marino the palace and the Barco Colonna, the only properties still privately owned by the Colonna family in their former fiefdom in Marino. At the palace now owned by the municipality, the municipal seat was immediately moved, since 1878 housed in the Palazzo Comunale in what is now Piazza Giacomo Matteotti - today the palace is named after the square in front of it. Along with the municipal seat, the seat of the municipal antiquarium, opened in February 1904, and the seat of the municipal archives, which contained numerous unique documents dating back as far as the 16th century, were moved to Palazzo Colonna.

On the occasion of the sixth Grape Festival (October 5, 1930) - the historic event, the first celebration dedicated to wine in Italy, had been held since 1925 - the first Wine Store of Italy was inaugurated in the premises of the former ducal cellars under the quadrangular tower, a sort of high-level wine stores conceived as means of advertising local wines. The reopening of the premises, soon to be closed due to the above-mentioned war events, was proposed by then Senator Zaccaria Negroni in 1957.

Wednesday, Feb. 2. All is quiet, serene. People are heading home for lunch. In the church, the solemn Candlemas service has just ended. Some women linger quietly in the stores for their daily shopping.

Half past twelve: roar of engines. Alarm. But few make their way to the shelters; most stand by, as usual: so many formations have passed, especially in the last few days! Where will they go to sow death?.... There, one formation has passed. A second one is heard coming; it too will pass like the others. A sudden roar abruptly breaks all illusions. (It was the collapse of Palazzo Colonna, hit by large chain bombs). People rush to the shelters. Too late! A shower of bombs comes over, heralded by ragged hisses. Then another and another. The village is buried in smoke and the dust of rubble: it cannot be seen a meter away. Screams. Groans. Wailing. Rubble.

I give up describing. Those who have lived through those moments know; those who have not lived through them ... cannot understand.

— Zaccaria Negroni

On February 2, 1944, in the midst of World War II, the building was almost entirely destroyed by the first Anglo-American aerial bombardment carried out over the historic center of Marino -previously, only the hamlet of Ciampino had been hit- Despite the fact that the local National Liberation Committee presided over by the future servant of God, mayor of Marino and Christian Democrat senator Zaccaria Negroni, had informed the Allies of the absence of war objectives in the territory of Marino, the raid was probably unleashed with the intention of striking the car park of Villa Colonna di Belpoggio and the base transceiver station of Palazzo Colonna. Irretrievably lost were the numerous paintings of the picture gallery, the precious documents of the archives -some had been transcribed by the scholar Angelo Mercuri, others were found in duplicate at the Colonna archives of Palazzo Colonna in Rome or at the capitular archives of the basilica of St. Barnabas, most are lost forever-, the period furnishings. In the collapse of the eastern facade, the fountain of the Four Moors was buried. The quadrangular courtyard keep and some of the perimeter walls of the northern front, as well as the entire western flank, remained standing.

Under the palace, in the intricate maze of caves originally used as ducal cellars, displaced citizens found refuge throughout the war period. Around the rubble of the palace, after the arrival of the Anglo-American army between June 3 and 4, 1944, the pro tempore municipal administration and many citizen volunteers labored to make the city's fortunes rise again quickly: the moving account of the war and postwar period in Marino was provided by a protagonist of these years, Zaccaria Negroni, in the book Marino sotto le bombe. On December 13, 1944, the temporary headquarters of the municipal middle school and the Paolo Mercuri State Art Institute were inaugurated in the premises of Palazzo Colonna that had survived the bombing.

The municipal seat was again brought to the old Palazzo Comunale until the complete reconstruction of Palazzo Colonna was completed, faithfully respecting the original design so much so that the nineteenth-century reliefs and the present ones almost totally match: the inauguration of the reconstructed building was held on February 2, 1958. Since then the building has not undergone any substantial changes. As early as July 1954, however, the interior spaces of the palace were allocated: in addition to housing the municipal administration, the basement overlooking Lepanto Square would house a "wine store" and the pro loco, while the ground floor overlooking the inner courtyard was destined for the "Paolo Mercuri" state art institute, shortly thereafter officially recognized as a secondary school. Students of the art institute were also entrusted with the creation of peperino busts depicting some personalities linked to Marino: among others Vittoria Colonna and Michelangelo.

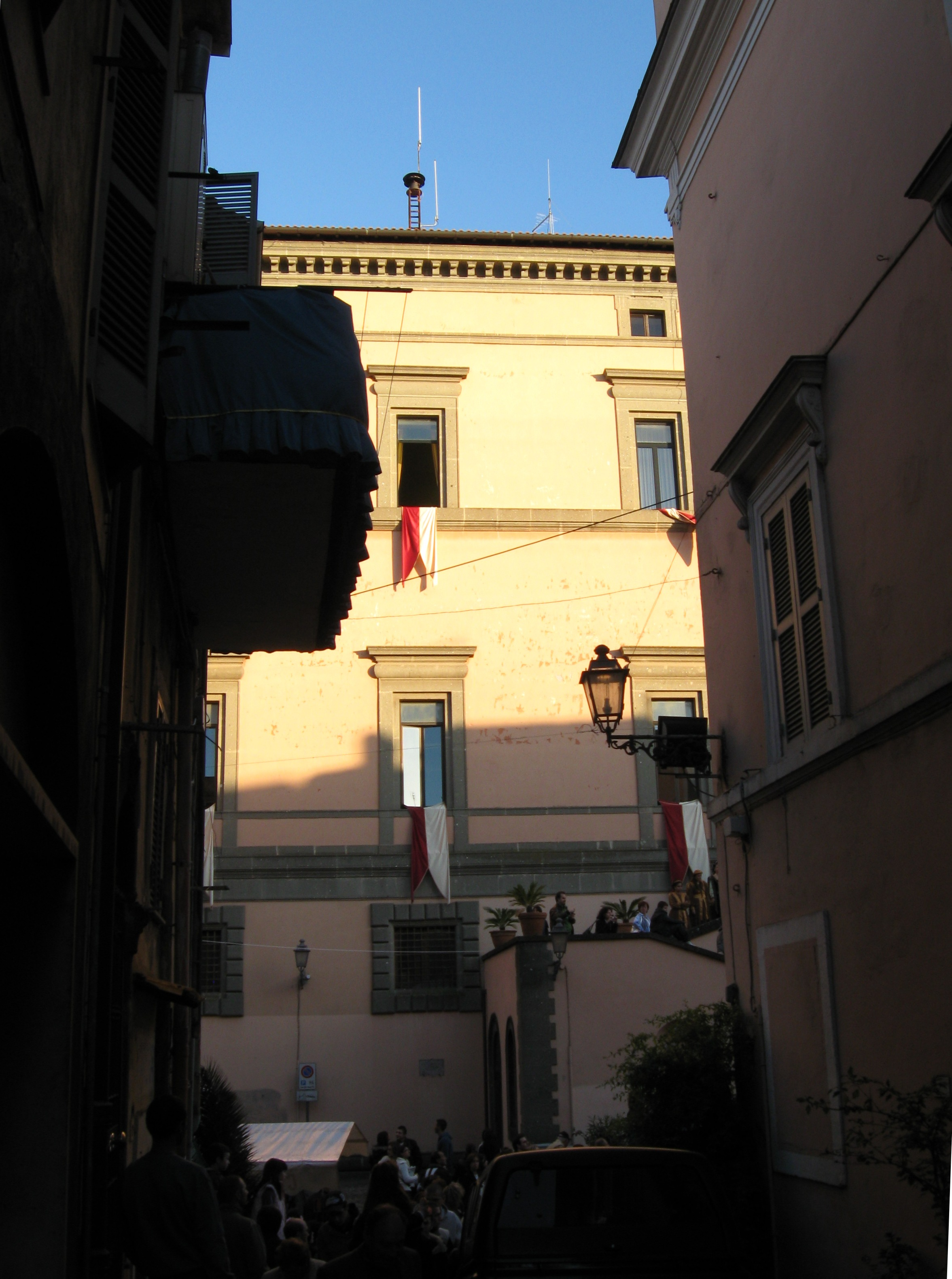
Glimpse of the facade of the building from an alley in the Castelletto district

On June 4, 1964, the municipal coat of arms, which had survived the collapse of the building in 1944, was solemnly relocated on the facade of the palace. The new coat of arms, which still hangs to this day on the facade, was created in 1995 by painter Antonio Nardi.

During the celebrations of the sixty-sixth edition of the Grape Festival in 1983, a bust of the Roman poet of Marinese origin Leone Ciprelli, creator of the festival itself, was placed in the inner courtyard of the building.

In 2001, some work was done to decorate the council chamber, the walls of which were enriched with frescoes by painter Antoine Cesaroni.

Palazzo Colonna has also been the setting for the twinnings signed between the city of Marino and other towns in Europe and North America. In 1989, the council chamber was the scene of the signing of the twinning with the U.S. town of Irving, Texas, the main campus of the University of Dallas, a Catholic university institution that has a branch campus in Marino territory, at the Due Santi locality. On Oct. 2, 2003, as part of the celebrations for the seventy-ninth Grape Festival, a twinning agreement was signed with the Greek town of Lepanto, the scene of the historic Battle of Lepanto in 1571, an event to which Marino's history is particularly linked. On Oct. 4, 2008, still in conjunction with the celebrations for the eighty-fourth Grape Festival, a delegation from the twinned Spanish town of Paterna was received in the council chamber.

On May 22, 2007, an open city council met in Palazzo Colonna to debate the preservation of the San Giuseppe Provincial General Hospital, defined by all political sides and local associations as fundamental for the city. In addition to local administrators, the open city council was attended by the general director of the ASL RMH, Luciano Mingiacchi, health director Vittorio Amedeo Cicogna and the health director of the Marino-Frascati hospital pole, Dr. Michele Di Paolo.

On Dec. 10, 2008, a delegation of Sierra Leonean authorities consisting of Makeni Bishop Monsignor Giorgio Biguzzi, Makeni Mayor Alhaji Andrew Kanu, and Northern Province President as well as Minister of Internal Affairs of the current government was received at Palazzo Colonna. The meeting, which was attended by the newly installed abbot pastor of the Basilica of St. Barnabas Monsignor Pietro Massari, who is in charge of the mission of the suburbicarian diocese of Albano Laziale in the territory of the diocese of Makeni, was followed on Dec. 11 by a mass in the basilica.

== Description ==
=== Exterior ===
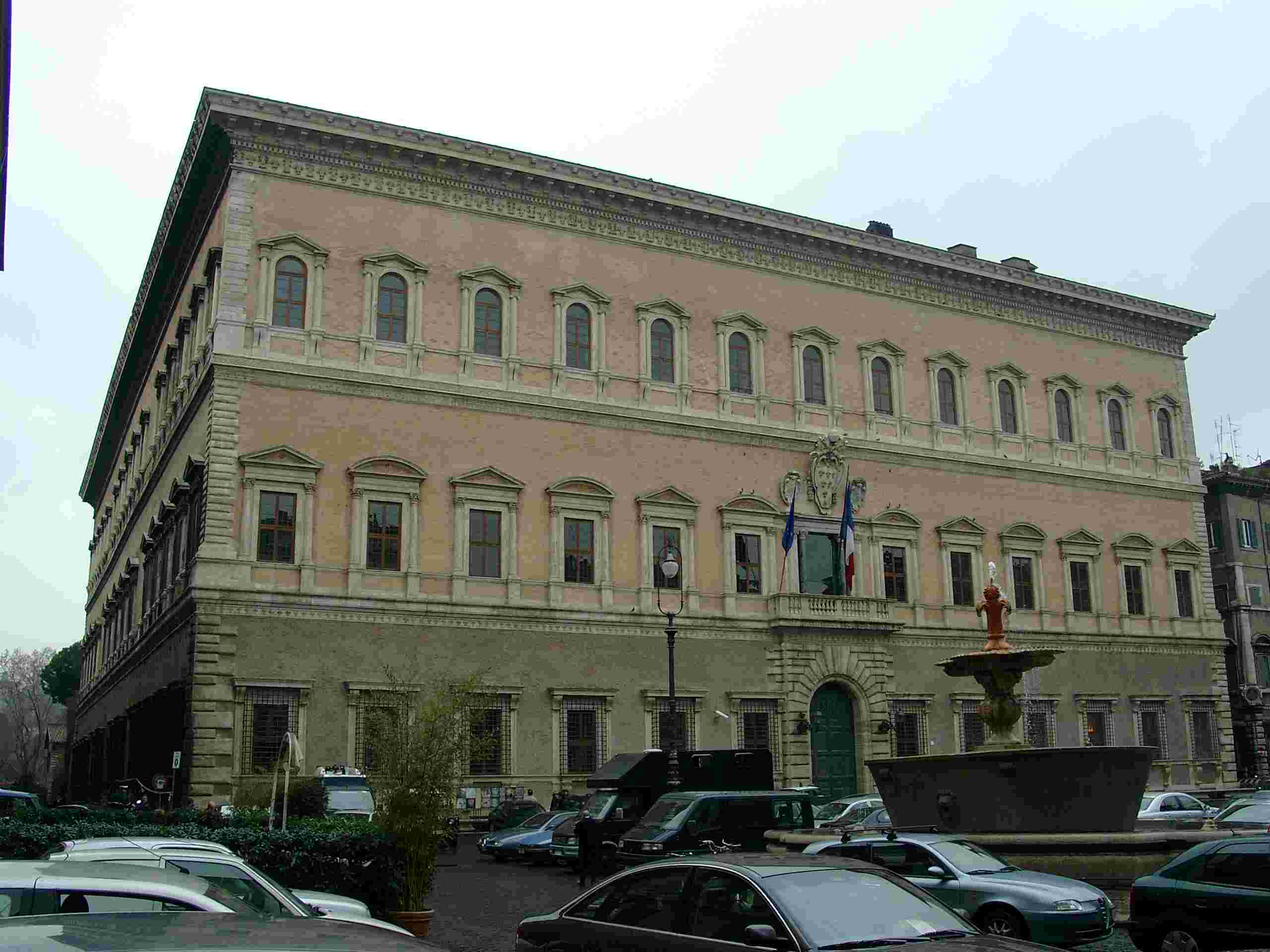
The main facade of Palazzo Farnese in Rome

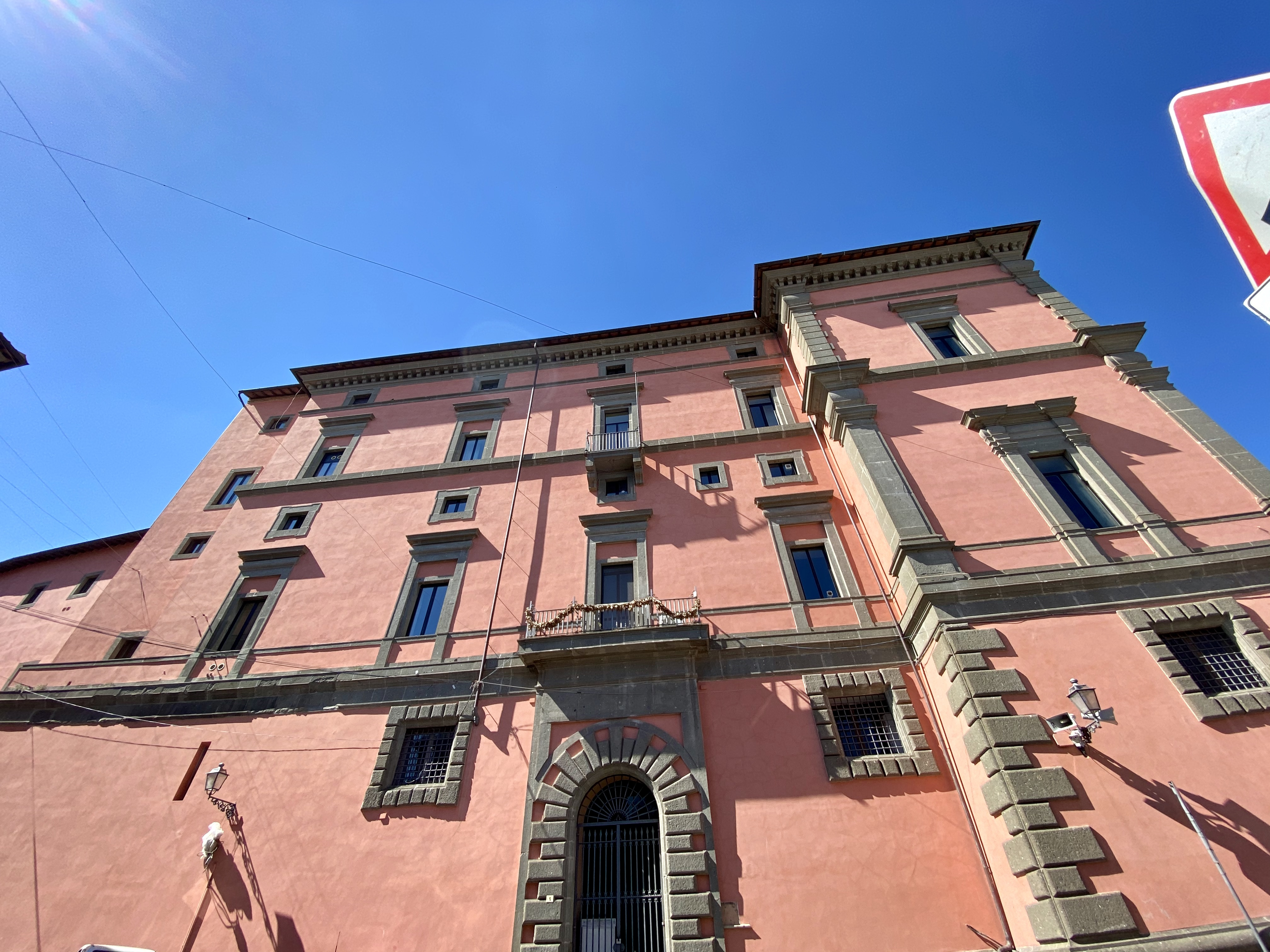
The eastern facade of Palazzo Colonna in Marino (July 2020)

==== The eastern front ====
The eastern front, facing Largo Lepanto, may have been intended to be the main front of the palace, at least in an early plan. It is also conceivable that this front is the one that was to serve as the backdrop to Via Paolo Mercuri. Certainly, it is possible to trace in the style of this front a reference to the facade of Palazzo Farnese in Rome, currently the seat of the French embassy in Italy, designed by Antonio da Sangallo the Younger.

The similarity lies mainly in the ashlar doorway, as well as in the flight of windows, which, however, in Marino do not have the alternating gable. Moreover, the portal of Marino's palace, with ashlars of alternating sizes, is not perfectly centered but off-center to the right.

In front of this facade, until the Anglo-American bombing of February 2, 1944, was located the 17th-century fountain of the Four Moors: it was the collapse of this part of the palace onto the fountain that caused its ruin. In late 2008, it appears that some original peperino parts of the palace were found by digging underground in the square.

Since 1987, the premises of the palace facing Largo Palazzo Colonna have housed the Pro Loco association with its archives and the "Girolamo Torquati" library of local interest. From the premises in question, it is possible to access the palace's cave complex, which houses two exhibition itineraries: "In vita vitis," on the subject of viticulture, and "Memories of War," which collects memorabilia of evacuees in the caves during World War II. A temporary exhibition of nativity scenes is also organized there during the Christmas season.

==== The northern front ====
Its facade with peperino pillars supporting partially bulging pillow-like lintels presents a heavy and melancholic ensemble.

— Giuseppe Tomassetti

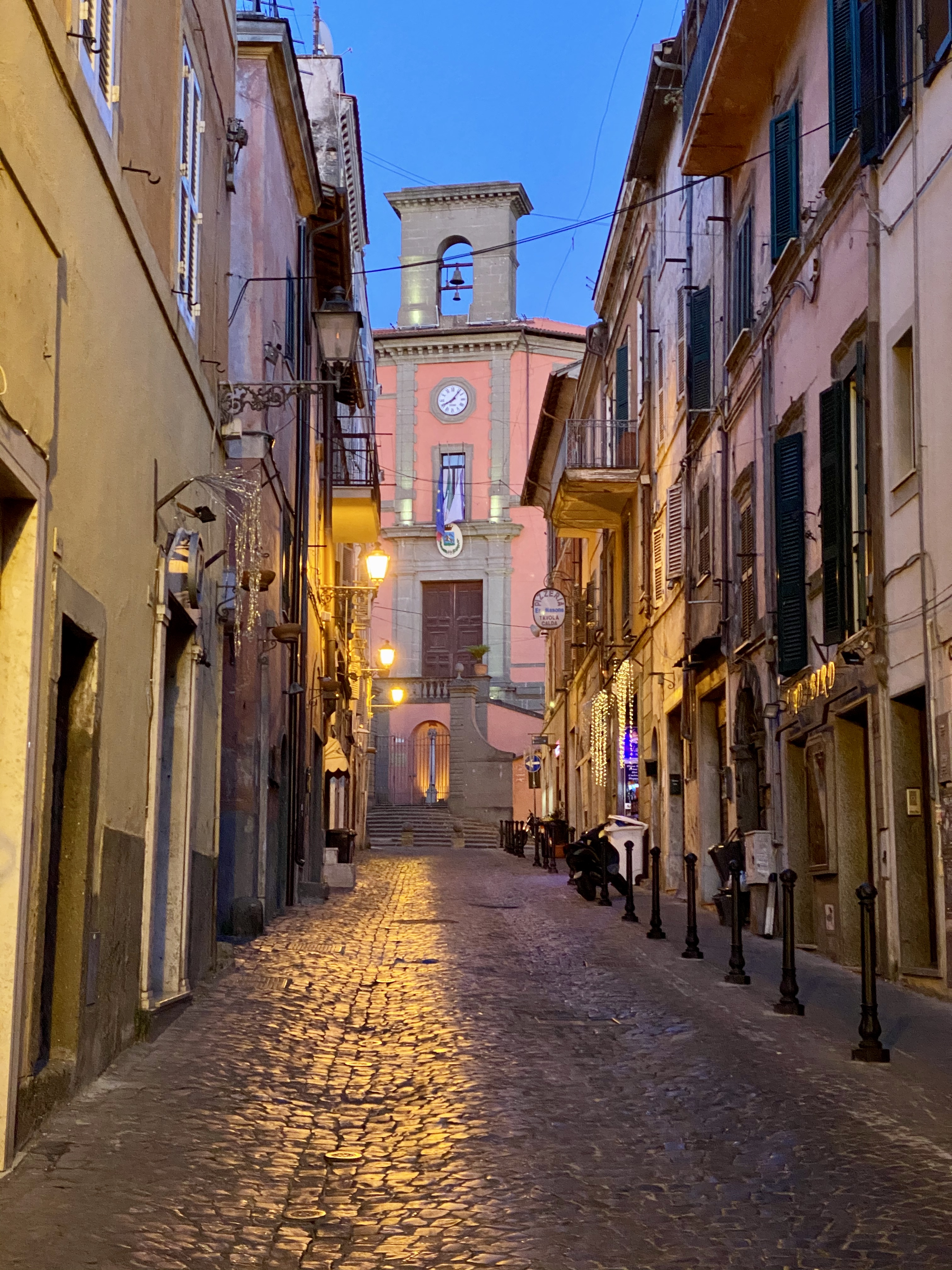
A view of the building from Via Roma, August 2020

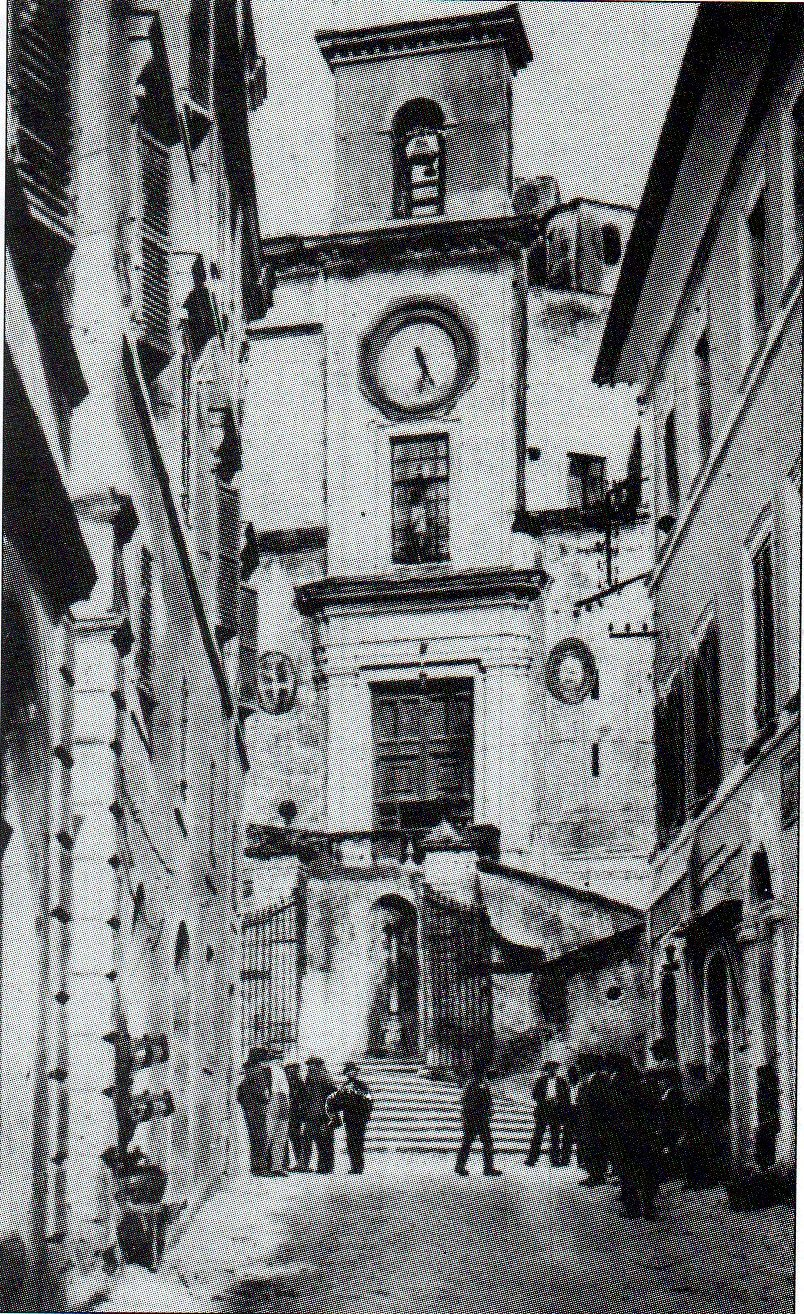
Palazzo Colonna forming the backdrop to the rectilinear road of Via Roma, 1920s.

The northern front, at present the main front of the palace, faces Piazza della Repubblica and is directed toward the 16th-century rectilinear road of Via Roma, the main thoroughfare into the city coming from Rome. Probably, the arrangement of Via Roma -until 1931 still called Strada Nuova- must be linked to the visit of Emperor Charles V of Habsburg to Rome in 1532, and was therefore taken care of by Ascanio I Colonna to be later taken over by Marcantonio II Colonna between 1562 and 1577 and by Cardinal Ascanio Colonna around 1584.

The facade has windows bordered in peperino at regular intervals: the sequence is interrupted by the monumental, off-center portal, which is accessed through a peperino staircase with two arms. Located at the doorway are, in order from bottom to top, the window of the council chamber, a large wall clock, and a bell tower. By 1566, the entrance staircase had already been completed, and the clock with the bell tower equipped with two bells had been built, at a total expense of 211.70 scudi. Above the main door hangs the town coat of arms -representing the banner knight-, in a painting by Antonio Nardi (1995).

In the center of the staircase is a niche, in which is placed a cipollino marble column on an ancient pedestal, a symbol of the Colonna family and now also of the city of Marino. The column, 206 centimeters high with a diameter of 24 centimeters, is a Roman relic, found in an unknown place in the municipal territory: it probably belonged to a modestly sized building dating back to the imperial age. The base of the column, also of Roman age, 20 centimeters high and 44 centimeters wide, is made of fine-grained white marble, but its place of discovery and date are unknown. The pedestal supporting it is a find from an unknown source and difficult to date, made of fine-grained white marble and is 47.5 centimeters wide, 57.5 centimeters high, and 47.5 centimeters deep. On one side is added the modern epigraph MOLE SUA STAT (in Latin, "It stands by its own stature"), a motto of the Colonna family in reference to the column of the noble Roman lineage.

Some rooms located below the entrance staircase have for some years been used as barracks for the municipal police, which previously had its offices on the second floor of the building. On the rampart that connects the northern and eastern fronts, two commemorative plaques hang: one dedicated to the Marino musician Giacomo Carissimi, and the other to the poet Giuseppe Ungaretti, who stayed in Marino for a brief period between the 1920s and 1930s.

==== The western and southern fronts ====
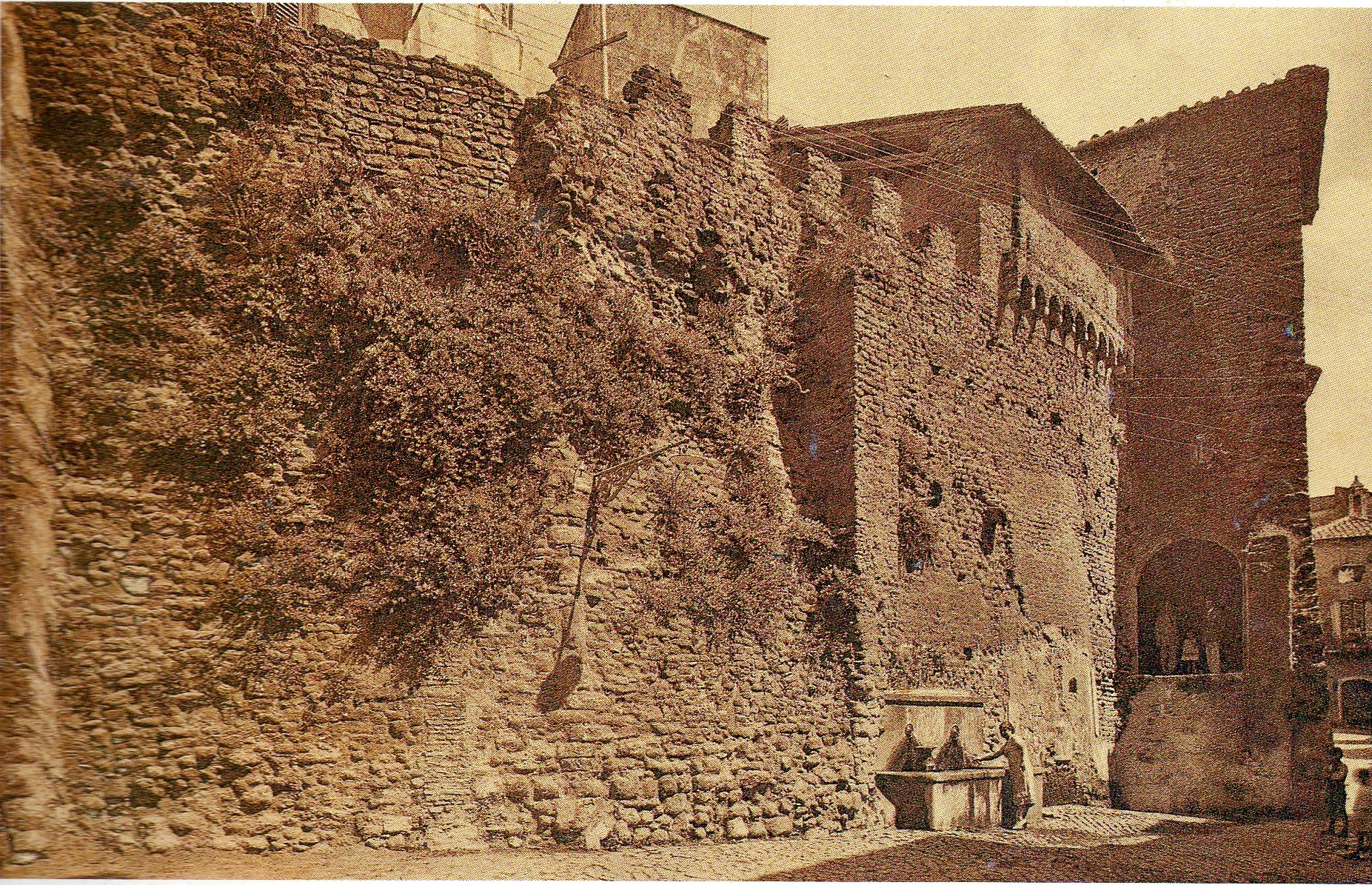
The so-called "Bramante walls" in the 1930s

The western and southern fronts represent the unfinished part of the palace, In fact, probably in Antonio da Sangallo the Younger's original project at least the elevation of the western front was planned, which according to some scholars must have even been the main front. For the western facade, the project included a terraced front open to the southwest, with a view of the valley of the marana delle Pietrare and the peperino quarries. In addition, these two missing sides were to house the stables and servants' quarters, which were not provided for in the portion put in place. In any case, in their present state the two fronts are bounded by largo Luigi Oberdan, via Palazzo Colonna and largo Palazzo Colonna, and house what were to be the servants' quarters and stables, now converted into municipal offices.

On the western side, largo Luigi Oberdan houses the headquarters of the Associazione Nazionale Perseguitati Politici Antifascisti and the Associazione Nazionale Partigiani d'Italia, and the stretch of peperino block walls probably dating back to the original 14th-century fortification of the Orsini fortress, but whose design is attributed by tradition to the hand of architect Donato Bramante, called by Fabrizio I Colonna's wife Agnese di Montefeltro, feudal lord of Marino between 1489 and 1523. Until the 1940s leaning against the walls was a public fountain, called "di Gaudenzio" for unknown reasons: currently the area occupied by the fountain is used as a parking lot. The rest of the western front, in the heart of the Coste district, is occupied by municipal premises, formerly servants' quarters or stables, and today the site of the protocol office and other municipal services.

=== Interior ===
==== The ground floor ====
The ground floor of the palace is located at the same floor level as the inner courtyard, thus about nine meters higher than the floor level in Piazza della Repubblica: this difference in height is bridged by the aforementioned two-armed staircase. The most notable room on the ground floor is the atrium: this vast room originally housed the portraits of the Popes, later placed in the Hall of the Popes on the second floor, and today no longer in existence due to the bombing of February 2, 1944. Giuseppe Tomassetti assures that he saw in the atrium on the ground floor a colossal fireplace.

In its present state, determined by the post-war reconstruction completed in 1958, the atrium is largely occupied by the municipality's information office. There are also two busts depicting Michelangelo Buonarroti and Leonardo da Vinci and the complete list of Marino's mayors. The rest of the floor houses the social services office, the registry office, the elections office -the latter inside the bastion- and other municipal services.

From the main door on Lepanto Square, there is access to a floor below the ground floor of the building, where the Lepanto Hall is located, a vast room used as a venue for conferences, conventions or meetings with citizens. These premises also house the operational headquarters of several city associations.

==== The main floor ====
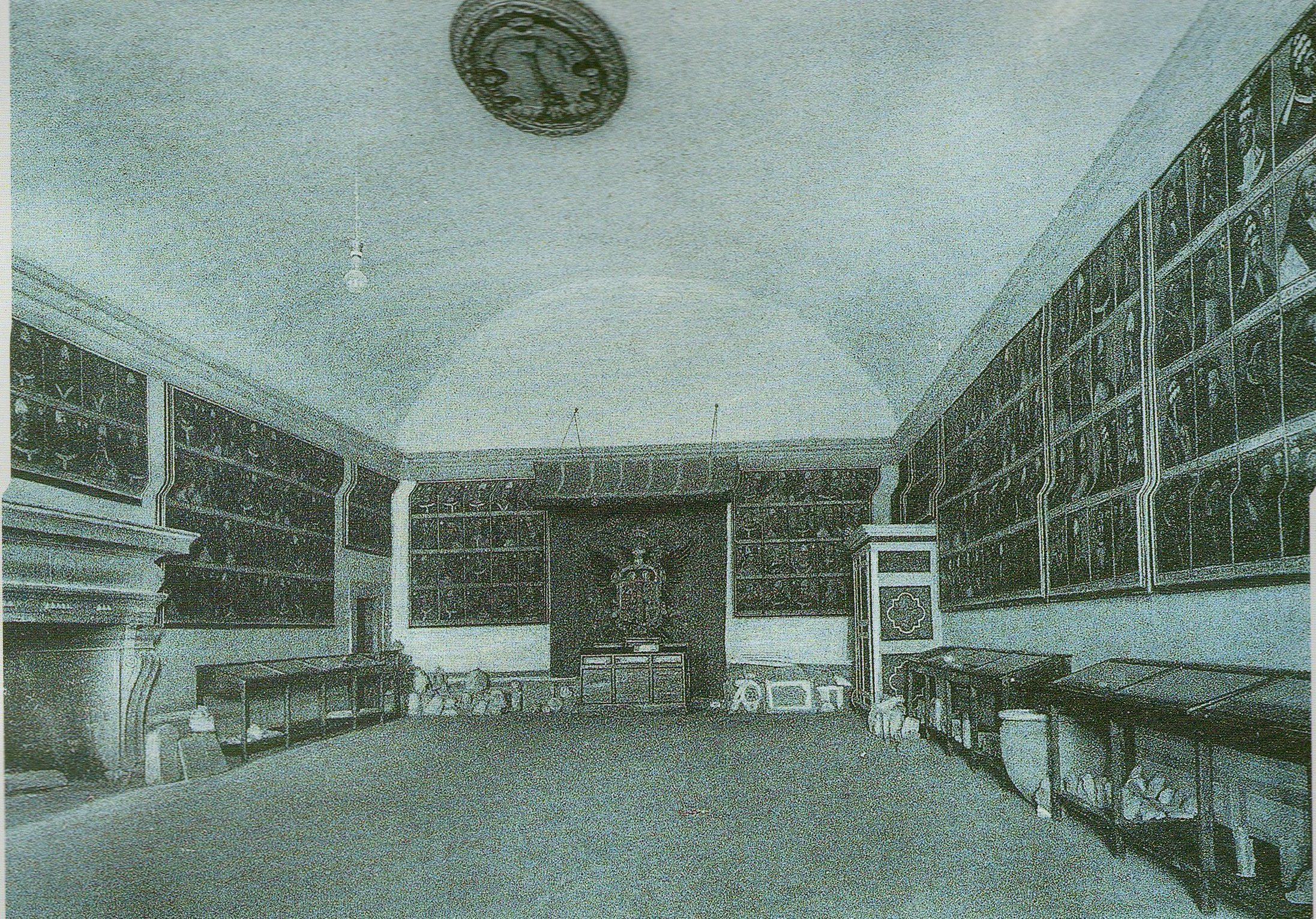
The Hall of the Popes in the 1920s: note the display cases of the municipal antiquarium arranged on either side of the hall.

One ascends to the main floor, or second floor of the palace, via the spiral staircase built by architect Girolamo Rainaldi in the early seventeenth century, and reconstructed quite faithfully in the 1950s. In addition to the numerous municipal offices, the floor houses reception rooms. First in order is the antechamber to the council chamber, a vast square room overlooked by five peperino doors. In the antechamber are placed the busts of Vittoria Colonna and Zaccaria Negroni, and a large painting - 400 x 200 centimeters - by the Marinese painter Stefano Piali, made in 2000 and entitled The Return from the Battle of Lepanto, depicting precisely the return of Marcantonio II Colonna from the Battle of Lepanto in 1571. The council chamber, one of the largest in the Roman Castles, roughly corresponds to the pre-war Throne Room: however, it lacks the decorations that graced the latter. In fact, the great hall described by Giuseppe Tomassetti was adorned with frescoes by Jacopo Alessandro Calvi and a picture gallery of works by Taddeo Zuccari and Federico Zuccari, as well as fine wooden furniture. Another artistically important hall prior to the destruction in 1944 was the Hall of the Popes, into which the portraits of the popes had been transferred, as mentioned above. In all of these halls, originally vaulted with a keel vault, there was the coat of arms of the Colonna family in the center of the ceiling.

The current decoration of the council chamber dates back to 2001, and was done by Genzano-born painter Antoine Cesaroni. The various panels of the frescoes depict different views of the city and its territory, and various personalities associated with Marino.

==== The inner courtyard ====
The squat brown tower that just overlooks the great pile of houses belongs to the Colonna family. Today, a great peace, as though of sleep, breathes over the whole town and it seems that it rests from the bitter events and past hardships.

— Edoardo De Fonseca, I Castelli Romani, Firenze, 1904.

The inner courtyard was established only during Girolamo Rainaldi's interventions in the early 17th century, with the construction of the portico and quadrangular tower. The latter was probably a pre-existing structure to the palace, belonging to the complex of the 14th-century fortress.

Inside the courtyard are several archaeological artifacts that have survived from the old municipal antiquarium, such as a fragment of a relief with peperino trophies dating from the first century B.C., a 1st-century coarse-grained white marble entablature block with an epigraph found in the Pantanelle locality referring to personages of the gens Bellicia, a 3rd-century coarse-grained white marble sarcophagus, a 4th-century entablature block found in the Costa Rotonda locality, and probably referable to a fund owned by Constantine I the Great or his sons, the upper part of an 11th-century ogival mullioned window, probably from the former church of Santa Lucia, which was deconsecrated in the second half of the 17th century and now houses the Umberto Mastroianni Civic Museum. Also, in the 17th century a fine-grained white marble frame probably dating from the 1st century was reused as the frame of a window on the ground floor of the quadrangular tower, on which the coat of arms of Filippo I Colonna and his wife Lucrezia Tomacelli was mounted.

Modern monuments include, in addition to a bust of Leone Ciprelli, a monument commemorating the conference on the commitment of European peoples to détente and peace held at Palazzo Colonna on March 2, 1980, with the participation of municipal authorities and representatives of twinned municipalities.

== See also ==
- Colonna family
- Antonio da Sangallo the Younger
- Marcantonio Colonna
- Filippo I Colonna
- Marino, Lazio

== Bibliography ==
- Tra filo e... storia. Associazione Arte e Costumi Marinesi. 2006.
- Maurizio Canestri, ed. (2006). Marino è città. Marino: Comune di Marino.
- Luigi Devoti (2002). Palazzo Matteotti a Marino (I ed.). Marino: Banca di Roma.
- Ferdinand Gregorovius. Storia della città di Roma nel Medioevo.
- Antonia Lucarelli, ed. (1997). Memorie marinesi (I ed.). Ariccia: Graphing & Printing Ariccia.
- Mara Montagnani (2000). "Il Palazzo Colonna di Marino". Castelli Romani. XL (2): 40–51.
- Zaccaria Negroni. Marino sotto le bombe (III ed.).
- Vittorio Rufo, ed. (1991). Marino - Immagini di una città (I ed.). Marino: Banca di Roma.
- Girolamo Torquati (1987). Studi storico-archeologici sulla città e sul territorio di Marino. Marino: Comune di Marino.
- Giuseppe Tomassetti; Francesco Tomassetti (1910). La campagna romana antica, medioevale e moderna. Vol. I (I ed.). Torino: Loescher.
- Giovanna Cappelli (1989). La raccolta archeologica di Palazzo Colonna a Marino. Marino: Cassa Rurale ed Artigiana San Barnaba di Marino.
- Ugo Onorati (2004). La Sagra dell'Uva di Marino. Marino: Comune di Marino.
