= Lex Voconia =

Ancient Roman law

Lex Voconia (The Voconian Law) was a law established in ancient Rome in 169 BC.

Introduced by Quintus Voconius Saxa with support from Cato the Elder, Voconius being tribune of the people in that year, this law prohibited those who owned property valued at 100,000 asses (or perhaps sesterces) from making a woman their heir. This particular limit was not arbitrary but was apparently the traditional property qualification for admission to the highest class in the Comitia Centuriata, and thus the minimum qualification for the Equestrian Order. In addition, it prohibited extraordinary legacies in a will of a greater value than the inheritance of the ordinary heirs. This intention of this legislation according to Gellius was sumptuary in that it limited the wealth available to women, who were presumed to expend it on useless luxury goods. The law only applied to inheritances by testament and did not affect the intestate law of succession of women, although later this was limited to inheriting to the third degree.

The Lex Voconia was evaded by means of avoiding registration in the census -- as in the case of Publius Annius Asellus -- which entailed the loss of some civil rights, or by the common Roman form of trust known as a fideicommissum. The second provision was essentially voided by the Lex Falcidia. Legislation under Augustus, in particular the Lex Papia Poppaea relaxed the first provision as well, granting full inheritance rights to married women who were mothers of three children (if born free) or of four children (if a freedwoman).

== Relevant articles ==
- Roman Law
- List of Roman laws
