= Battista Sforza =

Duchess of Urbino

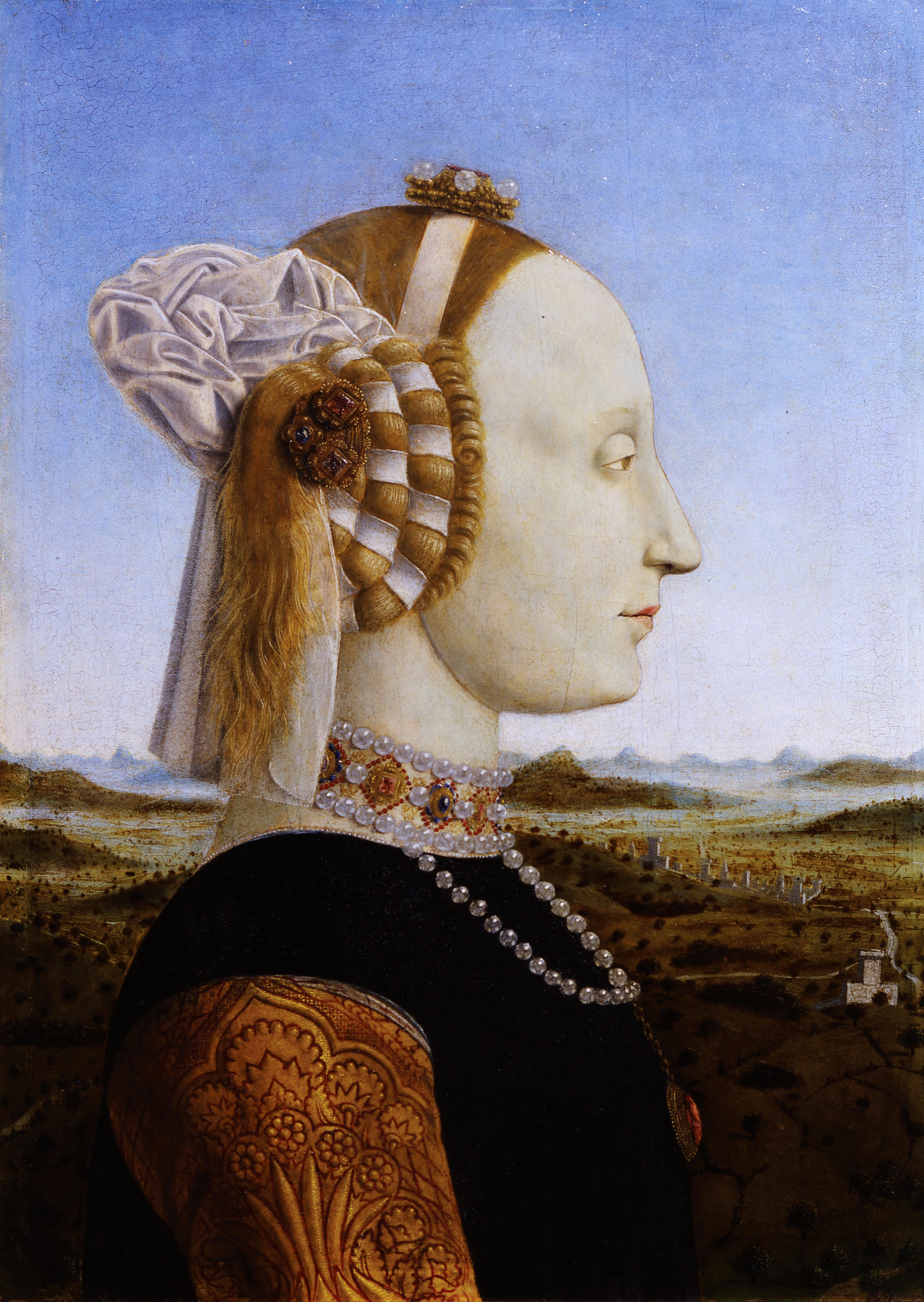
- Detail from the Diptych of Federico da Montefeltro and Battista Sforza by Piero della Francesca, c. 1472–73
- Born: 1446; Pesaro, Duchy of Urbino
- Died: 6 or 7 July 1472 (aged 25–26); Gubbio, Duchy of Urbino
- Noble family: Sforza
- Spouse: Federico da Montefeltro (m. 1460)
- Issue: Costanza (?) di Montefeltro (December 1460 – February 1461); Giovanna di Montefeltro (1462–1514); Isabetta di Montefeltro (c. 1464 – 1521); Costanza di Montefeltro (1466–1518); Violanta di Montefeltro; Agnese di Montefeltro (1470–1522); Guidobaldo da Montefeltro (1472–1508)
- Father: Alessandro Sforza, Lord of Pesaro
- Mother: Costanza da Varano

Battista Sforza (1446 – 6 or 7 July 1472) was the Duchess of Urbino in 1460-1472 as the second wife of Federico da Montefeltro. She acted as regent during her husband's absences from Urbino.

== Biography ==
Battista was the first legitimate child born to Alessandro Sforza, lord of Pesaro, and Costanza da Varano (1428–1447), the eldest daughter of Piergentile Varano (d. 1433), Lord of Camerino, and Elisabetta Malatesta. In 1447, Costanza died after giving birth to her second child, a son called Costanzo (d. 1483), when Battista was 18 months old. After the death of their mother Battista and Costanzo, together with their illegitimate half-sisters Ginevra (1440–1507) and Antonia (1445–1500), moved to the court of their paternal uncle Francesco Sforza and his wife Bianca Maria Visconti where they were brought up alongside their cousins.

Battista and her cousin Ippolita Maria received a humanist education and the former was fluent in Greek and Latin, giving her first Latin public speech at the age of four. She was said to be very skilled in Latin rhetoric and even gave an oration before Pope Pius II. The poet Giovanni Santi described Battista as "a maiden with every grace and virtue rare endowed".

Her uncle Francesco Sforza arranged for her marriage to Federico da Montefeltro, Duke of Urbino, who was 24 years older than she was. The wedding took place on 8 February 1460, when Battista was 14 years old. Their marriage was a happy one and they were described by a contemporary, Baldi, as "two souls in one body". Federico called Battista "the delight of both my public and my private hours." Moreover, he spoke with her about political issues and she accompanied him to almost all official events outside of Urbino. She acted as regent during her husband's absences from Urbino.

Carrying on the Sforza family's tradition of humanist education for women, she educated her daughters similarly to the education she had received from her aunt Bianca Maria. Similarly, Battista's granddaughter Vittoria Colonna, daughter of Agnese, was a famous poet.

After giving birth to six daughters, Battista gave birth to their first son and heir Guidobaldo da Montefeltro on 24 January 1472. However, three months after the birth of their son, Battista, having never fully recovered from her last pregnancy and labour, fell ill and died in July 1472.

== See also ==
- Diptych of Federico da Montefeltro and Battista Sforza
