= Diptych of Federico da Montefeltro and Battista Sforza =

Double portrait by Piero della Francesca

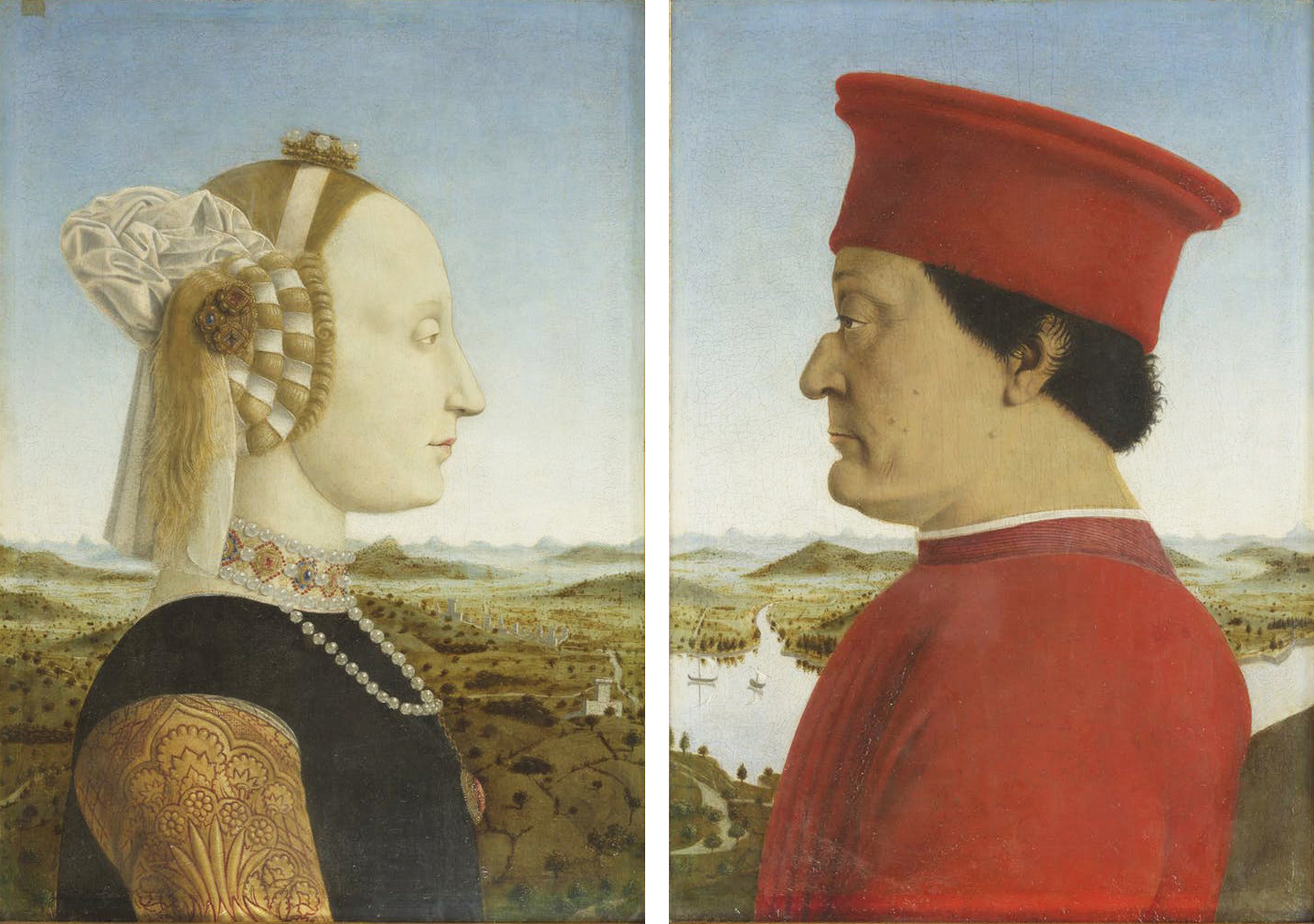
- Artist: Piero della Francesca
- Year: circa 1473–1475
- Medium: Oil on wood
- Dimensions: 47 cm × 33 cm (19 in × 13 in); each panel
- Location: Uffizi Gallery, Florence

The Diptych of Federico da Montefeltro and Battista Sforza are two oil paintings by Italian artist Piero della Francesca, dated to 1473–1475. This famed double portrait is often mistitled The Duke and Duchess of Urbino—as it appears on the website of the Uffizi Gallery, which owns it. Since Battista Sforza died in 1472 and Federico da Montefeltro was not made duke until 1474, Battista never attained the title of duchess.

== Genesis of the work ==
The Uffizi describes the work as follows:

One of the most celebrated portraits of the Italian Renaissance, the diptych features the Duke of Urbino Federico da Montefeltro (1422–1482) and his wife Battista Sforza (1446–1472). In the tradition of the fourteenth century, inspired by the design of ancient coins, the two figures are shown in profile, an angle that ensured a good likeness and a faithful representation of facial details without allowing their sentiments to show through: indeed, the Duke and Duchess [sic] of Urbino appear unaffected by turmoil and emotions. The couple are facing each other and the spatial element is suggested by the light and the continuity of the rolling landscape in the background, representing the area of the Marches over which [they] ruled. Piero della Francesca painted the landscape background in a way that depicts the couple as landowners and rulers of the Urbino region. Their posture and the profile view appears to heighten their status and aloofness, as they face each other they can appear to be watching from above. The chromatic contrast between the bronze skin tones used for Federico and the pale tones of Battista Sforza is striking; [her] pale pallor . . . not only respects the aesthetic conventions which were fashionable during the Renaissance but could also allude to her untimely death in 1472. On the back of the panels, the [couple] are featured being carried triumphantly on ancient wagons, accompanied by the Christian virtues; the Latin inscriptions pay tribute to the couple's moral values. The presence of the images on the reverse side suggests that the two paintings, now set in a modern frame, would once have been part of a diptych.

One of ... Piero della Francesca's most famous works, the double portrait is representative of the relationship between the painter and the [rulers] of Montefeltro; Piero was a frequent guest at their court, ... which would soon become one of the most important cultural and artistic hearts of Italy. The master painter marries the strict approach to perspective learned during his Florentine education with the lenticular representation more characteristic of Flemish painting, achieving extraordinary results and unmatched originality.

It has generally been assumed that this work was commissioned by Federico. Piero biographer James R. Banker shares that view and states that he is "confident that Piero painted [the diptych] soon after Battista's death." The assumption that Federico commissioned the work has been questioned by one scholar, however. In an article based on her M.A. thesis on the work, Michelle Marder Kamhi agrees that the work was probably created soon after Battista's untimely death, but argues that the inscriptions' emphasis on her husband's deeds and virtues would have been inconsistent with his profound grief at her loss. She suggests instead that the diptych was commissioned by someone else (perhaps Lorenzo de' Medici) as a gift both to honor him for his triumphant military campaign at Volterra in 1472 and to console him for the loss of his beloved young wife, who had become ill in his absence and died soon after his return.

== The allegorical triumphs ==
The allegorical scenes on the back of the portraits are unique, and their meaning is enhanced by Latin inscriptions on the simulated architectural base below them. Their iconography is based on a complex tradition dating back to the Roman triumph, which was further enriched by a series of allegorical poems by the 14th-century Italian poet Francesco Petrarca (Petrarch). The Roman triumphs celebrated military victories, but Petrarch's triumphs were allegories of love, chastity, death, fame, time, and eternity.

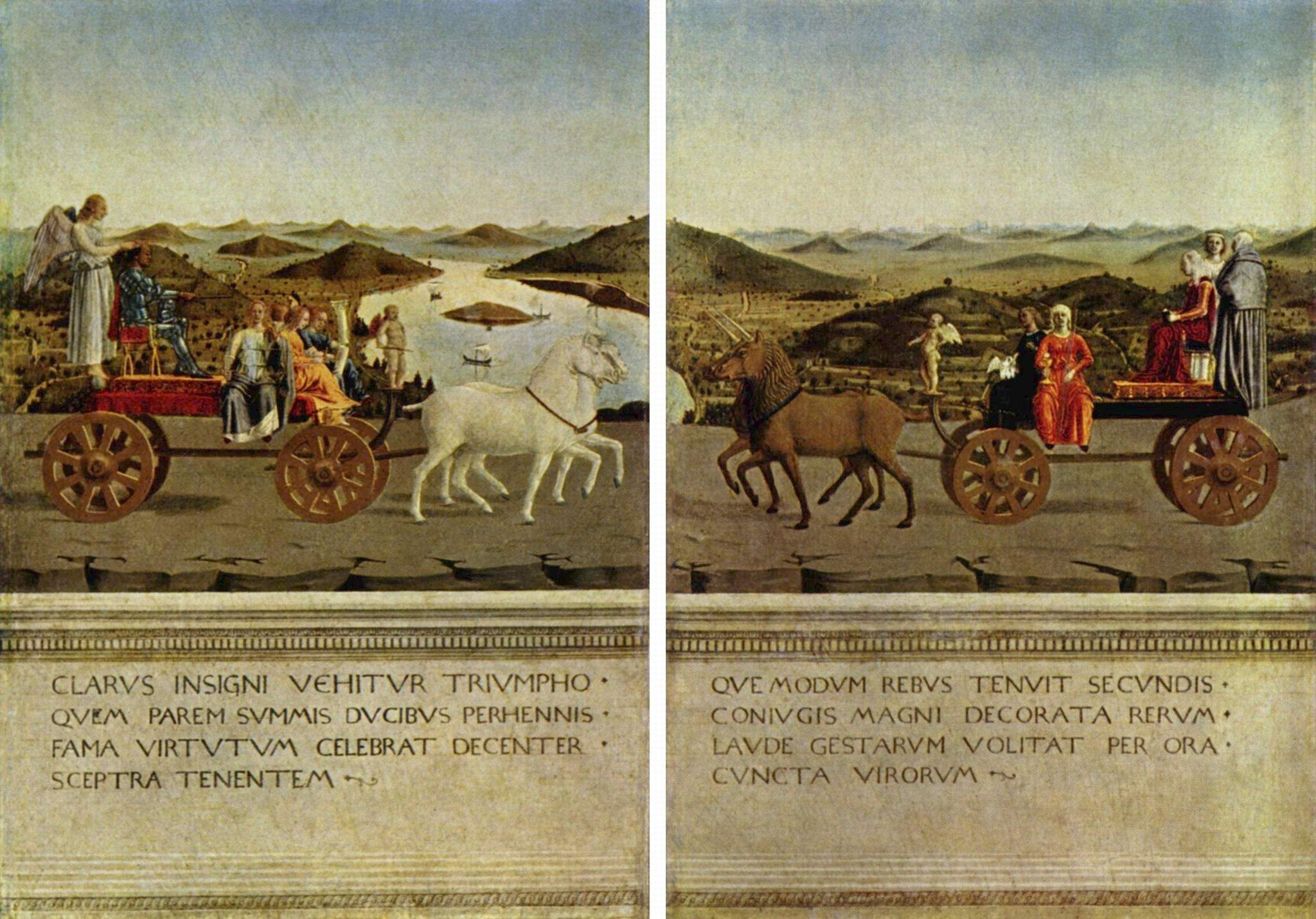
Scenes of allegorical triumphs on the back of the double portrait of Battista Sforza and Federico Montefeltro.

Federico's triumphal car is drawn by a team of white horses, as was traditional for victorious commanders in antiquity. He is accompanied by allegorical figures of the four Cardinal virtues—prudence, justice, fortitude, and temperance—the attributes of a good leader. His inscription can be translated as follows:

The famous one is drawn in glorious triumph Whom, equal to the supreme age-old captains, The fame of his excellence fitly celebrates, As he holds his scepter.

Federico was indeed a victorious commander famed for his excellence. As one of the greatest condottieri of the Italian Renaissance, he was honored with a live triumph by the city of Florence in the summer of 1472 to celebrate his defeat of Volterra on behalf of the Medici rulers of Florence. Piero's painting may well allude to that event.

Battista's triumphal car is drawn by unicorns, symbolic of chastity, and carries the three theological virtues—faith, hope, and charity (love). A translation of her inscription reads:

She who retained modesty in good fortune
Now flies through all the mouths of men
Adorned with the praise of her great husband's deeds.
