= Fabrizio Colonna =

Italian condottiero (1450–1520)

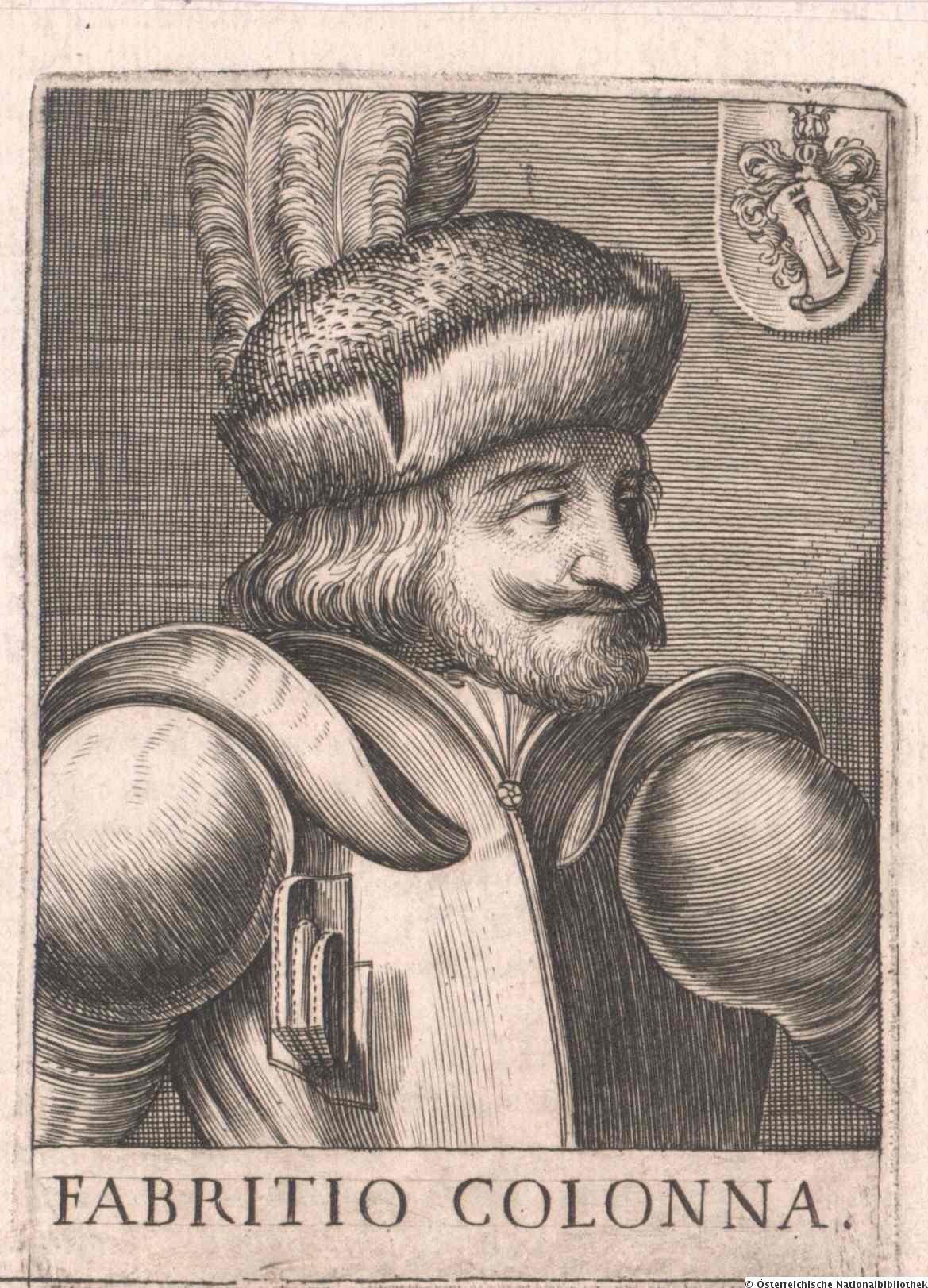
Fabrizio Colonna

Fabrizio Colonna (c. 1450 – 18 March 1520) was an Italian condottiero, a member of the powerful Colonna family. He was the son of Edoardo Colonna and Filippa Conti.

Fabrizio was born sometime before 1452. He was married to Agnese di Montefeltro daughter of Federico da Montefeltro, 1st Duke of Urbino, and Battista Sforza.

Fabrizio was known as count of Tagliacozzo and grand constable of the Kingdom of Naples.

During the Italian War of 1499–1504, he played a notable part in the Battle of Cerignola in 1503.

He was a general in the Holy League that fought against Louis XII of France from 1509 to 1515, and at the Battle of Ravenna, he commanded the army of the Papal States against France.

His daughter was Vittoria Colonna, who was an Italian poet, and a close friend of Michelangelo. His son Ascanio Colonna (1500–1557) was 2nd Duke of Paliano and father of Marcantonio Colonna (1535-1584). His nephew Marcantonio was also a successful general.

Fabrizio is the main speaker in Machiavelli's The Art of War and is referenced throughout the book as an authority on both classical and current military structure, strategy, and tactics.

== See also ==
- Vittoria Colonna
- Prospero Colonna
- Marcantonio Colonna
- Colonna family
