= Fideicommissum =

Legal institution of ancient Rome

A fideicommissum is a type of bequest in which the beneficiary is encumbered to convey parts of the decedent's estate to someone else. For example, if a father leaves the family house to his firstborn, on condition that they will bequeath it to their first child. It was one of the most popular legal institutions in ancient Roman law for several centuries. It functioned thus: the testator nominated an heir to act as fiduciarius, entrusted with devising the inheritance to a beneficiary denominated the "fideicommisarius". The word is a conjunction of the Latin words fidei ("to/for trust"), dative singular of fides ("trust") and commissum ("left"), nominative neuter singular perfect past participle of committo ("to leave, bequeath, commit"), it thus denotes that something is committed to one's trust.

The institution was first mentioned in 200 BC by Terence in Andria, 290–98: "tuae mando fide". Caesar Augustus first decreed requirements for the fideicommissum.

== Purpose and enforceability ==
The fideicommissum enabled the heres to be left with the desire of the testator to devise his estate to the proscripti, and the heres would execute the transfer to them.

Institutes, 2.23.1 indicates that Augustus instituted the fideicommissum as legally binding by favouring it in individual cases. Thus its acceptance was directly based on Emperor's Acts, but even previous to this the fideicommissum was always enforceable. The true reason for it lies in the nature of the institution itself. Personal security in Rome was much more important than it is today, primarily because the Romans more greatly valued the duties of friendship. Therefore, certain legal institutions were simply premised on bona fides, e.g. the tutela, societas, and depositum, which did not decrease but rather reinforced their security. Breach of a fiduciary agreement led inevitably to being infamis, which meant lifetime incapacity of making any commercial actions. This threat was sufficient force to guarantee that the fiduciaries would satisfy their obligations. Being a matter of honores, consideration was not required.

== Applicability ==
The great success of the fideicommissum as a clever fraus legi fracta is proved by reference to its long use; redefined by Justinian I, it may have by his reign existed for 700 years. The reasons lie in the great variety of cases it could resolve and the absence of formal requirements to satisfy.

The practical informality and flexibility of fideicommissum is described in Institutes, 2.23.2. There was no need for a certain formula, any word describing the beneficiaries, such as rogo, peto, or volo, employed with the term "fidei tuae committo" sufficiently instituted a fideicommissum. It could be constituted in a will or in a codicil, made orally or even declared by mere gestures. Most attractive of all, it could be added or revoked or varied after the institutio heredes itself. Taking all these advantages in account, it is not surprising that the legatus, with its strict formal requirements, was far less popular. In later eras, a gradual assimilation of legates and fideicommissa took place; under Justinian, the two institutions were fused, in an example of the vulgarisation of Roman Law after its classic era.

=== Restricted capacitas ===
Most important, the fideicommissum enabled transferring property by will to those excluded from inheriting. The lex Voconia in 169 BC for example did not allow women to be appointed as an heir of Romans listed as wealthy by the censor. Later, Augustus enforced his leges Julia by introducing harsh leges caducariae, which punished the unmarried and the childless by denying their capacitas, the privilege of inheriting (the Lex Julia de Maritandis Ordinibus was passed in 18 BC and the lex Papia Poppeia in 9 AD (Inst. 1.145)). But the fideicommissum enabled a prosperous pater familias to appoint his amicus as an heir, who would then be trusted with transferring the inherited property to the unmarried filia. This would ensure her being provided for after his death.

=== Settlements ===
Holding property within a family was of great importance for several reasons. Practically, it ensured the survival of the familia, its name and wealth. Furthermore, it was demanded by the sacral necessity of worshipping the penates, who would cease to exist if the family did. Most important though, the Roman aristocracy relied on a careful and necessary balance of property, to ensure a balance of power. This could be guaranteed by installing a fideicommissum. It was able to regulate the succession of several generations by will and hence incorporates the Roman root of family settlements. Unlike legates, which only allowed passing estate on to a heres, and usufructus, which required a determinate person, the fideicommissum could be granted to incertae personae. Using a fideicommissary substitution (making one fideicommissum subject to another, enabling the preservation of property within a family for generations through successive trusts) the grantor could therefore direct his filius to transfer the estate on to his son at death and so on in perpetuity.

=== Legacies ===
Legates are by nature very similar to the fideicommissum, but the latter did not suffer from the same restrictions. Legates could only be charged on a heres, and the lex Falcidia in 41 BC constrained the legacy to three quarters of the entire inheritance. This of course did not apply for the fideicommissum and with such could be evaded.

=== Freeing slaves ===
Another existing use of the fideicommissum is described in G 2.263-266: libertas quoque servo per fideicommissum dari potest if the heres or legatarius is requested to perform the manumissio to become the patronus of the slave so freed. Freeing slaves was attractive for the dominus for several reasons. Firstly, he could get rid of slaves who were of no use to him (because they were thugs, uneducated or incapable of working). Secondly, a freed slave owed the dominus who freed him honor et sequi, including the procession to the grave. This led to a great number of slaves being freed on the death bed. Rome was gradually crowding with freed slaves, enlarging the poor classes within society. Therefore, Augustus passed laws against luxury. They restricted liberation of slaves, but could be partly evaded by the fideicommissum. The fideicommissum also gave way to granting the rights of a patronus to the person who was committed to freeing the slave.

== See also ==
- Inheritance law in ancient Rome
- Fee tail

== Literature ==
- Avenarius, Martin. The Pre-Classical fidei committere and the Order to be Established Upon Death. Emotion as the Basis of the Legal Bindingness of the Decedent's Last Wishes. In: Writing Order and Emotion. Affect and the Structures of Power in Greek and Latin Authors. Edited by Anja Bettenworth and Jürgen Hammerstaedt. Hildesheim et al.: Georg Olms Verlag, 2020, p. 65-91.
- Borkowski, Andrew, and Paul du Plessis. Textbook on Roman Law, 3rd ed. Oxford: Oxford University Press, 2005.
- Buckland, William Warwick. The Main Institutions of Roman Private Law. Cambridge: Cambridge University Press, 1931.
- Curzon, L. B. Roman Law. London: Macdonald & Evans Ltd., 1966.
- Der Neue Pauly. Edited by Hubert Cancik and Helmuth Schneider. Stuttgart et al.: J.B. Metzler Verlag, Vol. 2: 1997; Vol. 4: 1998; Vol. 7: 1999.
- Kaser, Max. Roman Private Law, 2nd ed. Translation by Rolf Dannenbring of Romisches Privatrecht, 6th ed. London: Butterworths, 1968.
- Watson, Alan. Roman Private Law around 200 BC. Edinburgh: Edinburgh University Press, 1971.
