= Falcidia gens =

The gens Falcidia was a plebeian family at Rome. It is known chiefly from two individuals, Gaius Falcidius and Publius Falcidius, both of whom were influential in the development of Roman law during the first century BC.

== Members ==
- Gaius Falcidius, tribune of the plebs and legate in uncertain years. He was mentioned by Cicero in his speech in favour of the Lex Manilia, 66 BC.
- Publius Falcidius, tribune of the plebs in BC 40, was the author of the Lex Falcidia de Legatis, which remained in force in the sixth century AD, when it was incorporated by Justinian in the Institutiones. It enacted that at least a fourth of the estate or property of a testator should be secured to the heres scriptus. Cassius Dio mentions the law, but apparently misunderstood its purpose.

== See also ==
- List of Roman gentes
