= Publius Annius Asellus =

Ancient Roman senator

Publius (or Gaius) Annius Asellus was a senator of Ancient Rome who had not been included in the census—that is, avoided a correct reckoning of his true wealth—and died, leaving his only daughter to be his heir (or heres). We know of him almost entirely from a single anecdote of Cicero's in his In Verrem. Scholars do not agree on whether we ought to understand this to have been a deliberate obfuscation or a simple coincidence owing to the timing of the census.

The property, however, was seized by Verres, the praetor urbanus, on the grounds that such a bequest was in violation of the Lex Voconia, and regardless of the fact that it had not been reckoned in the census as being above the threshold to qualify as being in scope for that law.
