= Costanza Varano =

Costanza Varano (1426–1447) was a noted humanist, scholar, and writer in early modern Italy. She is regarded as "one of the best known learned women" of the mid-15th century.

== Life and education ==
Varano was the first child born to Pier Gentile da Varano, lord of Camerino, and Elisabetta Malatesta. She was born in Camerino in 1426. Her father was lord of Camerino until his death in 1433, while her mother was the daughter of scholar Battista da Montefeltro Malatesta and Galeazzo Malatesta, lord of Pesaro until 1444. She had one known brother, Rodolfo, heir to Camerino. In her early years, the family lived in the Varano family palace, Palazzo Ducale, in Camerino, which rests in the heart of the Marche region. In 1433, Pier Gentile da Varano was executed by his brothers during a struggle to rule the city of Camerino. In the aftermath, her mother fled to Pesaro in 1434 with Costanza, her brother Rodolfo, and two other children, where her grandmother and grandfather lived.

Varano's education in Latin was perhaps her most notable accomplishment. Battista da Montefeltro Malatesta, a scholar, active ruler in Pesaro, and pioneer of education for women helped educate Costanza. Varano received what would have been a fairly standard education for a boy at the time, but a unique education for a girl, exclusive to women of status. Like many aristocratic daughters in the 15th century, Varano came from a home where education was valued. Women of wealth and influence in the 15th century were expected to have some education as they were sometimes rulers of their cities and often entrusted to educate their heirs, the future rulers of their cities. During the 15th century, the humanist movement had taken hold of Italy, and women of affluence were able to receive an education that encouraged writing and speaking with eloquence and clarity. While women were a small minority in the humanist movement during their time, their contribution to the development of the Renaissance and evolution of intellectual life in modern Europe was significant. Margaret King argues that Varano, like most educated women of the time, failed to realize her potential within the field of humanism beyond her adolescence, when women were expected to marry and relinquish their lives of learning.

During her time in Pesaro, it is believed that Varano was also taught by the notary Antonio de Strullis da Coldazzo, and possibly Giacomo da Pesaro. Varano was educated in both Latin and Greek, and her knowledge was considered exceptional compared to other women in 15th century Italy.

Battista Sforza
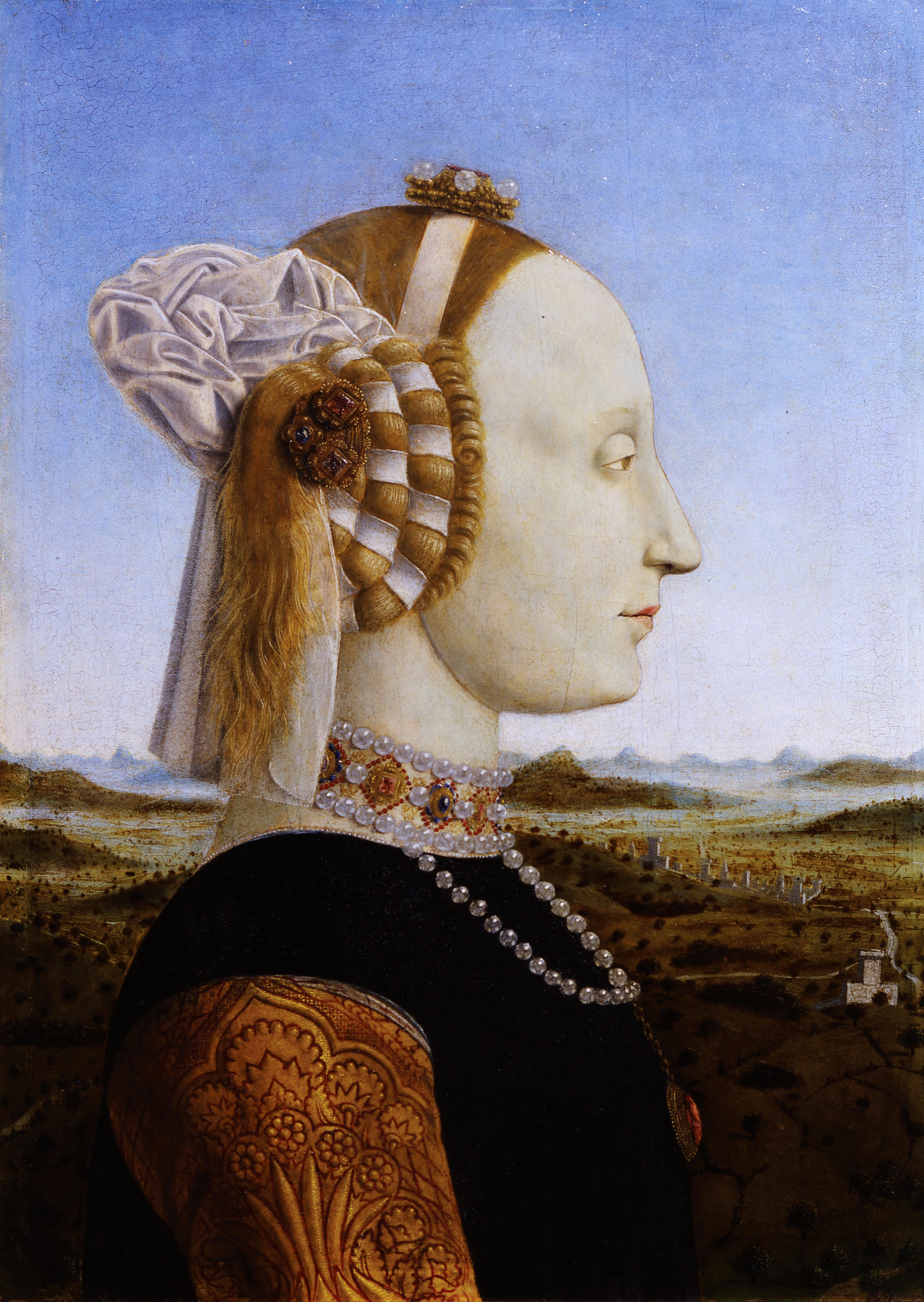
- Battista Sforza, by Piero della Francesca

Varano was wed to Alessandro Sforza, on December 8, 1444, after his previous proposals to Costanza were rejected by her mother, who believed Alessandro (then a knight and warrior) was unfit to wed a woman of a ruling dynasty when he had no land of his own. The marriage was part of a settlement between the Malatesta of Pesaro (Costanza's family) and the Malatesta of Remini which forged an alliance with the Sforza that stabilized Camerino; her grandfather, Galeazzo sold the city of Pesaro to Alessandro, who became lord thereafter. Despite the transaction-centered arrangement, it is believed that Alessandro truly loved Varano, and acquired Pesaro in part to win her heart. She gave birth to her daughter Battista Sforza in 1446 and one year later, Costanza died in Pesaro, either during the birth of her son, Costanzo Sforza, or shortly after due to complications. Her funeral oration was delivered by Giacomo da Pesaro, which reflected her high esteem. Her daughter Battista was considered a prodigy in her youth, and went on to continue her family's legacy of educated women.

== Letters, orations, and poems ==
Several of the letters, orations, and poems of Costanza Varano are preserved. Costanza is "famed as a poet and for her advocacy of education as well as the public orations she gave in support of her city." Like her grandmother before her and daughter after, Costanza demonstrated that Renaissance women helped redefine expectations for the role of women that established a tradition of female education and played a critical role in the culture of the Marche. The Montefeltro/Varano/Sforza dynasty of women established a legacy of learned women unique to their time and place in early modern Italy that is singular and extraordinary when compared to average humanist education of the time. Varano, her grandmother, mother and daughter were all politically involved women, often speaking publicly on their families' behalf because their male counterparts could not. Further, their ruling dynasty seems to have appreciated that intelligent women with contemporary education were capable co-rulers.

The most significant aspect of Varano's education was her fluency in Latin. Learning Latin was almost exclusive to men in that time and mastery of Latin was considered a mark of excellent education. Her Latin is described as less polished than that of humanist scholars of later decades, because she demonstrated occasional irregularities and obscurities. However, her Latin was comparable to most of her male contemporaries, and as a result she earned the respect of other scholars and politicians. Learned women of the time typically demonstrated low self-confidence in their works through self-deprecation and Varano was no exception. Her speeches and letters often included phrases about her ineptitude in Latin, her ignorance, and her inexperience. Despite this self-effacing, her Latin literacy is particularly remarkable because early modern Europe considered Latin to be fundamental to institutions of male power and authority. She was praised in her time by male humanists, who were often impressed by learned women because they were so rare, and because their eloquence and clarity was comparable to their own. Similarly, modern scholars praise her accomplishments for their rarity in their time, as well as for her achievements at such a young age. Costanza used her poems and orations to exact promises from her family, request the return of land, and make requests on her family's behalf while she was only a teenager.

In 1442 before she married Sforza, Varano traveled to see Bianca Maria Visconti wife of Francesco Sforza, whom, at the time, controlled Camerino and later became ruler of Milan. There, Varano delivered a speech to Bianca Maria Visconti to request that Camerino be returned to the control of the Varano family under the leadership of her brother, Rodolfo, and cousin, Giulio Cesare. Her oration attests to her learning and is believed to be part of the reason Francesco returned the city to the Varano family (though scholars speculate that her marriage to Alessandro Sforza, Francesco's brother, had more to do with that decision than her speech). The oration was commended by Guiniforte Barzizza for its style. She additionally wrote a letter and poem to the King Alfonso V of Aragon in the same year on her brother's behalf.

In a letter to Isotta Nogarola in 1442, Varano demonstrated how learned women supported the education of other women through their letters and praise of intelligence. She also promises continued learning, which was both remarkable for the time and a testament to her family's legacy of learned women. Her poem to Oddantonio da Montefeltro and verses to Gianlucido Gonzaga in 1443 are political, seeking the return of land to her family as her speech to Bianca did. Additionally, in 1447, she wrote to the pope Eugenuis IV, requesting the remission of the excommunication of her grandfather.

Humanist careers were far less common in women than education was, and two socially acceptable paths were available to educated women: marriage or religious vows. Like other notable female scholars in early modern Northern Italy to whom she is compared (Ginevra Nogarola and Caterina Caldiera, for example), Costanza married and her Latin humanist education ceased.

Costanza, along with being a writer, scholar and orator, improved the education system in Pesaro when she invited teachers to the city. Her family's grammar teacher, Giacomo da Pesaro, dedicated his De octo partibus orations to Costanza, and after her death, many eulogies were written to praise and celebrate her fame and intellect.

== List of works ==
- Letter to Isotta Nogarola, c. 1442, as quoted in King & Rabil (1983), pp. 55–56
- Oration to Bianca Maria Visconti, c. 1442, as quoted in King & Rabil (1983), pp. 39–41
- Oration to the people of Camerino, c. 1442, as quoted in King & Rabil (1983), pp. 42–44
- Letter to Lady Ceclia Gonzaga, c. 1444, as quoted in King & Rabil (1983), pp. 53–54
- Letter to Isotta Nogarola, c. 1442, Latin pp 35–56, as quoted in Parker (2002), pp. 35–36 (Latin), 43–44 (English)
- Poem to Isotta Nogarola, c. 1442, as quoted in Parker (2002), pp. 36 (Latin), 44–45 (English)
- Oration to the people of Camerino, c. 1442, as quoted in Parker (2002), pp. 40–41 (Latin), 49–50 (English)
- Poem to the people of Camerino, c. 1442, as quoted in Parker (2002), pp. 42 (Latin), 50–51 (English)
- Poem to Oddantonio da Montefeltro, c. 1442–1443, as quoted in Parker (2002), pp. 39 (Latin), 47–48 (English)
- Verses to Gianlucido Gonzaga, c. 1443, as quoted in Parker (2002), pp. 39–40 (Latin), 48–49 (English)
- Letter to King Alfonso V of Aragon, c. 1444, as quoted in Parker (2002), pp. 36–38 (Latin), 45–46 (English)
- Poem to King Alfonso V of Aragon, c. 1444, as quoted in Parker (2002), pp. 38 (Latin), 46–47 (English)
- Poem to Pope Eugenius IV, c. 1447–1448, as quoted in Parker (2002), pp. 42–43 (Latin), 51–52 (English)

== Notes ==
=== References ===
- Churchill, Laurie J.; Brown, Phyllis R.; Jeffrey, Jane E., eds. (2002). Women Writing Latin: From Early Roman Antiquity to Early Modern Europe. Vol. 3. New York: Routledge. ISBN 9780415942478.
- Clough, Cecil H. (1996). "Daughters and wives of the Montefeltro: outstanding bluestockings of the Quattrocento". Renaissance Studies. 10 (1): 31–55. doi:10.1111/j.1477-4658.1996.tb00002.x.
- King, Margaret L. (1980). "Book-lined cells: women and humanism in the early Italian Renaissance". In Patricia H. Labalme (ed.). Beyond Their Sex: Learned Women of the European Past. New York: New York University Press. pp. 66–90. ISBN 9780814749982.
- King, Margaret L.; Rabil, Albert Jr., eds. (1983). Her Immaculate Hand: Selected Works By and About the Women Humanists of Quattrocentro Italy. Binghamton: Medieval & Renaissance Texts & Studies.
- Parker, Holt N. (2002). "Costanza Varano (1426–1447): Latin as an instrument of state". In Laurie J. Churchill, Phyllis R. Brown & Jane E. Jeffrey (ed.). Women Writing Latin: From Early Roman Antiquity to Early Modern Europe. Vol. 3. New York: Routledge. pp. 31–53. ISBN 9780415942478.
- Robin, Diana; Larson, Anne R.; Levin, Carole, eds. (2007). Encyclopedia of Women in the Renaissance: Italy, France and England. Santa Barbara, CA: ABC-CLIO.
- Webb, Jennifer D. (2012). "Hidden in plain sight: Varano and Sforza women of the Marche". In Katherine A. McIver (ed.). Wives, Widows, Mistresses, and Nuns in Early Modern Italy: Making the Invisible Visible through Art and Patronage. Burlington: Ashgate. pp. 13–32.
