= Agnese di Montefeltro =

Italian noblewoman, wife, mother, poet

Agnesi di Montefeltro
- Born: 1470; Gubbio, Perugia, Umbria, present-day Italy
- Died: 1 April 1523 (aged 52 or 53); Rome, Papal States, present-day Italy
- Noble family: Montefeltro
- Spouse: Fabrizio Colonna
- Issue: Vittoria Colonna (1490-1557); Federico Colonna (c. 1497-1516); Ascanio Colonna (d. 1557); Ferdinando Colonna; Camillo Colonna; Marcello Colonna
- Father: Federico da Montefeltro, Duke of Urbino
- Mother: Battista Sforza, Duchess of Urbino

Agnese di Montefeltro (Gubbio, 1470 – Rome, 1523) was the daughter of Federico da Montefeltro, duke of Urbino and of his second wife, Battista Sforza. She was married to Fabrizio Colonna (1460–1520), duke of Paliano with whom she had six children, among which was the poet Vittoria Colonna. She died, a widow, in 1522 on her way home to Rome, coming back from a pilgrimage at Loreto Sanctuary.

== Biography ==
Little is known about Agnese's childhood. Her mother died in 1472 when she was only two years old. Her father died in 1482, when Agnese was twelve, after which she was entrusted to the care of her paternal uncle, Ottaviano Ubaldini della Carda, along with her elder sisters. She may have been educated by the humanist Vespasianus Bisticci, a former curator of the library of duke Frederick. However, the education received at the court of Urbino and the influence of female family members helped form Agnese's character, who remained in contact throughout their lives.

On 20 January 1489, she married Fabrizio Colonna, who was an important member of the Roman baronial lineage. The marriage contract, signed the year before, asked for the payment of a dowry of 12,000 gold florins. This marriage was part of a strategy to consolidate a network of marriage alliances between the families of Montefeltro and Della Rovere, the Sanseverino, Malatesta, Gonzaga and, indeed, the Colonna.

Her son Federico died in 1516 and she became a widow three years later with the death of her husband Fabrizio in 1520.
