= Cave, Lazio =

Cave
- Comune
- Comune di Cave
- Coat of arms

- Cave within the Metropolitan City of Rome

- Location within Italy Location within Lazio
- Coordinates: 41°49′N 12°56′E
- Country: Italy
- Region: Lazio
- Metropolitan city: Rome (RM)
- Frazioni: Collepalme, San Bartolomeo

Government
  - Mayor: Angelo Lupi (since 26-5-2014)

Area
  - Total: 17 km^{2} (6.6 sq mi)
- Elevation: 399 m (1,309 ft)

Population (31 December 2014)
  - Total: 11,244
  - Density: 660/km^{2} (1,700/sq mi)
- Demonym(s): Cavesi, Cavensi or Caviselli
- Time zone: UTC+1 (CET)
  - Summer (DST): UTC+2 (CEST)
- Postal code: 00033
- Dialing code: 06
- Patron saint: Madonna del Campo and St. Lawrence
- Saint day: 27 April and 10 August
- Website: Official website

Cave is a town and comune in the Latium region of Italy, 42 kilometres (26 mi) southeast of Rome. As of 2011 its population was 10,421.

== History ==
The town was mentioned first in 998 AD, and was later a fief of the Colonna family. In 1482 it was besieged by Pope Sixtus IV and obliged to surrender. It is especially known for the Treaty of Cave, signed on 12 September 1557 by plenipotentiaries of Pope Paul IV and Fernando Álvarez de Toledo, the Spanish viceroy of Naples.

== Geography ==
Cave borders Castel San Pietro Romano, Genazzano, Palestrina, Rocca di Cave, and Valmontone. It counts the hamlets (frazioni) of Collepalme and San Bartolomeo.
