= Publius Falcidius =

1st century BC Roman Tribune of the Plebs

Publius Falcidius was an ancient Roman Tribune of the Plebs in 40 BCE, of the gens Falcidia.

He was the author of the Lex Falcidia de Legatis, a law on inheritance which remained in force in the sixth century CE, since it was incorporated by Justinian in the Institutes. Under this law, legacies (i.e. gifts to third parties) could not take up more than three-quarters of the total estate (i.e. the heirs had to receive at least a quarter). If the legacies were more than this amount, then they would be reduced in order to ensure that the heirs received a quarter of the total value of the estate.

The Falcidius mentioned by Cicero in his speech for the Lex Manilia had the praenomen Caius. He had been Tribune of the Plebs and legatus, but in what year is unknown.
