= Vittoria Colonna =

Italian poet and noble

- Marchioness of Pescara
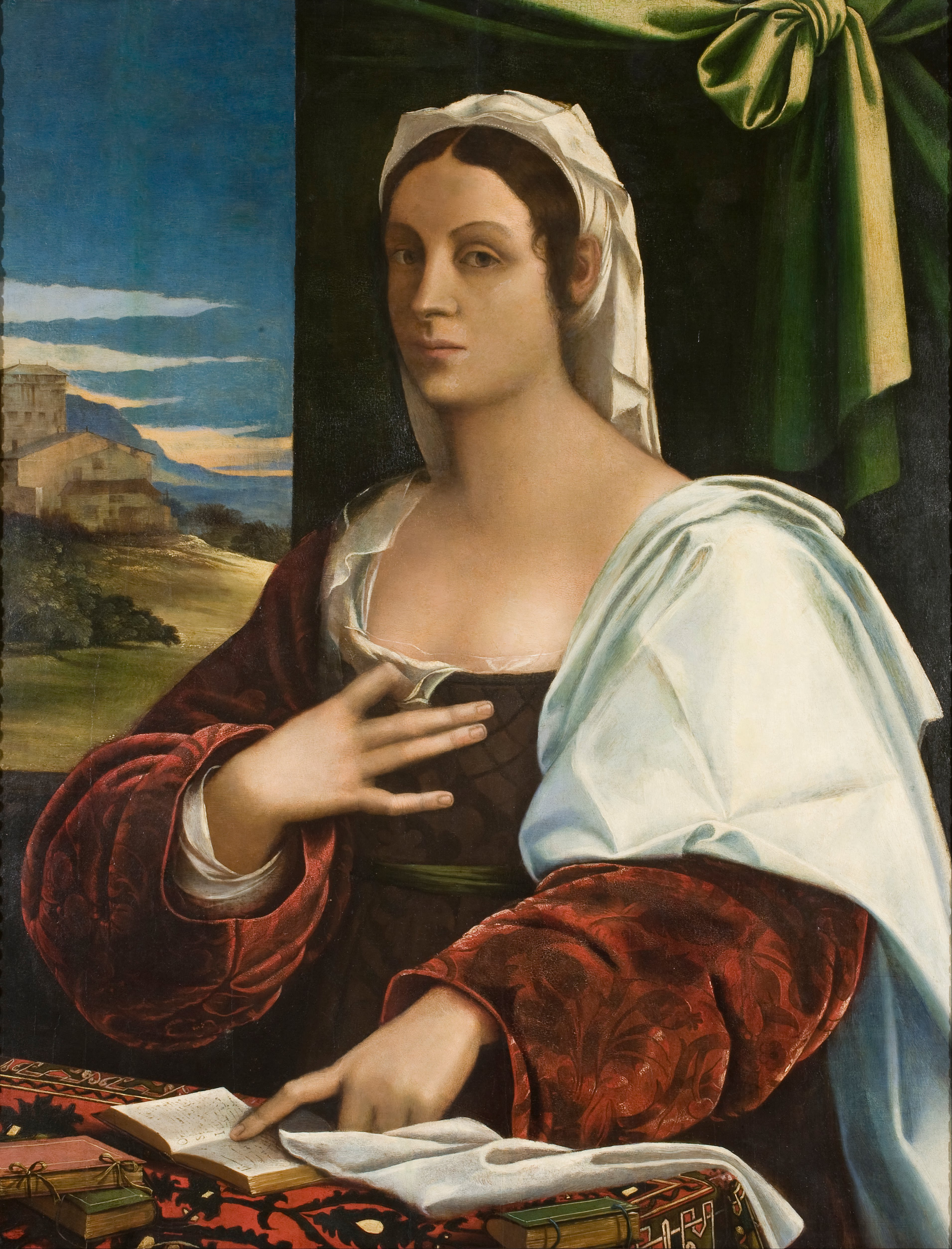
- Vittoria Colonna, by Sebastiano del Piombo, c. 1520
- Born: April 1490; Marino, Papal States (present-day Italy)
- Died: 25 February 1547 (aged 56); Rome, Papal States (present-day Italy)
- Noble family: Colonna
- Spouse: Fernando Francesco d'Ávalos, Marquis of Pescara (m. 1509; died 1525)
- Father: Fabrizio Colonna
- Mother: Agnese da Montefeltro
- Occupation: Poet

Vittoria Colonna (April 1492 – 25 February 1547), Marchioness of Pescara, was an Italian noblewoman and poet. As an educated and married noblewoman whose husband was in captivity, Colonna was able to develop relationships within the intellectual circles of Ischia and Naples. Her early poetry began to attract attention in the late 1510s and she ultimately became one of the most popular poets of 16th-century Italy. Upon the early death of her husband, she took refuge at a convent in Rome. She remained a laywoman but experienced a strong spiritual renewal and remained devoutly religious for the rest of her life.

== Early life and marriage ==
Colonna was born at Marino in 1492, a fief of the Colonna family in the Alban Hills, near Rome. She was the daughter of Fabrizio Colonna, grand constable of the Kingdom of Naples, and of Agnese da Montefeltro, daughter of the Duke of Urbino. She was engaged in 1495 at the age of 3 years old to "Ferrante" Fernando Francesco d'Ávalos, son of the marquese di Pescara, at the insistence of Ferdinand, King of Naples.

In 1501, the Colonna family's possessions and land were confiscated by Pope Alexander VI, and the family moved to Ischia, the home of Colonna's betrothed. In Ischia, Colonna received a typical humanist education in literature and the arts from Costanza d'Avalos, the aunt of her betrothed, and gave early proof of a love of letters. Her hand was sought by many suitors, including the dukes of Savoy and Braganza, but she chose to marry d'Ávalos on the island of Ischia, on 27 December 1509. In Ischia, Vittoria Colonna became part of the literary circle of Costanza d'Avalos, Duchess of Francavilla, her husband's aunt.

The couple lived together in Ischia until 1511, when her husband offered his sword to the League against the French. He was taken captive in 1512 at the Battle of Ravenna and was conveyed to France. During the months of detention and the long years of campaigning that followed, Colonna and d'Avalos corresponded in the most passionate terms both in prose and verse, but only one poetic 'Epistle' to her husband has survived. Joseph Gibaldi has noted that Vittoria's poem to Ferrante was a direct imitation of Ovid's Heroides in which famous ancient women such as Dido and Medea address complaints to their absent lovers. Because it is the only extant poem by Vittoria Colonna before her husband's death, one may question whether her passionate verse reflected her true passion for her husband or were merely a stylish and scholarly reaction to a particular event. Also, it is known that Ferrante was not the most faithful husband since he had an affair with one of Isabella d'Este's ladies-in-waiting.

Between 1516 and 1522, Colonna lost three members of her family. Her younger brother, Federico, died in 1516, followed by her father, Fabrizio, in 1520 and her mother, Agnese, in 1522.

Colonna and d'Avalos seldom saw each other during their marriage since he was one of the most active and brilliant captains of Emperor Charles V. However, Colonna's influence was sufficient to keep her husband from joining the projected league against the emperor after the Battle of Pavia (1525) and to make him refuse the crown of Naples that had been offered to him as the price of his treason towards the French.

Colonna spent the summer of 1525 at her father's castle in Marino, where she fell ill, and she suffered illness for the rest of her life. It was during that time that she received an early manuscript copy of Baldessare Castiglione's The Book of the Courtier, which she had circulated around Naples. On 21 September, Castiglione wrote her a letter to lament that she had thus enabled the unpublished work to be partially transcribed, and the pirated version pushed Castiglione into hastening the publication of his book.

== Widowhood (1525–1547) ==
On 3 December 1525, Fernando died at Milan from the wounds that he had sustained at the Battle of Pavia. Colonna, who was hastening to tend him, received the news of his death at Viterbo She halted and retreated to the church of San Silvestro in Capite, in Rome, where there was a convent in the Order of Santa Chiara. Her request to take her vows and enter the convent was refused by Pope Clement VII and by her brother Ascanio, and she then returned to Ischia, where she remained for several years. Abigail Brundin has suggested Clement and Ascanio's motivations for refusing Colonna's request were that they hoped for a future marriage to create another desirable political alliance. However, she refused several suitors and dedicated herself to writing poetry.

The Sack of Rome (1527) finally gave the Colonna family the opportunity to improve their relationship with the Medici pope, Clement VII, by offering help to the Roman population. However, when the French army attacked Naples, the whole house of Avalos took refuge on the island of Ischia.

Nine months after the sack of the papal city, the historian Paolo Giovio arrived on Ischia after he had been invited by Colonna, where he stayed until 1528. During his stay on the island, he wrote his unpublished Dialogus de viris ac foeminis aetate nostra florentibus, which is set on Ischia between the end of September and the beginning of December 1527. In the third book of the dialogue, Giovio includes a ten-page encomium of Colonna.

In 1529, Colonna returned to Rome and spent the next few years between that city, Orvieto, Ischia and other places. Moreover, she tried to correct the wrongs of her late husband by asking the house of Avalos to return to the abbey of Montecassino some wrongfully seized land.

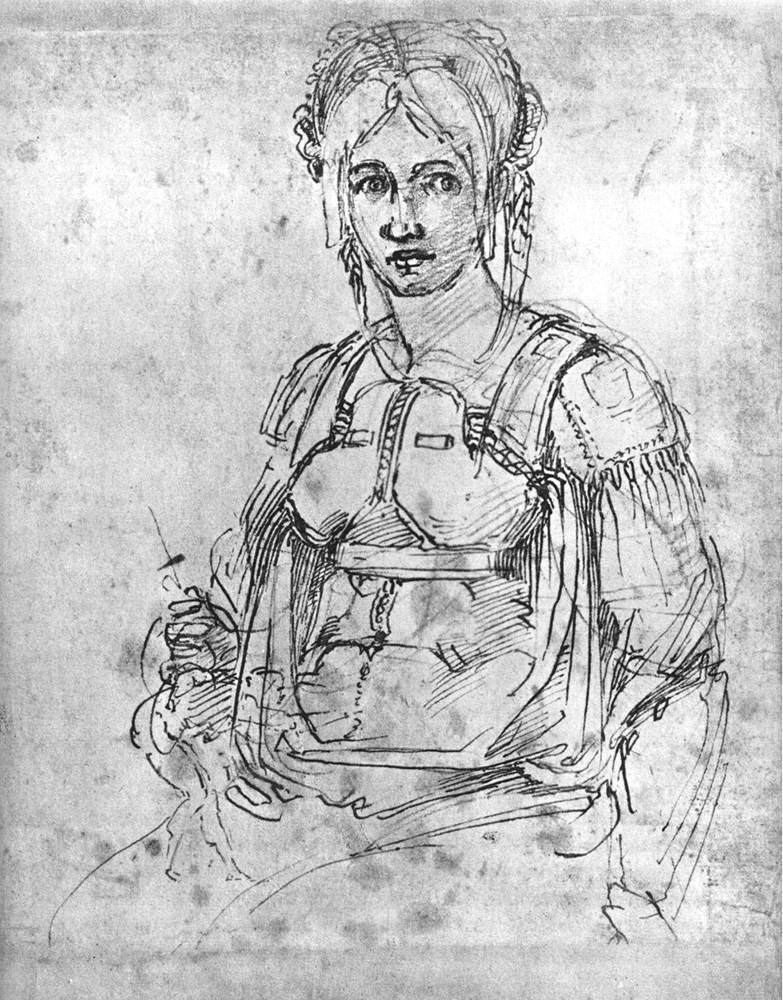
Vittoria Colonna, drawing by Michelangelo. Colonna was approximately 50 and Michelangelo 65 at the time of the drawing.

In 1532, before he died, Vittoria Colonna's cousin Cardinal Pompeo Colonna dedicated to her his Apologia mulierum (Women's Apologia), a treatise arguing that women should share in public offices and magistracies.

In 1535, her sister-in-law, Giovanna d'Aragona, separated from Colonna's brother Ascanio and came to Ischia. Colonna tried to reconcile them, but even though Giovanna refused, both women became close, supported Juan de Valdés and tried to intercede for Ascanio when he refused to pay salt tax to Pope Paul III.

At the age of 46, in 1536, she was back in Rome, where she won the esteem of Cardinals Reginald Pole and Contarini and began a passionate friendship with 61-year-old Michelangelo Buonarrotti. The great artist addressed some of his finest sonnets to her, made drawings for her and spent long hours in her company. She created a gift manuscript of spiritual poetry for him. Her removal to Orvieto and Viterbo in 1541, on the occasion of her brother's revolt against Paul III, produced no change in their relations, and they continued to visit and correspond as before.

On 8 May 1537, Colonna arrived in Ferrara with some other women with the intention of continuing to travel to Venice and then to the Holy Land. Her aim in Ferrara may have been to establish a Capuchin monastery for reforming monk Bernardino Ochino (who later became a Protestant). Her health made Vittoria stay in Ferrara until February of the next year. Her friends ultimately dissuaded her from travelling to the Holy Land, and she returned to Rome in 1538.

She returned to Rome in 1544, staying as usual at the convent of San Silvestro and died there on 25 February 1547.

Pietro Bembo, Luigi Alamanni, Baldassare Castiglione and Marguerite de Navarre were among her literary friends. She was also on intimate terms with many of the members of the Italian reform movement, such as Pietro Carnesecchi and Ochino, but she died before the church crisis in Italy became acute. Although she was an advocate of religious reform, there is no reason to believe that her religious convictions were irreconcilable with those of the Catholic Church and that she ever became a Protestant.

== Legacy ==
Though it was long believed that Colonna's poetry fell out of fashion after the 16th century, her poetry has been republished every century since, often in multiple editions. Her Rime amorose have been shown to have inspired the Spanish-Neapolitan poet Francisco de Aldana.

== List of works ==
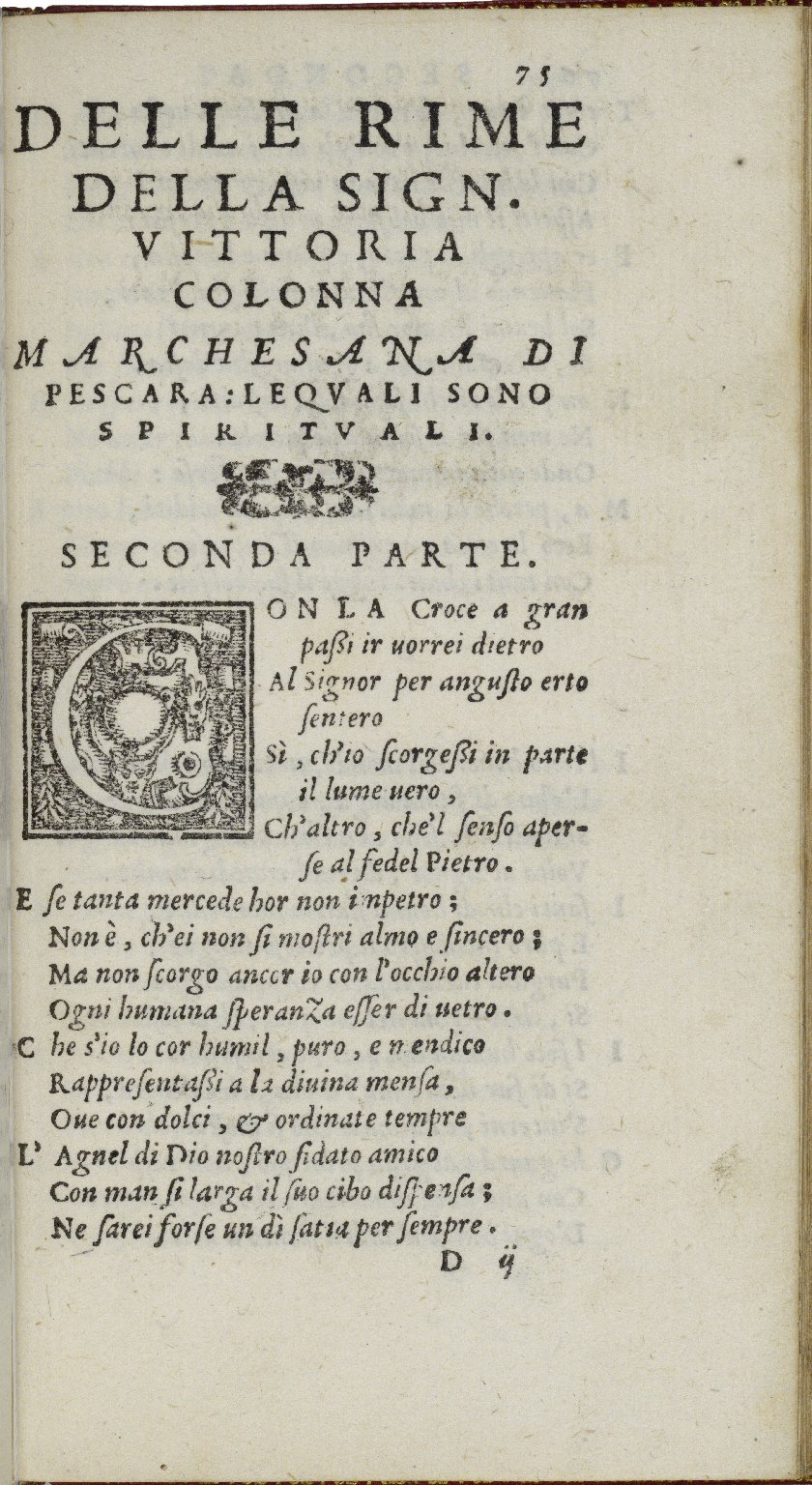
The title page of a 1559 edition of Colonna's poetry.

=== Poetry ===
- Rime de la Divina Vittoria Colonna Marchesa di Pescara. Nuovamente stampato con privilegio (in Italian), Parma: Al Dottisimo Messer Allessandro Vercelli Philippo Pirogallo, 1538
- Rime de la Diva Vettoria [sic] Colonna, De Pescara inclita Marchesana, Nuovamente [sic] aggiuntovi. XVI. Sonetti Spirituali, & le sue stanze (in Italian), Florence: Nicolo d'Arisotile, detto il Zoppino, da Ferrara, 1539
- Rime de la Divina Vettoria [sic] Colonna de pescara inclita Marchesana nuovamente aggiuntovi XXIIII. sonetti Spirituali, & le sue stanze, & uno triompho de la croce di Christo non-piu stampato con la sua tavola (in Italian), Venice: Per Comin de Trino ad instantia de Nicolo d'Aristotile detto Zoppino, 1540
- Dichiaratione fatta sopra la seconda parte delle Rime della Divina Vittoria Colonna [sic] Marchesana di Pescara. Da Rinaldo Corso... (in Italian), Bologna: Gianbattista de Phaelli, 1543
- Le rime spirituali della illustrissima Signora Vittoria Colonna Marchesana di Pescara (in Italian), Venice: Vincenzo Valgrisi, 1546, archived from the original on 12 December 2020

==== Published posthumously ====
- Le rime della Sig. Vittoria Colonna Marchesana Illustrissima di Pescara. Correte per M. Lodovico Dolce (in Italian), Venice: Gabriel Giolito de Ferrari et Fratelli, 1552
- Pianto della Marchesa di Pescara sopra la passione di Christo. Oratione della medesima sopra l'Ave Maria... etc (in Italian), Bologna: Manutio, 1557
- Tutte le Rime della Illustriss. et Eccellentiss. Signora Vittoria Colonna, Marchesana di Pescara. Con l'Espositione del Signor Rinaldo Corso, nuovamente mandate in luce da Girolamo Ruscelli (in Italian), Venice: Giovan Battista et Melchior Sessa Fratelli, 1558
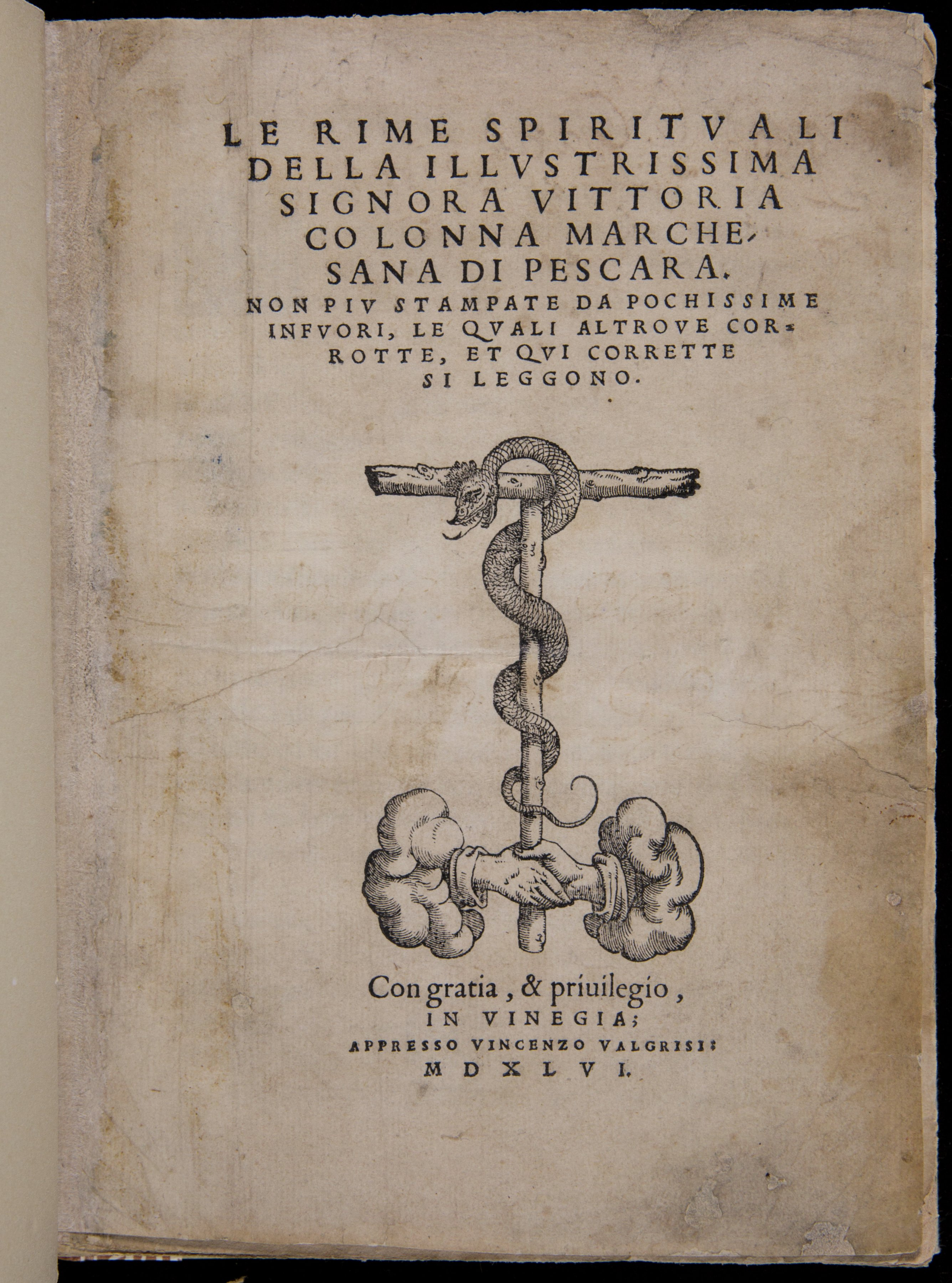
- Le Rime Spiritvali Della Illvstrissima
  Pianto della Marchesa di Pescara, sopra la Passione di Christo, con una Oratione della medesima, sopra l'Ave Maria. Oratione fatta il venerdi santo, sopra la passione di Christo (in Italian), In Vinegia appresso Gabriel Giolito de' Ferrari, 1563
- Quattordeci sonetti spirituali della illustrissima et eccellentissima divina Vittoria Colonna d'Avalos de Aquino Marchesa di Pescara (in Italian), Venice: Scotto, 1580
- Rime spirituali della S. Vittoria Colonna, Marchesana Illustrissima di Pescara (in Italian), Verona: Discepoli, 1586
- Alan Bullock, ed. (1982), Rime (in Italian), Rome: Laterza
- Tobia R. Toscano, ed. (1998), Sonetti in morte di Francesco Ferrante d'Avalos, marchese di Pescara: edizione del ms. XII.G.43 della Biblioteca Nazionale di Napoli (in Italian), Milan: Mondadori
- Abigail Brundin, ed. (2005), Sonnets for Michelangelo (in English and Italian), Chicago, IL: University of Chicago Press

== Modern editions ==
- Fly Not Too High Sonnets of Gabrielle de Coignard & Vittoria Colonna translated by John Gallas, Contemplative Poetry 6 (Oxford: SLG Press, 2022)
