= Marino Wine Festival =

Wine festival in the municipality of Marino, Italy

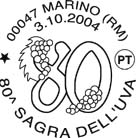
- Special postmark for the 80th edition of the festival
- Official name: Sagra dell'uva
- Also called: 'a Sagra (Marino dialect)
- Observed by: People of Marino, Italy
- Type: Sagra
- Significance: Christian victory in the Battle of Lepanto (1571); Marino DOC Wine; Feast of Our Lady of the Rosary
- Date: First Sunday in October
- First time: October 4, 1925; 100 years ago

The Marino Wine Festival ('a Sagra by antonomasia in Marino dialect) is a well-known traditional festival that occurs every first Sunday in October in Marino, a town in the province of Rome.

It was established in 1925 on the initiative of poet Leone Ciprelli and has been regularly organized every year since then. The Opera Nazionale Dopolavoro granted the event the title of Sagra, with which only a few other similar events in Italy could boast. Its roots, however, go back to earlier historical events: coinciding with the secular festival is the feast of Our Lady of the Rosary, celebrated to commemorate the victory of the Holy League against the Ottoman Empire at the Battle of Lepanto on October 7, 1571.

== History ==
=== Origins of the religious festival ===
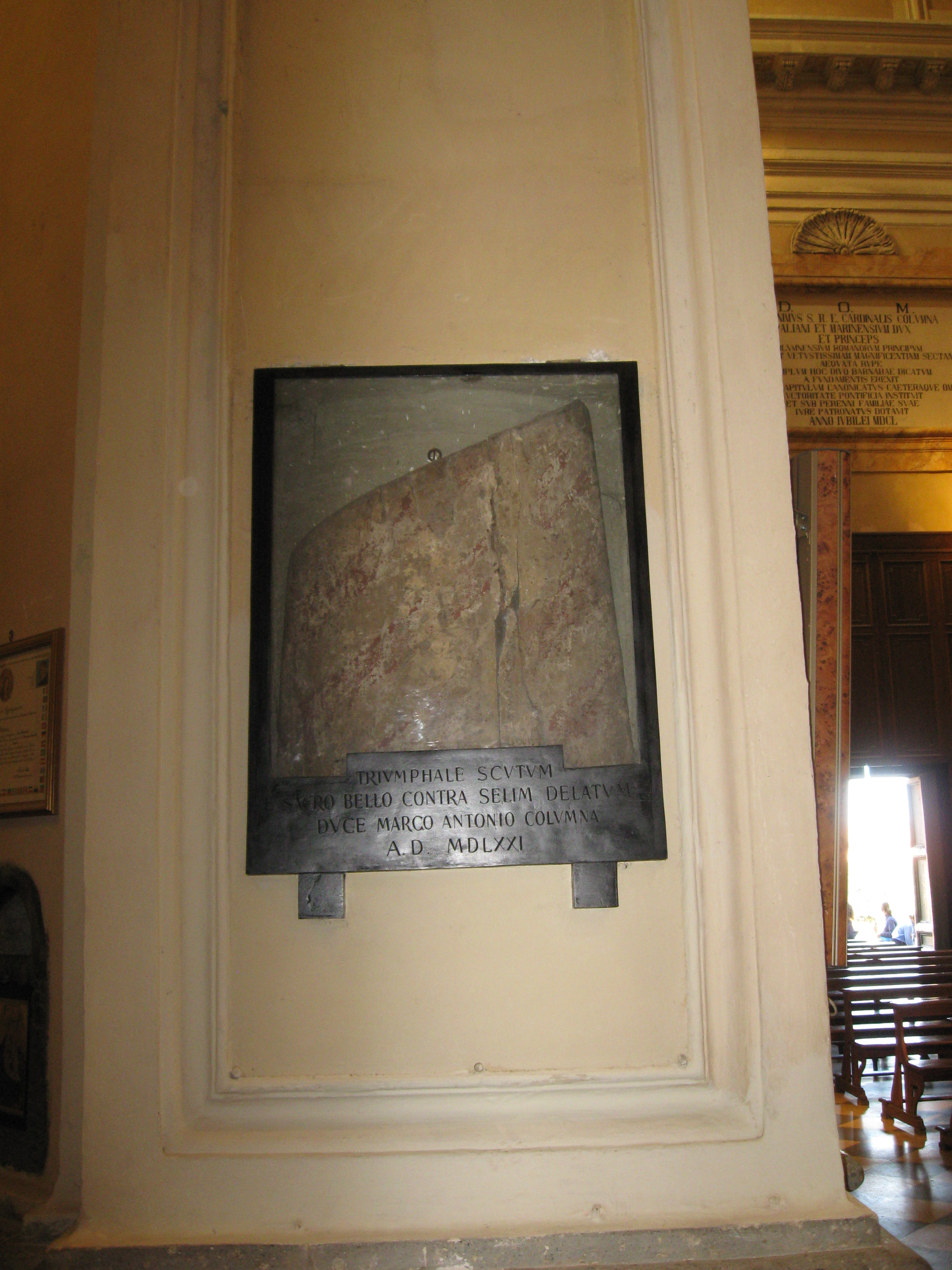
Turkish shield captured by Christians during the Battle of Lepanto, preserved in the Basilica of St. Barnabas

On October 7, 1571, the combined forces of Spain, the Papal States, the Republic of Genoa, the Republic of Venice, the Duchy of Savoy, and the Knights Hospitaller defeated the Ottoman naval forces commanded by Muezzinzade Ali Pasha at the Battle of Lepanto on the Isthmus of Corinth in Greece. The Christians, united for the occasion in the Holy League, were commanded by John of Austria, while the papal contingent was led by Marcantonio Colonna, lord of several Lazio fiefdoms including Marino.

After the victory, the Christian commanders returned to their own nations: Marcantonio Colonna landed at Gaeta and immediately went to Marino, where his wife Felicia Orsini and children were staying at Palazzo Colonna. The victorious commander's entry into Marino took place on November 4, 1571, and his stay lasted until December 4, the date of his triumphal entry into Rome that Pope Pius V wished to grant the admiral.

The expedition, which ended victoriously, had been placed under the protection of Our Lady of the Rosary depicted in the Standard of Lepanto, now preserved in Gaeta Cathedral where it was deposited by Marcantonio Colonna at the time of his landing. Therefore, Pope Pius V proclaimed Our Lady of the Rosary the patron saint of the Papal States and ordered that in all localities subject to his temporal rule the solemnity of Our Lady of the Rosary be celebrated on October 7 each year. This practice, certainly encouraged by the Colonna family, also took over in Marino. Marcantonio also deposited in the fief several war relics taken from the Ottomans, which were later deposited in the Basilica of St. Barnabas: today only one Turkish shield that survived the French plunder of 1798 remains.

With the establishment of the Sagra dell'Uva (Grape Festival) in 1924 and the fixing of the date of the event to the first Sunday in October, de facto in Marino the religious feast of Our Lady of the Rosary is generally celebrated on a different date from the one set by the Catholic Church, unless the first Sunday in October falls on the very 7th.

=== Origins of the secular festival ===
Marino DOC

Marino DOC wine is a white wine with a color that can vary between straw yellow to pale straw yellow. The smell is vinous and delicate, while the taste is dry or sweetish or sweet, distinctive, fruity. The alcohol content of the wine is around 11°, while the alcohol content of the grapes is 10.5°. The grape/hectare yield is 165 quintals per hectare: in the 1990/1991 vintage 88,530 liters of this wine were produced, while in 1995/1996 the quantity was halved to 48,262: this is due to the difficulties of small farms in coping with competition from larger competitors and the decline in the primary sector that is somewhat common throughout Italy. Marino, which obtained Denominazione di Origine Controllata wine status by decree-law of August 6, 1970, is made from Malvasia del Lazio and Malvasia di Candia. Some characteristic types are Marino superiore and Marino spumante.

Wine production in the territory of Marino has its roots already in the Roman age: ancient authors knew and appreciated much of the white wine produced in the area of the Alban Hills under the name of Albanum, from the name of the ancient city of Alba Longa, a legendary mother-city of Rome that stood precisely on the shores of Lake Albano. During the Middle Ages and then in the modern age viticulture represented the main source of employment in Marino and its territory, as well as in all neighboring municipalities.

In 1536 Emperor Charles V of Habsburg, visiting Rome, had the opportunity to drink Marino's wine during a banquet, and according to chronicles he expressed appreciation for it.

The people of Marino were very attached to viticulture, so much so that on several occasions they turned to the protection of Our Lady of the People, a miraculous thirteenth-century effigy preserved in the Basilica of St. Barnabas, to save the countryside from hailstorms or untimely rains. Even in 1611 the Community in an extraordinary assembly on February 2 chose to adopt as its patron saint "His Divine Majesty" St. Barnabas, so that he would protect the fief from some continuous hailstorms that had occurred in the previous three years.

At the beginning of the 20th century the idea arose to create a festivity to sponsor the product of the Marinese vineyards and to attract visitors to the city from Rome: transportation had been greatly facilitated with the completion of the Rome-Albano railroad in 1889; the gradual completion of the Roman Castles Tramways, which connected extensively almost all the localities of the Roman Castles with the capital, could only benefit the typical out-of-town tourism of the Romans.

Following a serious production crisis, caused by a series of natural disasters, the municipal administration thought in 1904 to draw attention to the local wine with a major event: the Feste Castromenie. The festivities took place between September 11 and October 10, 1904; it does not seem that they were repeated in the following years, until the Roman poet of Marinese origin Leone Ciprelli conceived the Sagra dell'Uva, in 1925.

=== 1920s ===
It may well be said that the whole of Rome is interested in the original and exceptional festivity, conceived, with a high sense of poetry by Leone Ciprelli, which will be celebrated tomorrow in Marino. [...] Tomorrow will be a truly memorable date for Marino.

— Il Messaggero, Saturday, October 3, 1925.

The Celebration Committee in charge of organizing the first Sagra was chaired by Luigi Capri Cruciani, who also offered much of the wine distributed from the fountains at 7 p.m. on Sunday, October 4, 1925. Among the events of the first edition were a horse race organized along Via Castrimeniense, a monumental lighting system with colored lights and the election of the Grand Magistrate of Grapes, who was in charge of choosing the best bunch. At 6 p.m. themed floats paraded.

During the second edition, on Sunday, October 3, 1926, the Queen of the Grape Harvest was elected for the first time, in San Barnaba Square, in a fashion somewhat similar to a modern beauty contest; the parade of floats was attended by actor Bruto Castellani. The I Concorso Poetico Musicale (First Musical Poetry Contest) was also held, with the jury presided over by the Roman poet Trilussa. The 1926 edition coincided with the celebrations of the seventh centenary of the death of St. Francis of Assisi, which were being held in nearby Albano Laziale: neither the Albano nor the Marino authorities agreed to move their respective events.

The third edition, on Sunday, October 2, 1927, was accompanied by unfavorable weather: however, the president of the Festival Committee, Barnaba Ingami, informed the press that "the fountains of Marino spout wine even under water." Since the mayor of London, Sir Rowland Blades, was visiting Rome, the people of Marino invited him to see the Sagra, declaring themselves willing to replicate the "miracle of the fountains" the following Tuesday. However, Sir Rowland did not travel to Marino.

On the occasion of the fourth edition, on Sunday, October 7, 1928, the abbot-parish priest Monsignor Guglielmo Grassi decided to bring in the religious procession for the first time also the Turkish shield kept in the Basilica of St. Barnabas, spoils of the Battle of Lepanto. The same edition of the Sagra dates back to a disagreement between podestà Ugo Gatti and the abbot-parish priest: the podestà demanded that the scene of the supplication to Our Lady of Pompeii be repeated a second time so that the late Istituto Luce film studio could film it: Monsignor Grassi refused.

In the fifth edition, the historical costume procession was held for the first time, on the initiative of Leone Ciprelli. In the newspaper La Tribuna, an anonymous article first polemicized the damage that could occur to the 17th-century fountain of the Four Moors, annually stifled by plasterboard installations.

Scholar Ugo Onorati has shown that in these years, roughly between 1926 and 1936, the Marinese festival was the second heart of Roman music, after the great event of San Giovanni. Through the promotion of Leone Ciprelli, the poetic-musical contests organized in Marino during the days of the Sagra attracted the attention of the greatest exponents of dialect poetry and music, from Trilussa and Petrolini to Romolo Balzani and Giuseppe Micheli.

=== 1930s ===
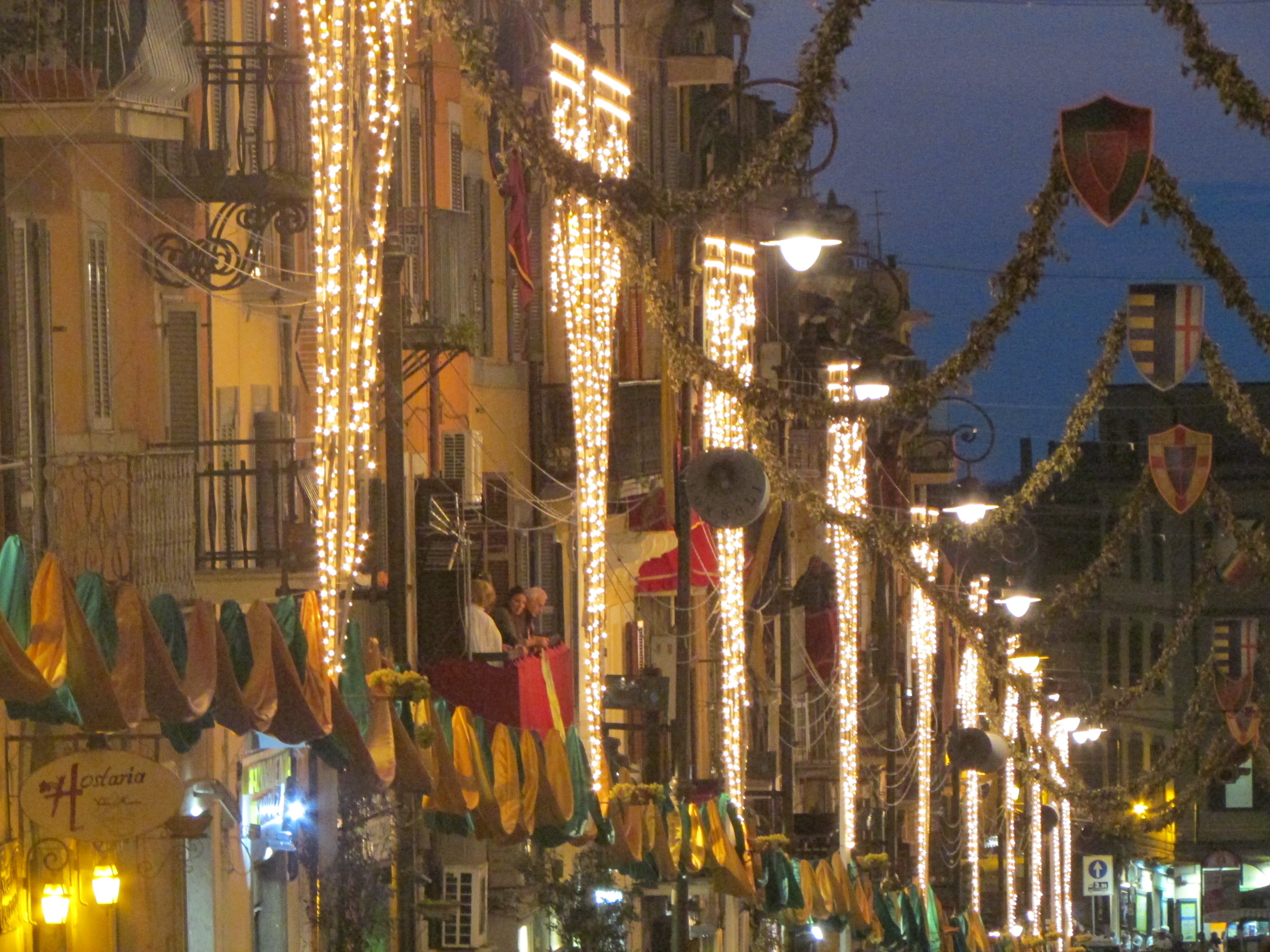
Detail of the night lighting of Corso Trieste for the 2014 edition

By now the Marino Festival has entered the number of grand festivals celebrated in Italy.

— Il Popolo di Roma, September 23, 1930.

On September 28, 1930, by order of the central fascist government, a Grape Festival was celebrated in all municipalities in Italy. In Marino, this occasion was only a preview of the traditional Sagra that was held on Sunday, October 5. For the occasion, the first Wine Shop in Italy was opened on the ground floor premises of Palazzo Colonna.

For the 1931 Sagra, Il Piccolo calculated a turnout of nearly 50,000 people. On the occasion of the 1932 Sagra, the Turkish shield preserved in the Basilica of San Barnaba was once again carried in procession. On the occasion of the ninth edition of the Sagra, on Sunday, October 1, 1933, the Ferrovie dello Stato and the Roman Castles tramways granted the application of the reduced popular fare for the routes between Rome and Marino.

On Sunday, October 6, 1934, for the eleventh edition of the Sagra, the EIAR, the state radio station, declared that it had installed some microphones in Marino to broadcast the various stages of the festival. In 1936, due to the Ethiopian War, the Sagra festivities took place in a subdued manner and were ignored by the national press. In compensation, the Sagras of the following years became a kind of showcase for the autarky imposed by the fascist regime. In 1940, for the sixteenth edition of the Sagra, the last one celebrated in grand style under the fascist regime, nearly 2,000 liters of wine were poured from the fountains.

=== 1940s ===
Thus reduced
It rained wine again
Of good omen
To the guests and to Marino!

— Leone Ciprelli, autumn 1945.

During the difficult years of the war, the Sagra celebrations were extremely limited due to World War II. Marino was hit several times by aerial bombardment and shelling, starting with the devastating bombing on February 2, 1944. Palazzo Colonna and the fountain of the Four Moors were completely destroyed by the bombs, and the basilica of San Barnaba was severely damaged. Over two hundred civilians lost their lives in the Anglo-American bombing.

The first post-World War II Sagra, the twenty-first edition, was held on Sunday, October 7, 1945, once again under the supervision of Leone Ciprelli, amid the rubble of war. Many Marinese people wanted to end this tradition, seen as a remnant of the ceased fascist regime, but Ciprelli managed to convince everyone of the goodness of the Sagra, which belonged to no one but the Marinese people.

For the twenty-first Sagra, in 1946, Mayor pro tempore Zaccaria Negroni, Leone Ciprelli and the 49 members of the Festival Committee resumed construction of the plasterboard structures around the fountains from which the wine was to flow. On Sunday, October 5, 1947, for the twenty-second edition, the Turkish shield was also brought back into precession.

In 1945 the Gotto d'Oro Social Winery had been founded, which at the time had the name "Goccia d'Oro," changed later by analogy with an Apulian winery: from the 1948 Sagra the new institution began to collaborate actively in the organization of the event, distributing wine from the semi-destroyed Four Moors fountain. On the occasion of the 1949 Sagra the scenic arched illuminations located along Corso Trieste made their first appearance.

=== 1950s ===
During the twenty-ninth Sagra dell'Uva on Sunday, October 4, 1953, the Festival Committee, authorities and some journalists organized a commemoration in memory of Leone Ciprelli, who died on January 30 of that year. Present among others were Senator Zaccaria Negroni and abbot-parish priest Giovanni Lovrovich.

For the organization of the thirty-first edition, on Sunday, October 2, 1955, the Pro Loco of Marino was established, with the purpose of continuously taking care of the organization of the event year by year. For the 1956 Sagra thus were drawn up the registers of expenses: there were revenues of £ 4,221,153 and expenditures of £ 4,187,172. In addition, numerous folkloric associations and bands began their activities, such as the Volemose Bene, which is still active, or the historic Marino Brinda.

For the thirty-third Sagra of 1957, Senator Zaccaria Negroni proposed to prefectural commissioner Nicola Marini d'Armenia to reopen the Bottega del Vino, which had been opened by the fascist regime, and entrust it to the Pro Loco. After the 1959 Sagra, on the other hand, a delegation of Marinese went to Pope John XXIII to offer a symbolic gift of grapes and wine: the pope reciprocated the visit to Marino in August 1962.

=== 1960s ===
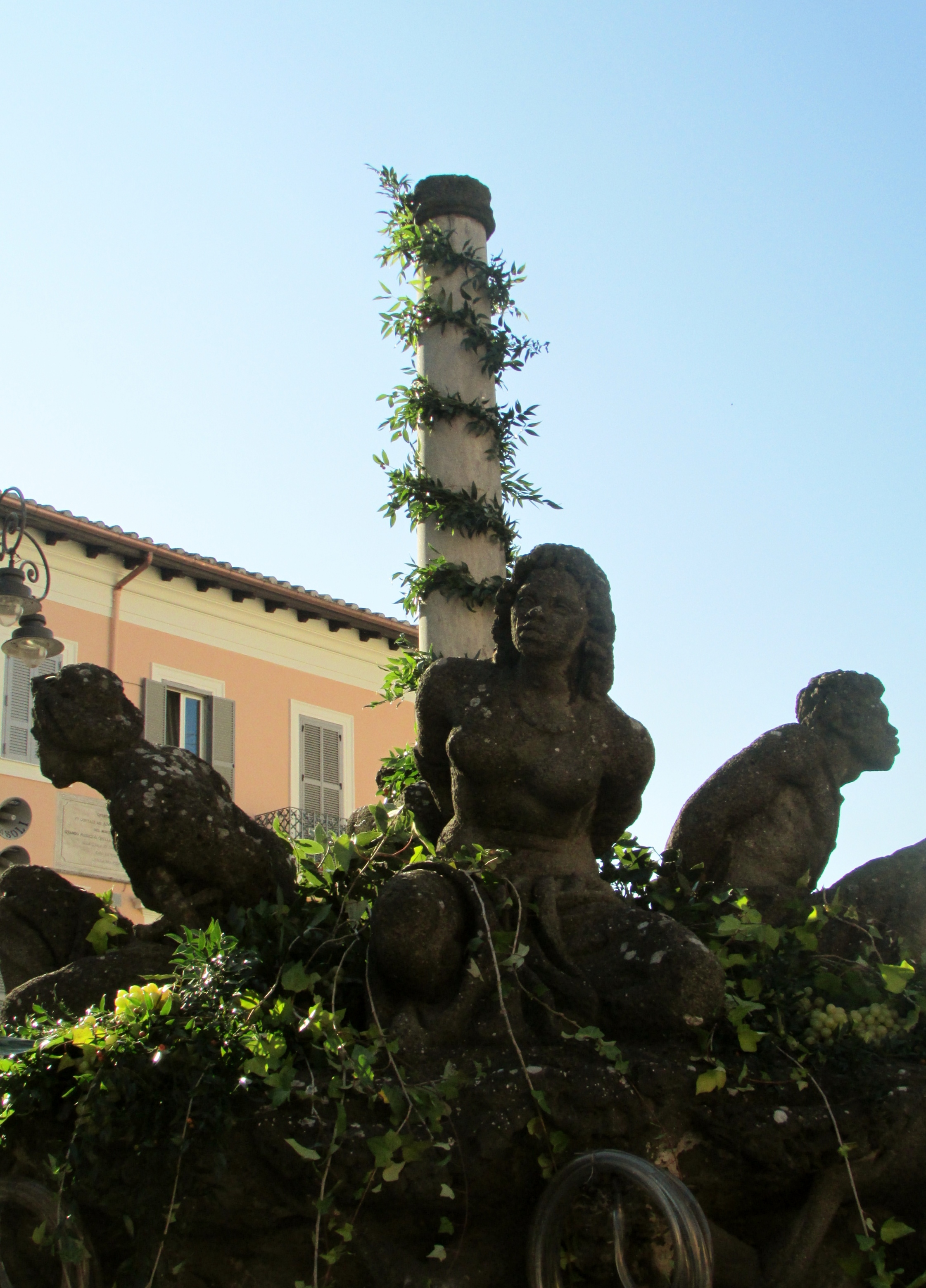
The Four Moors fountain decorated for the 2014 edition

At the thirty-sixth edition on Sunday, October 2, 1960, the atmosphere was still permeated by the aftermath of the Summer Olympics held in Rome: numerous sportsmen and foreign visitors took the opportunity to come to Marino for the festivities. Among the distinguished presences recorded in Marino in that edition was that of American actor Charlton Heston, who was besieged by the crowd and forced to flee.

For the thirty-seventh edition on October 1, 1961, Mayor Giulio Santarelli invited as guests of honor actress Sophia Loren with her husband Carlo Ponti: the couple owned a historic villa along the Via dei Laghi in Marino territory. The godmother of honor for the event was Virna Lisi. On Monday, October 2, 1961, a concert was held in Piazza San Barnaba with the participation of Carla Boni, Gino Latilla, Little Tony, Jenny Luna, Alighiero Noschese, Nunzio Gallo and Wolmer Beltrami.

The following year, 1962, a miscellaneous art show was organized with the participation of Domenico Modugno and Edoardo Vianello. In addition, the III Regional Horse Competition and the XIX Wine and Grape Show were held. As part of the events of the thirty-ninth edition of the event, in 1963, Leone Ciprelli's body was moved from Rome to the Marino Municipal Cemetery.

During the forty-first edition, on Sunday, October 3, 1965, Marino was the start and finish of the Giro del Lazio, a cycling competition of 250 km in length. In 1967, having reached the forty-third edition, the fountain of the Four Moors had been moved from its original location in Piazza Lepanto and placed in its current location in Piazza Matteotti: moreover, in the same edition, the custom of festively decorating the balconies of Corso Trieste was resumed.

In 1969, on the occasion of the forty-fifth edition of the Sagra, the History and Art group resumed organizing the historical costume procession that had been somewhat forgotten over the years.

=== 1970s ===
For the forty-sixth edition of the Sagra dell'Uva on Sunday, October 4, 1970, there was an evening concert by Banco del Mutuo Soccorso, a progressive rock group founded by Marinese Vittorio Nocenzi. The forty-seventh edition of the Sagra dell'Uva was marked by traffic jams. The main local chronicles reported on the massive traffic to and from Rome that paralyzed three consular roads. Momento Sera of Oct. 4, 1971 even declared, "the ottobrata of the Romans made the good soul of Napoleon pale as he tried to reach Paris after the Beresina."

The concert of the 1973 edition featured Ricchi e Poveri and Pippo Baudo, and the parade of the historical procession was also held exceptionally in the hamlets of Frattocchie and Santa Maria delle Mole, which were in constant urban growth. The fiftieth anniversary of the Sagra, on Sunday, October 6, 1974, went almost unnoticed because of the crisis Marino had fallen into after the separation of the hamlet of Ciampino, which became an autonomous municipality in July: the organization of the event had reverted to the Pro Loco. The floats also paraded through the streets of the hamlets.

In the editions of the 1970s there were numerous theatrical performances in dialect or by local authors, a sign of the vitality of Marinese theater. For the fifty-fourth edition in 1978, the overall expenditure for the organization amounted to £ 17,150,000. On Sunday, October 7, 1979, the II Biennial Exhibition of Marino Handicrafts was held inside the public park of Villa Desideri. The Festival Committee stated that 100 quintals of grapes and 3500 bottles of wine had been ordered.

=== 1980s ===
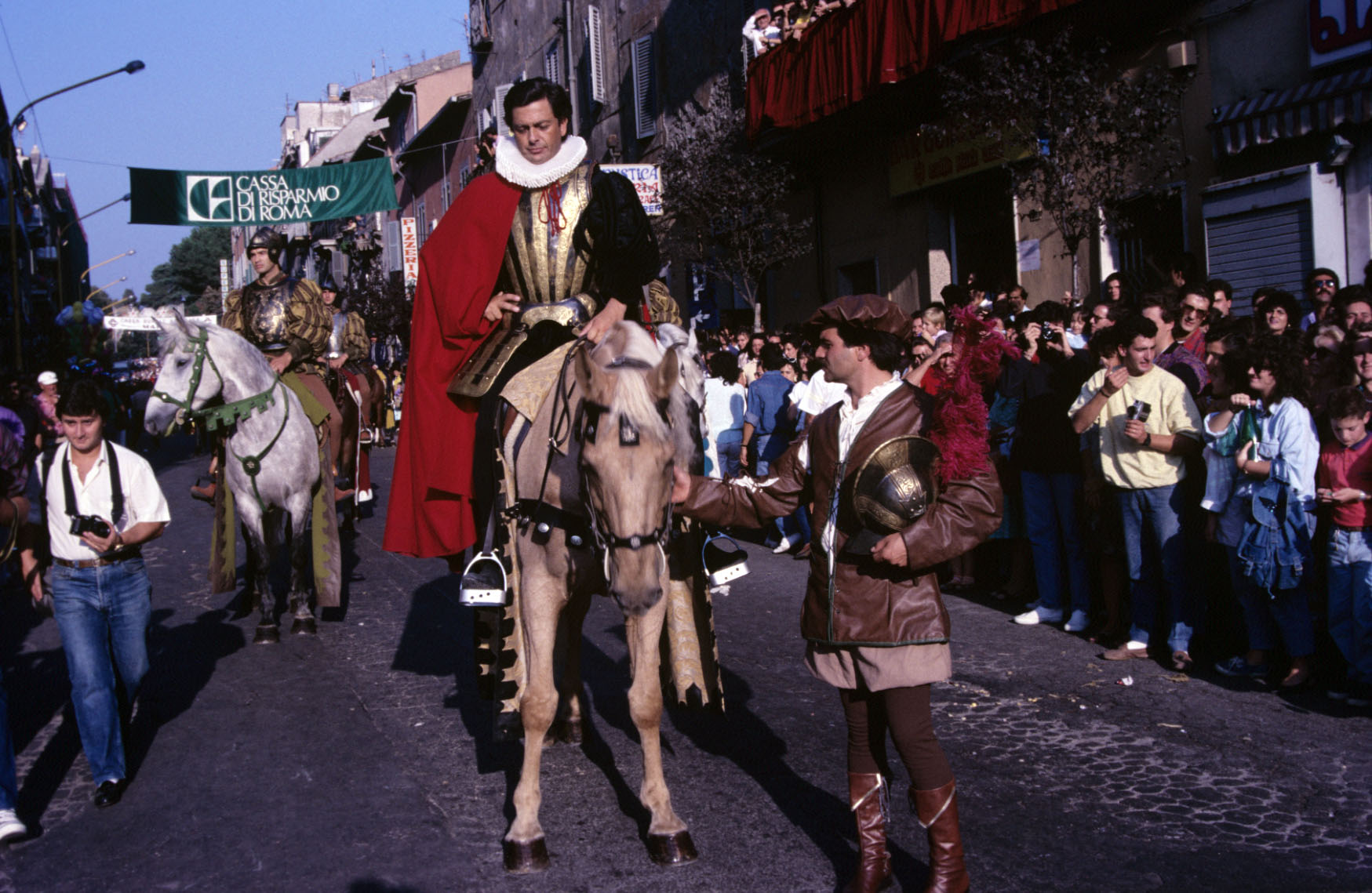
Andrea Giordana at the 1988 costume parade

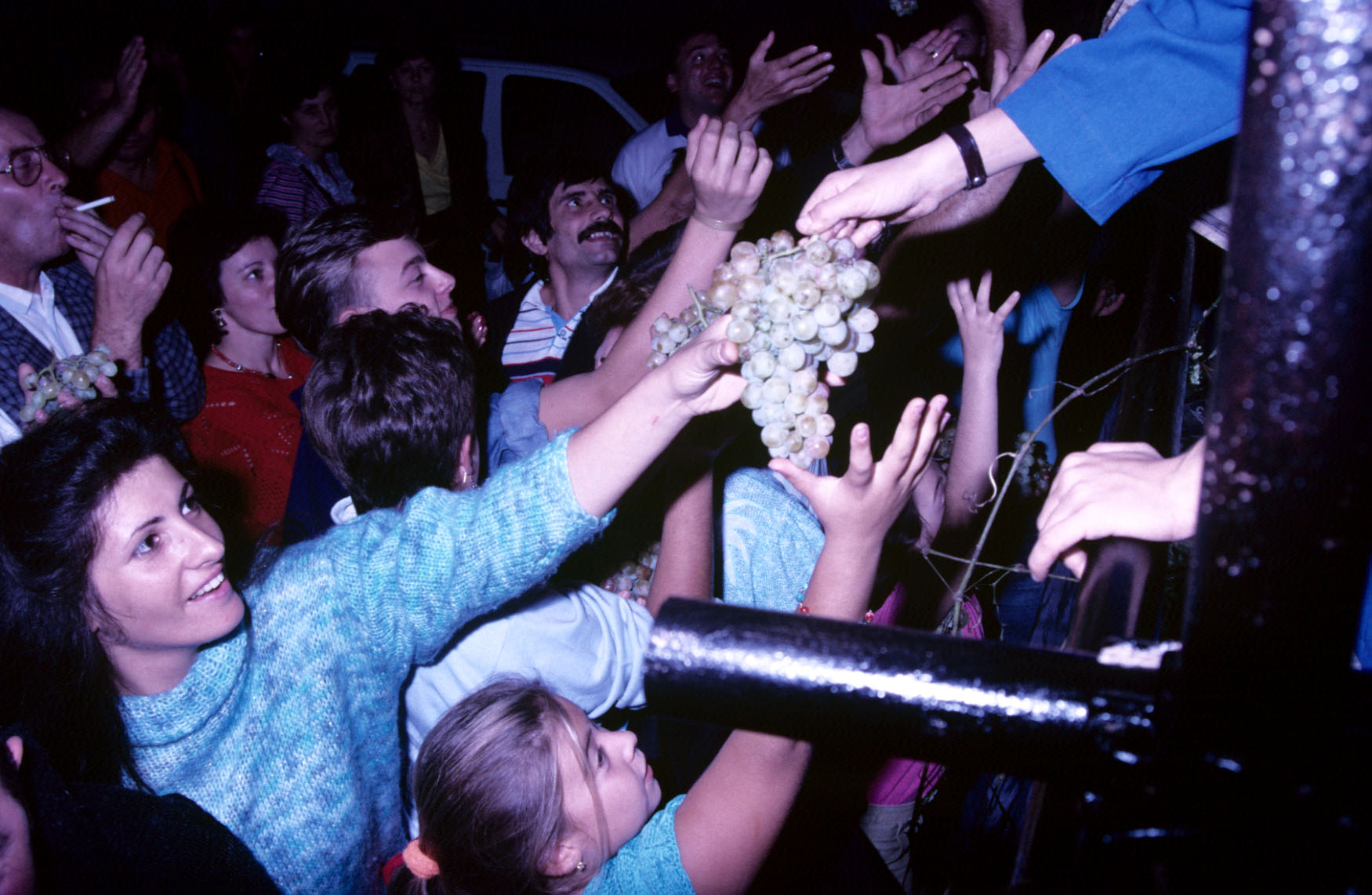
Giveaway of bunches of grapes

Sunday, October 5, 1980, marked the fifty-sixth Sagra. The city administration signed twinning agreements with the municipalities of Zaanstad (Netherlands) and Neukölln (Germany). A major band gathering was held in the city with the Enrico Ugolini Philharmonic Concert and other bands from Lazio. The most anticipated event, however, was Ivan Graziani's evening concert, which cost the organizers £5,280,000.

In 1981, a public fundraiser among citizens was held for the fifty-seventh edition, which yielded £7,820,000. Events included a concert by Banco del Mutuo Soccorso at the Municipal Stadium and a reception for representatives of the five twin cities at Palazzo Colonna.

On Sunday, October 3, 1982, the RAI television program Domenica in, hosted by Pippo Baudo, devoted a space to the fifty-eighth Sagra dell'Uva. During the 1983 Sagra a bust of Leone Ciprelli was relocated in the courtyard of Palazzo Colonna. In the same year, more than sixty wineries from Lazio participated in the Exhibition of Typical Wines of the Roman Castles. There was also the issuance of the first special illustrated cancellation for the Sagra dell'Uva by the Italian Postal Service.

The poster for the 60th edition, Sunday, October 7, 1984, was signed by Umberto Mastroianni, who had been residing permanently in Marino for several years at the prestigious Casino Colonna. During this edition, some protests were raised, led by the abbot-parish priest Giovanni Lovrovich, to drape a nude Dionysus made of plasterboard towering in the very central Pompeo Castiglia Square.

In preparation for the sixty-second edition, on Sunday, October 5, 1986, Mayor Giulio Santarelli created the Ente Sagra dell'Uva, which took on the task of organizing the event in a professional manner by turning away any voluntary contributions. The festivities for this edition began on September 20 with the departure of the "Giro del Lazio" and continued among exhibitions, cultural events and conferences until the show on the evening of Monday, October 6, with the participation of Gigi Sabani and Anna Oxa.

After the controversy related to the 1987 edition, in which the Ente Sagra did not organize the historical costume parade to avoid the onerous rental costs, the volunteer associations and the Pro Loco decided to create bit by bit the historical costumes that are still the attraction of the parade today. Pippo Franco was the star of the closing show of the sixty-third edition.

In 1988, for the sixty-fourth edition, the Ente Sagra organized the I International Stone Stage, while on Monday, October 3, the day of the "Sagretta," Rai 2 filmed the Marino Star miscellaneous art show held in Piazzale degli Eroi.

1989 was the year of the twinning with Irving, solemnized during the sixty-fifth edition of the Grape Festival. On the occasion of the same edition, a tribute of wine and grapes was brought by Marinese people to Pope John Paul II during his general audience at the Vatican.

=== 1990s ===
With the sixty-eighth edition of the Sagra on Sunday, October 4, 1992, the end of the Ente Sagra was decreed, whose organizational powers were given to the mayor and the Pro Loco. That edition included the II Incontro Polifonico Città di Marino, a festival of sacred choirs in the basilica of San Barnaba, a concert by African singer Rasely Hassou (Elia & Evolution Time) and a concert by Banco del Mutuo Soccorso. That year also saw the first edition of the Palio della Quintana organized by the Vascarelle district together with the other city districts and quarters.

In 1993, for the sixty-ninth edition, the memory of Leone Ciprelli was honored on the fortieth anniversary of his death, with the recitation of his play La Parrocchietta. On Sunday, October 2, 1994, under the management of prefectural commissioner Dr. Guglielmo Iozzia, the seventieth edition of the Sagra dell'Uva was held: a photographic exhibition curated by Vittorio Rufo, 70 years of Sagra, and an exhibition of the Denominazione di Origine Controllata wines of the province of Rome were organized.

On the occasion of the seventy-second edition, on Sunday, October 6, 1996, the premises, albeit not yet renovated, of the former convent of the Augustinian fathers at the church of Santa Maria delle Grazie in the Borgo Garibaldi district were reopened for the presentation of a district wine shop with the participation of the then mayor of Rome Francesco Rutelli. That same year, the Gotto d'Oro Social Winery celebrated its 50th anniversary with the distribution of 12,000 bottles of local sparkling wine. At the Municipal Stadium, a soccer match was held between the titular team of SS Lazio and a representative group of local youths, which ended in a 10-0 win for the White and Sky Blues.

For the 1996 edition, 5,000 liters of wine and 12,000 tons of grapes were distributed: 70,000 participants according to estimates by the Rome Police Headquarters. In 1997, the seventy-third edition, an exhibition of the works of sculptor Umberto Mastroianni was held, while a Sagra dei Piccoli was proposed for the first time.

The poster for the 1998 edition was signed by cartoonist Giorgio Forattini, and depicted all the most famous political figures of the time - from Oscar Luigi Scalfaro to Giulio Andreotti - bottled in a bottle of white wine: for the same edition, a Turkish flag relic of the 1571 Battle of Lepanto was flown in from Spelonga, a hamlet of Arquata del Tronto, Marche.

=== 2000s ===
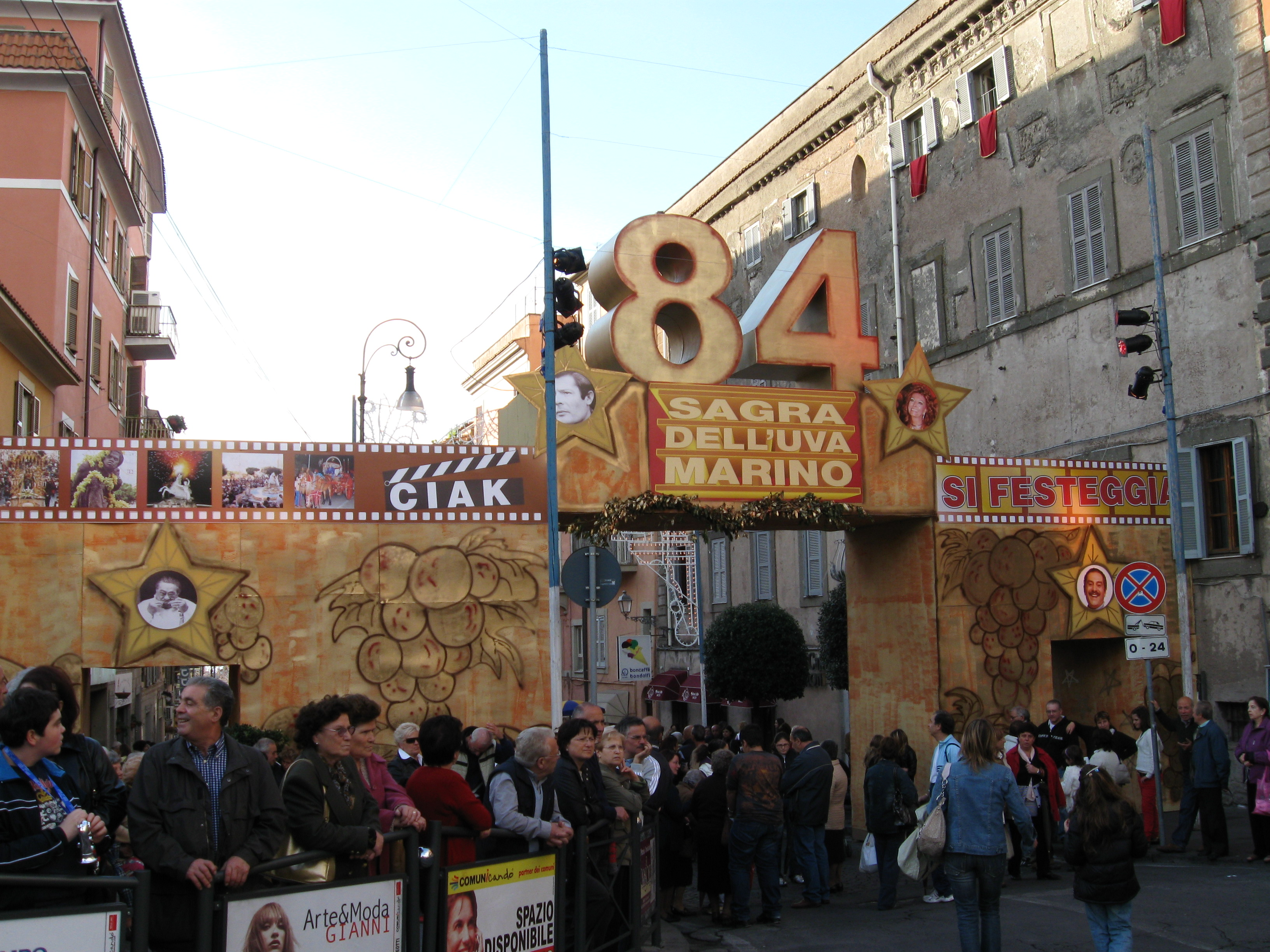
The fake arch made for the 2008 festival between Corso Trieste and Piazza Matteotti

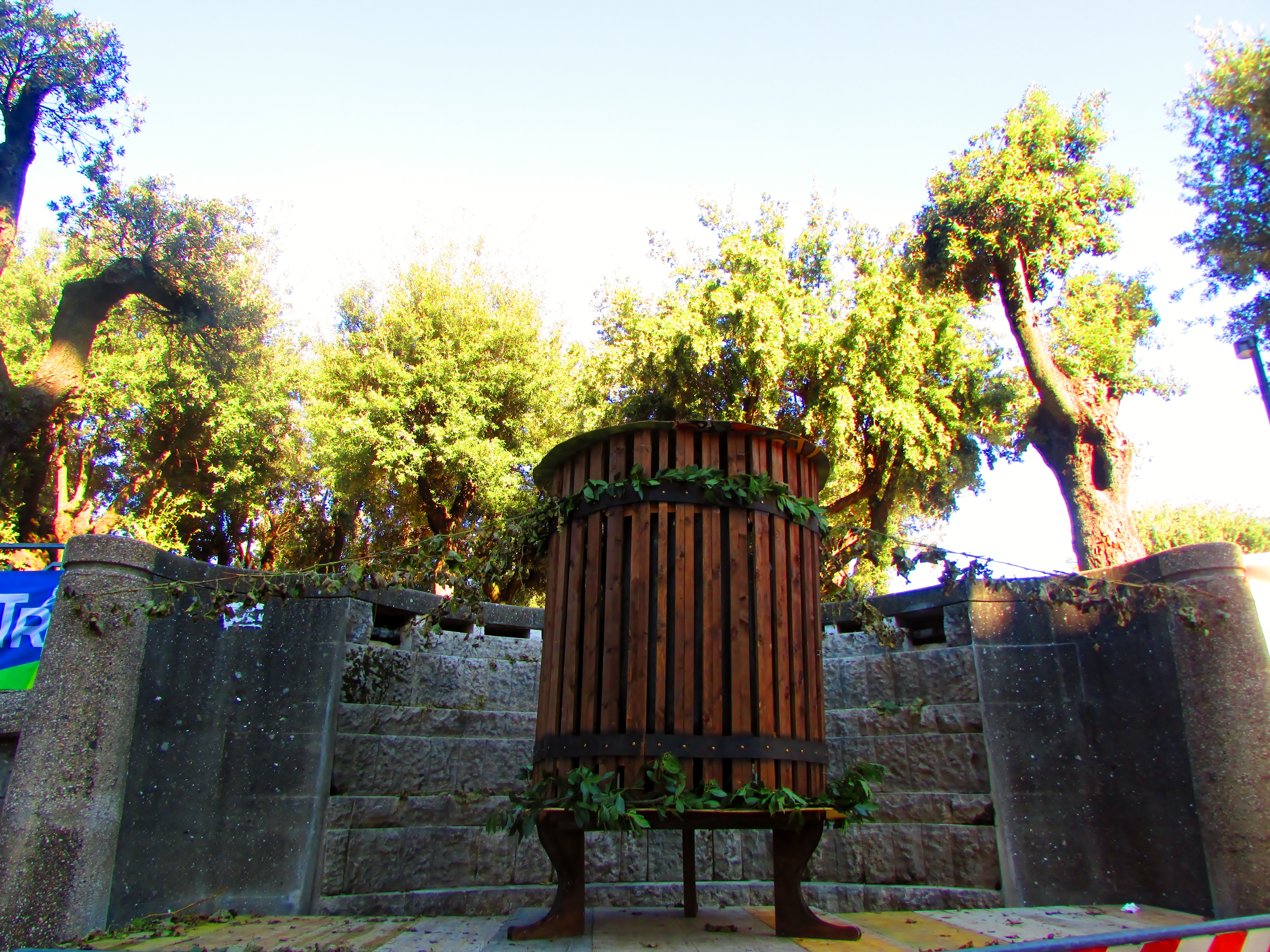
Fake winepress made for the 2014 edition to decorate the fountain in Corso Vittoria Colonna

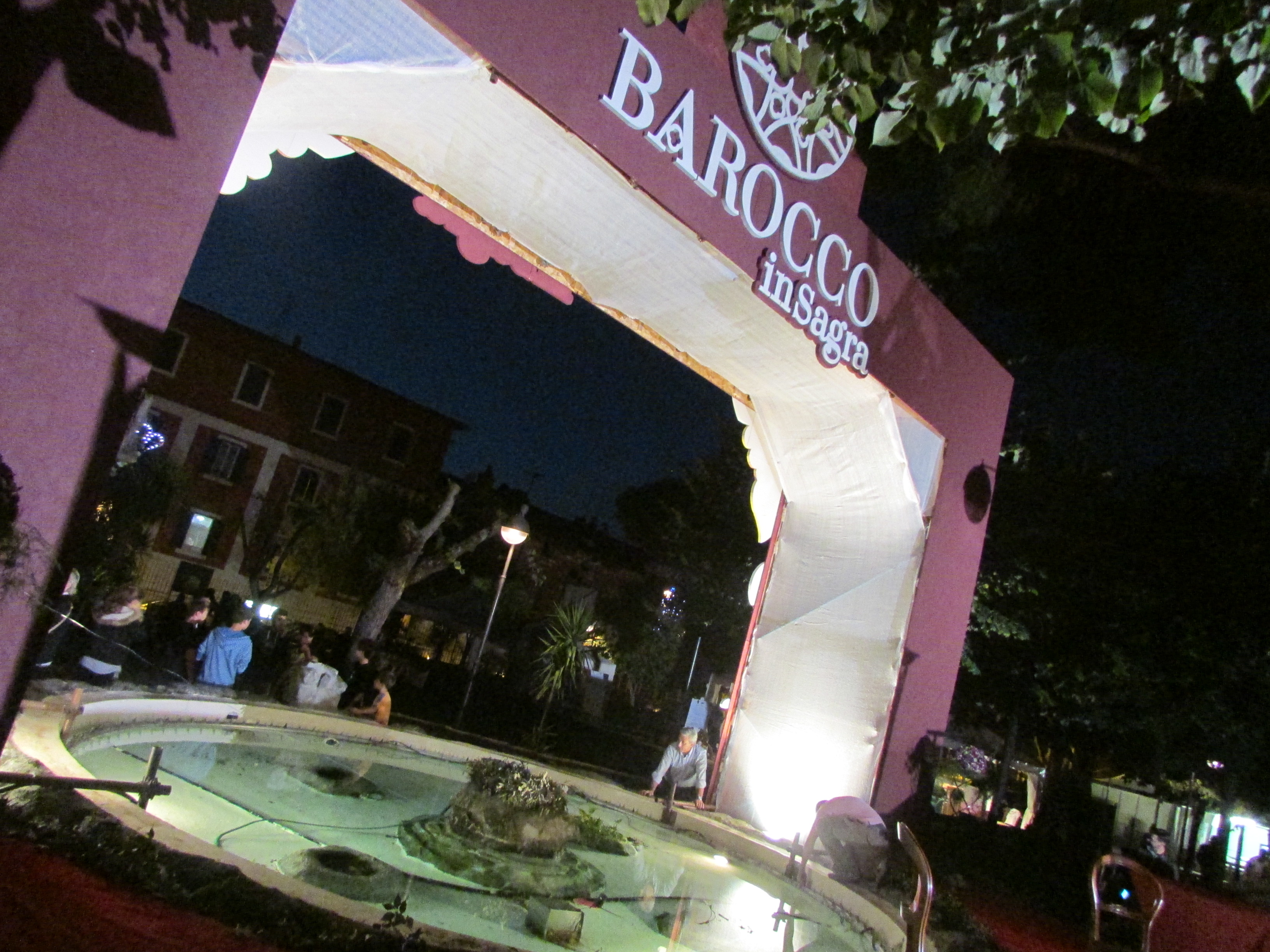
Installation of the fountain in Borgo Garibaldi for the 2014 festival

For the 76th edition of the Sagra dell'Uva, the poster was made by Gina Lollobrigida, patroness of the event. Prominent names in attendance on Sunday included the president of the Lazio Region Francesco Storace, the president of the Province of Rome Silvano Moffa, as well as the international presence of New York State Minister of Economic Development Charles Gargano.

In 2001 there was a historical fact: the Sagra, for the first time in its now long history, had to be moved by order of the prefect of Rome because of the constitutional referendum on federalism on Oct. 7. Therefore, the event was postponed to the second Sunday of the month, Oct. 14. The patroness of the seventy-seventh edition was Barbara Bouchet; the festivities lasted for over a week, until the following Sunday, Oct. 22. More than 200,000 attendees were estimated, including the newly appointed Deputy Prime Minister Gianfranco Fini on an official visit.

Rain partially ruined the seventy-ninth edition on Sunday, October 5, 2003, with Enzo De Caro and Flavia Vento participating in the historical costume parade. The newly appointed mayor Ugo Onorati announced that 146,597.56 euros had been spent.

On Sunday, October 3, 2004, the historic 80th edition of the Sagra was celebrated: eighty - one for each edition - cast-iron fountains were installed along Corso Trieste, which were supposed to spout wine at the appointed time for the "miracle of the fountains that spout wine." During the same edition, relations with the twinned European cities were re-established, with the proclamation of a new twinning with the Greek city of Nafpaktos. Festivities were also held in the hamlets of Marino.

In 2006 during the Sagra celebrations Hans Werner Henze, the German composer who had recently decided to settle in Marino, was awarded honorary citizenship of Marino.

In 2007, on Sunday, October 7, the eighty-third edition of the Sagra saw on the final evening a concert by Gigi d'Alessio in Piazza San Barnaba, at which a big screen was also mounted in Piazzale degli Eroi. The poster for this edition was created by Loredana Zelinotti.

On Sunday, October 5, 2008, the eighty-fourth edition of the Sagra dell'Uva was held, with the participation of comedian Roberto Ciufoli - as Marcantonio II Colonna during the historical procession on Sunday - and Enrico Montesano on Monday evening. On Saturday, Oct. 4, a delegation from the Spanish twin town of Paterna was received at Palazzo Colonna; the expense disclosed for the edition was around 70,000 euros, and attendance on Sunday afternoon was calculated at 80,000 people. The eighty-fourth edition would also go down in history for a notable incident: when making the wine flow out of the fountains on Sunday afternoon, the attendants made a mistake so that the wine for a few minutes flowed from the taps of the houses in the historic center and not from the Four Moors fountain. The mistake was widely reported in the national and even international press, so much so that the well-known British newspaper The Times devoted an article to the unusual episode:

A town where wine gushes from an ornate fountain in the main square is the ideal place to live for many people. But a town where it pours out of the taps and into the kitchen sink is a place not very far removed from heaven.

— Richard Owen, Bungling Italian authorities turn water into wine - The Times, October 8, 2008

The British Broadcasting Corporation, Britain's largest broadcaster, also spread the news of the "mistaken miracle."

=== 2010s ===
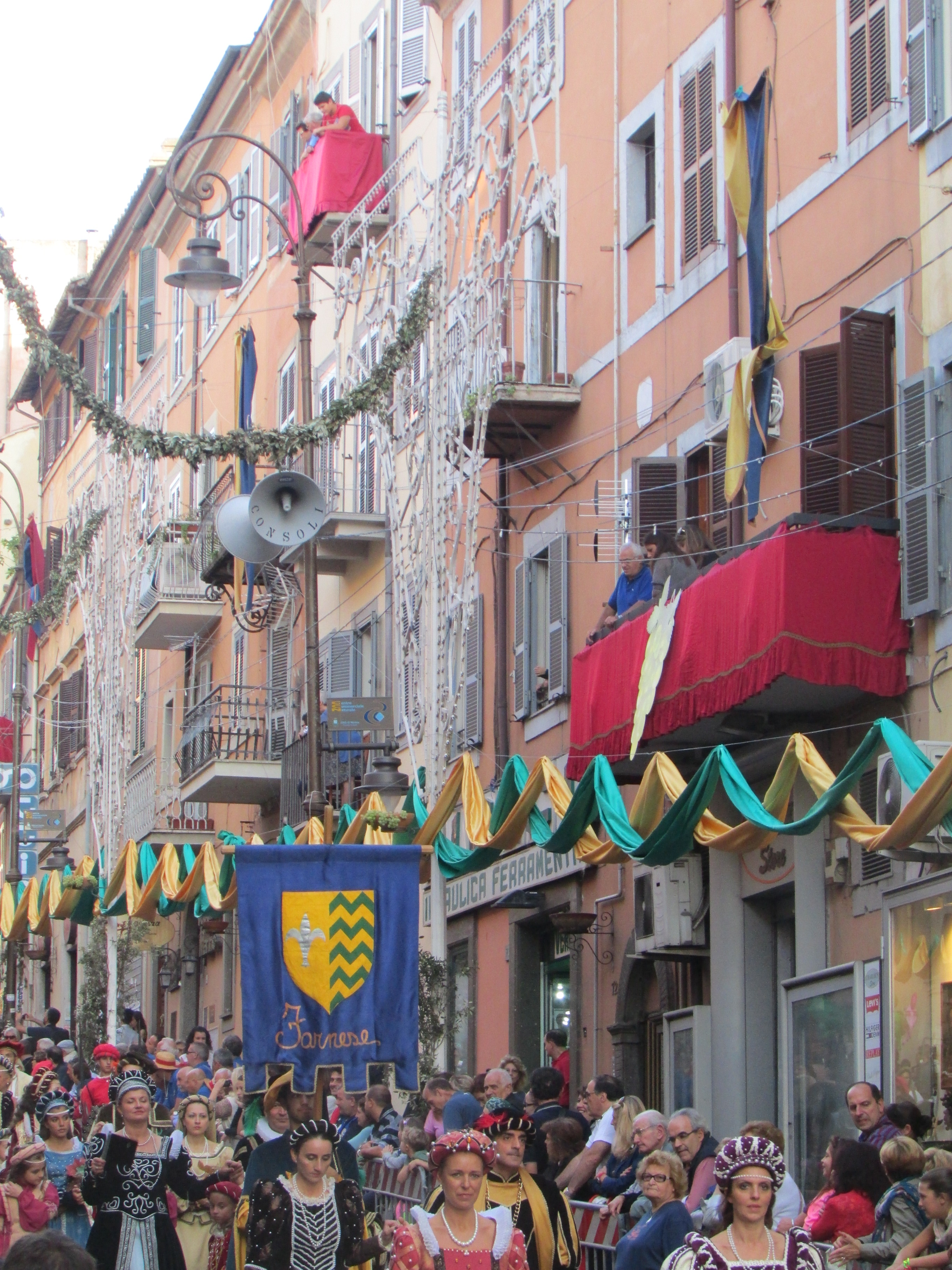
Detail of Corso Trieste during the historical parade (2014 edition)

The 86th edition was held Oct. 1-4, 2010. The religious procession was attended by several politicians, also in view of the March 2011 local elections: the president of the Lazio Region Renata Polverini (The People of Freedom), the president of the Province of Rome Nicola Zingaretti (Democratic Party), the vice-president of the Regional Council Luciano Ciocchetti (Union of the Centre) and the regional councilor Luca Malcotti, as well as the regional councilor Bruno Astorre. During the reception at Palazzo Colonna, the president of the Chamber of Deputies Gianfranco Fini, at the time coming back from the split of Future and Freedom from the People of Freedom and his break with Silvio Berlusconi, also made an appearance. The final show was animated by Fabrizio Corona and Valeria Marini.

The 2011 edition was held from September 29 to October 3. It featured Raimondo Todaro and Sara Santostasi in the roles of Marcantonio Colonna and Felice Orsini, Mario Biondi and Max Giusti in the Saturday and Monday entertainment nights.

The presentation of the 2012 edition took place at the National Museum of Popular Arts and Traditions in Rome, EUR. The grand final concert of the 88th Sagra was performed by Tiromancino. The following year (89th edition, October 4-7, 2013) an exhibition on the figures of the Servants of God Zaccaria Negroni and Guglielmo Grassi was held by the Pro Beatification Association. The evening concerts were those of Giuliano Palma and the orchestra of Zelig and Alex Britti.

For the 90th edition (Oct. 3-6, 2014) the poster was signed by Sicilian artist Turi Sottile, to whom an exhibition was dedicated at the Civic Museum. Scheduled events were those of Enrico Ruggeri, comedians Ale and Franz and Edoardo Bennato.

For the ninety-second edition (Oct. 1-3, 2016) the poster was designed by local artist Vito Lolli. A special logo for this edition was created by the consortium of productive excellence of the territory "Sua Eccellenza Marino," based on a design by Emiliano Fabi. For the closing concert on Monday night, the progressive rock group Banco del Mutuo Soccorso was called to perform. For the first time, the historical procession in 16th-century costumes was also presented in the streets of the hamlet of Santa Maria delle Mole on the afternoon of Friday, Sept. 30.

== Program ==
The program of the Marino Wine Festival is the result of eighty years of experiments and changes. Generally, for several years now, a set program is followed without making significant changes. The core of the festival is Sunday afternoon, with the secular recurrence and the "miracle," however, depending on changes in municipal juntas and economic availability, the festivities may begin a month earlier or not at all. In recent years, the festivities begin on Thursdays or Fridays and last no longer than the Monday of the "Sagretta," a custom desired by Marinese people as a less crowded replica of the much-loved festival. In addition to the Sunday events, there are other fixed events established on the Saturday of the eve and the Monday of the "Sagretta."

=== Saturday eve ===
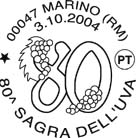
The illustrated postmark of the 80th edition (2004)

On the Saturday afternoon of the eve, usually around 6 p.m., through the streets of the historic center there is a historical re-enactment of the announcement of the Christian victory in the Battle of Lepanto on October 7, 1571. A herald on horseback, accompanied by trumpeters, drummers and flag-wavers, walks along Corso Vittoria Colonna and Corso Trieste reading the proclamation summoning the people in front of Palazzo Colonna. Then, people in 16th century costumes playing the governor and the notables of the feud appear at the balcony of the palace overlooking Piazza della Repubblica and announce the Christian victory and especially the victory of the feudal lord Marcantonio II Colonna, informing that the following day he will solemnly return to his feud.

In recent years, the tone of the proclamation has been made more peaceful, avoiding remarking on the enormous losses inflicted on the Turkish enemy and the number of prisoners captured, who nevertheless still proudly stand, carved in peperino, tied to the fountain of the Four Moors.

=== Festival Sunday ===
There, around the fountain of the Moors, a mad battle broke out, with unholy regurgitation, toward the spouts of free wine.
Waves of assault followed one after another uninterruptedly against the wall of the transfixed carabiniers, which provided the citadel with the free sparkling wine; swarms of paper mugs, fluttering in mid-air, pervaded the cupidity of the wine-gatherers; some happily took twenty-five, some thirty. Firmly planted wide-legged and tall on the fountain's own stronghold, the vanguardists surround it as if with a second and interior ammunition. They do the honors, hand the paper glass to the leading men of the assault phalanxes, splash some free sparkling wine on the heads of the carabiniers as well, given the difficulty of maneuvering in the storm. The new wine pours from the copper spouts, goes beyond the black and red cloth of the police force, the epaulettes, the silver chevrons, into the glasses: and ends amid coughs and sneezes half in the throat, half in the nose, half in the breeches, half in the waistcoat between the shirt and the skin of the people, who drink it and get soaked, driven back by elbowings saturated with folklore, with playful laughter and shouts, at times disappointed or happy.

— Carlo Emilio Gadda, La festa dell'uva a Marino, in Il castello di Udine (1934), pp. 151-152.

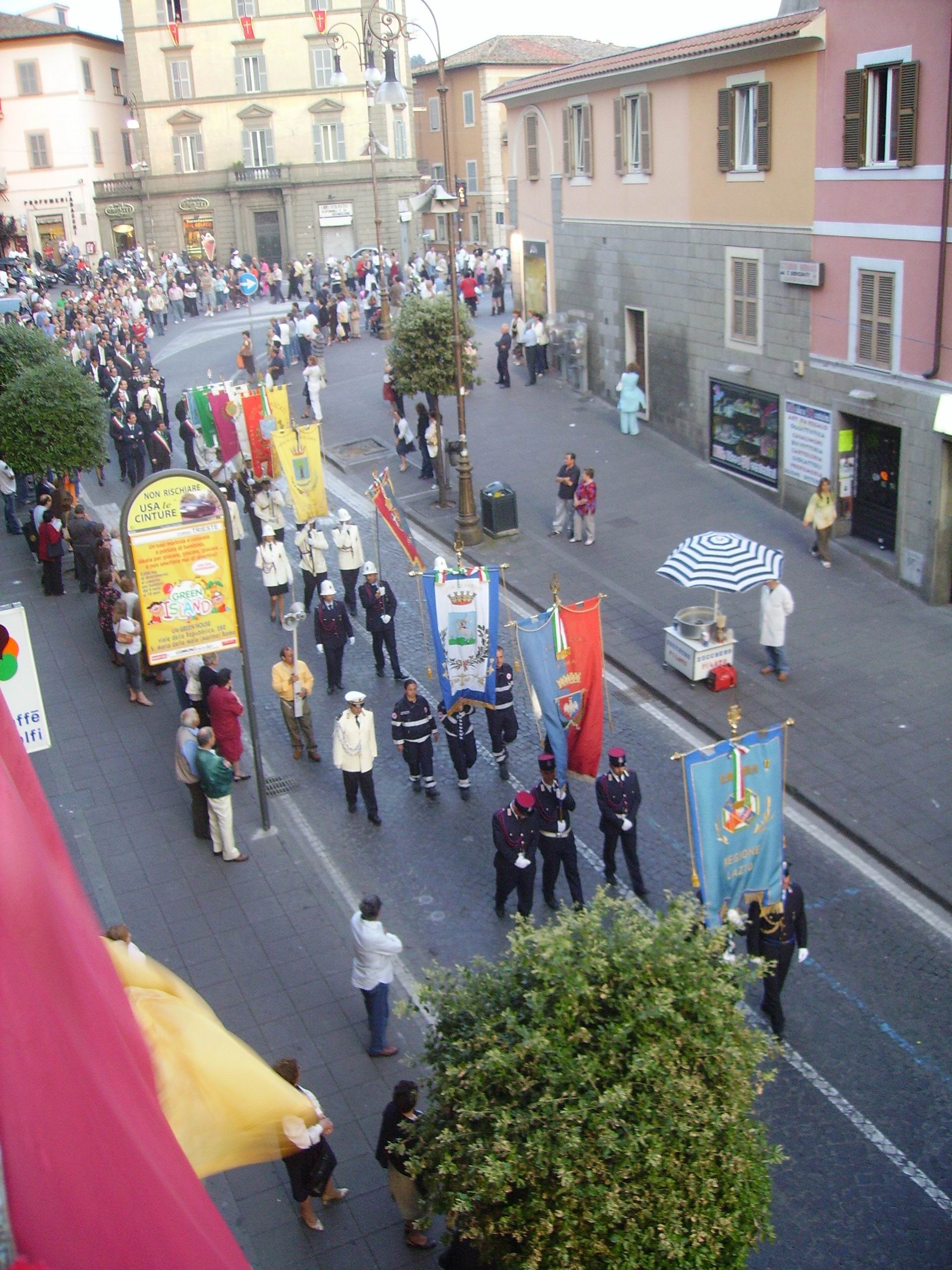
The procession of authorities with their respective banners during the religious procession in 2007

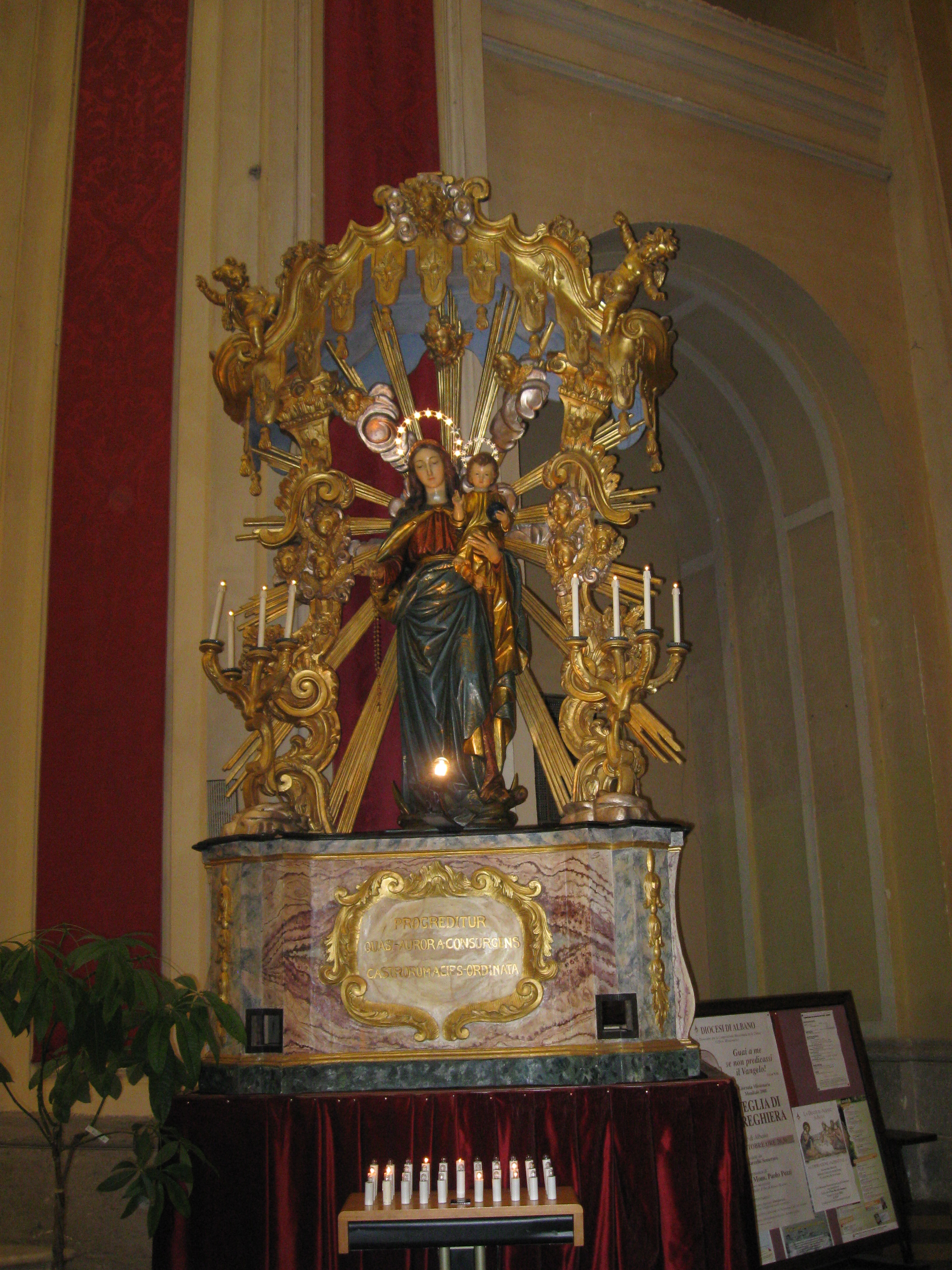
Our Lady of the Rosary displayed during the novena before the Feast, in the Basilica of St. Barnabas

Sunday is the focus and raison d'être of the Marino Wine Festival. All the most important and anticipated events are concentrated there, from the religious procession to the supplication to Our Lady of Pompeii, from the historical costume procession to the parade of floats and the "miracle of the fountains that spout wine."

==== Religious procession ====
On Sunday morning a solemn Mass is held in the basilica of St. Barnabas, presided over by the bishop of Albano and the abbot-parish priest. The religious service is attended by civil and military authorities, the mayor and representatives of neighboring or twinned municipalities.

At the end of the service, the procession in honor of Our Lady of the Rosary begins to unfold through the streets of the historic center. The members of the confraternities carry in procession two large 17th-century tapestries (to which two modern tapestries depicting Servants of God Zaccaria Negroni and Guglielmo Grassi have been added) and other objects of 17th- and 18th-century manufacture, while the members of the Sodality of Our Lady of the Most Holy Rosary to the cry of "Evviva Maria" carry on their shoulders, taking turns, the heavy processional machine of about 600 kilograms (1,300 lb), on which the wooden statue of Our Lady of the Rosary is raised. This custom, which is very tiring especially on steep or uphill stretches, was recently revived and made official with the establishment of the Sodality of Our Lady of the Most Holy Rosary in 2002.

The procession travels through all the main streets and squares of the historic center, namely Piazza San Barnaba, Via Roma, where there is the salute of the sodality to the "twinned" Madonna de u Sassu, Via Cavour, Matteotti and Corso Trieste, following a circular route that brings the procession back in front of the Basilica of San Barnaba for the supplication to Our Lady of Pompeii.

==== Supplication to Our Lady of Pompeii ====
From the throne of mercy, where you sit, Queen, turn, O Mary, your pitying gaze on us, on our families, on Italy, on Europe, on the world. Take compassion on the afflictions and travails that embitter our lives. See, O Mother, how many dangers in soul and body, how many calamities and afflictions trouble us.

— Text of the supplication to Our Lady of Pompeii.

Once the religious procession is back in St. Barnabas Square, in front of the Basilica of St. Barnabas, the bearers of the Confraternity of the Rosary place the statue of Our Lady of the Rosary on a small vehicle and the abbot-parish priest, in the presence of the authorities with the pennants of their respective institutions and the entire crowd, recites the text of the supplication to Our Lady of the Most Holy Rosary of Pompeii.

At the end of the recitation, children in traditional costume symbolically bring the statue a gift of wine and grapes on behalf of the entire Marinese community. Then, the bearers bring the statue back inside the Basilica, where it will remain for a few days on display beside the main altar. At this point, the religious celebration can be said to be over.

==== Historical procession ====
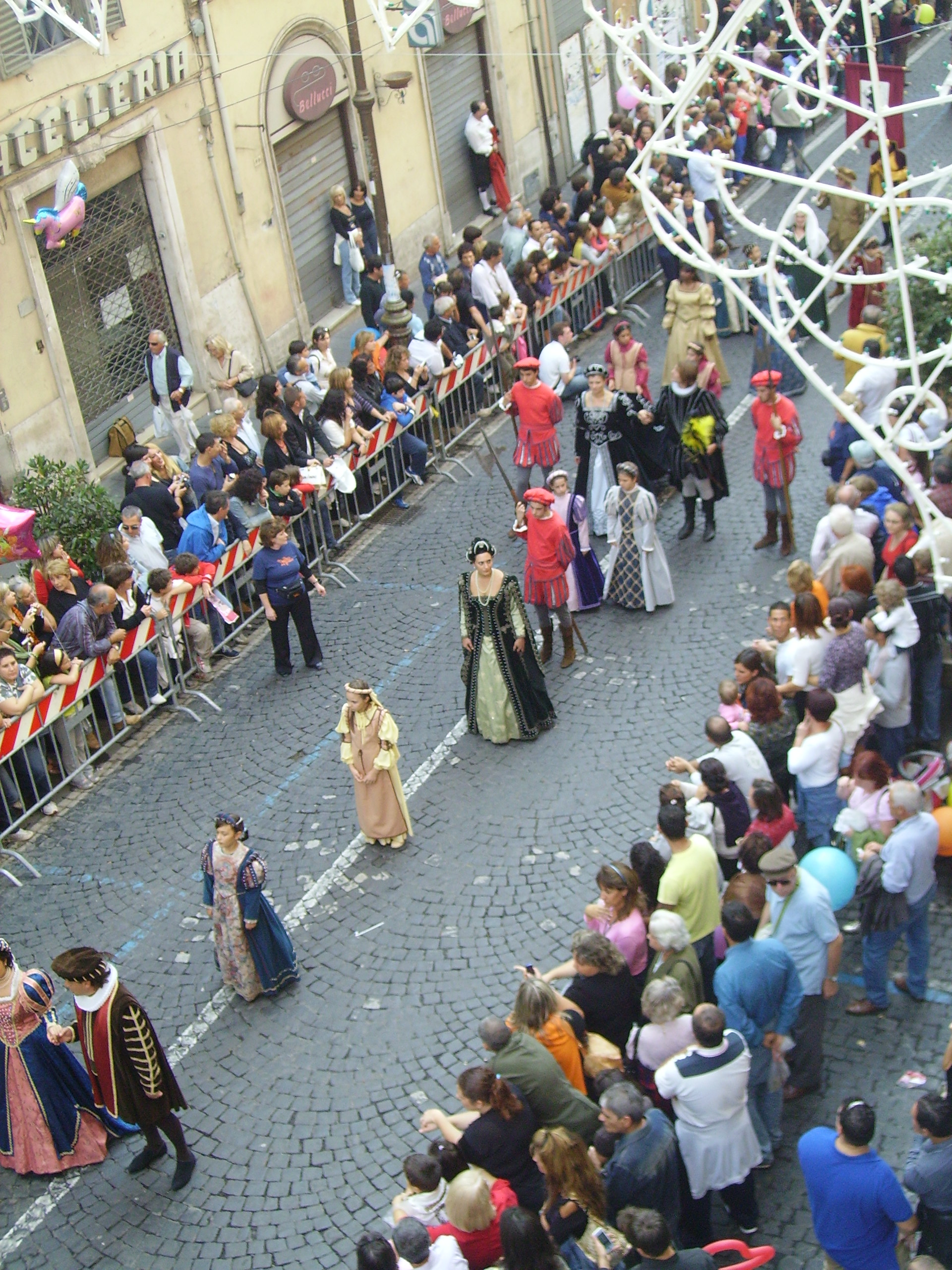
An image of the 2007 historical parade

In the early afternoon of Sunday, crowds of visitors and locals flock to the sides of Corso Vittoria Colonna and Corso Trieste in order to watch the historical parade in 16th-century costumes. The procession, first held in the 1929 edition at the initiative of Leone Ciprelli, was effectively revived starting in 1970 thanks to a number of volunteer associations that are responsible for making the valuable costumes and keeping them. Over the years, the richness of the wardrobe has grown exponentially, but so has popular participation. The most popular clothes are those of the nobility, while the traditional dress of simple commoners is less popular. Over the years, the event has been enriched by the participation of historical reenactment groups from other parts of Italy, such as the flag-wavers from Cori, the historical group of Certame from Popoli Terme and the slingers from Ischia.

The procession is supposed to retrace the triumphal entry of Marcantonio II Colonna, victor of the Battle of Lepanto, into his castle in Marino, and his first meeting with his wife Felice Orsini and their children, who during his absence resided precisely in Palazzo Colonna. The historical date of Marcantonio Colonna's entry into the castle is November 4, 1571: historical chronicles do not show any triumphal entry, and one can imagine the annoyance caused to the people of Marino by the bivouac of soldiers that Colonna had probably brought with him. The real triumphal entry of Marcantonio Colonna took place on December 4, 1571, in Rome, at the behest of Pope Paul V: as a Roman condottiere, Colonna entered through Porta San Sebastiano and arrived at the basilica of Santa Maria in Ara Coeli passing through the Roman Forum. A first critical remark about the historical procession was made as early as 1935 by the parish newspaper Il Campanile, which, on November 10, 1935, would have liked the historical procession to cover the distance between Marino and Rome, to be more faithful to the historical original.

In any case, the procession has been in recent years developed into two sections: the procession with Marcantonio Colonna and his retinue starts from the public park of Villa Desideri and runs along Corso Vittoria Colonna, while the procession of Felice Orsini and the nobility starts from Palazzo Colonna and runs along Corso Trieste. The two sections of the procession meet in Piazza Giacomo Matteotti, where the governor hands over the keys of the castle to his lord; a call for peace and brotherhood among peoples has been read by Marcantonio Colonna for a number of years, and then the reunited procession makes its way to Palazzo Colonna to receive the greetings of the authorities.

For the first time in 2016, the historical procession was repeated, in the form of a "war procession," along Via della Repubblica in Santa Maria delle Mole, the main street of the populous hamlet in the municipality of Marino, which is otherwise excluded from the festivities.

Among the most important appearances in the procession were the striking dresses of the nobility, especially those of the ladies. The robes of the Turkish prisoners have for some years had their chains removed and scimitars rendered back. Included in the procession are the local flag-waving groups Colonnae Signifer and Città di Marino. Generally, in line with the economic availability of municipal administrations, the part of Marcantonio Colonna and his consort Felice Orsini is played by nationally renowned actors and actresses: among others, Andrea Giordana (1998), Giuliano Gemma (1999), Orso Maria Guerrini (2000) and Enzo De Caro with Flavia Vento (2003), Ascanio Pacelli and his wife Katia Pacelli (2007), and Roberto Ciufoli (2008). Colonna's heavy armor was painted by sculptor Umberto Mastroianni.

==== Parade of floats ====
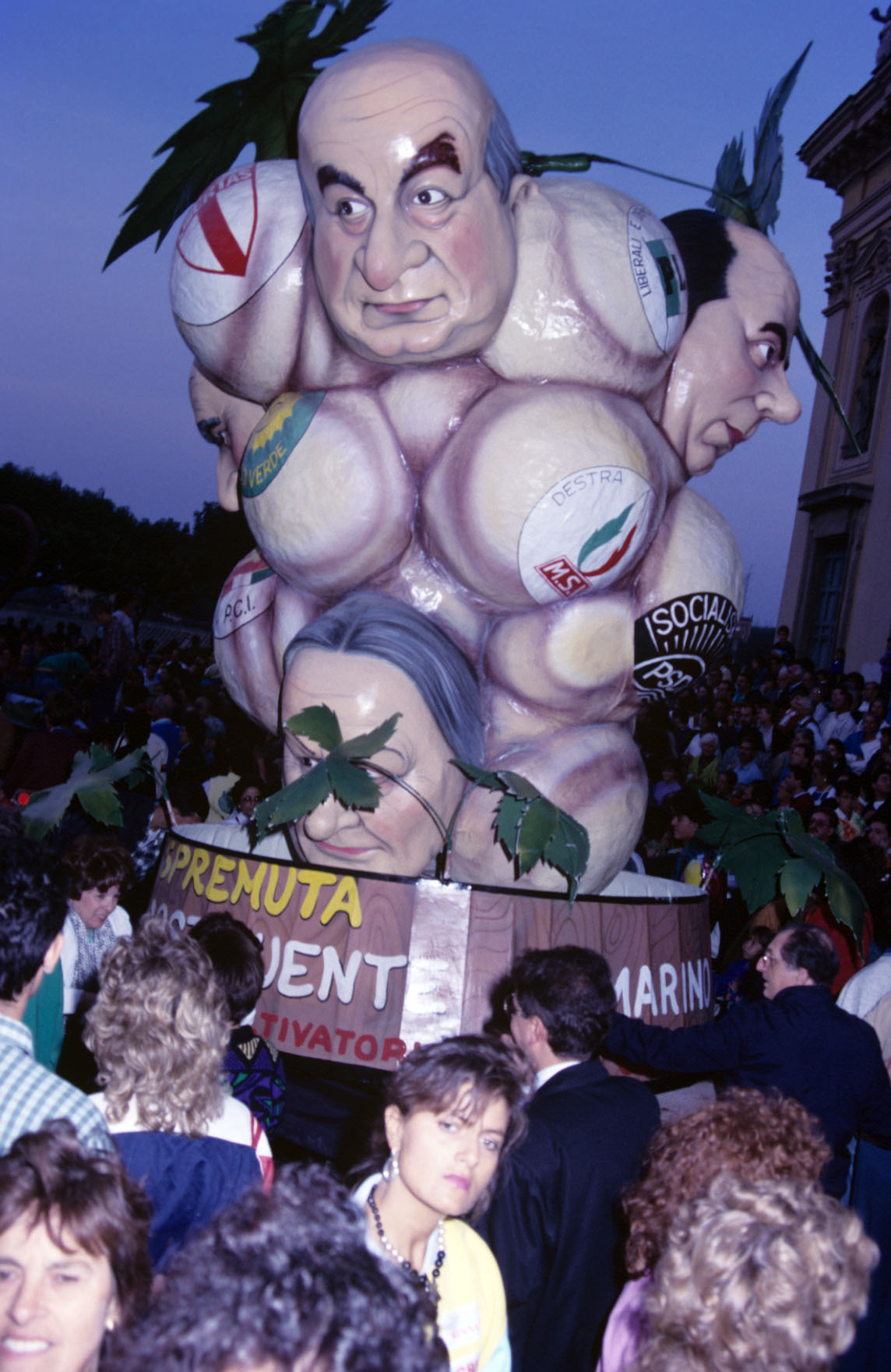
Float at the 1987 Festival

The parade of floats is the choreographic event that until the invention of the historical parade drew all the enthusiasm from organizers and visitors. In Marino, Carnival has always been carefully organized, especially by the strong anti-clerical side that organized the Carnevalone every Ash Wednesday, an event that drew thousands of people from the Roman Castles and Rome. The fascist regime, as soon as it came to power, saw fit to suppress this event, which was clearly republican and anti-fascist, but the same enthusiasm that was directed toward the Carnevalone was turned from 1925 to the parade of floats, a kind of autumn carnival.

Throughout the Fascist Festivals, the floats followed and developed a unique theme, which was either biblical - Noah's love of wine (1925), Moses touches the rock and wine comes out (1926) - or historical. Later, consistent with economic availability, massive floats were also made, but the initiative gradually waned over the years. Today only a few floats remain, organized by the Gotto d'Oro Social Winery or the St. Barnabas Parish Oratory, followed by the very few wine carts that remain in working order.

Along with the floats, the city bands also parade: the Enrico Ugolini Philharmonic Concert, the "Volemose Bene" Recreational Society and the "Ferentum" marching band, the only ones left of the many recreational societies that once performed during the festival.

==== The "miracle of fountains that spout wine" ====
Marinese fountains, on this occasion, are inexhaustible, because they are secretly connected to a mysterious wine cellar, a kind of wine spring, the location of which only the mayor knows.

— Il Lavoro Fascista, Monday, October 5, 1930.

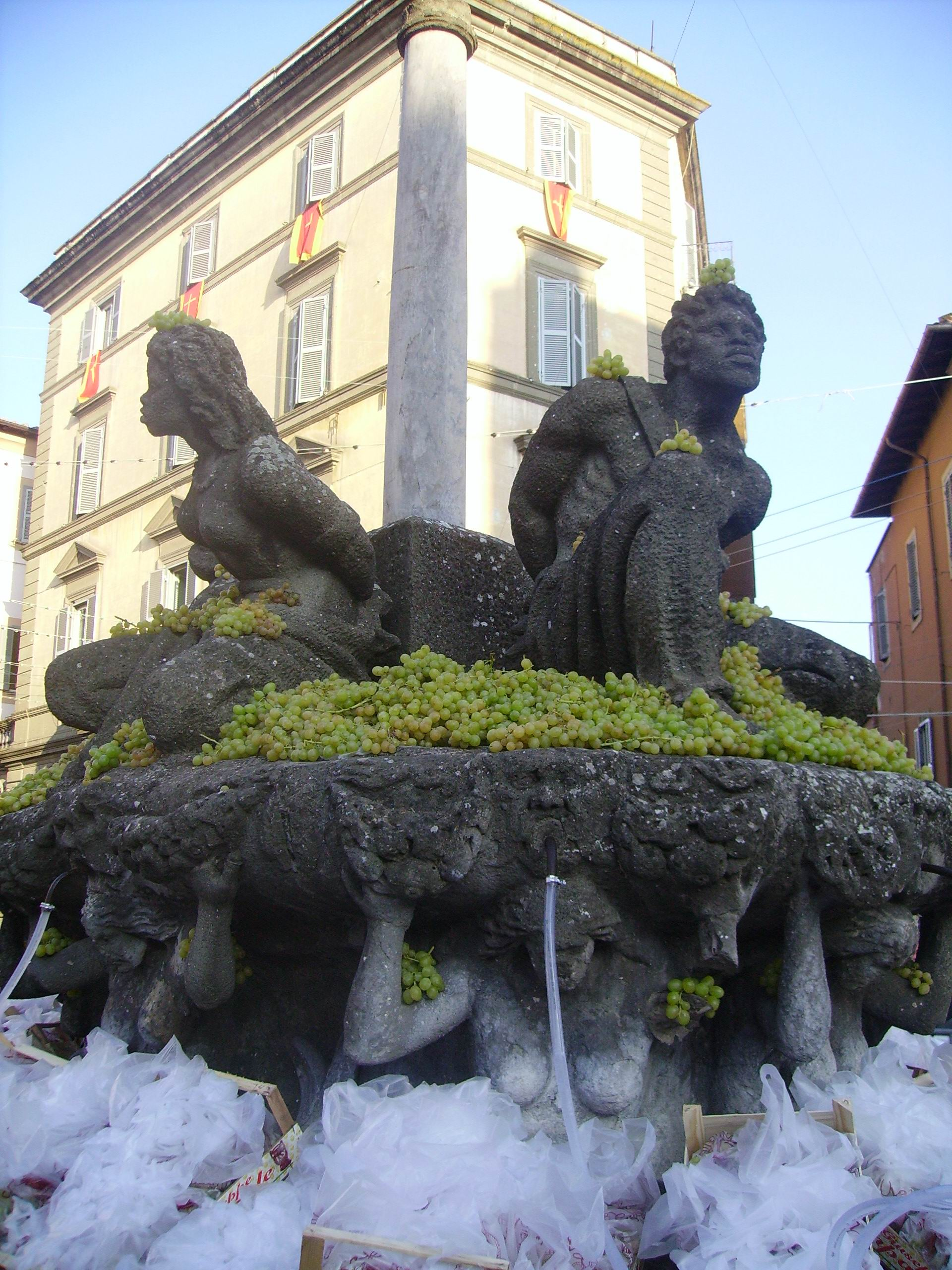
The fountain of the Four Moors decorated before the 2007 "miracle"

It is the fundamental event of the Sagra dell'Uva. The fact that the fountains spout wine instead of water is not something invented in Marino in 1925: in Rome already on two occasions, in 1644 for the election of Pope Innocent X and in 1670 for the election of Pope Clement X, the fountains at the base of the Capitoline steps spouted wine to the amazed crowd. In France, in the Alsatian town of Wangen, a fountain distributes wine every July 3. However, the "miracle" of Marino is the most famous in Italy.

Procedurally, the "miracle" is very simple: wine is made to flow in the pipes of the city fountains while the water supply is suspended. The fountain-symbol of the miracle is the fountain of the Four Moors (properly called "of the Slaves"), built in 1636 to a design by Pompeo Castiglia at the behest of Prince Filippo I Colonna, who wanted to commemorate the victory over the Turks achieved by his ancestor Marcantonio II Colonna: eight Turks or Moors, men and women, appear in the fountain, stripped naked and chained to a marble column, the heraldic symbol of the Colonna family.

However, for reasons of public order since the first edition of the event, the distribution takes place in several fountains: among the most important are the Triton fountain in Piazza San Barnaba, erected in 1889 to a design by Michele Tripisciano; the Fontanile Comunale, erected in the late 19th century along Via Castrimeniense; and the modern fountain built for the 1990 World Cup along the boundary wall of the Villa Desideri park in Corso Vittoria Colonna. Sometimes artificial fountains are erected in the streets: the last time happened in 2004, when a series of artificial "beverini" were placed along Corso Trieste.

Predictably, it can happen that there are people who get tipsy due to alcoholic excesses, and in the past there have sometimes been accidents, but never of such severity as to completely overshadow the festival. Therefore, in recent years a major deployment of law enforcement and security personnel is arranged.

==== The "vendemmiata" ====
The "vendemmiata" (grape harvest) is a tradition that has now practically fallen into decline at the Sagra dell'Uva: since the 1920s, wires were lowered from the balconies of Corso Trieste to which bunches of grapes were tied, which the crowd had to collect. Later, other variants of the "vendemmiata" were developed: the gathering of bunches of grapes from balconies or lower windows; for organizational purposes, today it is preferred to distribute the grapes from the wine distribution points.

=== Sagretta Monday ===
On the day following the Sunday of the Sagra proper, it has become customary, since after World War II, to replicate the secular festival program for a generally smaller audience. Obviously, the procession and supplication to Our Lady of Pompeii are not carried out, only the historical procession, however, without the participation of celebrities or foreign groups, the parade of floats and the "miracle of the fountains that spout wine."

This re-enactment of the Sagra in a more modest and "family-friendly" version is called "Sagretta," or "Sagra dei marinesi," and is now a fixture in the program of each edition.

On Monday evening there is a closing concert, usually in San Barnaba Square, and at the conclusion of the festival fireworks are shot off from the Domenico Fiore Municipal Stadium.

== See also ==
- Marino DOC
- Sagra (festival)
- Castelletto (district)

== Bibliography ==
- Lovrovich, Giovanni; Negroni, Franco (1981). Lo vedi ecco Marino. Marino: Tipografia Santa Lucia.
- Rufo, Vittorio (1991). Immagini di una città. Ciampino.
- Onorati, Ugo (2004). La Sagra dell'uva di Marino. Ciampino: Arti Grafiche Ciampino.
- Onorati, Ugo (2010). La basilica collegiata di San Barnaba apostolo. Marino.
- Rufo, Vittorio; Scialis, Edoardo (2014). Novanta Sagre dell'Uva tra storia arte e folklore: ottobre 1925 - ottobre 2014. Marino.
