= Marino dialect =

Dialect of Italian spoken in Marino

- Dialettu de Marini
- Native to: Italy
- Region: Marino, Lazio
- Native speakers: 30.000
- Language family: Indo-European: Italic; Latino-Faliscan; Latin; Romance; Italo-Western; Italo-Dalmatian; Italo-Romance; Central Italian; Romanesco; Central-Northern Latian; Dialects of the Roman Castles; Marino dialect
- Writing system: Latin

Language codes
- ISO 639-3: –
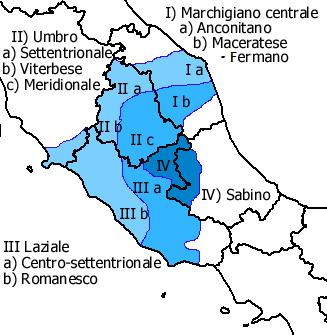

The Marino dialect is a dialect belonging to the dialects of the Roman Castles in the linguistic family of Central Italian and, specifically, the Central-Northern Latian dialect. It is spoken within the metropolitan city of Rome in the city of Marino and its territory in the Alban Hills.

Marino is located south of the "Ancona-Rome Line," an ideal dividing line drawn by glottologists to divide the northern Etruscan and Tuscan area of influence from the southern area, which remained tied to Sabine and Latin influence. Despite its long oral tradition, Marinese seems to be losing ground in favour of the Roman dialect, reduced more to "parlance" and the use of characteristic expressions, a phenomenon similar to all the Castellan dialects and those of centers in the southern quadrant of the metropolitan city of Rome and the Lazio coast.

The Marino dialect does not have legal recognition (Law No. 482 of 15 December 1999) nor is it regulated by a regulating body, but it was studied for the first time by the Marinese historian Girolamo Torquati in 1886, at the same time that a dictionary of the most frequently used words in the dialect was compiled.

== History ==
The first mention of the existence of the castle of Marino would date back to 1090, or at the latest to 1114: the fief had most likely belonged to the Counts of Tusculum, and then with their decline had come into the possession of the Frangipane: with the extinction of the latter, the castle was purchased in 1266 by Cardinal Matteo Rubeo Orsini and came into the orbit of the Orsini, in whose possession Marino remained until 1379. In that year, due to the Western Schism, a period of feudal anarchy began, which lasted until the election of Pope Martin V in 1417: in the same year, the pope's brother Giordano Colonna bought the castle of Marino, initiating the long period of Colonna rule.

Marino's importance throughout the Middle Ages was linked to its strong position close to the Ager Romanus, which made it a coveted first-class outpost on Rome. However, with the glory also came peril: the castle was besieged in 1267 and 1347, conquered in 1379, in 1385, in 1399, in 1405 (twice), in 1408 and 1413 (twice), in 1482, razed to the ground in 1501, sacked in 1526 and 1599. It was only at the end of this long period of local wars that ravaged Lazio that the Colonna family was able to devote itself to governing the fiefdom, carrying out during the seventeenth century important urban works and public works such as the Colonna palace, the basilica of San Barnaba, the fountain of the Four Moors, and Corso Trieste. In 1606 Pope Paul V elevated the fief to a duchy. By the early eighteenth century Marino had about 4,000 inhabitants, and was thus one of the most populous and wealthiest centers in the Alban Hills.

Immigration to Marino was fostered as early as the sixteenth century: Marcantonio II Colonna, the papal admiral who won the Battle of Lepanto in 1571, issued a decree on 26 December 1574, exempting any foreigner who wished to settle in his fief of Marino from paying any kind of tax for four years, provided that he swore an oath of allegiance. In 1656, the terrible plague epidemic that struck Rome and central-southern Italy decimated the population of Marino to such an extent that only seventeen families were left in the fiefdom: Duke Cardinal Girolamo Colonna incentivized repopulation by encouraging immigration from less economically vibrant areas of his domains, such as the Marsica fiefdom of Tagliacozzo or some of the Campagna and Marittima fiefdoms. An immigration from these areas and from other parts of Abruzzo and the eastern quadrant of the present province of Rome continued throughout the eighteenth century, but still in the early twentieth century there existed throughout the Roman Castles a seasonal immigration of peasant laborers employed for work in the vineyards, for a long time poorly paid and excluded from the conquests progressively obtained by local laborers. Many of these seasonal migrants settled permanently in Marino and the other Castellan centers, especially after the Second World War: this phenomenon, together with the increasingly disproportionate growth of Rome, the attraction of the Urbe or the factories of the Pontine Marshes, have determined a frenetic development that has occurred in the last thirty years of new urban expansions in the historic centers and the birth of new centers.

Marino has had to deal with the birth of Ciampino, the "garden city" founded in 1919 for veterans of World War I and made autonomous from the municipality in 1974, and with the birth of the hamlets of Santa Maria delle Mole, Frattocchie, and Due Santi, whose autonomy drive was curbed by the constitutional court in 1995 after the experience of the autonomous municipality of Boville. The origin of the "new Marinese" is varied: people from Veneto, Romagna, Abruzzo, Naples, Sardinia, Basso Lazio, Apulia and Calabria, and Sicily, alongside Romans who fled the metropolis. Since the mid-1990s, the flow of foreign immigrants began: in 2007 there were 2331 foreign citizens living in Marino, with the largest Albanian community in the Roman Castles (300 people) and over 600 Romanians.

== Origins and development ==
The Marino dialect was formed along with the castle and its growing population: the most intense wave of immigration that might have affected the dialect the most was the one following the plague of 1656.

There are no written records in the Marinese dialect prior to the twentieth century: however, the first scholar to deal with the Marinese dialect was the historian Girolamo Torquati in his publication "Origine della lingua italiana: dall'attuale dialetto del volgo laziale al dialetto del popolo romano nel secolo XIII e da quest'ultimo dialetto a quello della plebe latina nell'età della Repubblica e dell'Impero. Investigazioni filologiche del cavalier Girolamo Torquati," a four-hundred-page work printed in Rome in 1886. The purpose of the book, which was written, according to the author, "as a relief from more serious studies," is to demonstrate that "the apparently strange diction of the Marinese dialect is indigenous, and urban, and has no flavor of foreignness," and consequently "that the Marinese dialect, which was already the Roman dialect of the 13th, 14th and 15th centuries, is formally the vernacular language of the ancient Romans." Torquati demonstrates this by first providing an extensive explanation of the strangest morphological, phonological and grammatical forms of the Marinese dialect (Chapter I), then expounding a dictionary of particular Marinese words by juxtaposing them with the corresponding Italian words (Chapter II), then comparing these to the words used in the "Chronicle" of the Roman Anonymous, thus to the Roman dialect of the early fourteenth century: and from there he arrives at the conclusion as to what the original Latin language was like.

== Literature ==
As far as the work in Marino dialect is concerned, it consists mainly of plays, written beginning with the opening after World War I of Marino's first theater, the "Auditorium Monsignor Guglielmo Grassi" (so named in 1954, after the death of the abbot-parish priest who ordered its opening, Guglielmo Grassi) located in the premises of the former Coroncina Oratory under the basilica of St. Barnabas. Among the most prominent writers in the Marino dialect are Roberto Di Sante, with some very successful musical comedies such as "E tira a campà" (written with Mario Galbani in 1982), "Cariolacciu", "Bonu 'spidale" and "C'era 'na vorta a guera", Peppe De Filippis ("Incontru de do' compari"), Castro Meneri ("In Pretura") and Remo ("U viaggiu de i do' combari"). On the occasion of the Marino Wine Festival there are also exhibitions in the Marino dialect.

== Lexicon ==
Most of the characteristic words of the Marinese dialect come directly from the Latin language, a fact that led Girolamo Torquati to argue for a continuity between the "language of the ancient Romans" and the Marinese dialect.

== Phonetics ==
- Replacement of the "l" by the "r"

In the Marino dialect, it is worth noting a phenomenon that is also very characteristic of the Roman dialect, namely the substitution of the consonant "l" for the consonant "r" in pronunciation, so that instead of the standard Italian forms "splendente", "coltello", "plebe" and "moltiplicare", one says "sprendente", "cortello", "prebe", "mortipricare". This phenomenon is very old and contradicts the practice of some writers, such as the Sienese novelist Pietro Fortini, of substituting the "r" for the "l". This substitution also occurs in proper nouns: "Gloria" becomes "Groria", "Clemente" becomes "Cremente", and so on.

- Dropping the "l" in the middle of words

Another Marinese phenomenon is the dropping of the "l" in the middle of a word when it is followed by "z," "s," "i," or "c": so that there will be the dialectal pronunciation "cazone" (instead of "calzone"), "cazetta" (instead of "calzetta"), "coto" (instead of "colto"), "atro" (instead of "altro"). On the other hand, this usage already appears in the "Chronicle" of the Roman Anonymous dating from the early fourteenth century: in this case, however, the "l" is replaced by an often silent "i" (e.g., "voize," "toize," "aitro"). In addition, a different outcome of the dropping of the "l" may be the substitution with the "vi" group, and in Marinese one has "cavicio" ("calcio"), "sevice" ("selce"), "scavizo" ("scalzo").

- Assimilation of the consonantal group "nd"

In the presence of the consonantal group "nd" ("bando," "ghirlanna," "risponde") the Marinese, but also the Romans and a large part of the Castellan population, underwent an unconscious process of assimilation from "nd" to "nn": hence one would have "banno," "ghirlanna," "risponne," a fact already attested in the aforementioned "Chronicle" of the Roman Anonymous.

== Morphology and syntax ==
=== Adjectives and nouns ===
Ending in "-u"

The most important phenomenon in the formation of nouns and adjectives in the Marinese dialect is the presence of the termination "-u" instead of "-o," a phenomenon equally present in other dialects of the Roman Castles, such as in Rocca di Papa and Genzano di Roma. This is a phenomenon typical of the southern parts of Lazio, of the "Sabine" area south of the aforementioned "Rome-Ancona" demarcation line.

Girolamo Torquati asserts that the termination in "-u" by truncation of the "s" and "m" ending already existed in the Latin language, bringing numerous examples, from Marcus Fabius Quintilianus ("serenu' fuit et dignu' loco") to Marcus Tullius Cicero ("egregie cordatus homo Catus Eliu' Sextus"). Hence he goes on to infer that the Roman people nipped the final consonant "s" or "m" and from this they obtained most of the vernacular and later Italian words ("focus" > "focu" > "fuoco," "vinum" > "vinu" > "vino"): the Marinese dialect would thus preserve the words without the transformation of "u" into "o" that occurred in the early centuries of Italian literature.

Mutation of the "i" to an "e"

In proparoxytone words (i.e., with an accent on the third last syllable) with the ending "-ile," the Marinese dialect changes the "i" to "e": for example, "orribile" becomes "orribele," "nobile" becomes "nobele," "terribile" becomes "terribele." It is not known why this is the case, although there are parallel forms in Italian literature. This transformation is also possible in words such as "principe" (which becomes "prencipe") and "lingua" (which becomes "lengua").

However, the transformation of "i" into "e" also appears in the first syllable of some words, especially beginning with "ri," including "ringrazia" (which becomes "rengrazia"), "rimedio" (which becomes "remedio"), "rifugio" (which becomes "refugio").

Apheresis of "i"

In Marinese there is also the apheresis of the letter "i" when it is found at the beginning of a word and is followed by "m," "n," or "l": e.g. "mperatore" for "imperatore," "nganno" for "inganno," "n tra noa" for "in tra noi," "nnanzi" for "innanzi."

Replacement of "o" by "u"

Very frequent is the substitution of the vowel "o" for the vowel "u": e.g. "onto" for "unto," "ogna" for "ugna," "onguento" for "unguento."

Exchange of "b" - "v"

Exchange between "b" and "v" is also possible, which is also characteristic of southern Italian dialects: e.g. "bivo" or "vivo," "brace" or "vrace," "votte" or "botte," "vocca" or "bocca."

"Dissolution" of "c"

The consonant "c," when found before a vowel or in other particular positions, "dissolves" into the consonantal group "sc": for example, "bascio" for "bacio," "cascio" for "cacio," "camiscia" for "camicia."

Replacement of the "t" by the "d"

It is not unusual to find a swap between the consonant "t" and the consonant "d," as for example in "patre" for "padre," "patrone" for "padrone," "latrone" for "ladrone," "matre" for "madre": in Marinese, this exchange is more reminiscent of the original Latin words, such as "patronus", "pater" and "mater".

Conditioned diphthong "io"

This diphthong is characteristic of southern Lazio, especially of Velletri, the Roman Castles and the Latin Valley, and reappears in the Lazio localities that were longer subject to the domination of the Kingdom of Naples. In the immediate vicinity of Rome, the influence of the Romanesco dialect, closer to the Tuscan dialect than to the southern Italian dialects, is erasing this peculiarity as well as many others, which nonetheless still existed at the end of the 19th century.

The use of the conditioned diphthong consists of inserting it in the last syllable of words ending in "no" and "ro," so that as a result we have "monasterio " from "monastero" and "capitanio" from "capitano."

=== Articles ===
All Italian articles exist in the Marinese dialect, but the use of the article "lo" in place of the article "il" is more frequent: for example "lo brodo" instead of "il brodo," "lo vino" instead of "il vino," in the manner of many ancient authors such as Dante Alighieri and Giovanni Boccaccio. Conversely, very often "lo" becomes "lu."

=== Personal pronouns ===
Personal pronouns	Singular	Plural
1st person	io (I)	noa (We) noatri (The rest of us)
2nd person	tu (You)	voa (You) voatri (The rest of you)
3rd person	illu / issu (He) illa / issa (She)	illi / issi (They, feminine) ille / isse (They, masculine)

The personal pronoun with object function can be attached to the adjective it is going to specify, in a very peculiar usage also characteristic of southern Italian dialects and of the Roman dialect. Hence we have “patrimu,” “fratimu,” “suorima,” “matrima,” “mogliema,” and “maritimu,” to say “my father,” “my brother,” “my sister,” “my mother,” “my wife,” and “my husband,” respectively. As already mentioned, this usage is not exclusive to the Marinese dialect, but also appears in several classical authors such as Pietro Bembo (“patremo,” “matrema”), Iacopone da Todi (“maritoto”) and Giovanni Boccaccio (“mogliema”).

Another feature of personal pronouns attributed to the Marinese dialect, but also to the neighbouring north-central Lazio dialects of the province of Frosinone, is the addition of an "n" to the pronoun itself: e.g. "mene" for "to me" or simply "I", "tene" for "to you" or simply "you". In fact, this, perhaps added in ancient times for metrical reasons in the composition of folk songs, can also accompany verbs ("fane" for "does", "saline" for "goes up").

=== Verbs ===
==== Indicative ====
===== Present =====
The ending of the first person plural of the present indicative ends in “-emo,” unlike the common form in the Italian language, which is “-iamo”: e.g., “ponemo,” “avemo,” “dicemo,” “facemo,” instead of the forms “poniamo,” “abbiamo,” “diciamo,” “facciamo.” The form in "-emo" is closer to the original Latin derivation: "ponemo" > "ponemus", "avemo" > "habemus", "dicemo" > "dicemus", "facemo" > "facemus", while the corresponding Italian form shows a greater morphological elaboration that has occurred over the centuries, as several Italian authors from the first centuries of vernacular use attest to the "-emo" form, from Bartholomew of San Concordio to Luigi Pulci.

The second person plural of the present indicative has a '-cete' ending that differs from the '-te' ending in Italian: e.g. 'benedicete', 'dicete', 'facete' instead of 'benedite', 'dite', 'fate'. In this case, too, the dialect form "-cete" is kept closer to the Latin original ("benedicéte" > "benedícite", "dicéte" > "dicíte", "facéte" > "facíte") and, moreover, it seems to be already rooted in the literature of the first centuries of the vernacular, since it also appears in the "Canticle of Creatures" of St. Francis of Assisi.

===== Present perfect =====
In the present perfect, the peculiarity of the Marinese dialect, inexplicable in the words of Girolamo Torquati himself, is that the apocope of the past participle enters into the composition with the auxiliary "to have": for example, "ho beto" for "ho bevuto", "ho trovo" or "ho troto" for "ho trovato", "ho cerco" for "ho cercato". Another peculiarity is that the auxiliary "to be" and the auxiliary "to have" are interchangeable, i.e. it is possible to say "so beto" ("I have drunk") or "so magnato" ("I have eaten"), which is impossible in Italian. A similar usage can only be found in the work of Feo Belcari, a 15th-century Florentine religious poet.

===== Imperfect =====
For verbs of the first conjugation (ending in "-are"), in the third person singular of the indicative imperfect, the ending is "-eva" instead of "-ava", which is the case in Italian: hence we have "ameva" and "gusteva" instead of "amava" and "gustava": in this case it is the Marinese dialect that deviates from the original Latin, since Italian is more closely related to "amabat" and "gustabat". The "-eva" form is not only local, as it also appears frequently in Dante Alighieri's "Divine Comedy".

===== Preterite =====
For the third person singular of the preterite there is a special form ending with "-one" instead of "-ò", with an "n" added to the final "e": "digiunone" instead of "digiunò", "magnone" instead of "magnò", "andoone" instead of "andò", and so on. This form is an extension of the "-òe" form already attested in the "Florentine Lenten" of Jordan of Pisa ("digiunòe", "commandòe").

Three particular phenomena occur in the third person plural of the indicative past tense: syncope (which was already present in Latin in several persons, see for example "laudere" > "lauderis"), the transformation of the vowel of the penultimate syllable, and the mutation of the consonant of the last syllable. For example, in the Marinese dialect we have "arrivorno" instead of "arrivarno", which in turn replaces "arrivarono", "bussorno" instead of "bussarno", which is the contraction of "bussarono", "cercorno" for "cercarno" instead of "cercarono", or more simply "miseno", which is the simple variant of "misero", and "strinseno" for "strinsero". Similar syncopated and mutated forms are also used by several classical authors, such as Luigi Pulci ("arrivorno"), Giovanni Villani (“posono”) and Giovanni Boccaccio (“feciono”).

===== Simple future =====
In the first person singular of the simple future, two forms are possible: 'òe' ('faròe', 'diròe') and '-ggio' ('faraggio', 'avraggio'), the latter closely related to the '-jo' form ('avrajo', 'farajo'), which is currently the most common in the Marinese dialect. The result of the intervocalic "j" (or "i") in "gg" is also known and evident in several Latin words that have entered Italian, such as "maior" ("greater"), "peior" ("worse"), "maius" ("may").

==== Conditional ====
===== Present =====
In the present conditional, the first person singular in Italian should take the ending "-ei" ("andrei", "canterei", "suonerei"), but the Marinese dialect sets the ending to "-ia" ("andria", "canteria", "suoneria"), as it appears in many authors of the first centuries of Italian literature, from Giovanni Boccaccio ("saria") to Iacopone da Todi (”vorria").

In the third person singular and plural of the same present conditional, a similar divergence occurs: instead of the Italian endings "-ebbe" for the singular and "-ebbero" for the plural, the Marinese say "-ia" and "-ieno" ("sarebbe" becomes "saria" and "sarebbero" becomes "sarieno").

==== Conjunctive ====
===== Imperfect =====
Another peculiarity appears in the third person plural of the imperfect subjunctive in the Marinese dialect (the endings '-ino' and '-ono' are still used, which are archaic for Italian, which adopts '-ero': e.g. 'vivessino' instead of 'vivessero', 'fussino' instead of 'fossero').

==== Infinitive ====
===== Present =====
When the present infinitive of a verb is combined with a third-person singular pronominal particle ("lo", "la"), the Marinese dialect omits the final "e" in the same way as Italian, but, unlike Italian, it also changes the preceding "r" to "l": for example, "fare la" becomes "falla" (> "farla"), "avere la" becomes "avella" (> "averla").

Moreover, in the spoken dialect it is very common for the infinitive to lose the last syllable "re" by apocope, even without entering into composition with anything: we have "bisogna fa'", "bisogna di'", "va a magna'", all forms which are also characteristic of the Roman dialect and which have now entered into common usage in other parts of Italy. The origin of this truncation, which can be found in some Sabine and Roman folk songs, is probably metrical.

==== The verb “to be” ====
Present indicative	Singular	Plural
1st person	So' (I am)	Essimo (We are)
2nd person	Si' (You are)	Sete (You are)
3rd person	So' (He/She is)	Enno (They are)

Other special forms of the verb "to be" include the variants "enno" for the first person singular of the present indicative ("sono") and "ene" or "ee" for the third person singular of the same tense ("è"), "essimo" for "eravamo" in the first person plural of the imperfect indicative, "si'" for "sia" in the second person singular of the present subjunctive, "seravo" or "saravo" for the third person plural of the simple future ("saranno"), "fussi" for "fossi", "fussino" for "fossino" and "fussimo" for "fossimo" in the preterite and present subjunctive. Many of these forms can also be found in classical authors of Italian literature, such as Iacopone da Todi ("so'"), St Francis of Assisi in the Canticle of the Creatures ("si'"), in the Florentine Lenten of Jordan of Pisa, and in Giovanni Boccaccio.

== See also ==
- Marino, Lazio
- Roman Castles

== Bibliography ==
- Torquati, Girolamo (1886). Origine della lingua italiana: dall'attuale dialetto del volgo laziale al dialetto del popolo romano nel secolo XIII e da quest'ultimo dialetto a quello della plebe latina nell'età della Repubblica e dell'Impero. Investigazioni filologiche del cav. Girolamo Torquati. Rome: Mario Armanni.
- Lorenzetti, Luca (1988). I dialetti dei Castelli Romani: ipotesi sull'origine delle differenze, in Documenta Albana, 10. pp. 84–96.
- Lorenzetti, Luca (1993). Evoluzione dialettale e variabilità linguistica nei Castelli Romani, in Contributi di filologia dell'Italia mediana, 7. pp. 171–191.
- Lorenzetti, Luca (1995). Aspetti morfologici e sintattici dei dialetti dei Castelli Romani. Rome.
- Lorenzetti, Luca (2004). Un decennio di studi linguistici sui dialetti del Lazio: bilanci e prospettive, in Le lingue der monno, a cura di C. Giovanardi e F. Onorati, atti del convegno di Roma del 22-25 novembre.
- Trifone, Pietro (2008). Storia linguistica di Roma. Rome.
- Lorenzetti, Luca (2008). Note a margine dell'Origine della lingua italiana di Girolamo Torquati (1885), in Bollettino di italianistica, 5. pp. 28–44.
- Tufi, Stefania (2014). Il dialetto di Marino tra passato e presente. Marino.
- Tomassetti, Giuseppe; Tomassetti, Francesco (1910). La Campagna Romana antica, medioevale e moderna IV. Turin: Loescher.
- Devoti, Luigi (1999). I Castelli Romani. Storia e descrizione in breve dei 14 comuni dei Castelli Romani. Rome.
- Mancini, Ugo (2009). Storia del Novecento. Emmebi Edizioni Firenze.
- Onorati, Ugo (2004). San Barnaba Apostolo nella storia e nelle tradizioni di Marino. Marino: Tipografica Renzo Palozzi.
- Gregorovius, Ferdinand (1894). The History of Rome in the Middle Ages.
