= Pro Loco =

Italian volunteer groups

In Italy, Pro Loco are grass-roots organizations that seek to promote some particular place, almost always a town and its immediate area. Pro loco is a Latin phrase literally meaning "for the local".

Usually, the town is a full-fledged comune, but not always: frazioni and other small places with a high level of civic pride may have their own Pro Loco. The name of a town's Pro Loco is just "Pro Loco N", where N is the name of the town; not infrequently, though, one meets with the simpler "Pro N", where N may be the name of the town or even its ancient Roman name.

Pro Loco are volunteer, grass-roots organizations and are distinct from publicly-financed organizations such as the Azienda di Promozione Turistica (APT) or the Ufficio di Informazione e Accoglienza Turistica (IAT), the aim of which is to promote tourism.

Some Pro Loco have a legal identity as a non-profit organization if part of the Unione Nazionale Pro Loco d'Italia (UNPLI). Pro Loco with a statute in line with UNPLI's protocols could have legal advice and some fiscal advantages, mostly a reduced fare in paying the (quite expensive) rights to SIAE to play music or theatre in public places.

In most Italian towns, the Pro Loco's main purpose is to organize, finance, advertise, and operate the local Sagra or palio.

Pro Loco are generally focused on the service of residents rather than visitors. Some adopt a wider purpose, that of promoting the town's products or tourism. In some cases, a very active and socially conscious Pro Loco will sponsor publications, scholarly research, or the restoration of local monuments.
