= Marino DOC =

Italian controlled red wine origin in

Marino is a DOC wine that is produced on the western edge of the Alban Hills, south of Rome, and next to the town of Marino. The DOC was created in 1970. Marino wine is similar to the blend found in Frascati, and is primarily composed of Trebbiano and Malvasia (Bianca di Candia). The DOC allows for more range than typical Frascati. While Frascati is permitted to be made up entirely of the notoriously-bland Trebbiano, Marino caps Trebbiano at 25% to 55% of the blend. The rest of the blend is made up of 60% maximum Malvasia Bianca, 5% to 45% Malvasia del Lazio and up to 10% other wine grapes.
