= Sagra (festival) =

Italian festival

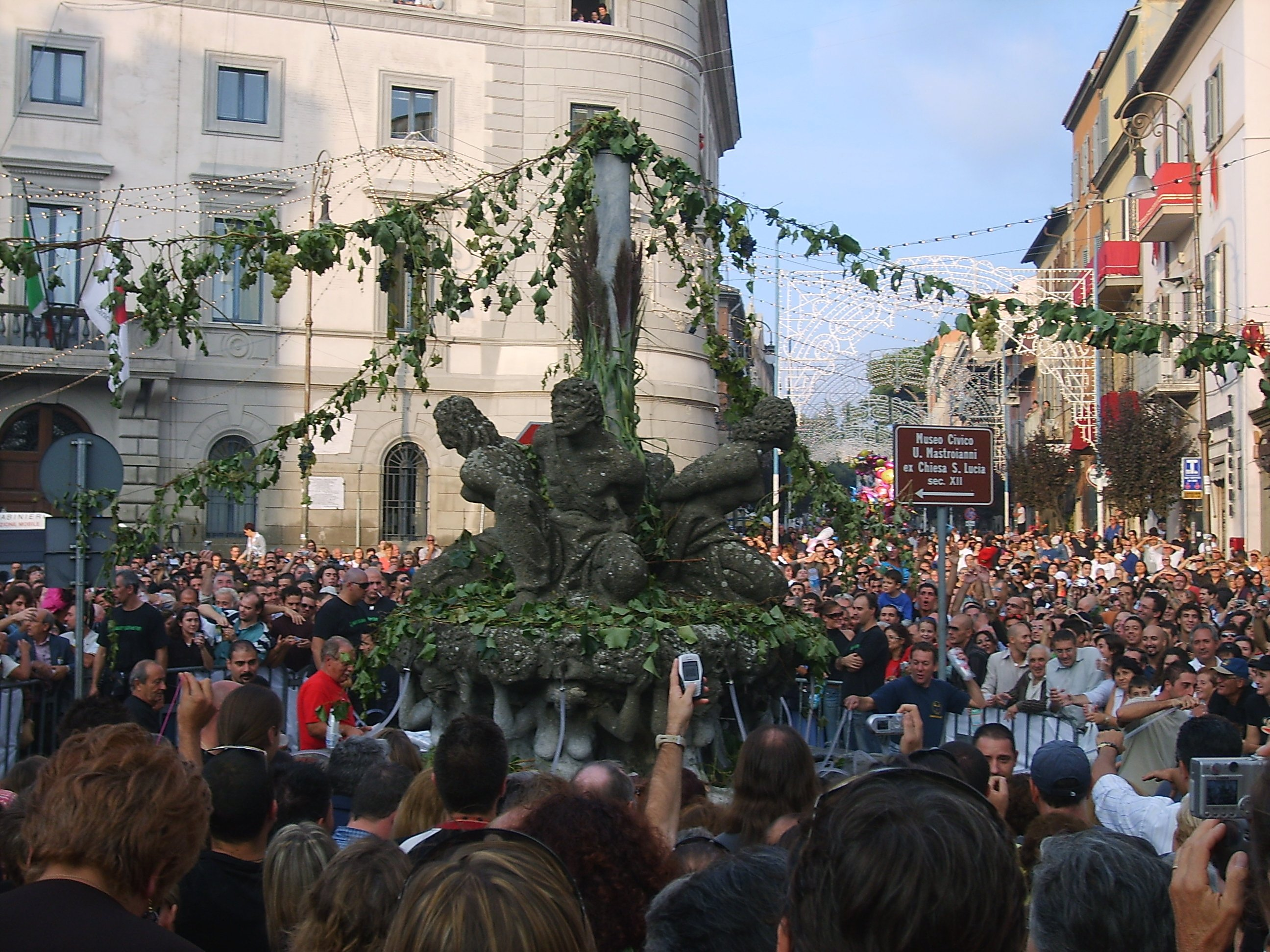
The 2006 Sagra dell'uva in Marino, Italy, celebrating grapes

In Italy, a sagra (pl.: sagre) is a local festival or feast celebrating an annual event such as the consecration of a church, the patron saint of a town, or a harvest. Such events always involve food and drink, and frequently a historical pageant and sporting events: when the sporting event is a historical recreation as well, such as a joust or a horse race in costume or armour, it is called "palio".

== Overview ==
The various sagre almost always have their origins in old country fairs or similar entertainments, but many of them now aim at visitors or even foreign tourists, and some, such as the Quintana of Foligno, had lapsed for many years but have been recently revived.

Sagra is often dedicated to some specifics of local food, and the name of the sagra includes that food; for example: Sagra della Rana at Casteldilago near Arrone, Sagra della Cipolla at Cannara, Sagra della Melanzana ripiena at Savona, Sagra della Polenta at Perticara di Novafeltria, Sagra del Lattarino at Bracciano, Sagra del Frico at Carpacco-Dignano, and so on. Among the most common sagre are those celebrating olive oil, wine, pasta and pastry of various types, chestnuts, and cheese.

== See also ==
- Patronal festival
- Sagra dell'uva
